= List of acts of the Parliament of the United Kingdom concerning museums =

The following is a list of acts of Parliament of the United Kingdom (and previously formally Great Britain during 1707–1800) concerning museums and galleries, in date order grouped by century:

== 18th century ==
- British Museum Act 1753 (26 Geo. 2. c. 22)
- British Museum Act 1767 (7 Geo. 3. c. 18)
- Sale by Lottery of Sir Ashton Lever's Museum Act 1784 (24 Geo. 3. Sess. 2. c. 22)

== 19th century ==
- British Museum Act 1805 (45 Geo. 3. c. 127)
- British Museum Act 1807 (47 Geo. 3 Sess. 2. c. 36)
- British Museum Act 1816 (56 Geo. 3. c. 99)
- British Museum Act 1824 (5 Geo. 4. c. 39)
- British Museum (No. 2) Act 1824 (5 Geo. 4. c. 60)
- British Museum Act 1832 (2 & 3 Will. 4. c. 46)
- Museums Act 1845
- National Gallery and Museums (Scotland) Act 1850
- National Gallery of Ireland Act 1854
- National Gallery of Ireland Act 1855
- National Museum of Industry for Scotland and General Register House Act 1855
- National Gallery Act 1856
- Industrial Museum (Scotland) Act 1860
- Sir J. Soane's Museum Act 1862
- Dublin National Gallery Act 1865
- National Gallery Enlargement Act 1866
- National Gallery Enlargement Act 1867
- London Museum Site Act 1868

Public Parks, Schools, and Museums Act 1871 (Note: Section 1.)
- Act of Parliament
- Parliament of the United Kingdom
- Long title: An Act to facilitate Gifts of Land for Public Parks, Schools, and Museums.
- Citation: 34 & 35 Vict. c. 13
- Territorial extent: England and Wales (Note: Section 2.)

Dates
- Royal assent: 25 May 1871
- Commencement: 25 May 1871 (Note: The Acts of Parliament (Commencement) Act 1793.)
- Repealed: 13 August 1888
Other legislation
Repealed by	Mortmain and Charitable Uses Act 1888

Status: Repealed

Text of statute as originally enacted

- Public Parks, Schools, and Museums Act 1871 (34 & 35 Vict. c. 13)
- National Gallery (Loan) Act 1883
- Dublin Science and Art Museum Act 1884
- National Portrait Gallery Act 1889

Museums and Gymnasiums Act 1891
- Act of Parliament
- Parliament of the United Kingdom
- Long title: An Act to enable Urban Authorities to provide and maintain Museums and Gymnasiums.
- Citation: 54 & 55 Vict. c. 22
- Territorial extent: England and Wales; Ireland; (Note: Section 2(2).)

Dates
- Royal assent: 3 July 1891
- Commencement: 3 July 1891 (Note: The Acts of Parliament (Commencement) Act 1793.)
- Repealed: England and Wales: 1 April 1965
Other legislation
Amended by	Public Libraries Act 1919; Local Government Act 1933
Repealed by	England and Wales: Physical Training and Recreation Act 1937 and Public Libraries and Museums Act 1964

Status: Partially repealed

Text of statute as originally enacted

- Museums and Gymnasiums Act 1891 (54 & 55 Vict. c. 22)
- British Museum (Purchase of Land) Act 1894 (57 & 58 Vict. c. 34)

== 20th century ==
- National Gallery (Purchase of Adjacent Land) Act 1901
- British Museum Act 1902 (2 Edw. 7. c. 12)
- National Galleries of Scotland Act 1906 (6 Edw. 7. c. 50)
- National Gallery and St. James's Park Act 1911

Public Libraries (Art Galleries in County Boroughs) (Ireland) Act 1911 (Note: Section 3(1).)
- Act of Parliament
- Parliament of the United Kingdom
- Long title: An Act to amend the Public Libraries (Ireland) Acts, 1855 to 1902, as respects the provision of Art Galleries in County Boroughs and for other purposes incidental thereto.
- Citation: 1 & 2 Geo. 5. c. 9
- Territorial extent: United Kingdom

Dates
- Royal assent: 18 August 1911
- Commencement: 18 August 1911
Other legislation
Amends	Public Libraries (Ireland) Act 1855

Status: Current legislation

Text of statute as originally enacted

- Public Libraries (Art Galleries in County Boroughs) (Ireland) Act 1911 (1 & 2 Geo. 5. c. 9)
- Royal Scottish Museum (Extension) Act 1912
- Copyright (British Museum) Act 1915 (5 & 6 Geo. 5. c. 38)
- Imperial War Museum Act 1920 (10 & 11 Geo. 5. c. 16)
- National Maritime Museum Act 1934
- National Gallery (Overseas Loans) Act 1935
- Wellington Museum Act 1947
- National Gallery and Tate Gallery Act 1954 (2 & 3 Eliz. 2. c. 65)
- National Museum of Antiquities of Scotland Act 1954
- Imperial War Museum Act 1955
- National Galleries of Scotland Act 1959
- British Museum Act 1963 (c. 24)
- Public Libraries and Museums Act 1964 (c. 75)
- Museum of London Act 1965 (c. 17)

Museums and Galleries Admission Charges Act 1972 (Note: Section 2.)
- Act of Parliament
- Parliament of the United Kingdom
- Long title: An Act to remove impediments to the making of charges for admission to the national museums and galleries in Great Britain.
- Citation: 1972 c. 73
- Territorial extent: United Kingdom

Dates
- Royal assent: 26 October 1972
- Commencement: 26 October 1972
Other legislation
Amended by	National Heritage (Scotland) Act 1985; Museums and Galleries Act 1992

Status: Amended

Text of statute as originally enacted

Revised text of statute as amended

Text of the Museums and Galleries Admission Charges Act 1972 as in force today (including any amendments) within the United Kingdom, from legislation.gov.uk.

- Museums and Galleries Admission Charges Act 1972 (c. 73)
- National Theatre and Museum of London Act 1973
- Museum of London Act 1986
- National Maritime Museum Act 1989
- Museums and Galleries Act 1992 (c. 44)

== 21st century ==
- none

== See also ==
- British Museum Act
