= British Museum Act 1807 =

Act of the Parliament of the United Kingdom

British Museum Act 1807 (Note: The citation of this act by this short title was authorised by section 5 of, and the second schedule to, the Statute Law Revision Act 1948. Due to the repeal of those provisions, it is now authorised by section 19(2) of the Interpretation Act 1978.)
- Act of Parliament
- Parliament of the United Kingdom
- Long title: An Act to enable the Trustees of the British Museum to exchange, sell or dispose of such parts of the Collections, and under such Restrictions, as are therein specified. (Note: These words are printed against this act in the second column of second schedule to the Statute Law Revision Act 1948, which is headed "Title".)
- Citation: 47 Geo. 3 Sess. 2. c. 36
- Territorial extent: United Kingdom

Dates
- Royal assent: 8 August 1807
- Commencement: 8 August 1807 (Note: The Acts of Parliament (Commencement) Act 1793.)
- Repealed: 30 September 1963 (Note: The British Museum Act 1963 (Commencement) Order 1963 (SI 1963/1546).)
Other legislation
Repealed by	British Museum Act 1963
Relates to	British Museum Act 1805

Status: Repealed

Text of statute as originally enacted

The British Museum Act 1807 (47 Geo. 3 Sess. 2. c. 36) was an act of the Parliament of the United Kingdom.

== Subsequent developments ==
The whole act was repealed by section 13(5) of, and the fourth schedule to, the British Museum Act 1963, which came into force on 30 September 1963.

== See also ==
- British Museum Act
