= British Museum Act 1816 =

Act of the Parliament of the United Kingdom

British Museum Act 1816 (Note: The citation of this act by this short title was authorised by section 5 of, and the second schedule to, the Statute Law Revision Act 1948. Due to the repeal of those provisions, it is now authorised by section 19(2) of the Interpretation Act 1978.)
- Act of Parliament
- Parliament of the United Kingdom
- Long title: An Act to vest the Elgin Collection of Ancient Marbles and Sculpture in the Trustees of the British Museum for the Use of the Public. (Note: These words are printed against this act in the second column of second schedule to the Statute Law Revision Act 1948, which is headed "Title".)
- Citation: 56 Geo. 3. c. 99
- Territorial extent: United Kingdom

Dates
- Royal assent: 1 July 1816
- Commencement: 1 July 1816 (Note: The Acts of Parliament (Commencement) Act 1793.)
- Repealed: 30 September 1963 (Note: The British Museum Act 1963 (Commencement) Order 1963 (SI 1963/1546).)
Other legislation
Repealed by	British Museum Act 1963

Status: Repealed

Text of statute as originally enacted

The British Museum Act 1816 or the Elgin Marbles Act (56 Geo. 3. c. 99) was an act of the Parliament of the United Kingdom.

The act authorised the Treasury to provide £35,000 to buy the Elgin Marbles for the British Museum, and enacted two other conditions imposed by Lord Elgin: that he and his successors would be appointed as trustees of the British Museum, and that the collection would be kept together and named 'The Elgin Collection'.

[...] Whereas the Right Honourable Thomas Earl of Elgin hath with great Knowledge, Judgment and Care, and at a great Expence, made a most valuable Collection of ancient Marbles and Sculpture, and is willing that the same should be possessed by the Public: And Whereas the said Earl hath agreed to sell the same for the Sum of Thirty five thousand Pounds, on Condition that the whole of the said Collection should be kept together in the British Museum, and open to inspection, and called by the Name of The Elgin Marbles [...]

[...] be it further enacted, That on Payment of the said Sum of Thirty five thousand Pounds, the said Collection shall be vested in the Trustees for the time being of the said British Museum, and their Successors, in perpetuity, for the Purposes of the said Act of the Twenty sixth Year of the Reign of His late Majesty King George the Second. (Note: British Museum Act 1755 (28 Geo. 2. c. 3))

And be it hereby further enacted, That the said Collection shall be preserved and kept together in the said British Museum whole and entire, and distinguished by the Name or Appellation of "The Elgin Collection."

== Subsequent developments ==
The whole act was repealed by section 13(5) of, and the fourth schedule to, the British Museum Act 1963, which came into force on 30 September 1963.

== See also ==
- British Museum Act
