= Turnpike trusts in the East Midlands =

Historic road maintenance bodies in England

This is a list of turnpike trusts that maintained roads in the East Midlands.

Between 1663 and 1836, the Parliament of Great Britain and the Parliament of the United Kingdom passed a series of acts of Parliament that created organisations – turnpike trusts – that collected road tolls, and used the money to repair the road. These applied to major roads, around a fifth of the road network. The turnpike system was phased out in the 1870s, and major roads transitioned in the 1880s to the maintenance of the new county councils.

The counties used for these lists are the historic counties of England that existed at the time of the turnpike trusts. This article lists those in the East Midlands: Derbyshire, Leicestershire, Lincolnshire, Northamptonshire, and Rutland.

== Derbyshire ==
Trust	Founded	Initial act	
Trust	Founded	Citation	Title
Alfreton and Derby Turnpike Trust	1802	42 Geo. 3. c. lxxxiii	Alfreton and Derby Roads Act 1802; An Act for widening, altering, improving and repairing the Road leading from Alfreton, in the County of Derby, to the Town of Derby.
Alfreton and Mansfield Turnpike Trust	1764	4 Geo. 3. c. 67	Derby and Nottinghamshire Roads Act 1764; An Act for repairing, widening, and keeping in Repair, the High Roads leading from Alfreton in the County of Derby, through Carter's Lane, to a certain Place in the Town of Mansfield called Stockwell; and from the Bridle Gate at the Division of the Liberties of Blackwell and Hucknall, through the Town of Sutton in Ashfield, to the Mansfield and Newark Turnpike at or near Python Hill in the Forest of Sherwood in the County of Nottingham.
Alfreton, Higham and Tibshelf Turnpike Trust	1786	26 Geo. 3. c. 151	Derby Roads Act 1786; An Act for making, repairing, and widening the Road from Heage in the County of Derby through Alfreton to Tibshelf in the same County, and also a Branch from the same Road at or near Shirland Lodge, to Higham in the same County.
Ashbourne and Yoxall Bridge Turnpike Trust	1766	6 Geo. 3. c. 79	Derby and Stafford Roads Act 1766; An Act for repairing and widening the Road from Ashborne to Sudbury, and from Sudbury to Yoxall Bridge, and from the Turnpike Road upon Hatton Moor to Tutbury, in the Counties of Derby and Stafford.
Ashbourne to Belper Bridge and Ripley Turnpike Trust	1764	4 Geo. 3. c. 82	Derby Roads Act 1764; An Act for widening and repairing the Road leading from Ashborne in the County of Derby, over Belpar Bridge, to the present Turnpike Road from Sheffield and Chesterfield to Derby, at or near a Place called Openwood Gate, and from Belpar Bridge to Ripley in the County of Derby.
Ashbourne, Sudbury and Brimington Turnpike Trust			
Ashford and Buxton Turnpike Trust	1810	50 Geo. 3. c. clxxi	Ashford and Buxton Turnpike Road (Derbyshire) Act 1810; An Act for making and maintaining a Turnpike Road from Ashford to or near to Buxton, in the County of Derby.
Birkin Lane Turnpike Trust	1766	6 Geo. 3. c. 87	Derby Roads (No. 3) Act 1766; An Act for repairing and widening the Road from the Mansfield and Chesterfield Turnpike Road near the Nine Mile Stone from Mansfield, through Temple Normanton, Tupton New Enclosure, and Birkin Lanc, to Bunting Field Nook, in the Parish of Ashover, in the County of Derby.
Brimington and Chesterfield Turnpike Trust	1766	6 Geo. 3. c. 80	Brimington and Chesterfield Roads Act 1766; An Act for repairing and widening the Roads from Brimmington and Chesterfield in the County of Derby, over the High Moors, to the several Places therein mentioned.
Chapel en le Frith and Enterclough Bridge Turnpike Trust	1792	32 Geo. 3. c. 128	Derby and Cheshire Roads Act 1792; An Act for repairing and improving the Road from the Town of Chapel-en-le-Frith, to or near to Enterclough Bridge, in the County of Derby; and also the Road from the Village of Hayfield to Marple Bridge, in the said County; and also the Road from the Village of Glossop, to a certain Gate called Claylands Gate, in the Township of Longdendale, on or near to the Side of the Turnpike Road leading from Mottram to Woodhead, in the County Palatine of Chester.
Chesterfield and Hernstone Lane Head Turnpike Trust	1758	32 Geo. 2. c. 43	Derbyshire Roads Act 1758; An Act for repairing and widening the Road from Chesterfield to the Turnpike Road at Hernstone Lane Head, and also the Road branching from the said Road upon The East Moor, through Baslow and Wardlow, to the Joining of the said Roads again near Wardlow Mires, and also the Road leading between the said Road and Branch from Calver Bridge to Baslow Bridge, and also the Road from the Turnpike Road near Newhaven House to the Turnpike Road near Grindleford Bridge in the County of Derby.
Chesterfield to Matlock, Darley and Rowsley Bridges Turnpike Trust	1759	33 Geo. 2. c. 39	Derbyshire Roads Act 1759; An Act for repairing and widening the Road from the Turnpike Road near the West End of the Town of Chesterfield to Matlock Bridge, and also the Road leading out of the said Road over Darley Bridge to Cross Green, and also the Road leading out of the last-mentioned Road to the Turnpike Road near Rowesly Bridge, in the County of Derby.
Chesterfield to Worksop Turnpike Trust	1738	12 Geo. 2. c. 12	Derbyshire Roads Act 1738; An Act for repairing the Roads from Bakewell to Chesterfield, in the County of Derby; and from Chesterfield to Worksopp, in the County of Nottingham; and from Chesterfield, to the Place where the Northern Road meets the Chesterfield Road which leads to Mansfield, in the said County of Nottingham.
Cromford and Belper Turnpike Trust	1817	57 Geo. 3. c. xiii	Road from Cromford to Belper Act 1817; An Act for making and maintaining a Turnpike Road from the Town of Cromford to the Town of Belper; and for making a Branch of Road from and out of the said Road near the River Amber, to join the Turnpike Road at Bull Bridge, all in the County of Derby.
Cromford and Newhaven Turnpike Trust	1804	44 Geo. 3. c. lxvii	Road from Cromford to Five Lane Ends, Hopton Moor Act 1804; An Act for amending, widening, altering, and improving, the road leading from the market-place in Cromford to the Five-Lane-Ends at the guide post on Hopton Moor, and for setting out and making two new roads branching from the said road, one up the valley, by Grange Mill, to Newhaven House, and the other from near the said valley to the town of Wirksworth, all in the county of Derby.
Cromford Bridge and Langley Mill Turnpike Trust	1766	6 Geo. 3. c. 69	Cromford Bridge to Langley Mill Road Act 1766; An Act for repairing, widening, and keeping in Repair, the Road leading from Cromford Bridge in the County of Derby, to the Turnpike Road at or near Langley Mill in the said County.
Derby and Burton on Trent Turnpike Trust	1753	26 Geo. 2. c. 59	Burton-upon-Trent and Derby Road Act 1753; An Act for repairing and widening the Road from the West End of the Town of Burton upon Trent, in the County of Stafford, through the said Town, to the South End of the Town of Derby, in the County of Derby.
Derby and Duffield Turnpike Trust	1756	29 Geo. 2. c. 82	Derby and Sheffield Roads Act 1756; An Act for repairing and widening the Road from the White Stoop near the North End of the Town of Derby, through the Towns of Duffield and Chesterfield in the County of Derby, to the Town of Sheffield in the County of York, and from the said Town of Duffield to The Moot Hall in the Town of Wirksworth in the said County of Derby.
Derby to Hurdloe House Turnpike Trust	1737	11 Geo. 2. c. 33	Derby Roads Act 1737; An Act for repairing the Roads from the Town of Loughborough, in the County of Leicester, to the Town of Derby, in the County of Derby; and from the said Town of Derby, to the Town of Brassington, in the said County of Derby; and from the said Town of Derby, through the Town of Ashborne, in the said County of Derby, to Hurdloe House, in the Parish of Hartingdon, in the said County.
Derby to Uttoxeter Turnpike Trust	1758	32 Geo. 2. c. 60	Derby to Newcastle-under-Lyne Road Act 1758; An Act for repairing and widening the Road from the Town of Derby to the Town of Newcastle under Lyne, in the County of Stafford.
Derby to Uttoxeter Turnpike Trust	1804	44 Geo. 3. c. lxiv	Road from Derby to Uttoxeter Act 1804; An Act for reviving the term, and continuing, altering, and enlarging the powers of two acts, passed in the thirty-second year of his late Majesty, and in the third year of his present Majesty, so far as the same relate to repairing and widening the road from the town of Derby to the town of Uttoxeter, in the county of Stafford.
Derby, Mansfield and Nutthall Turnpike Trust	1764	4 Geo. 3. c. 61	Nottinghamshire Roads Act 1764; An Act for repairing and widening the Road from Derby to Mansfield, in the County of Nottingham, and several other Roads therein mentioned.
Duffield and Heage Turnpike Trust	1793	33 Geo. 3. c. 177	Heage to Duffield Road Act 1793; An Act for repairing, widening, altering, and improving the Road from Heage, in the County of Derby, through Belper, to Duffield, in the said County.
Duffield and Sheffield Turnpike Trust	1756	29 Geo. 2. c. 82	Derby and Sheffield Roads Act 1756; An Act for repairing and widening the Road from the White Stoop near the North End of the Town of Derby, through the Towns of Duffield and Chesterfield in the County of Derby, to the Town of Sheffield in the County of York, and from the said Town of Duffield to The Moot Hall in the Town of Wirksworth in the said County of Derby.
Duffield and Wirksworth Turnpike Trust	1756	29 Geo. 2. c. 82	Derby and Sheffield Roads Act 1756; An Act for repairing and widening the Road from the White Stoop near the North End of the Town of Derby, through the Towns of Duffield and Chesterfield in the County of Derby, to the Town of Sheffield in the County of York, and from the said Town of Duffield to The Moot Hall in the Town of Wirksworth in the said County of Derby.
Glossop and Marple Bridge Turnpike Trust	1803	43 Geo. 3. c. xviii	Road from Glossop Act 1803; An Act for amending, widening, repairing, and improving the Road from or near to the Village of Glossop, in the County of Derby, to or near to Marple Bridge, in the said County; and for making several Branches of Roads to and from the same.
Glossop and Marple Bridge Turnpike Trust	1824	5 Geo. 4. c. xxxv	Road from Glossop to Marple Bridge Act 1824; An Act for amending and improving the Road from Glossop to Marple Bridge in the County of Derby, and the several Branches of Roads leading to and from the same.
Glossop and Marple Bridge Turnpike Trust	1860	5 Geo. 4. c. xxxv	Glossop and Marple Bridge Turnpike Roads Act 1860; An Act to repeal the Act for amending and improving the Road from Glossop to Marple Bridge in the County of Derby, and the several Branches of Roads leading to and from the same, and to make other Provisions in lieu thereof.
Haddon and Bentley Turnpike Trust; Bakewell to Bentley Turnpike Trust	1811	51 Geo. 3. c. lxxiv	Haddon and Bentley (Derbyshire) Road Act 1811; An Act for making and maintaining a Road from the Guide Post below Haddon, out of the Bakewell Turnpike Road, by Grange Mill, into the Bentley and Ashbourne Turnpike Road, in the County of Derby.
Ideridgehay and Duffield Turnpike Trust	1808	48 Geo. 3. c. xxxi	Road from Wirksworth to Duffield Act 1808; An Act for making and maintaining a Road from the Wirksworth Turnpike Road, in the Hamlet of Ideridgehay, to the Town of Duffield, in the County of Derby.
London Turnpike Road Turnpike Trust	1737	11 Geo. 2. c. 33	Derby Roads Act 1737; An Act for repairing the Roads from the Town of Loughborough, in the County of Leicester, to the Town of Derby, in the County of Derby; and from the said Town of Derby, to the Town of Brassington, in the said County of Derby; and from the said Town of Derby, through the Town of Ashborne, in the said County of Derby, to Hurdloe House, in the Parish of Hartingdon, in the said County.
Macclesfield to Chapel en le Frith Turnpike Trust	1770	10 Geo. 3. c. 98	Chester and Derby Roads Act 1770; An Act for repairing, widening, and altering, the Road from Macclesfield, in the County of Chester, to the Turnpike Road at Randle Carr Lane Head in Femille, in the County of Derby, leading to Chapel in the Frith, in the same County.
Mansfield and Chesterfield Turnpike Trust	1758	32 Geo. 2. c. 37	Mansfield and Chesterfield Road Act 1758; An Act for repairing and widening the High Road leading from the Town of Mansfield in the County of Nottingham, through the Towns of Pleasley, Glapwell, Heath, and Normenton, and the Liberty of Hasland, to the Turnpike Road leading from the Town of Derby to the Town of Chesterfield in the County of Derby.
Nottingham Turnpike Trust	1758	32 Geo. 2. c. 38	Notts and Derby Roads Act 1758; An Act for repairing and widening the Roads from Chappel Bar near the West End of the Town of Nottingham, to Newhaven, and from the Four Lane Ends near Oakerthorpe to Ashborne, and from the Cross Post on Wirksworth Moor, to join the Road leading from Chesterfield to Chappel-en-le-Frith, at or near Longston in the County of Derby, and from Selston to Annesley Woodhouse in the County of Nottingham.
Okerthorpe and Ashbourne Turnpike Trust	1758	32 Geo. 2. c. 38	Notts and Derby Roads Act 1758; An Act for repairing and widening the Roads from Chappel Bar near the West End of the Town of Nottingham, to Newhaven, and from the Four Lane Ends near Oakerthorpe to Ashborne, and from the Cross Post on Wirksworth Moor, to join the Road leading from Chesterfield to Chappel-en-le-Frith, at or near Longston in the County of Derby, and from Selston to Annesley Woodhouse in the County of Nottingham.
Onecote Buxton Road Turnpike Trust	1770	10 Geo. 3. c. 113	Stafford Roads Act 1770; An Act for repairing, widening, turning, and altering the Roads from Butterton Moor End, near Oncott, in the County of Stafford, to the Three Mile Stone in the Turnpike Road leading from Buxton to Ashborne, in the County of Derby; and from Blackton Moor, in the County of Stafford, to the Turnpike Road leading from Buxton to Ashbourne, near Newhaven, in the County of Derby; and from Warslow to Ecton Mine, in the County of Stafford.
Owler Bar Turnpike Trust; Norton to Hathersage Turnpike Trust	1781	21 Geo. 3. c. 83	Derbyshire Roads (No. 2) Act 1781; An Act for repairing, widening, and altering the Road, from the present Turnpike Road upon Greenhill Moor, near Norton, in the County of Derby, to Hathersage, in the same County, through the several Parishes of Norton, Dronfield, and Hathersage, in the said County of Derby; and also the Road from the Road leading from Chesterfield to Hernstone Lane Head, near Stoney Middleton, to Totley, through the several Parishes of Bakewell, Hope, Hathersage, and Dronfield, all in the said County of Derby.
Sheffield and Chapel en le Frith Turnpike Trust; Banner Cross to Fox House Turnpike Trust	1757	31 Geo. 2. c. 62	Yorks and Derby Roads Act 1757; An Act for repairing and widening the Roads from Little Sheffield in the County of York, through the Towns of Hathersage, Hope, and Castleton, to Sparrowpit Gate in the County of Derby, and from the Guide Post near Barber's Fields Cupola, through Grindleford Bridge, Great Hucklow, Tidswell, Hardgate Wall, and Fairfield, to Buxton in the County of Derby.
Sheffield and Gander Lane Turnpike Trust	1779	19 Geo. 3. c. 99	Derby and Yorks Roads Act 1779; An Act for repairing and widening the Road from Gander Lane, in the County of Derby, to Sheffield, in the West Riding of the County of York; and also the Road branching out of the said Road at or near Mosbrough Green, in the said County of Derby, to Clown, in the same County.
Sheffield and Glossop Turnpike Trust	1818	58 Geo. 3. c. xxxv	Sheffield and Glossop Road Act 1818; An Act for making and maintaining a Road from the Town of Sheffield, in the County of York, to join the Marple Bridge Road in the Parish of Glossop, in the County of Derby, with a Branch to Mortimer's Road, in the Parish of Hathersage, in the said County of Derby.
Sheffield and Glossop Turnpike Trust	1818	6 Geo. 4. c. xcviii	Sheffield and Glossop Road Act 1825; An Act for more effectually repairing and improving the Road from Sheffield, in the County of York, to the Marple Bridge Road, in the Parish of Glossop, in the County of Derby, and the Branch to Mortimer's Road, in the Parish of Hathersage, in the said County of Derby.
Sheffield and Glossop Turnpike Trust	1818	14 & 15 Vict. c. cxxxiii	Sheffield and Glossop Turnpike Road Act 1851; An Act for repairing the Road from Sheffield in the County of York to the Marple Bridge Road in the Parish of Glossop in the County of Derby, and the Branch to Mortimer's Road in the Parish of Hathersage in the said County of Derby.
Temple Normanton and Tibshelf Turnpike Trust; Chesterfield to Tibshelf Side Turnpike Trust	1827	7 & 8 Geo. 4. c. iv	Temple Normanton and Tibshelf Turnpike Road (Derbyshire) Act 1827; An Act for making and maintaining a Turnpike Road from Temple Normanton, in the Parish of Chesterfield, to the Mansfield and Tibshelf Turnpike Road, at or near Tibshelf Side Gate, in the County of Derby.
Tideswell, Blackwell, Edensor and Ashford Turnpike Trust	1812	52 Geo. 3. c. cxxi	Tideswell and Slough Lane, and Edensor and Ashford Turnpike Roads Act 1812; An Act for making and maintaining a Turnpike Road from Tideswell to Blackwell, and thence to Sough Lane; and also from Edensor to Ashford, all in the County of Derby.
Tupton and Ashover Turnpike Trust	1808	48 Geo. 3. c. xxxviii	Road from the Mansfield and Chesterfield Turnpike Road and from Tupton Nether Green Act 1808; An Act to continue the Term, and alter the Powers, of Two Acts, for repairing the Road from the Mansfield and Chesterfield Turnpike Road, to Buntingfield Nook, in the County of Derby; and for making a new Road from Tupton Nether Green to Stubbing Edge Lane and Knot Cross, in the said County.
Wirksworth and Derby Turnpike Trust	1793	33 Geo. 3. c. 152	Derby Roads Act 1793; An Act for repairing and widening the Road from the Moot Hall, in Wirksworth to the Turnpike Road leading from Derby to Brassington, at or near to a Place called the Cross in the Hand, on Hulland Ward, and also the Road from the Moot Hall to another Turnpike Road leading from the Cross-Post on Wirksworth Moor to Matlock Bath, at or near to a Place called the Steeple House, in the Township of Wirksworth aforesaid, all in the County of Derby.

== Leicestershire ==
Trust	Founded	Initial act	
Trust	Founded	Citation	Title
Appleby Turnpike Trust	1759	33 Geo. 2. c. 47	Derby, Leicester and Warwick Roads Act 1759; An Act for amending, widening, and keeping in Repair, several Roads therein mentioned, lying in the Counties of Derby, Leicester, and Warwick.
Ashby de la Zouch Turnpike Trust	1753	26 Geo. 2. c. 46	Leicester Roads Act 1753; An Act for repairing the Road from the Borough of Leicester, in the County of Leicester, to the Town of Ashby de la Zouch, in the said County.
Bridgeford Lane and Kettering Turnpike Trust	1754	27 Geo. 2. c. 39	Bridgeford Lane, Nottinghamshire to Kettering Road Act 1754; An Act for repairing and widening the Road from the North End of Bridgeford Lane, in the County of Nottingham, to and through several Towns and Places, in the Counties of Nottingham, Leicester, Rutland, and through Rockingham to the Bowling Green at Kettering in the County of Northampton.
Burton on Trent to Market Bosworth Turnpike Trust; Burton Bridge to Market Bosworth Turnpike Trust	1759	33 Geo. 2. c. 47	Derby, Leicester and Warwick Roads Act 1759; An Act for amending, widening, and keeping in Repair, several Roads therein mentioned, lying in the Counties of Derby, Leicester, and Warwick.
Desford Turnpike Trust	1788	28 Geo. 3. c. 100	Leicester Roads Act 1788; An Act for repairing and widening the Road from the Leicester and Welford Turnpike Road in the Counties of Leicester and Northampton, near Foston Lane, to the Turnpike Road leading from Hinckley to Ashby-de-la-Zouch in the said County of Leicester.
Hinckley and Lutterworth Turnpike Trust	1762	2 Geo. 3. c. 54	Leicestershire Roads Act 1762; An Act for amending, widening, and keeping in Repair, the Road from Castle Street at the End of the Town of Hinckley, to Lutterworth Town's End; and from or near the Guide Post at Walcot Town's End in the County of Leicester, to the Eighty Mile Stone in Welford Field in the County of Northampton.
Hinckley and Melbourne Turnpike Trust	1759	33 Geo. 2. c. 46	Leicester and Derby Roads Act 1759; An Act for repairing and widening the High Roads from Hinckley to Woeful Bridge, and also from Hoo-Ash-Lane through Old Lane, and from Swannington to Lee Gutter, and from thence to Melbourn Common, and from Ibstock to Measham, in the Counties of Leicester and Derby.
Hinckley and Narborough Turnpike Trust	1754	27 Geo. 2. c. 42	Leicester and Warwick Roads Act 1754; An Act for repairing and widening the Road from Leicester to Narborough, and from Leicester to Coventry, and from thence through Kenilworth to Warwick, and from thence to Halford Bridge, and from Warwick to Stratford upon Avon, and from Coventry to Martyn's Gutter, leading towards Stoneleigh Town; and for supplying an Omission in an Act passed in the last Session of Parliament, for repairing the Road from Leicester to Ashby de la Zouch, in the County of Leicester.
Leicester and Lutterworth Turnpike Trust	1764	4 Geo. 3. c. 84	Leicester Roads Act 1764; An Act for repairing and widening the Roads from Melton Mowbray in the County of Leicester, to the Guide Post in Saint Margaret's Field, Leicester; and from the Town of Leicester to the Town of Lutterworth in the said County, and other Roads therein mentioned.
Leicester and Welford Turnpike Trust	1765	5 Geo. 3. c. 78	Welford and Leicester Road Act 1765; An Act for repairing, widening, and keeping in Repair, the Road from Welford Bridge in the County of Northampton, through Husband’s Bosworth and Great Wigston, to Milston Lane in the Town of Leicester.
Leicester to Coventry Turnpike Trust	1831		See Coventry to Stoney Stanton Turnpike Trust under Warwickshire in Turnpike trusts in the West Midlands
Leicester to Peterborough Turnpike Trust; Uppingham Turnpike Trust	1754	27 Geo. 2. c. 30	Leicester to Peterborough Road Act 1754; An Act for repairing and widening the Road from the Borough of Leicester, to and by the North Side of the Town of Uppingham, in the County of Rutland, and to Wansford in the County of Northampton, and from thence to Peterborough in the said County of Northampton.
Loughborough and Ashby de la Zouch etc. Turnpike Trust; Loughborough and Ashby-de-la-Zouch Turnpike Trust	1757	30 Geo. 2. c. 44	Leicester Roads Act 1757; An Act for amending, widening, and keeping in Repair, the Road leading from Burleigh Bridge in the Town of Loughborough, to Ashby de la Zouch in the County of Leicester.
Loughborough to Cavendish Bridge Turnpike Trust	1737	11 Geo. 2. c. 33	Derby Roads Act 1737; An Act for repairing the Roads from the Town of Loughborough, in the County of Leicester, to the Town of Derby, in the County of Derby; and from the said Town of Derby, to the Town of Brassington, in the said County of Derby; and from the said Town of Derby, through the Town of Ashborne, in the said County of Derby, to Hurdloe House, in the Parish of Hartingdon, in the said County.
Market Harborough and Coventry Turnpike Trust	1755	28 Geo. 2. c. 40	Market Harborough to Coventry Road Act 1755; An Act for repairing and widening the Road from the Town of Market-Harborough in the County of Leicester, through the Town of Lutterworth in the said County, to the City of Coventry.
Market Harborough and Loughborough Turnpike Trust	1725	12 Geo. 1. c. 5	Leicestershire Road Act 1725; An Act for repairing the Road from Market Harborough to Loughborough, in the County of Leicester.
Markfield and Whitwick Turnpike Trust; Whitwick Turnpike Trust	1757	30 Geo. 2. c. 49	Leicestershire Roads Act 1757; An Act for repairing and widening the Road from Markfield Turnpike in the County of Leicester, over Charley otherwise Charnwood Forest, through the Town of Whitwick; and from thence, through Talbot Lane, to where the Road leading from the Town of Loughborough to the Town of Ashby de la Zouch in the said County comes in from Ryley Lane, near to a Place called Snape Gate.
Melton Mowbray Turnpike Trust	1764	4 Geo. 3. c. 84	Leicester Roads Act 1764; An Act for repairing and widening the Roads from Melton Mowbray in the County of Leicester, to the Guide Post in Saint Margaret's Field, Leicester; and from the Town of Leicester to the Town of Lutterworth in the said County, and other Roads therein mentioned.
Melton Mowbray and Grantham Turnpike Trust	1780	20 Geo. 3. c. 95	Melton Mowbray to Grantham Road Act 1780; An Act for making and maintaining a Road from Sage Cross, in the Town of Melton Mowbray, in the County of Leicester, to the Town of Grantham, in the County of Lincoln.
Moira and Hartshorne Turnpike Trust; Moira and Gresley Turnpike Trust	1794	34 Geo. 3. c. 120	Roads from Ticknall Act 1794; An act for amending and repairing the roads from a place called Scaddow Gate, in the parish of Ticknall, to the Burton upon Trent and Ashby de la Zouch turnpike road, at or near a place called The Wooden Box, and certain other roads therein mentioned, in the counties of Derby and Leicester.
Pinwall Lane Turnpike Trust	1759	33 Geo. 2. c. 47	Derby, Leicester and Warwick Roads Act 1759; An Act for amending, widening, and keeping in Repair, several Roads therein mentioned, lying in the Counties of Derby, Leicester, and Warwick.
Sapcote and Narborough Turnpike Trust	1814	54 Geo. 3. c. xxiv	Road from Burbage to Narborough Act 1814; An Act for amending and widening the Road, commencing at or near the Side Gate on the Hinckley and Lutterworth Turnpike Road, in the Parish of Burbage, in the County of Leicester, to the Leicester Turnpike Road, in or near to the Village of Narborough, in the said County.
Tamworth to Harrington Bridge Turnpike Trust	1759	33 Geo. 2. c. 41	Leicester Roads Act 1759; An Act for amending, widening, and keeping in Repair, the High Road from the Borough of Tamworth to Ashby de la Zouch in the County of Leicester, and from Sawley Ferry in the said County, to a Turnpike Gate at or near the End of Swareliff Lane leading to Ashby de la Zouch aforesaid.
Wanlip Turnpike Trust	1771	11 Geo. 3. c. 88	Leicester Roads Act 1771; An Act to continue and render more effectual Two Acts, passed in the Twelfth Year of the Reign of King George the First, and the Nineteenth Year of the Reign of His late Majesty, for repairing the Road from Market Harborough to Loughborough, in the County of Leicester; and for repairing, widening, turning, and altering, the Road branching out of the aforesaid Road at a Place called Filling Gate, to a Road called The Foss Road, and from thence to the Turnpike Road leading from Melton Mowbray to the Guide Post in Saint Margaret's Field, Leicester.

== Lincolnshire ==
Trust	Founded	Initial act	
Trust	Founded	Citation	Title
Bourn Turnpike Trust	1756	29 Geo. 2. c. 76	Northamptonshire and Lincoln Roads Act 1756; An Act for enlarging and altering the Term and Powers granted by an Act made in the Twenty-second Year of His present Majesty's Reign, for effectually amending and repairing the Road leading from Wandsford Bridge in the County of Northampton, to the Town and Borough of Stamford in the County of Lincoln; and for repairing the Road from the Borough of Stamford to Stapleford Bridge in the Parish of Ryehall in the County of Rutland, and from thence to Bourne in the County of Lincoln.
Bracebridge to Lincoln Turnpike Trust	1756	29 Geo. 2. c. 84	Lincoln Roads Act 1756; An Act for repairing and widening the Roads from the North End of Dunsby Lane to the South West Corner of Riseholm Hedge, and to Carholm Gate, Drinsey Nooke, and Dunham and Littleburgh Ferries, and from the North End of Waddington Field, and the Bridge over the River Witham at Bracebridge, to the City of Lincoln, and from the Gate at the Foot of Canwicke Hill to the Great Bar Gates of the said City; and for enforcing the Performance of Statute Work upon the Highways communicating with the said Roads, to a certain Distance from the said Roads.
Bridge-End Turnpike Trust; Grantham to Swaton Turnpike Trust	1804	44 Geo. 3. c. l	Grantham Road Act 1804; An Act for repairing, improving, maintaining, and widening, the road branching out of the great north road by the guide-post at the south end of Spittlegate, in the parish of Grantham, in the county of Lincoln, and leading from thence to the turnpike-road, or near Bridge End, in the same county.
Deeping and Morcott Turnpike Trust	1762	2 Geo. 3. c. 73	Lincoln and Rutland Roads Act 1762; An Act for repairing and widening the Roads from a certain Bridge called James Deeping Stone Bridge, to Peter's Gate in Stamford in the County of Lincoln, and from thence to the South End of the Town of Morcot in the County of Rutland.
Dexthorpe Turnpike Trust	1765	5 Geo. 3. c. 85	Notts and Lincoln Roads Act 1765; An Act for repairing and widening the Roads from Bawtry Bridge in the County of Nottingham, to Hainton in the County of Lincoln; and from North Willingham to the North End of the Lane between Dexthorpe and Langton; and from West Rassin to Pilford Bridge; and from the Great Road near Bishop Bridge to Bishop Norton Common; and from the Hamlet of Morton to Epworth; and from Haxey Field to The Trent, at Kinnald Ferry in the said County of Lincoln.
Donington Turnpike Trust	1757	31 Geo. 2. c. 50	Lincoln Roads Act 1757; An Act for repairing and widening the Roads from Donington High Bridge to Hale Drove, and to the Eighth Mile Stone in the Parish of Wigtoft, and to Langret Ferry, in the County of Lincoln.
Donington to Hacconbury Field Turnpike Trust	1756	29 Geo. 2. c. 85	Lincoln and Peterborough Roads Act 1756; An Act for repairing and widening the Roads leading from the East Side of Lincoln Heath to the City of Peterborough, and from the East End of Marham Lane to the Town of Walton, in the County of Northampton, and from the Town of Bourne to the Town of Colsterworth, and from Donington High Bridge to the Cross Post in the Parish of Hacconby, and from the East End of a Lane called Hale Drove, to and through the Town of Old Sleaford, to the End of Long Hedge in the Parish of Quarrington in the County of Lincoln.
Foston Turnpike Trust	1725	12 Geo. 1. c. 16	Foston Bridge and Witham Common Road Act 1725; An Act for repairing the Road from Spittlegate Hill, near Grantham, in the County of Lincoln, to Little Drayton, in the County of Nottingham.
Grantham and Nottingham Turnpike Trust	1758	32 Geo. 2. c. 53	Lincoln and Nottingham Roads Act 1758; An Act for repairing and widening the Roads from Grantham in the County of Lincoln, through Bottesford and Bingham, to Nottingham Trent Bridge, and from Chappel Bar near to the West End of the Town of Nottingham to Saint Mary's Bridge in the Town of Derby, and from the Guide Post in the Parish of Lenton to Sawley Ferrey.
Grantham to Foston Bridge Turnpike Trust	1767	7 Geo. 3. c. 78	Lincoln and Notts Roads Act 1766; An Act for continuing and enlarging the Term and Powers of so much of Two Acts, made in the Twelfth Year of the Reign of King George the First, and in the Twelfth Year of the Reign of King George the Second, for repairing the Road from Spittlegate Hill near Grantham in the County of Lincoln, to Little Drayton in the County of Nottingham, as relates to the Road leading from Foston Bridge in the County of Lincoln, to Little Drayton in the County of Nottingham.
Great Grimsby Haven to Irby Turnpike Trust	1765	5 Geo. 3. c. 73	Lincoln Roads Act 1765; An Act for repairing and widening the Road from Great Grimsby Haven, at or near a Place called The Upper Sand End, to Wold Newton Church, and from Nun's Farm to the Mill Field in the Parish of Irby, in the County of Lincoln.
Holbeach Turnpike Trust	1764	4 Geo. 3. c. 53	Lincoln Roads Act 1764; An Act for repairing and widening the Roads from the High Bridge in Spalding to a certain Place called Tydd Goat in the County of Lincoln, and from, Sutton Saint Mary's to Sutton Wash in the said County.
Leadenham and Southwell Turnpike Trust	1758	32 Geo. 2. c. 57	Lincoln and Notts Roads Act 1758; An Act for repairing and widening the Roads from a Place called Littlegate at the Top of Leadenham Hill in the County of Lincoln, to the West End of Barnby Gate in Newark upon Trent, and from the Guide Post at the Division of Kelham and Muskham Lanes to Mansfield, and from Southwell to Oxton in the County of Nottingham.
Lincoln Turnpike Trust	1756	29 Geo. 2. c. 84	Lincoln Roads Act 1756; An Act for repairing and widening the Roads from the North End of Dunsby Lane to the South West Corner of Riseholm Hedge, and to Carholm Gate, Drinsey Nooke, and Dunham and Littleburgh Ferries, and from the North End of Waddington Field, and the Bridge over the River Witham at Bracebridge, to the City of Lincoln, and from the Gate at the Foot of Canwicke Hill to the Great Bar Gates of the said City; and for enforcing the Performance of Statute Work upon the Highways communicating with the said Roads, to a certain Distance from the said Roads.
Lincoln Heath to Peterborough Turnpike Trust	1756	29 Geo. 2. c. 85	Lincoln and Peterborough Roads Act 1756; An Act for repairing and widening the Roads leading from the East Side of Lincoln Heath to the City of Peterborough, and from the East End of Marham Lane to the Town of Walton, in the County of Northampton, and from the Town of Bourne to the Town of Colsterworth, and from Donington High Bridge to the Cross Post in the Parish of Hacconby, and from the East End of a Lane called Hale Drove, to and through the Town of Old Sleaford, to the End of Long Hedge in the Parish of Quarrington in the County of Lincoln.
Lincoln, Brigg, Barton and Caistor Turnpike Trust	1765	5 Geo. 3. c. 88	Lincoln Roads (No. 2) Act 1765; An Act for repairing and widening the Road from Barton Watersidehouse to Riseham Hedge Corner, and several other Roads, in the County of Lincoln, therein mentioned.
Littleworth Turnpike Trust	1757	30 Geo. 2. c. 68	Lincoln and Northampton Roads Act 1757; An Act for repairing and widening the Roads leading from Spalding High Bridge, through Littleworth, and by Frognall, and over James Deeping Stone Bridge, in the County of Lincoln, to Maxey Outgang in the County of Northampton, adjoining to the High Road there.
Louth Turnpike Trust; Saltfleet to Louth Turnpike Trust	1770	10 Geo. 3. c. 109	Louth Roads Act 1770; An Act for repairing and widening several Roads leading from the Town of Louth, in the County of Lincoln.
Scartho Turnpike Trust	1803	43 Geo. 3. c. cxxxiii	Scartho and Louth Road Act 1803; An Act for repairing, altering, and widening the Road from a Lane called Back Lane, in the Parish of Scartho, to Hollowgate Head, in the Parish of Louth, in the County of Lincoln.
Sleaford and Tattershall Turnpike Trust	1793	33 Geo. 3. c. 150	Lincoln Roads Act 1793; An Act for widening, turning, altering, repairing, and maintaining the Road leading from the East Side of the Market Place in New Sleaford, to and through the Town of Anwick, in the County of Lincoln, and for making public the Drove Road from the said Town of Anwick to Kyme Praie Grounds, and for making a Road from thence to join the present Road near North Kyme Town; and for widening, turning, altering, repairing, and maintaining the Road leading from thence, through the said Town of North Kyme, near Billinghay Dales, to the River Witham, and also the Road from the opposite Shore of the said River to the Town of Tattershall, in the said County of Lincoln; and for building a Bridge over the Witham, at or near to Tattershall Ferry.
Spalding and Cowbit Bank Turnpike Trust	1772	12 Geo. 3. c. 103	River Welland Act 1772; An Act for the better Preservation of the Great Bank of the River Welland from Spalding High Bridge, through Cowbit, Peakill, Crowland, and Peakirk, and for making and keeping in Repair, a Road thereon, and from thence to the Village of Glenton, in the Counties of Lincoln and Northampton.
Spalding and Donington Turnpike Trust	1764	4 Geo. 3. c. 80	Lincoln Road Act 1764; An Act for repairing and widening the Roads from Spalding High Bridge to the Market Place in Donington, and from the Tenth Mile Stone in the Parish of Gosbertown to the Eighth Mile Stone in the Parish of Wigtoft, in the County of Lincoln.
Spilsby Turnpike Trust; Alford to Boston Turnpike Trust	1765	5 Geo. 3. c. 96	Alford to Cowbridge Road Act 1765; An Act for repairing and widening the Road from Alford to Boston, and from thence to Cowbridge, in the County of Lincoln.
Stamford to Grantham Turnpike Trust	1738	12 Geo. 2. c. 8	Stamford and Grantham Road Act 1738; An Act for repairing the Road between Stamford and Grantham, in the County of Lincoln.
Swineshead and Fosdyke Turnpike Trust	1826	7 Geo. 4. c. lxxxiii	Swineshead and Fosdyke Turnpike Road (Lincolnshire) Act 1826; An Act for making into a Turnpike Road a Road leading from the Cross Gate in the Parish of Swineshead, to the Southern Extremity of the Parish of Fosdyke in the County of Lincoln, and repairing and maintaining the same.
Wragby Turnpike Trust	1738	12 Geo. 2. c. 10	Lincoln (City) Roads Act 1738; An Act for repairing the Roads from the North West Parts of the County of Lincoln, through Nettlam Fields, Wraghy Lane, and Baumber Fields, to The Wolds, or North East Part of the said County.

== Northamptonshire ==
Trust	Founded	Initial act		Route	
Trust	Founded	Citation	Title	From	To
Banbury to Drayton Turnpike Trust	1765	5 Geo. 3. c. 105	Banbury to Lutterworth Road Act 1765; An Act for repairing and widening the Road from the Turnpike Road in Banbury, in the County of Oxford, through Daventry and Cottesbach, to the South End of Mill Field, in the Parish of Lutterworth, in the County of Leicester.	Banbury	Lutterworth
Buckingham and Hanwell – Weeping Cross Turnpike Trust; Buckingham and Hanwell Turnpike Trust (Lower Division)	1743	17 Geo. 2. c. 43	Buckingham to Warmington Road Act 1743; An Act for repairing the Road from the Town of Buckingham, in the County of Bucks, to Warmington, in the County of Warwick.	Aynho	Hanwell
Buckingham, Brackley, Banbury Turnpike Trust	1791	31 Geo. 3. c. 133	Buckingham to Banbury Road Act 1791; An Act for amending and widening several Pieces of Road, and opening and making several Pieces of new Road therein described, so as to make a convenient Carriage Road from Buckingham through Brackley, to join the Daventry Turnpike Road near Banbury.	Buckingham	Banbury
Crowland and Eye Turnpike Trust	1817	57 Geo. 3. c. liv	Road from Crowland to Eye Act 1817; An Act for making and maintaining a Turnpike Road from the Town of Crowland, in the County of Lincoln, to the Town of Eye, in the County of Northampton.	Crowland	Eye
Dunchurch Turnpike Trust; Northampton to Dunchurch Turnpike Trust	1738	12 Geo. 2. c. 18	Warwick Roads Act 1738; An Act for repairing the Road, or Highway, from The Dun Cow, in the Town of Dunchurch, through the Parish of Bilton, over Dunsmore Heath, to the Town of Hill Morton, in the County of Warwick; and from thence, through the several Parishes of Creek, West Haddon, and East Haddon, in the County of Northampton, to Saint James's End, in the Parish of Duston, in the said County of Northampton.	Dunchurch	St James' End
Hardingstone to Old Stratford Turnpike Trust	1768	8 Geo. 3. c. 52	Hardingston and Old Stratford Road Act 1768; An Act for repairing and widening the road from the Way Post in the Parish of Hardingston, in the County of Northampton, to Old Stratford, in the same County.	Northampton	Stony Stratford
Higham Ferrers Turnpike Trust	1754	27 Geo. 2. c. 33	Bedford and Northamptonshire Roads Act 1754; An Act for repairing and widening the High Road from Westwood Gate, in the Parish of Knotting, in the County of Bedford, through the Towns of Rushden and Higham Ferrers, and over Artleborough Bridge to the Turnpike Road in Barton Seagrave Lane, in the Parish of Barton Seagrave, in the County of Northampton.	Knotting	Barton Seagrave
Kettering and Newport Pagnell Turnpike Trust	1754	27 Geo. 2. c. 31	Kettering to Newport Pagnell Road Act 1754; An Act for repairing and widening the Road leading from the Toll Gate, in the Parish of Kettering, through the Town of Wellingborough, in the County of Northampton, and through Olney, over Sherrington Bridge, to Newport Pagnell in the County of Bucks; and for repairing and widening, or rebuilding, the said Sherrington Bridge.	Kettering	Newport Pagnell
Kettering and Northampton Turnpike Trust	1819	59 Geo. 3. c. xli	Road from Kettering to Northampton Act 1819; An Act for amending and keeping in repair the Road from Kettering to the Town of Northampton, in the County of Northampton.	Kettering	Northampton
Lincoln Turnpike Trust (South District)	1756	29 Geo. 2. c. 85	Lincoln and Peterborough Roads Act 1756; An Act for repairing and widening the Roads leading from the East Side of Lincoln Heath to the City of Peterborough, and from the East End of Marham Lane to the Town of Walton, in the County of Northampton, and from the Town of Bourne to the Town of Colsterworth, and from Donington High Bridge to the Cross Post in the Parish of Hacconby, and from the East End of a Lane called Hale Drove, to and through the Town of Old Sleaford, to the End of Long Hedge in the Parish of Quarrington in the County of Lincoln.	Market Deeping	Peterborough
Little Bowden and Rockingham Turnpike Trust	1793	33 Geo. 3. c. 143	Little Bowden and Rockingham Road Act 1793; An Act for repairing and widening the Road from the Foot of a certain Bridge in the Parish of Little Bowden, in the County of Northampton, commonly called Saint Mary's Bridge, to the West Side of the Toll Bar at the North End of the Town of Rockingham, in the said County.	Little Bowden	Rockingham
Lutterworth to Badby Turnpike Trust	1765	5 Geo. 3. c. 105	Banbury to Lutterworth Road Act 1765; An Act for repairing and widening the Road from the Turnpike Road in Banbury, in the County of Oxford, through Daventry and Cottesbach, to the South End of Mill Field, in the Parish of Lutterworth, in the County of Leicester.	Lutterworth	Badby
Market Harborough and Brampton Turnpike Trust	1752	25 Geo. 2. c. 57	Market Harborough and Brampton Road Act 1751; An Act for repairing and widening the Road leading from Market Harborough, in the County of Leicester, through Desborough, Rowell, Kettering, Barton Seagrave, and Thrapston, in the County of Northampton, and through Bythorne, Spaldwick, and Ellington, to the Pound in the Parish of Brampton, in the County of Huntingdon.		
Market Harborough and Welford Turnpike Trust	1722	8 Geo. 1. c. 13	Nottingham and Leicester Highways Act 1721; An Act for the amending the Highways leading from Brampton Bridge, near Church Brampton, in the County of Northampton, through the Parish of Thornby, to a Bridge called Welford Bridge, in the Parish of Welford, in the said County; and also the great Post Road, from a Place called Morter Pitt Hill, in the Parish of Pisford, in the said County, through the Towns and Parishes of Brixworth, Lamport, Maidwell, Kelmarsh, and Oxenden Magna, to a Bridge called Chain Bridge, leading into Market Harborough, in the County of Leicester.	Northampton	Market Harborough
Market Harborough and Welford Turnpike Trust	1722	8 Geo. 1. c. 13		Northampton	Welford
Northampton (Hardingstone to Lathbury) Turnpike Trust					
Northampton and Cold Brayfield Turnpike Trust	1827	7 & 8 Geo. 4. c. lxxi	Northampton and Cold Brayfield Road Act 1827; An Act for making and maintaining a Road from the Town of Northampton, in the County of Northampton, to Cold Brayfield, in the County of Buckingham.		
Northampton to Newport Pagnell Turnpike Trust	1710	8 Ann. c. 9	Northampton Highways Act 1709; An Act for repairing the Highways between the House commonly called The Horseshoe House, in the Parish of Stoke Goldington, in the County of Bucks, and the Town of Northampton.	Northampton	Stoke Goldington
Northampton to Newport Pagnell Turnpike Trust	1723	9 Geo. 1. c. 13	Buckinghamshire Highways Act 1722; An Act for the enlarging the Term granted by an Act passed in the Eighth Year of the Reign of Her late Majesty Queen Anne, intituled, "An Act for repairing the Highways between the House commonly called The Horseshoe House; in the Parish of Stoke Goldington, in the County of Bucks, and the Town of Northampton; and for repairing the Road from the North Bridge of Newport Pagnel, in the County of Bucks, to the said Horseshoe House."	Stoke Goldington	Newport Pagnell
Nottingham, Melton and Kettering Turnpike Trust; Nottingham and Kettering Turnpike Trust	1754	27 Geo. 2. c. 39	Bridgeford Lane, Nottinghamshire to Kettering Road Act 1754; An Act for repairing and widening the Road from the North End of Bridgeford Lane, in the County of Nottingham, to and through several Towns and Places, in the Counties of Nottingham, Leicester, Rutland, and through Rockingham to the Bowling Green at Kettering in the County of Northampton.	Nottingham	Kettering
Old Stratford to Dunchurch Turnpike Trust	1707	6 Ann. c. 77	Old Stratford to Dunchurch Road Act 1707; An Act for repairing the Highways from Old Stratford, in the County of Northampton, to Dunchurch, in the County of Warwick.	Old Stratford	Dunchurch
Oundle and Weldon Turnpike Trust	1794	34 Geo. 3. c. 126	Northampton Roads Act 1794; An act for repairing and widening the road leading from Saint Martin Stamford Baron to Kettering, and from Oundle to Middleton Lane, in the parish or hamlet of Middleton, in the county of Northampton.	Oundle	Middleton
Peterborough and Wellingborough Turnpike Trust	1754	27 Geo. 2. c. 23	Northamptonshire Roads Act 1754; An Act for repairing and widening the Road from the City of Peterborough, through Oundle and Thrapston, to Wellingborough, in the County of Northampton.	Peterborough	Wellingborough
Peterborough and Wellingborough Turnpike Trust	1772	13 Geo. 3. c. 91	Northants Roads Act 1773; An Act for enlarging the Term and Powers of an Act of Parliament of the Twenty-seventh Year of the Reign of His late Majesty King George the Second, for repairing and widening the Road from the City of Peterborough, through Oundle and Thrapston, to Wellingborough, in the County of Northampton; and for repairing and widening several other Roads near or adjoining thereto.		Elton
Peterborough and Wellingborough Turnpike Trust	1772	13 Geo. 3. c. 91	Northants Roads Act 1773; An Act for enlarging the Term and Powers of an Act of Parliament of the Twenty-seventh Year of the Reign of His late Majesty King George the Second, for repairing and widening the Road from the City of Peterborough, through Oundle and Thrapston, to Wellingborough, in the County of Northampton; and for repairing and widening several other Roads near or adjoining thereto.		Clopton
Stamford and Kettering Turnpike Trust	1794	34 Geo. 3. c. 126	Northampton Roads Act 1794; An act for repairing and widening the road leading from Saint Martin Stamford Baron to Kettering, and from Oundle to Middleton Lane, in the parish or hamlet of Middleton, in the county of Northampton.	Stamford Baron St Martin	Kettering
Thorney Road Turnpike Trust	1792	32 Geo. 3. c. 129	Cambridge Roads Act 1792; An Act for amending, widening, and keeping in Repair the Road leading from Swanspool Bridge, in the City of Peterborough, in the Town of Thorney, in the Isle of Ely, in the County of Cambridge, and for altering the Course of some Part of the said Road.	Thorney	Peterborough
Towcester and Cotton End Turnpike Trust	1795	35 Geo. 3. c. 153	Towcester to Hardington Road Act 1795; An Act for amending, widening, and keeping in repair, the road leading from Towcester to the turnpike road in Cotton End, in the parish of Hardingston, in the county of Northampton.		
Towcester, Brackley and Weston Turnpike Trust	1757	30 Geo. 2. c. 48	Oxfordshire Roads Act 1757; An Act for repairing and widening the Road from Towcester, through Silverston and Brackley in the County of Northampton, and Ardley and Middleton Stoney, to Weston Gate in the Parish of Weston on the Green in the County of Oxford.		
Wansford Turnpike Trust	1748	22 Geo. 2. c. 17	Northamptonshire Roads Act 1748; An Act for effectually amending and repairing the Road leading from Wansford Bridge, in the County of Northampton, to the Town of Stamford, in the County of Lincoln.		
Wansford Road Turnpike Trust	1754	27 Geo. 2. c. 30	Leicester to Peterborough Road Act 1754; An Act for repairing and widening the Road from the Borough of Leicester, to and by the North Side of the Town of Uppingham, in the County of Rutland, and to Wansford in the County of Northampton, and from thence to Peterborough in the said County of Northampton.		
Warwick and Northampton Turnpike Trust	1765	5 Geo. 3. c. 107	Warwick and Northampton Road Act 1765; An Act for repairing and widening the Road from the Great Bridge in the Borough of Warwick, through Southam and Daventry, to the Town of Northampton.	Warwick	Northampton
Wellingborough and Northampton Turnpike Trust	1797	37 Geo. 3. c. 167	Wellingborough and Northampton Road Act 1797; An Act for amending, widening, altering, and keeping in repair, the road leading from a place called Morton's Corner, in the town of Wellingborough, in the county of Northampton, to the east end of Abington Street, in the town of Northampton.	Wellingborough	Northampton

== Nottinghamshire ==
Trust	Founded	Initial act	
Trust	Founded	Citation	Title
Bawtry and East Markham Common Turnpike Trust; Scrooby Turnpike Trust	1766	6 Geo. 3. c. 67	Bawtry to Markham Road Act 1766; An Act for repairing and widening the Road from Bawtry in the County of York, to East Markham Common in the County of Nottingham and from Little Drayton to Twiford Bridge in the said County.
Bawtry Bridge to Hainton Turnpike Trust	1765	5 Geo. 3. c. 85	Notts and Lincoln Roads Act 1765; An Act for repairing and widening the Roads from Bawtry Bridge in the County of Nottingham, to Hainton in the County of Lincoln; and from North Willingham to the North End of the Lane between Dexthorpe and Langton; and from West Rassin to Pilford Bridge; and from the Great Road near Bishop Bridge to Bishop Norton Common; and from the Hamlet of Morton to Epworth; and from Haxey Field to The Trent, at Kinnald Ferry in the said County of Lincoln.
Bingham Turnpike Trust	1773	13 Geo. 3. c. 90	Nottinghamshire Roads Act 1773; An Act for repairing and widening the Road from Newark upon Trent, in the County of Nottingham, to join the Turnpike Road from Nottingham to Grantham, in the County of Lincoln, near the Guide Post on the Foss Road, near Bingham, in the said County of Nottingham.
Clown and Budby Turnpike Trust	1810	50 Geo. 3. c. lix	Road from Rotherham to Clown and Worksop Act 1810; An Act for making and keeping in Repair a Carriage Road from the Turnpike Road leading from Rotherham in the County of York, to Mansfield in the County of Nottingham, at or near Clown in the County of Derby, to the Turnpike Road leading from Worksop to Kellam, at or near Budby in the County of Nottingham.
Dunham and Darlton Turnpike Trust; Dunham Road Turnpike Trust	1765	5 Geo. 3. c. 54	Dunham Ferry and Great Markham Common Road Act 1765; An Act for repairing and widening the Road from Dunham Ferry to the South End of Great Markham Common, in the County of Nottingham.
Gainsborough and Retford Turnpike Trust	1787	27 Geo. 3. c. 71	Lincoln and Nottinghamshire Roads Act 1787; An Act for making, maintaining, and repairing a Road from the West End of the Bridge intended to be built at or near the Ferry over the River Trent, from Gainsborough in the County of Lincoln to the Parish of Saundby in the County of Nottingham, through the several Parishes of Saundby, Beckingham, Bole, North Wheatley, Hayton, and Clareborough, to East Retford, all situate in the said County of Nottingham, with a Side Branch from the Boundary Gate between the said Parishes of Beckingham and Saundby, through the said Parish of Beckingham and the Parish of Gringley on the Hill in the same County to the Town of Gringley on the Hill aforesaid.
Kirby and Pinxton Turnpike Trust	1788	28 Geo. 3. c. 99	Nottinghamshire and Derby Roads (No. 2) Act 1788; An Act for repairing and widening the Road from the Nottingham and Mansfield Turnpike in the Liberty of Blidworth, to the Mile Oak in the Parish of Kirkby in Ashfield in the County of Nottingham, and from thence through Pinxton to Carter Lane in the Parish of South Normanton, and from Pinxton to the Colliery near Pinxton Green in the County of Derby.
Kirklington and Hockerton Turnpike Trust	1774	14 Geo. 3. c. 101	Notts Roads Act 1774; An Act for repairing and widening several Roads near the Towns of Hockerton, Kirklington, Southwell, Normanton, and Winkbourne, in the County of Nottingham.
Leadenham and Southwell Turnpike Trust	1758	32 Geo. 2. c. 57	Lincoln and Notts Roads Act 1758; An Act for repairing and widening the Roads from a Place called Littlegate at the Top of Leadenham Hill in the County of Lincoln, to the West End of Barnby Gate in Newark upon Trent, and from the Guide Post at the Division of Kelham and Muskham Lanes to Mansfield, and from Southwell to Oxton in the County of Nottingham.
Mansfield and Tibshelf Turnpike Trust	1765	5 Geo. 3. c. 90	Notts and Derby Roads Act 1765; An Act for repairing and widening the Road from the Alfreton Turnpike Road, near a Place called Little Robins, in the Parish of Mansfield, in the County of Nottingham, through Woolley Moor, to the Nottingham Turnpike Road near Tansley in the County of Derby, and from Woolley Moor to the Chesterfield Turnpike Road at Kelstidge in the County of Derby.
Mansfield to Worksop Turnpike Trust	1822	3 Geo. 4. c. xxxvii	Road from Mansfield to Worksop Brecks Act 1822; An Act for amending, widening, altering and keeping in Repair the Road from the upper Part of Leeming Lane, in the Town of Mansfield, opposite to the End of Bath Lane, to the Turnpike Road leading from Worksop to Kelham, at or near the Corner of Worksop Brecks, all in the County of Nottingham.
North Road Turnpike Trust; Foston Bridge and Little Drayton Turnpike Trust	1725	12 Geo. 1. c. 16	Foston Bridge and Witham Common Road Act 1725; An Act for repairing the Road from Spittlegate Hill, near Grantham, in the County of Lincoln, to Little Drayton, in the County of Nottingham.
Nottingham and Derby Turnpike Trust	1758	32 Geo. 2. c. 53	Lincoln and Nottingham Roads Act 1758; An Act for repairing and widening the Roads from Grantham in the County of Lincoln, through Bottesford and Bingham, to Nottingham Trent Bridge, and from Chappel Bar near to the West End of the Town of Nottingham to Saint Mary's Bridge in the Town of Derby, and from the Guide Post in the Parish of Lenton to Sawley Ferrey.
Nottingham and Grantham Turnpike Trust	1758	32 Geo. 2. c. 53	Lincoln and Nottingham Roads Act 1758; An Act for repairing and widening the Roads from Grantham in the County of Lincoln, through Bottesford and Bingham, to Nottingham Trent Bridge, and from Chappel Bar near to the West End of the Town of Nottingham to Saint Mary's Bridge in the Town of Derby, and from the Guide Post in the Parish of Lenton to Sawley Ferrey.
Nottingham and Ilkeston Turnpike Trust	1764	4 Geo. 3. c. 83	Nottinghamshire and Derby Roads Act 1764; An Act for repairing and widening the Road from Bramcott Odd House in the County of Nottingham, to the Cross Post upon Smalley Common in the County of Derby, and from Ilkeston to the Towns of Heanor and Shipley in the said County of Derby, and from Trowell in the County of Nottingham to the Town of Nottingham.
Nottingham and Loughborough Turnpike Trust	1737	11 Geo. 2. c. 3	Nottinghamshire and Leicester Roads Act 1737; An Act for repairing the Road leading from the Trent Bridge, in the County of the Town of Nottingham (through Costock otherwise Cortlingstock Lane) to the Bridges commonly known by the Name of Cotes Bridges, in the County of Leicester.
Nottingham and Mansfield Turnpike Trust	1787	27 Geo. 3. c. 76	Nottingham to Mansfield Road Act 1787; An Act for amending, widening, and keeping in repair the Road leading from the Town of Nottingham to the Town of Mansfield in the County of Nottingham.
Nottingham and Newhaven Turnpike Trust	1758	32 Geo. 2. c. 38	Notts and Derby Roads Act 1758; An Act for repairing and widening the Roads from Chappel Bar near the West End of the Town of Nottingham, to Newhaven, and from the Four Lane Ends near Oakerthorpe to Ashborne, and from the Cross Post on Wirksworth Moor, to join the Road leading from Chesterfield to Chappel-en-le-Frith, at or near Longston in the County of Derby, and from Selston to Annesley Woodhouse in the County of Nottingham.
Nottingham, Melton and Kettering Turnpike Trust; Nottingham and Kettering Turnpike Trust	1754	27 Geo. 2. c. 39	Bridgeford Lane, Nottinghamshire to Kettering Road Act 1754; An Act for repairing and widening the Road from the North End of Bridgeford Lane, in the County of Nottingham, to and through several Towns and Places, in the Counties of Nottingham, Leicester, Rutland, and through Rockingham to the Bowling Green at Kettering in the County of Northampton.
Old Trent Bridge to Nottingham Turnpike Trust; Flood Road Turnpike Trust	1796	36 Geo. 3. c. 152	Nottingham Roads Act 1796; An act for raising, maintaining, and keeping in repair, the road from the north end of the bridge, commonly called The Old Trent Bridge, to the west end of Saint Mary's church yard, by way of Hollow Stone, in the parish of Saint Mary, in the town of Nottingham, and for erecting and maintaining such and so many flood bridges upon the said road as may be necessary to carry off the flood water, and for widening and improving the entrance into the town of Nottingham by way of Hollow Stone.
Retford and Littleborough Turnpike Trust	1824	5 Geo. 4. c. lvii	Spittle Head Bridge and Littleborough Ferry Road (Nottinghamshire) Act 1824; An Act for making and maintaining a Turnpike Road leading from the Eastern Side of a certain Bridge called Spittle Hill Bridge, over Moorgate Beck in the Parish of Clarborough in the County of Nottingham, to Littleborough Ferry in the same County.
Worksop and Kelham Turnpike Trust	1770	10 Geo. 3. c. 92	Nottingham Roads Act 1770; An Act for repairing and widening the Road from Worksop to the Turnpike Road at Kelham, and from Debdale Hill to the Great Northern Road at South Muskham, in the County of Nottingham.
Worksop to Retford Turnpike Trust	1822	3 Geo. 4. c. xxxviii	Worksop and West Retford Road Act 1822; An Act for amending, widening, altering and keeping in Repair the Road from the Eastern End of Potter Street, in the Town of Worksop, to the Bridge over the Chesterfield Canal, leading into the Town of West Retford in the County of Nottingham.

== Rutland ==
Trust	Founded	Initial act	
Trust	Founded	Citation	Title
Grantham Turnpike Trust	1738	12 Geo. 2. c. 8	Stamford and Grantham Road Act 1738; An Act for repairing the Road between Stamford and Grantham, in the County of Lincoln.
Nottingham, Melton and Kettering Turnpike Trust	1754	27 Geo. 2. c. 39	Bridgeford Lane, Nottinghamshire to Kettering Road Act 1754; An Act for repairing and widening the Road from the North End of Bridgeford Lane, in the County of Nottingham, to and through several Towns and Places, in the Counties of Nottingham, Leicester, Rutland, and through Rockingham to the Bowling Green at Kettering in the County of Northampton.
Leicester and Peterborough Turnpike Trust	1754	27 Geo. 2. c. 30	Leicester to Peterborough Road Act 1754; An Act for repairing and widening the Road from the Borough of Leicester, to and by the North Side of the Town of Uppingham, in the County of Rutland, and to Wansford in the County of Northampton, and from thence to Peterborough in the said County of Northampton.
Oakham Turnpike Trust	1773	13 Geo. 3. c. 108	Rutland Roads Act 1773; An Act for repairing and widening the Road from the North Turnpike Road near Scot Gate, otherwise Scot Gate, in the Town of Stamford, in the County of Lincoln, to Oakham, in the County of Rutland; and from Oakham, through Burley, to a Gate on the North Side of a certain Close in the said Lordship of Burley called Booth’s Close, adjoining to the Open Fields of Cottesmore, in the said County of Rutland.
