= British Museum Act 1767 =

Act of the Parliament of Great Britain

British Museum Act 1767 (Note: The citation of this act by this short title was authorised by section 5 of, and the second schedule to, the Statute Law Revision Act 1948. Due to the repeal of those provisions, it is now authorised by section 19(2) of the Interpretation Act 1978.)
- Act of Parliament
- Parliament of Great Britain
- Long title: An Act to enable the Trustees of the British Museum to exchange, sell or dispose of any Duplicates of printed Books, Medals, Coins or other Curiosities, and for laying out the Money arising by such sale in the Purchase of other things that may be wanting in or proper for the said Museum. (Note: These words are printed against this act in the second column of second schedule to the Statute Law Revision Act 1948, which is headed "Title".)
- Citation: 7 Geo. 3. c. 18
- Territorial extent: Great Britain

Dates
- Royal assent: 15 April 1767
- Commencement: (Note: Start of session.)
- Repealed: 30 September 1963 (Note: The British Museum Act 1963 (Commencement) Order 1963.)
Other legislation
Repealed by	British Museum Act 1963

Status: Repealed

Text of statute as originally enacted

The British Museum Act 1767 (7 Geo. 3. c. 18) was an act of the Parliament of Great Britain.

== Subsequent developments ==
The whole act was repealed by section 13(5) of, and the fourth schedule to, the British Museum Act 1963.

== See also ==
- British Museum Act
