= British Museum Act =

Stock short title used for UK legislation

British Museum Act is a stock short title used in the United Kingdom for legislation relating to the British Museum.

== List ==
- The British Museum Act 1753 (26 Geo. 2. c. 22)
- The British Museum Act 1767 (7 Geo. 3. c. 18)
- The British Museum Act 1805 (45 Geo. 3. c. 127)
- The British Museum Act 1807 (47 Geo. 3 Sess. 2. c. 36)
- The British Museum Act 1816 (56 Geo. 3. c. 99)
- The British Museum Act 1824 (5 Geo. 4. c. 39)
- The British Museum (No. 2) Act 1824 (5 Geo. 4. c. 60)
- The British Museum Act 1832 (2 & 3 Will. 4. c. 46)
- The British Museum Act 1839 (2 & 3 Vict. c. 10)
- The British Museum Act 1878 (41 & 42 Vict. c. 55)
- The British Museum (Purchase of Land) Act 1894 (57 & 58 Vict. c. 34)
- The British Museum Act 1902 (2 Edw. 7. c. 12)
- The British Museum Act 1924 (14 & 15 Geo. 5. c. 23)
- The British Museum Act 1930 (20 & 21 Geo. 5. c. 46)
- The British Museum Act 1932 (22 & 23 Geo. 5. c. 34)
- The British Museum Act 1938 (1 & 2 Geo. 6. c. 62)
- The British Museum Act 1955 (3 & 4 Eliz. 2. c. 23)
- The British Museum Act 1962 (10 & 11 Eliz. 2. c. 18)
- The British Museum Act 1963 (c. 24)

=== British Museum (No. 2) Act 1824 ===
The British Museum (No. 2) Act 1824 (5 Geo. 4. c. 60) was repealed by section 13(5) of, and the fourth schedule to, the British Museum Act 1963, which came into force on 30 September 1963.. The long title is "An Act to carry into Effect the Will of Richard Payne Knight Esquire, so far as the same relates to a Bequest by the said Richard Payne Knight of a Collection of Coins, Medals and other valuable Articles, to the British Museum; and to vest the said Collection in the Trustees of the said British Museum, for the Use of the Public." (Note: These words are printed against this act in the second column of second schedule to the Statute Law Revision Act 1948, which is headed "Title".)"

=== British Museum (Purchase of Land) Act 1894 ===
British Museum (Purchase of Land) Act 1894 (Note: Section 3.)
- Act of Parliament
- Parliament of the United Kingdom
- Long title: An Act to provide for the purchase of certain Lands belonging to the Duke of Bedford by the Trustees of the British Museum.
- Citation: 57 & 58 Vict. c. 34
- Territorial extent: United Kingdom

Dates
- Royal assent: 17 August 1894
- Commencement: 17 August 1894 (Note: The Acts of Parliament (Commencement) Act 1793.)
Other legislation
| Amended by | British Museum (Purchase of Land) Act 1894; British Museum Act 1963 |

Status: Amended

Text of statute as originally enacted

Revised text of statute as amended

Text of the British Museum (Purchase of Land) Act 1894 as in force today (including any amendments) within the United Kingdom, from legislation.gov.uk.

The British Museum (Purchase of Land) Act 1894 (57 & 58 Vict. c. 34) enabled the trustees of the British Museum to purchase 69 houses surrounding the museum from the Bedford Estate so that they could be demolished, and the museum buildings expanded to the west, north and east sides of the existing museum.

== See also ==
- List of short titles
- Copyright (British Museum) Act 1915 (5 & 6 Geo. 5. c. 38)
