= British Museum Act 1832 =

Act of the Parliament of the United Kingdom

British Museum Act 1832 (Note: The citation of this act by this short title was authorised by section 5 of, and the second schedule to, the Statute Law Revision Act 1948. Due to the repeal of those provisions, it is now authorised by section 19(2) of the Interpretation Act 1978.)
- Act of Parliament
- Parliament of the United Kingdom
- Long title: An Act to enable His Majesty, His Heirs and Successors, to appoint a Trustee of the British Museum. (Note: These words are printed against this act in the second column of second schedule to the Statute Law Revision Act 1948, which is headed "Title".)
- Citation: 2 & 3 Will. 4. c. 46
- Territorial extent: United Kingdom

Dates
- Royal assent: 23 June 1832
- Commencement: 23 June 1832 (Note: The Acts of Parliament (Commencement) Act 1793.)
- Repealed: 30 September 1963 (Note: The British Museum Act 1963 (Commencement) Order 1963 (SI 1963/1546).)
Other legislation
Repealed by	British Museum Act 1963

Status: Repealed

Text of statute as originally enacted

The British Museum Act 1832 (2 & 3 Will. 4. c. 46) was an act of the Parliament of the United Kingdom.

== Subsequent developments ==
The whole act was repealed by section 13(5) of, and the fourth schedule to, the British Museum Act 1963, which came into force on 30 September 1963.

== See also ==
- British Museum Act
