= British Museum Act 1902 =

Act of the Parliament of the United Kingdom

British Museum Act 1902 (Note: Section 2.)
- Act of Parliament
- Parliament of the United Kingdom
- Long title: An Act to enable the Trustees of the British Museum to remove certain newspapers and other printed matter from the present British Museum Buildings.
- Citation: 2 Edw. 7. c. 12
- Territorial extent: United Kingdom

Dates
- Royal assent: 22 July 1902
- Commencement: 22 July 1902 (Note: The Acts of Parliament (Commencement) Act 1793.)
- Repealed: 30 September 1963 (Note: The British Museum Act 1963 (Commencement) Order 1963 (SI 1963/1546).)
Other legislation
Repealed by	British Museum Act 1963

Status: Repealed

Text of statute as originally enacted

The British Museum Act 1902 (2 Edw. 7. c. 12) was an act of the Parliament of the United Kingdom, given royal assent on 22 July 1902 and repealed in 1963.

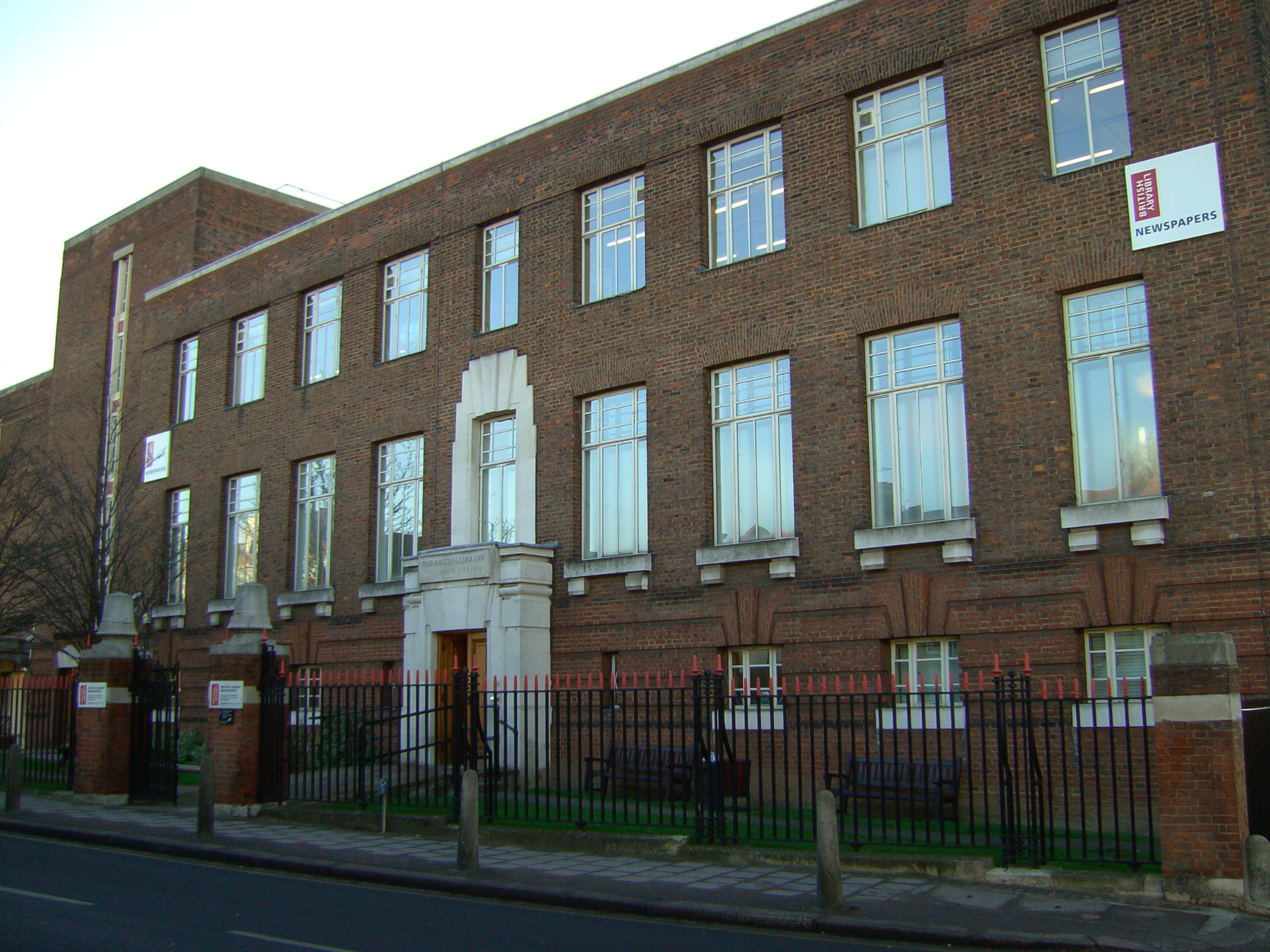
British Library Newspapers, Colindale

In order to alleviate the storage problems at the British Museum in London, England, it empowered the trustees to remove "newspapers and other printed matter which are rarely required for public use" to a new storage building at Hendon, on the condition that suitable arrangements were put in place for these materials to be consulted at the main buildings on request. These are to be found in the British Library Newspapers section located in Colindale.

== Subsequent developments ==
The whole act was repealed by section 13(5) of, and the fourth schedule to, the British Museum Act 1963, which came into force on 30 September 1963.

== See also ==
- British Museum Act
