= British Museum Act 1805 =

Act of the Parliament of the United Kingdom

British Museum Act 1805 (Note: The citation of this act by this short title was authorised by section 5 of, and the second schedule to, the Statute Law Revision Act 1948. Due to the repeal of those provisions, it is now authorised by section 19(2) of the Interpretation Act 1978.)
- Act of Parliament
- Parliament of the United Kingdom
- Long title: An Act to vest the Townleian Collection of Ancient Sculpture in the Trustees of the British Museum for the Use of the Publick. (Note: These words are printed against this act in the second column of second schedule to the Statute Law Revision Act 1948, which is headed "Title".)
- Citation: 45 Geo. 3. c. 127
- Territorial extent: United Kingdom

Dates
- Royal assent: 12 July 1805
- Commencement: 12 July 1805 (Note: The Acts of Parliament (Commencement) Act 1793.)
- Repealed: 30 September 1963 (Note: The British Museum Act 1963 (Commencement) Order 1963 (SI 1963/1546).)
Other legislation
Amended by	Statute Law Revision Act 1872; Statute Law Revision Act 1948
Repealed by	British Museum Act 1963

Status: Repealed

Text of statute as originally enacted

The British Museum Act 1805 (45 Geo. 3. c. 127) was an act of the Parliament of the United Kingdom that allowed the museum to acquire the Townley Collection from the estate of Charles Townley.

== Subsequent developments ==
Sections 1 and 6 of the act were repealed by section 1 of, and the schedule to, the Statute Law Revision Act 1872 (35 & 36 Vict. c. 63), which came into force on 6 August 1872.

The whole act was repealed by section 13(5) of, and the fourth schedule to, the British Museum Act 1963, which came into force on 30 September 1963.

== See also ==
- British Museum Act
