= Justices' Clerks' Fees (Middlesex) Act 1754 =

Act of the Parliament of Great Britain

- Act of Parliament
- Parliament of Great Britain
- Long title: An Act for making perpetual several Laws, for Punishment of Persons destroying Turnpikes, Locks, or other Works, erected by Authority of Parliament; and that all Acts made for erecting Courts of Conscience shall be deemed Publick Acts; and to empower a certain Number of the Trustees of The British Museum to do certain Acts; and for confirming the Table of Fees to be taken by the Clerks to the Justices of the Peace for the County of Middlesex; and for giving further Time for the Payment of the Duties omitted to be paid for the Indentures or Contracts of Clerks and Apprentices; and for filing Affidavits of the Execution of Contracts of Clerks to Attornies and Solicitors; and for preventing Persons driving certain Carriages from riding upon such Carriages.
- Citation: 27 Geo. 2. c. 16
- Territorial extent: Great Britain

Dates
- Royal assent: 6 April 1754
- Commencement: 15 November 1753 (Note: Start of session.)
- Repealed: 15 July 1867

Other legislation
- Amends: See § Continued enactments
- Repealed by: Statute Law Revision Act 1887; Criminal Justice Administration Act 1914; Statute Law Revision Act 1948; British Museum Act 1963
- Relates to: See Expiring laws continuance acts

Status: Repealed

Text of statute as originally enacted

The Justices' Clerks' Fees (Middlesex) Act 1754 (27 Geo. 2. c. 16) was an act of the Parliament of Great Britain that made perpetual and continued various older acts.

== Background ==
In the United Kingdom, acts of Parliament remain in force until expressly repealed. Many acts of parliament, however, contained time-limited sunset clauses, requiring legislation to revive enactments that had expired or to continue enactments that would otherwise expire.

== Provisions ==
=== Continued enactments ===
Section 1 of the act made the Destruction of Turnpikes, etc. Act 1731 (5 Geo. 2. c. 33) and the Destruction of Turnpikes, etc. Act 1734 (8 Geo. 2. c. 20), as continued by the Starr and Bent Act 1741 (15 & 16 Geo. 2. c. 33) and revived and continued by the Continuance of Laws Act 1746 (20 Geo. 2. c. 47), perpetual.

Section 2 of the act provided that from 1 January 1755, all acts of parliament for erecting courts of conscience for recovery of small debts would be deemed public acts.

Section 3 of the act provided that certain persons would serve as trustees or visitors for the British Museum (collection of Sir Hans Sloane) and Cottonian Library, naming the Archbishop of Canterbury, the Lord Chancellor/Lord Keeper, and the Speaker of the House of Commons as official trustees, establishing procedures for filling vacancies, and stipulating that these three principal trustees must be present at general meetings to authorize decisions, which would then have full force and effect regardless of any contrary law.

Section 4 of the act provided that tables of fees to be taken by clerks to justices of the peace in Middlesex would be laid before the lord chief justice of the King's Bench, the lord chief justice of Common Pleas, and the lord chief baron of the Exchequer (or any two of them) for approval, and required justices of the peace for Middlesex to create such fee tables at their general quarter sessions to be held after 24 May 1754, with provisions for approving these and subsequent fee tables at future quarter sessions.

Section 5 of the act provided that persons who had neglected to pay stamp duties on indentures or agreements for clerks, apprentices, or servants could receive relief by paying the rates and duties upon monies given or agreed, with such indentures to be stamped before 29 September 1754 (after public notice in the London Gazette), whereupon the documents would become valid in law or equity and the clerks, apprentices, or servants named could follow their intended trades or employment as if the duties had been properly paid originally, with all penalties incurred by such omissions discharged.

Section 6 of the act provided that persons who had failed to file required affidavits for contracts of clerks to attorneys could receive relief by filing them before Michaelmas term 1754, thereby avoiding all penalties and maintaining the legal effectiveness of such documents.

Section 7 of the act provided that drivers of carts, cars, drays, or wagons who rode without someone on foot or horseback to guide them (with certain exceptions) or who caused damage through negligence would forfeit up to ten shillings or face imprisonment up to one month, and could be apprehended without warrant by any witness.

== Subsequent developments ==
The Select Committee on Temporary Laws, Expired or Expiring, appointed in 1796, inspected and considered all temporary laws, observing irregularities in the construction of expiring laws continuance acts, making recommendations and emphasising the importance of the Committee for Expired and Expiring Laws.

The title from "for making" to "Parliament; and," and from "and for giving" to end of title was repealed by section 1 of, and the schedule to, the Statute Law Revision Act 1887 (50 & 51 Vict. c. 39).

The whole act except section 3 was repealed by section 44(2) of, and the fourth schedule to, the Criminal Justice Administration Act 1914 (4 & 5 Geo. 5. c. 58).

Section 3 of the act was repealed by section 13(5) of, and the fourth schedule to, the British Museum Act 1963.
