= List of acts of the Parliament of Great Britain from 1754 =

This is a complete list of acts of the Parliament of Great Britain for the year 1754.

For acts passed until 1707, see the list of acts of the Parliament of England and the list of acts of the Parliament of Scotland. See also the list of acts of the Parliament of Ireland.

For acts passed from 1801 onwards, see the list of acts of the Parliament of the United Kingdom. For acts of the devolved parliaments and assemblies in the United Kingdom, see the list of acts of the Scottish Parliament, the list of acts of the Northern Ireland Assembly, and the list of acts and measures of Senedd Cymru; see also the list of acts of the Parliament of Northern Ireland.

The number shown after each act's title is its chapter number. Acts are cited using this number, preceded by the year(s) of the reign during which the relevant parliamentary session was held; thus the Union with Ireland Act 1800 is cited as "39 & 40 Geo. 3. c. 67", meaning the 67th act passed during the session that started in the 39th year of the reign of George III and which finished in the 40th year of that reign. Note that the modern convention is to use Arabic numerals in citations (thus "41 Geo. 3" rather than "41 Geo. III"). Acts of the last session of the Parliament of Great Britain and the first session of the Parliament of the United Kingdom are both cited as "41 Geo. 3".

Acts passed by the Parliament of Great Britain did not have a short title; however, some of these acts have subsequently been given a short title by acts of the Parliament of the United Kingdom (such as the Short Titles Act 1896).

Before the Acts of Parliament (Commencement) Act 1793 came into force on 8 April 1793, acts passed by the Parliament of Great Britain were deemed to have come into effect on the first day of the session in which they were passed. Because of this, the years given in the list below may in fact be the year before a particular act was passed.

== 27 Geo. 2 ==
The seventh session of the 10th Parliament of Great Britain, which met from 15 November 1753 until 6 April 1754.

This session was also traditionally cited as 27 G. 2.

=== Public acts ===
Short title	Citation	Royal assent
Long title
Naturalization of Jews Act 1754 (repealed)	27 Geo. 2. c. 1	20 December 1753
An Act to repeal an Act of the Twenty-sixth Year of His Majesty's Reign, intituled, "An Act to permit Persons professing the Jewish Religion to be naturalized by Parliament; and for other Purposes therein mentioned." (Note: Naturalization of Jews Act 1753 (26 Geo. 2. c. 26)) (Repealed by Statute Law Revision Act 1867 (30 & 31 Vict. c. 59))
Taxation Act 1754 (repealed)	27 Geo. 2. c. 2	20 December 1753
An Act for continuing, and granting to His Majesty, certain Duties upon Malt, Mum, Cyder, and Perry, for the Service of the Year One Thousand Seven Hundred and Fifty-four. (Repealed by Statute Law Revision Act 1867 (30 & 31 Vict. c. 59))
Offenders (Conveyance) Act 1754 (repealed)	27 Geo. 2. c. 3	20 December 1753
An Act for the better securing to Constables and others the Expences of conveying Offenders to Gaol; and for allowing the Charges of poor Persons bound to give Evidence against Felons. (Repealed by Criminal Law Act 1826 (7 Geo. 4. c. 64), Statute Law Revision Act 1867 (30 & 31 Vict. c. 59) and Criminal Justice Administration Act 1914 (4 & 5 Geo. 5. c. 58))
Land Tax Act 1754 (repealed)	27 Geo. 2. c. 4	20 December 1753
An Act for granting an Aid to His Majesty, by a Land Tax, to be raised in Great Britain, for the Service of the Year One Thousand Seven Hundred and Fifty-four. (Repealed by Statute Law Revision Act 1867 (30 & 31 Vict. c. 59))
Mutiny Act 1754 (repealed)	27 Geo. 2. c. 5	20 December 1753
An Act for punishing Mutiny and Desertion; and for the better Payment of the Army and their Quarters. (Repealed by Statute Law Revision Act 1867 (30 & 31 Vict. c. 59))
Stannaries (Servants and Apprentices) Act 1754 (repealed)	27 Geo. 2. c. 6	5 March 1754
An Act to repeal a Proviso in an Act made in the Twentieth Year of His present Majesty's Reign, intituled, "An Act for the better adjusting and more easy Recovery of the Wages of certain Servants; and for the better Regulation of such Servants and of certain Apprentices," (Note: Regulation of Servants and Apprentices Act 1746 (20 Geo. 2. c. 19)) which provides that the said Act shall not extend to the Stannaries in Devon and Cornwall. (Repealed by Conspiracy and Protection of Property Act 1875 (38 & 39 Vict. c. 86))
Frauds in Manufacture of Clocks, etc. Act 1754 (repealed)	27 Geo. 2. c. 7	5 March 1754
An Act for the more effectual preventing of Frauds and Abuses committed by Persons employed in the Manufacture of Clocks and Watches. (Repealed by Master and Servant Act 1889 (52 & 53 Vict. c. 24))
Leith Harbour Act 1754	27 Geo. 2. c. 8	5 March 1754
An Act for improving and enlarging the Harbour of Leith; and to empower the Trustees therein mentioned to purchase Lands for that Purpose; and for erecting Docks and other Conveniencies on the Sides thereof.
Mutiny, East Indies Act 1754 (repealed)	27 Geo. 2. c. 9	5 March 1754
An Act for punishing Mutiny and Desertion of Officers and Soldiers in the Service of the United Company of Merchants of England trading to The East Indies; and for the Punishment of Offences committed in The East Indies, or at the Island of Saint Helena. (Repealed by Statute Law Revision Act 1867 (30 & 31 Vict. c. 59))
Supply, etc. Act 1754 (repealed)	27 Geo. 2. c. 10	6 April 1754
An Act for granting to His Majesty a certain Sum of Money, therein mentioned, out of the Sinking Fund; and applying certain Surplus Monies remaining in the Exchequer, for the Service of the Year One Thousand Seven Hundred and Fifty-four; and for the further Disposition of the said Sinking Fund, by paying thereout the Remainder of the Sum advanced on the Credit of the Duty on Sweets, and the Interest thereof; and for carrying the said Duty to the said Fund; and for the further appropriating the Supplies granted in this Session of Parliament. (Repealed by Statute Law Revision Act 1867 (30 & 31 Vict. c. 59))
Coinage Duties, etc. Act 1754 (repealed)	27 Geo. 2. c. 11	6 April 1754
An Act to continue the Duties for Encouragement of the Coinage of Money; and for removing Doubts concerning the Continuance of the Duty of Twenty Shillings for every Ton of Brandy, Wines, and Strong Waters, imported. (Repealed by Statute Law Revision Act 1867 (30 & 31 Vict. c. 59))
Navigation, Norfolk Act 1754	27 Geo. 2. c. 12	6 April 1754
An Act for improving and preserving the Navigation from Salter's Load Sluice in the County of Norfolk, to Standground Sluice in the County of Huntingdon, and from Flood's Ferry in the Isle of Ely in the County of Cambridge, to Ramsey High Load in the said County of Huntingdon, and also the Navigation from Old Bedford Sluice in the said County of Norfolk, to the River Nene in the Parish of Ramsey in the said County of Huntingdon.
Indemnity Act 1754 (repealed)	27 Geo. 2. c. 13	6 April 1754
An Act to indemnify Persons who have omitted to qualify themselves for Offices and Promotions within the Time limited by Law; and for allowing further Time for that Purpose. (Repealed by Statute Law Revision Act 1867 (30 & 31 Vict. c. 59))
Distemper Amongst Cattle Act 1754 (repealed)	27 Geo. 2. c. 14	6 April 1754
An Act to continue several Laws, relating to the Distemper now raging among the Horned Cattle in this Kingdom. (Repealed by Statute Law Revision Act 1867 (30 & 31 Vict. c. 59))
Persons Going Armed and Disguised Act 1754 (repealed)	27 Geo. 2. c. 15	6 April 1754
An Act to explain and amend an Act made in the Ninth Year of the Reign of His late Majesty King George the First, intituled, "An Act for the more effectual punishing wicked and evil-disposed Persons going armed and disguised, and doing Injuries and Violences to the Persons and Properties of His Majesty's Subjects; and for the speedy bringing the Offenders to Justice." (Note: Criminal Law Act 1722 (9 Geo. 1. c. 22)) (Repealed by Benefit of Clergy, etc. (No. 2) Act 1823 (4 Geo. 4. c. 54))
Justices' Clerks' Fees (Middlesex) Act 1754 (repealed)	27 Geo. 2. c. 16	6 April 1754
An Act for making perpetual several Laws, for Punishment of Persons destroying Turnpikes, Locks, or other Works, erected by Authority of Parliament; and that all Acts made for erecting Courts of Conscience shall be deemed Publick Acts; and to empower a certain Number of the Trustees of The British Museum to do certain Acts; and for confirming the Table of Fees to be taken by the Clerks to the Justices of the Peace for the County of Middlesex; and for giving further Time for the Payment of the Duties omitted to be paid for the Indentures or Contracts of Clerks and Apprentices; and for filing Affidavits of the Execution of Contracts of Clerks to Attornies and Solicitors; and for preventing Persons driving certain Carriages from riding upon such Carriages. (Repealed by Statute Law Revision Act 1887 (50 & 51 Vict. c. 59), Criminal Justice Administration Act 1914 (4 & 5 Geo. 5. c. 58), Statute Law Revision Act 1948 (11 & 12 Geo. 6. c. 62) and British Museum Act 1963 (c. 24))
King's Bench Prison Act 1754 (repealed)	27 Geo. 2. c. 17	6 April 1754
An Act for re-vesting in the Crown the Power of appointing the Marshal of Marshal of The Marshalsea of the Court of King's Bench, and for the better Regulation of that Office, and of the inferior Offices thereto belonging; and for re-building The King's Bench Prison. (Repealed by Statute Law Revision Act 1867 (30 & 31 Vict. c. 59))
Continuance of Laws etc., Act 1754 (repealed)	27 Geo. 2. c. 18	6 April 1754
An Act to continue several Laws, for prohibiting the Importation of Books re-printed Abroad, and first composed or written and printed in Great Britain; for the free Importation of Cochineal and Indico; and relating to Rice, Frauds in the Customs, the clandestine Running of Goods, and to Copper Ore; and for the better Encouragement of the making of Sail Cloth in Great Britain; and to authorize the Payment of the Bounty to Alexander Brown and others, upon a Ship fitted out for the Whale Fishery, and lost in the Greenland Seas; and for the more effectual Payment of the Bounties upon British-made Sail Cloth to Robert Donald and others. (Repealed by Statute Law Revision Act 1867 (30 & 31 Vict. c. 59))
Bedford Level Act 1754	27 Geo. 2. c. 19	6 April 1754
An Act for discharging the Corporation of the Governor, Bailiffs, and Commonalty, of the Company of Conservators of the Great Level of the Fens, commonly called Bedford Level, from a Debt due to the Duke of Bedford and Earl of Lincoln; and for enabling the Proprietors of Lands in the North Level, Part of the said Great Level, to raise Money to discharge the Proportion of the said North Level in the Debts of the said Corporation; and for ascertaining and appropriating the Taxes to be laid on the said North Level; and for the more effectual draining and preserving the said North Level, and divers Lands adjoining thereto, in the Manor of Crowland.
Distresses Under Justices' Warrants Act 1754 (repealed)	27 Geo. 2. c. 20	6 April 1754
An Act for the more easy and effectual Proceeding upon Distresses to be made by Warrants of Justices of the Peace. (Repealed by Summary Jurisdiction Act 1848 (11 & 12 Vict. c. 43))
Hockliffe and Stony Stratford Road Act 1754 (repealed)	27 Geo. 2. c. 21	20 December 1753
An Act to continue and render more effectual an Act passed in the Thirteenth Year of the Reign of His present Majesty, (Note: Hockliffe and Stony Stratford Road Act 1739 (13 Geo. 2. c. 9)) for repairing the Road between Hockcliffe in the County of Bedford, and Stoney Stratford in the County of Buckingham. (Repealed by Hockliffe and Stony Stratford Road Act 1830 (11 Geo. 4 & 1 Will. 4. c. lxxxiii))
Nottinghamshire and Leicester Roads Act 1754 (repealed)	27 Geo. 2. c. 22	20 December 1753
An Act for enlarging the Term and Powers granted by an Act of Parliament passed in the Eleventh Year of the Reign of His present Majesty, (Note: Nottinghamshire and Leicester Roads Act 1737 (11 Geo. 2. c. 3)) for repairing the Road leading from the Trent Bridge, (Note: Trent Bridge in Nottingham. 52°56′18″N 1°08′11″W) in the County of the Town of Nottingham, through Costock otherwise Cortlingstock Lane, (Note: Costock in Nottinghamshire. 52°49′55″N 1°08′43″W) to the Bridges commonly known by the Name of Cotes Bridges, (Note: Cotes Bridge takes the A60 across the River Soar near Cotes in Leicestershire. 52°46′49″N 1°10′49″W) in the County of Leicester; and for making the said Act more effectual. (Repealed by Trent Bridge to Cotes Bridge Road Act 1780 (20 Geo. 3. c. 87))
Northamptonshire Roads Act 1754 (repealed)	27 Geo. 2. c. 23	20 December 1753
An Act for repairing and widening the Road from the City of Peterborough, through Oundle and Thrapston, to Wellingborough, in the County of Northampton. (Repealed by Peterborough and Wellingborough Road Act 1823 (4 Geo. 4. c. viii))
Sussex Roads Act 1754 (repealed)	27 Geo. 2. c. 24	5 March 1754
An Act for amending, widening, and keeping in Repair, the Road leading from Union Point, near the Town of Uckfield, in the County of Sussex, to Langney Bridge, in the Parish of Westham, in the said County. (Repealed by Sussex Roads (No. 3) Act 1777 (17 Geo. 3. c. 97))
Saint Luke's Middlesex (Lighting and Watching) Act 1754 (repealed)	27 Geo. 2. c. 25	5 March 1754
An Act for the better enlightening and cleansing the Open Places, Squares, Streets, Lanes, Alleys, Passages, and Courts, within the Parish of Saint Luke, in the County of Middlesex, and regulating the Nightly Watch and Beadles; and for repairing the Highways within the said Parish. (Repealed by Statute Law (Repeals) Act 2013 (c. 2))
Kent Roads Act 1754 (repealed)	27 Geo. 2. c. 26	5 March 1754
An Act for enlarging the Term and Powers granted by an Act made in the Ninth Year of His present Majesty's Reign, intituled, "An Act for repairing and widening the Road leading from Saint Dunstan's Cross, near the City of Canterbury, to the Waterside at Whitstable, in the County of Kent." (Note: Kent Roads (No. 2) Act 1735 (9 Geo. 2. c. 10)) (Repealed by Road from Canterbury to Whitstable Act 1804 (44 Geo. 3. c. i))
Glasgow Roads Act 1754 (repealed)	27 Geo. 2. c. 27	5 March 1754
An Act to explain, amend, and render more effectual, an Act passed in the Twenty-sixth Year of the Reign of His present Majesty, intituled, "An Act for repairing several Roads leading into the City of Glasgow." (Note: Glasgow Roads Act 1753 (26 Geo. 2. c. 90)) (Repealed by Road from Glasgow to Redburn Bridge Act 1803 (43 Geo. 3. c. cx), Yoker Bridge and Dumbarton Road Act 1813 (53 Geo. 3. c. lxiii), Road from Glasgow to Garscube Act 1809 (49 Geo. 3. c. xxx) and Glasgow and Lanark Road Act 1843 (6 & 7 Vict. c. xxxix))
Market Harborough and Brampton Road Act 1754 (repealed)	27 Geo. 2. c. 28	5 March 1754
An Act for explaining, amending, and rendering more effectual, an Act made in the Twenty-fifth Year of His present Majesty's Reign, (Note: Market Harborough and Brampton Road Act 1751 (25 Geo. 2. c. 57)) for repairing and widening the Road leading from Market Harborough, in the County of Leicester, through Desborough, Rowell, Kettering, Barton Seagrave, and Thrapston, in the County of Northampton, and through Bythorne, Spaldwick, and Ellington, to the Pound in the Parish of Brampton, in the County of Huntingdon. (Repealed by Market Harborough and Brampton Road Act 1820 (1 Geo. 4. c. lxxx) and Road from Market Harborough to Brampton (Huntingdonshire) Road Act 1841 (4 & 5 Vict. c. xxxv))
Durham Roads Act 1754 (repealed)	27 Geo. 2. c. 29	5 March 1754
An Act for enlarging the Term and Powers granted by an Act passed in the Twenty-first Year of the Reign of His present Majesty, (Note: Durham Roads (No. 2) Act 1747 (21 Geo. 2. c. 27)) for repairing the High Road from Pierce Bridge to Kirkmerrington, in the County of Durham, and from thence to the Turnpike Road at Tudboe Lane End, in the said County; and for making the same more effectual. (Repealed by Durham Roads (No. 2) Act 1793 (33 Geo. 3. c. 161))
Leicester to Peterborough Road Act 1754 (repealed)	27 Geo. 2. c. 30	5 March 1754
An Act for repairing and widening the Road from the Borough of Leicester, to and by the North Side of the Town of Uppingham, in the County of Rutland, and to Wansford in the County of Northampton, and from thence to Peterborough in the said County of Northampton. (Repealed by %[%[Road from Leicester to Peterborough Act 1801]] ([[41 Geo. 3 (U.K.)41 Geo. 3%]%]. c. cxviii))
Kettering to Newport Pagnell Road Act 1754 (repealed)	27 Geo. 2. c. 31	5 March 1754
An Act for repairing and widening the Road leading from the Toll Gate, in the Parish of Kettering, through the Town of Wellingborough, in the County of Northampton, and through Olney, over Sherrington Bridge, to Newport Pagnell in the County of Bucks; and for repairing and widening, or rebuilding, the said Sherrington Bridge. (Repealed by Road from Kettering to Newport Pagnell Act 1823 (4 Geo. 4. c. lxvii))
Axminster Roads Act 1754 (repealed)	27 Geo. 2. c. 32	5 March 1754
An Act for repairing and widening the Road from a certain Entrenchment on Askerswell Hill, opposite to Chilcomb Farm through the Town of Bridport, to Penn Inn, and from Bridport aforesaid to the Town of Beamister, in the County of Dorset, and also the Road from Penn Inn aforesaid, through the Town of Axminster, to the Work-house at the East End of the Town of Honiton, in the County of Devon. (Repealed by Roads to and from Bridport Act 1819 (59 Geo. 3. c. lxxxviii) and Axminster Roads Act 1822 (3 Geo. 4. c. cv))
Bedford and Northamptonshire Roads Act 1754 (repealed)	27 Geo. 2. c. 33	5 March 1754
An Act for repairing and widening the High Road from Westwood Gate, in the Parish of Knotting, in the County of Bedford, through the Towns of Rushden and Higham Ferrers, and over Artleborough Bridge to the Turnpike Road in Barton Seagrave Lane, in the Parish of Barton Seagrave, in the County of Northampton. (Repealed by Bedford and Barton Seagrave Road Act 1822 (3 Geo. 4. c. lxxxvi) (Note: Incorrectly cited as "3 Geo. 4. c. xxxvi" in the Chronological Table of the Statutes.) and Annual Turnpike Acts Continuance Act 1876 (39 & 40 Vict. c. 39))
Bedford and Buckinghamshire Roads (No. 2) Act 1754 (repealed)	27 Geo. 2. c. 34	5 March 1754
An Act for repairing and widening the High Road, from a Place called Saint Loyds, in the Town of Bedford, through the Parishes of Bromham, Stagsden, Astwood, Hardmead, and Chichley, to the Way Post in Sherrington Field, where the said Road joins the High Road from the Town of Olney to the Town of Newport Pagnell; and also the High Road from Bromham aforesaid, through the Parishes of Turvey and Colebrayfield, to the Town of Launden, otherwise Lavenden, in the Counties of Bedford and Buckingham; and for applying Part of the Money arising thereby, towards repairing, re-building, or widening, Sherrington Bridge, in the Road from the said Way Post to the Town of Newport Pagnell. (Repealed by Road from Bedford to the Olney and Newport Pagnell Turnpike Road Act 1814 (54 Geo. 3. c. cxxiv))
Alloa Beer Duties Act 1754 (repealed)	27 Geo. 2. c. 35	6 April 1754
An Act for laying a Duty of Two Pennies Scots, or One Sixth Part of a Penny Sterling, upon every Scots Pint of Ale and Beer, brewed for Sale, vended, or sold, within the Town and Barony of Alloa, in the County of Clackmannan, and also a Duty of Anchorage for Ships and Vessels anchoring in the Harbour of the said Town, for repairing the Pier of the said Harbour. (Repealed by Statute Law Revision Act 1948 (11 & 12 Geo. 6. c. 62))
Warwick and Worcester Roads Act 1754 (repealed)	27 Geo. 2. c. 36	6 April 1754
An Act for repairing and widening the Roads from the Borough of Stratford upon Avon, in the County of Warwick, through Alcester in the said County and Feckenham, to a Place called Bradley Brook, in the County of Worcester, and from Alcester through Great Coughton and Crabbs Cross, in the said County of Warwick, and through Hewell Lane and Burcott, to the Cross of Hands on a Common called The Leekhay, and out of Hewell Lane, through Church Lane and Tutnell, to Bromsgrove in the said County of Worcester. (Repealed by Stratford-upon-Avon and Bradley Brook Roads Act 1821 (1 & 2 Geo. 4. c. xiii))
Lancaster and Yorkshire Roads Act 1754 (repealed)	27 Geo. 2. c. 37	6 April 1754
An Act for enlarging the Term and Powers granted by an Act made in the Eighth Year of the Reign of His present Majesty, (Note: Rochdale, Halifax and Ealand Road Act 1734 (8 Geo. 2. c. 7)) for repairing and widening the Road from the Town of Rochdale, in the County Palatine of Lancaster, leading over a certain craggy Mountain, called Blackstone Edge, in the same County, and from thence to the Towns of Hallifax and Ealand, in the County of York. (Repealed by Rochdale, Halifax and Ealand Road Act 1836 (6 & 7 Will. 4. c. viii))
Saint Nicholas and Saint Paul, Deptford (Poor Relief, etc.) Act 1754 (repealed)	27 Geo. 2. c. 38	6 April 1754
An Act for the better Relief and Employment of the Poor, in the Parish of Saint Nicholas, Deptford, in the County of Kent, and in the Parish of Saint Paul, Deptford, in the Counties of Kent and Surry; and for repairing the Highways, and paving and cleansing the Streets, in the said Parishes. (Repealed by London Government (Borough of Greenwich) Order in Council 1901 (SR&O 1901/267))
Bridgeford Lane, Nottinghamshire to Kettering Road Act 1754 (repealed)	27 Geo. 2. c. 39	6 April 1754
An Act for repairing and widening the Road from the North End of Bridgeford Lane, in the County of Nottingham, to and through several Towns and Places, in the Counties of Nottingham, Leicester, Rutland, and through Rockingham to the Bowling Green at Kettering in the County of Northampton. (Repealed by %[%[Road from Bridgford to Kettering Act 1801]] ([[41 Geo. 3 (U.K.)41 Geo. 3%]%]. c. cxvii))
Ratcliff Highway Act 1754 (repealed)	27 Geo. 2. c. 40	6 April 1754
An Act for opening, making, widening, and keeping in Repair, a Road from Ratcliff Highway, (Note: The Highway, London.) through Cannon Street, (Note: The B108 Cannon Street Road, London.) in the County of Middlesex, into the Road leading into the County of Essex; (Note: Whitechapel Road.) and also from the West End of Brook Street (Note: Brook Street was the name for the section of what is now Cable Street between Love Lane and Butcher Row.) into Cable Street, (Note: Cable Street.) and from Upper Shadwell Street (Note: Upper Shadwell Street (also known as High Street) was the name for the section of what is now The Highway, between Dellow Street and Brodlove Lane.) into the Back Lane (Note: Back Lane is now part of Cable Street.) in the said County of Middlesex. (Repealed by Commercial and East India and Barking Roads Act 1828 (9 Geo. 4. c. cxii))
Truro Roads Act 1754 (repealed)	27 Geo. 2. c. 41	6 April 1754
An Act for amending and widening several Roads, leading from the Borough of Truro, in the County of Cornwall. (Repealed by Truro Roads Act 1773 (13 Geo. 3. c. 112))
Leicester and Warwick Roads Act 1754 (repealed)	27 Geo. 2. c. 42	6 April 1754
An Act for repairing and widening the Road from Leicester to Narborough, and from Leicester to Coventry, and from thence through Kenilworth (Note: Kenilworth, Warwickshire. 52°21′00″N 1°34′52″W) to Warwick, (Note: Warwick, Warwickshire. 52°17′01″N 1°34′50″W) and from thence to Halford Bridge, (Note: Halford Bridge takes the A429 Fosse Way across the River Soar south of Halford, Warwickshire. 52°06′21″N 1°37′23″W) and from Warwick to Stratford upon Avon, and from Coventry to Martyn's Gutter, (Note: Martyn's Gutter is a stream, also known as Mardon Sich, which formed the boundary between the parishes of Stivichall and Stoneleigh. 52°22′45″N 1°30′56″W) leading towards Stoneleigh Town; and for supplying an Omission in an Act passed in the last Session of Parliament, (Note: Leicester Roads Act 1753 (26 Geo. 2. c. 46)) for repairing the Road from Leicester to Ashby de la Zouch, in the County of Leicester. (Repealed by Coventry Roads Act 1817 (57 Geo. 3. c. iv) and Hinckley, Nuneaton and Coventry Road Act 1825 (6 Geo. 4. c. x))

=== Private acts ===
Short title	Citation	Royal assent
Long title
Granger's Name Act 1754	27 Geo. 2. c. 1 Pr.	20 December 1753
An Act to enable John Granger Esquire and his Heirs to take and use the Surname of Leman, and to bear the Arms of Sir William Leman, deceased.
Naturalization of John Bazin, Lewis Ogier, Peter Guinard and Others Act 1754	27 Geo. 2. c. 2 Pr.	20 December 1753
An Act for naturalizing John Isaac Bazin, Lewis Ogier, Peter Guinard, and others.
Naturalization of Frederick Van Gehren Act 1754	27 Geo. 2. c. 3 Pr.	20 December 1753
An Act for naturalizing Frederick Von Gehren.
Naturalization of Casper Grevenkop Act 1754	27 Geo. 2. c. 4 Pr.	20 December 1753
An Act for naturalizing Caspar Grevenkop.
Confirming and establishing an exchange agreement concerning lands in Yorkshire, between the vicar of Gillig and James Shuttleworth.	27 Geo. 2. c. 5 Pr.	5 March 1754
An Act for confirming and establishing an Exchange agreed upon, between the Vicar of Gilling and James Shuttleworth Esquire, of certain Lands and Hereditaments in the County of York; and for other Purposes therein mentioned.
Kemp's Estate Act 1754	27 Geo. 2. c. 6 Pr.	5 March 1754
An Act for vesting the Estate of William Kemp Esquire, deceased, in Trustees, to be sold, pursuant to Articles; and for applying the Purchase-money for the Benefit of the Children of the said William Kemp, in such Manner as is directed by the said Articles.
Kitchen's Estate Act 1754	27 Geo. 2. c. 7 Pr.	5 March 1754
An Act to empower the Committee of the Estate of Elizabeth Kitchin Widow, a Lunatick, One of the Sisters and Coheirs of Sir Samuel Newman Baronet, deceased, to make Leases of her Estate during her Lunacy.
Simonburn (Northumberland) Inclosure Act 1754	27 Geo. 2. c. 8 Pr.	5 March 1754
An Act for dividing and enclosing Part of a certain Waste, or Common, called Simonburn Common, in the Manor and Parish of Simonburn, in the County of Northumberland.
Welton Inclosure Act 1754	27 Geo. 2. c. 9 Pr.	5 March 1754
An Act for dividing and enclosing the Common Fields, Common Pastures, Common Meadows, Common Pieces, Common Grounds, and Waste Ground, in the Manor and Parish of Welton, in the County of Northampton.
Shildon Moor or Great Shildon Common in Bywell (Northumberland) Inclosure Act 1754	27 Geo. 2. c. 10 Pr.	5 March 1754
An Act for dividing and enclosing Great Shildon Common, or Shildon Moor, within the Manor and Barony of Bywell, in the County of Northumberland.
Normanton Inclosure Act 1754	27 Geo. 2. c. 11 Pr.	5 March 1754
An Act for establishing and rendering effectual certain Articles of Agreement, for enclosing and dividing the Common Fields and Common Grounds, in the Manor and Parish of Normanton, in the County of Lincoln.
Enabling the Treasury to compound with Thomas Squire, Robert Lucas and Robert Stevenson, sureties for Philip Chapman for a debt due to the Crown.	27 Geo. 2. c. 12 Pr.	5 March 1754
An Act to enable the Commissioners for executing the Office of Treasurer of His Majesty's Exchequer, or the Lord High Treasurer, for the Time being, to compound with Thomas Squire, Robert Lucas, and Robert Stevenson, a Debt due to the Crown, from Philip Chapman, for which they are Sureties.
Inskip's Name Act 1754	27 Geo. 2. c. 13 Pr.	5 March 1754
An Act to enable John Lade, heretofore called John Inskip, and the Heirs Male of his Body, to take and use the Surname of Lade only, pursuant to the Will of Sir John Lade Baronet, deceased.
Naturalization of Daniel Mourgue and Amy Rillet Act 1754	27 Geo. 2. c. 14 Pr.	5 March 1754
An Act for naturalizing Daniel Mourgue Merchant and Amy Rilliet.
Naturalization of John Ulric Comerell Act 1754	27 Geo. 2. c. 15 Pr.	5 March 1754
An Act for naturalizing John Ulric Commerell.
Naturalization of Paul Bonifas Act 1754	27 Geo. 2. c. 16 Pr.	5 March 1754
An Act for naturalizing Paul Bonifas.
Enabling William Lord Cavendish of Hardwyck to take in England the oath of office of High Treasurer of Ireland, and to qualify himself in England for legal enjoyment of the office.	27 Geo. 2. c. 17 Pr.	6 April 1754
An Act to enable William Lord Cavendish of Hardwyck to take, in England, the Oath of Office of High Treasurer of Ireland; and to qualify himself here in England for the legal Enjoyment of the said Office.
Duke of Somerset's Estate Act 1754	27 Geo. 2. c. 18 Pr.	6 April 1754
An Act for Sale of a Capital Messuage in Lincoln's Inn Fields, in the Parish of Saint Giles in the Fields, in the County of Middlesex, and the Gardenground and Out-houses thereunto belonging (Part of the Estate of the most Noble Charles late Duke of Somerset, deceased); and vesting the same in Edmund Browne of Lincoln's Inn Esquire, and his Heirs for ever; and for laying out the Purchase-money in Lands and Hereditaments, to be settled to the like Uses, and upon the like Trusts, as the said Capital Messuage and Premises are now settled and subject unto.
Earl of Powis' Estate Act 1754	27 Geo. 2. c. 19 Pr.	6 April 1754
An Act for vesting the Manor of Hendon, settled on the Marriage of the Earl and Countess of Powis, on them and their Issue, in Trustees, to be sold, towards discharging the Debts and Encumbrances of William late Marquis of Powis; and for settling the Barony and Lordship of Powis, in the County of Montgomery, in Lieu thereof; and for other Purposes therein mentioned.
Rectifying a mistake and making more effectual a conveyance in fee farm, made by Henry Arthur Earl of Powis, of Mount Eagle Loyal manor and lands in Kerry.	27 Geo. 2. c. 20 Pr.	6 April 1754
An Act for rectifying a Mistake in a Conveyance in Fee-farm, made by Henry Arthur Earl of Powis, of the Manor of Mount Eagle Loyal, and divers Towns, Lands, and Hereditaments, in the County of Kerry; and making the same Conveyance effectual, for the Purposes therein mentioned.
Earl of Clinton's Estate Act 1754	27 Geo. 2. c. 21 Pr.	6 April 1754
An Act for vesting divers Lands and Hereditaments, in the County of Somerset, contracted to be sold by Hugh late Earl Clinton in his Life-time, in Trustees, to enable them to convey the same to the several Purchasers thereof, pursuant to their Contracts.
Viscount Cashels' Estate Act 1754	27 Geo. 2. c. 22 Pr.	6 April 1754
An Act for empowering Trustees to cut down and sell Timber, standing and growing upon the Estate of Inheritance of Thomas James Lord Bulkeley Viscount Cashels in the Kingdom of Ireland, an Infant, in order to raise Money for discharging Encumbrances affecting the said Estate; and for other Purposes therein mentioned.
Enabling Charles Fitzroy Scudamore to take in Great Britain the oath of office as Ingrosser of original writs issuing out of the High Court of Chancery in Ireland, and to qualify himself for the enjoyment of the office.	27 Geo. 2. c. 23 Pr.	6 April 1754
An Act to enable Charles Fitzroy Scudamore Esquire to take, in Great Britain, the Oath of Office, as Cursitor, or Clerk or Engrosser of Original Writs issuing out of His Majesty's High Court of Chancery, in the Kingdom of Ireland; and to qualify himself for the Enjoyment of the said Office.
George Pitt's Estate Act 1754	27 Geo. 2. c. 24 Pr.	6 April 1754
An Act for vesting the Estate of George Pitt Esquire, in the County of Suffolk, and Part of his Estate in the Isle of Purbeck, in the County of Dorset, in Trustees, to sell the same; and to apply the Purchase-money for discharging Encumbrances affecting his settled Estate; and for making a Recompense to him for the Charges and Expenses of making Buildings and Improvements upon the same Estate.
Colebrooke's Estate Act 1754	27 Geo. 2. c. 25 Pr.	6 April 1754
An Act for vesting the undivided Sixth Part of Robert Colebrooke Esquire, of and in the Manor of Goldstone, and divers Lands in the Parish of Ash, in the County of Kent, in Trustees and their Heirs, to enable them to make such Conveyances thereof as shall be necessary for effecting a Partition agreed upon between the said Robert Colebrooke and the Owners of the other undivided Parts of the same Manor and Premises.
Speke's Estate Act 1754	27 Geo. 2. c. 26 Pr.	6 April 1754
An Act for empowering Ann Speke, an Infant, to make Leases and Copyhold Grants of her Estates, in the County of Somerset, during her Minority; and for other Purposes therein mentioned.
Biddulph's Estate Act 1754	27 Geo. 2. c. 27 Pr.	6 April 1754
An Act for Sale of the settled Estates of Sir Theophilus Biddulph Baronet, in the County of Stafford, and City and County of the City of Lichfield, for raising Money, to discharge Encumbrances affecting the same; and for laying out the Surplus in the Purchase of other Lands, to be settled to the Uses therein mentioned.
Woollaston's Estate Act 1754	27 Geo. 2. c. 28 Pr.	6 April 1754
An Act for vesting certain Estates of Sir Isaac Lawrence Woollaston Baronet, an Infant, situate in the Isle of Ely, and Counties of Cambridge, Huntingdon, Lincoln, and Norfolk, in Trustees, to be sold or mortgaged, to raise Money, for Payment of his Sisters Portions; and for other Purposes therein mentioned.
Pryce's Estate Act 1754	27 Geo. 2. c. 29 Pr.	6 April 1754
An Act for vesting the Estates of John Powell Pryce Esquire, in the County of Montgomery, comprized in his Marriage Articles, in Trustees, to raise Money, by Sale of Part thereof, for discharging Encumbrances affecting the same; and for settling other Part thereof pursuant to the said Articles.
Vesting a lease of the manor of Elverton (Kent), granted by the dean and chapter of Canterbury to Ann Tenison, in Peter Saint Eloy and Samuel Smith, in trust for Thomas Tennison and heirs.	27 Geo. 2. c. 30 Pr.	6 April 1754
An Act for vesting a Lease, granted by the Dean and Chapter of Canterbury, to Ann Tenison Widow, deceased, of the Manor of Elverton, with the Appurtenances, in the County of Kent, in Peter Saint Eloy and Samuel Smith, in Trust for Thomas Tenison an Infant, and his Heirs; and for other Purposes therein mentioned.
Barber's Estate Act 1754	27 Geo. 2. c. 31 Pr.	6 April 1754
An Act for Sale of Part of the settled Estates of Robert Barber Esquire, for discharging Debts and Encumbrances; and for empowering him to sell and exchange other Parts of his settled Estates, for the purchasing and acquiring other Lands, of equal or greater Value, to be settled in Lieu thereof.
Huddleston's Estate Act 1754	27 Geo. 2. c. 32 Pr.	6 April 1754
An Act for exempting and exonerating the Estates devised by the Will of William Hudleston Esquire, deceased, to be sold, from the Jointure on Gertrude Rigby, Wife of Townley Rigby Esquire; and for charging an Annuity, or Rent-charge, of equal Value, on the Estates entailed by the said Will; and more effectually to enable the Trustees of the said William Hudleston to execute the Trusts reposed in them by the said Will.
Barker's Estate Act 1754	27 Geo. 2. c. 33 Pr.	6 April 1754
An Act for establishing and rendering effectual several Settlements and Agreements, made and entered into by Hugh Barker the Younger Esquire, deceased, for making a Provision for his Mother and Wife, and their Children, respectively.
Daly's Estate Act 1754	27 Geo. 2. c. 34 Pr.	6 April 1754
An Act for vesting Part of the Estate of Charles Daly Esquire, in the Kingdom of Ireland, in Trustees, to be sold, for the Payment of Encumbrances affecting the same prior to his Marriage Settlement.
Weymondesold's Divorce Act 1754	27 Geo. 2. c. 35 Pr.	6 April 1754
An Act to dissolve the Marriage of Charles Wymondesold Esquire with Henrietta Knight, his now Wife; and to enable him to marry again; and for other Purposes therein mentioned.
Henley's Divorce Act 1754	27 Geo. 2. c. 36 Pr.	6 April 1754
An Act to dissolve the Marriage of Peter Henley Esquire with Susannah Roberts, his now Wife; and to enable him to marry again; and for other Purposes therein mentioned.
Maydwell's Divorce Act 1754	27 Geo. 2. c. 37 Pr.	6 April 1754
An Act to dissolve the Marriage of John Maydwell with Catherine Perrin, his now Wife; and to enable him to marry again; and for other Purposes therein mentioned.
Naturalizing Mary Noguier etc. Act 1754	27 Geo. 2. c. 38 Pr.	6 April 1754
An Act for naturalizing Mary Noguier Widow; and for qualifying and enabling her, out of the Estate devised by the Will of John Noguier her Husband, to make a Provision for Anthony Noguier her only Son and Heir.
Naturalization of Charles Shreiber and Jean François de Cerjat Act 1754	27 Geo. 2. c. 39 Pr.	6 April 1754
An Act for naturalizing Charles Shreiber and Jean Francois Maximillien de Cerjat.

=== Sources ===
- Pickering, Danby, ed. (1766). The Statutes at Large. Vol. 21: From the 26th to the 30th Year of King George II. Cambridge: Joseph Bentham – via Internet Archive.
- Pickering, Danby, ed. (1766). The Statutes at Large. Vol. 21: From the 26th to the 30th Year of King George II. Cambridge: Joseph Bentham – via Google Books.
- Pickering, Danby, ed. (1766). The Statutes at Large. Vol. 21: From the 26th to the 30th Year of King George II. Cambridge: Joseph Bentham – via Internet Archive.
- Journals of the House of Commons. Vol. 26. London: His Majesty's Stationery Office. 1803. pp. 841–1019 – via Google Books.
- Chronological Table of and Index to the Statutes. Vol. 1: To the End of the Session 59 Vict. Sess. 2 (1895) (13th ed.). London: Her Majesty's Stationery Office. 1896. pp. 115–116 – via Google Books.

== 27 & 28 Geo. 2 ==
The first session of the 11th Parliament of Great Britain, which met from 31 May 1754 until 22 October 1754.

This session was also traditionally cited as 27 & 28 G. 2.

There were no public acts passed this session.

=== Private acts ===
Short title	Citation	Royal assent
Long title
Morin's Naturalization Act 1754	27 & 28 Geo. 2. c. 1 Pr.	5 June 1754
An Act for naturalizing Peter Michael Morin.

=== Sources ===
- Pickering, Danby, ed. (1762). The Statutes at Large. Vol. 21 - 26 George II to 30 George II - 1753 to 1756-7. Cambridge, Printed by J. Bentham – via Internet Archive.
- Pickering, Danby, ed. (1762). The Statutes at Large. Vol. 21 - 26 George II to 30 George II - 1753 to 1756-7. Cambridge, Printed by Joseph Bentham – via Internet Archive.
- Journals of the House of Commons. Vol. 27. London: His Majesty's Stationery Office. 1803. pp. 5–12 – via Google Books.

== See also ==
- List of acts of the Parliament of Great Britain
