= Val Gooding =

British businesswoman

Val Gooding, CBE was Chief Executive of Bupa, from 1998 to May 2008. She was appointed a CBE for services to business in 2002. She has been credited various entrepreneur awards since her Executiveship. Fortune magazine calls her one of the most successful women. She was named as the highest earning female executive in Britain during 2004, being paid more than £1.4 million in salary and bonuses.

== Career ==
Gooding joined BUPA from British Airways where she held a number of executive positions. She is a non-executive director of J Sainsbury plc (since January 2007) and of Standard Chartered Bank plc (since January 2005). She is a member of the council of the University of Warwick and of the advisory board of the Warwick Business School. She is a trustee of the British Museum, a non-executive director of the Lawn Tennis Association and a non-executive director of the BBC.

Val joined Premier Farnell in June 2011 as chairman.
