= British Museum Act 1963 =

Act of the Parliament of the United Kingdom

British Museum Act 1963 (Note: Section 13(1).)
- Act of Parliament
- Parliament of the United Kingdom
- Long title: An Act to alter the composition of the Trustees of the British Museum, to provide for the separation from the British Museum of the British Museum (Natural History), to make new provision with respect to the regulation of the two Museums and their collections in place of that made by the British Museum Act 1753 and enactments amending or supplementing that Act, and for purposes connected with the matters aforesaid.
- Citation: 1963 c. 24

Dates
- Royal assent: 10 July 1963
- Commencement: 30 September 1963 (Note: Section 13(2). The British Museum Act 1963 (Commencement) Order 1963 (SI 1963/1546).)
Other legislation
Amends	Justices' Clerks' Fees (Middlesex) Act 1754; British Museum (Purchase of Land) Act 1894; National Gallery and Tate Gallery Act 1954
Repeals/revokes	British Museum Act 1753; British Museum Act 1767; British Museum Act 1805; British Museum Act 1807; British Museum Act 1816; British Museum Act 1824; British Museum (No. 2) Act 1824; British Museum Act 1832; British Museum Act 1839; British Museum Act 1878; British Museum Act 1902; British Museum Act 1924; British Museum Act 1930; British Museum Act 1938; British Museum Act 1955; British Museum Act 1962
Amended by	Museum of London Act 1965; Superannuation Act 1965; Minister for the Civil Service Order 1968; Income and Corporation Taxes Act 1970; British Library Act 1972; British Museum (Authorised Repositories) Order 1973; Statute Law (Repeals) Act 1974; Statute Law (Repeals) Act 1978; Transfer of Functions (Arts and Libraries) Order 1979; British Museum (Natural History) (Authorised Repositories) Order 1982; National Heritage Act 1983; British Museum (Authorised Repositories) Order 1984; British Museum (Natural History) (Authorised Repositories) Order 1985; Transfer of Functions (British Museum (Natural History)) Order 1988; Museums and Galleries Act 1992; British Museum (Authorised Repositories) Order 1995; Natural History Museum (Authorised Repositories) Order 2006; Transfer of Functions (Museum and Other Staff) Order 2011; British Museum (Authorised Repositories) Order 2021

Status: Amended

Text of statute as originally enacted

Revised text of statute as amended

Text of the British Museum Act 1963 as in force today (including any amendments) within the United Kingdom, from legislation.gov.uk.

The British Museum Act 1963 (c. 24) is an act of the Parliament of the United Kingdom. It replaced the British Museum Act 1902 (2 Edw. 7. c. 12). It was introduced by the second ministry of the Conservative Prime Minister Harold Macmillan. The act forbids the British Museum and the Natural History Museum from disposing of their holdings, except in a small number of special circumstances. In May 2005 a judge of the High Court of England and Wales ruled that Nazi-looted Old Master artworks held at the British Museum could not be returned.

The act also made the Natural History Museum an independent organisation from the British Museum, with its own board of trustees.

== Provisions ==
=== Repealed enactments ===
Section 13(5) of the act repealed 18 enactments, listed in the fourth schedule to the act.

Citation	Short title	Description	Extent of repeal
26 Geo. 2. c. 22	British Museum Act 1753	The British Museum Act 1753.	The whole act.
27 Geo. 2. c. 16	Justices' Clerks' Fees (Middlesex) Act 1754	—	Section 3.
7 Geo. 3. c. 18	British Museum Act 1767	The British Museum Act 1767.	The whole act.
45 Geo. 3. c. 127	British Museum Act 1805	The British Museum Act 1805.	The whole act.
47 Geo. 3 Sess. 2. c. 36	British Museum Act 1807	The British Museum Act 1807.	The whole act.
56 Geo. 3. c. 99	British Museum Act 1816	The British Museum Act 1816.	The whole act.
5 Geo. 4. c. 39	British Museum Act 1824	The British Museum Act 1824.	The whole act.
5 Geo. 4. c. 60	British Museum (No. 2) Act 1824	The British Museum (No. 2) Act 1824.	The whole act.
2 & 3 Will. 4. c. 46	British Museum Act 1832	The British Museum Act 1832.	The whole act.
2 & 3 Vict. c. 10	British Museum Act 1839	—	The whole act.
41 & 42 Vict. c. 55	British Museum Act 1878	The British Museum Act 1878.	The whole act.
57 & 58 Vict. c. 34	British Museum (Purchase of Land) Act 1894	The British Museum (Purchase of Land) Act 1894.	Section 1.
2 Edw. 7. c. 12	British Museum Act 1902	The British Museum Act 1902.	The whole act.
14 & 15 Geo. 5. c. 23	British Museum Act 1924	The British Museum Act 1924.	The whole act.
20 & 21 Geo. 5. c. 46	British Museum Act 1930	The British Museum Act 1930.	The whole act.
1 & 2 Geo. 6. c. 62.	British Museum Act 1938	The British Museum Act 1938.	The whole Act
3 & 4 Eliz. 2. c.23	British Museum Act 1955	The British Museum Act 1955.	The whole act.
10 & 11 Eliz. 2. c. 18	British Museum Act 1962	The British Museum Act 1962.	The whole act.

=== Short title, commencement and extent ===
Section 13(1) of the act provided that the act may be cited as the "British Museum Act 1963".

Section 13(2) of the act provided that the act would come into force on a day appointed by the Treasury by statutory instrument.

British Museum Act 1963 (Commencement) Order 1963 (Note: Section 1.)
- Statutory Instrument
- Parliament of the United Kingdom
- Citation: SI 1963/1546
- Territorial extent: United Kingdom

Dates
- Made: 4 September 1963
Other legislation
Made under	British Museum Act 1963

Status: Current legislation

Text of statute as originally enacted

Section 1 of the British Museum Act 1963 (Commencement) Order 1963 (SI 1963/1546) provided that the act would come into force on 30 September 1963.

== Subsequent developments ==
Section 13(5) of, and schedule 4 to, the act were repealed by section 1 of, and part XI of the schedule to, the Statute Law (Repeals) Act 1974, which came into force on 27 June 1974.

Section 13(3) of the act was repealed by section 1(1) of, and part XIII of schedule 1 to, the Statute Law (Repeals) Act 1978, which came into force on 31 July 1978.

== See also ==
- British Museum Act
