= British Museum Act 1753 =

Act of the Parliament of Great Britain

British Museum Act 1753 (Note: The citation of this act by this short title was authorised by section 5 of, and the second schedule to, the Statute Law Revision Act 1948. Due to the repeal of those provisions, it is now authorised by section 19(2) of the Interpretation Act 1978.)
- Act of Parliament
- Parliament of Great Britain
- Long title: An Act for the purchase of the Museum or Collection of Sir Hans Sloane and of the Harleian Collection of Manuscripts and for providing one general repository for the better reception and more convenient use of the said collections and of the Cottonian Library and of the additions thereto. (Note: These words are printed against this act in the second column of second schedule to the Statute Law Revision Act 1948, which is headed "Title".)
- Citation: 26 Geo. 2. c. 22
- Territorial extent: Great Britain

Dates
- Royal assent: 7 June 1753
- Commencement: 11 January 1753 (Note: Start of session.)
- Repealed: 30 September 1963 (Note: The British Museum Act 1963 (Commencement) Order 1963.)
Other legislation
| Amended by | Statute Law Revision Act 1867 |
| Repealed by | British Museum Act 1963 |

Status: Repealed

Text of statute as originally enacted

The British Museum Act 1753 (26 Geo. 2. c. 22) was an act of the Parliament of Great Britain. The act provided for the purchase of the museum or collection of Sir Hans Sloane and of the Harleian Collection of manuscripts to be held in a new body, the British Museum.

== Subsequent developments ==
The whole act was repealed by section 13(5) of, and the fourth schedule to, the British Museum Act 1963. Bylaws, ordinances, statutes or rules in force immediately before the commencement of the British Museum Act 1963 under section 14 or 15 of the British Museum Act 1753 are not invalidated by the repeal of the British Museum Act 1753, but have effect in relation to each museum, with such modifications as may be necessary in consequence of the provisions of the British Museum Act 1963, as if they were rules made by the trustees of that museum under paragraph 5 of the first schedule to the British Museum Act 1963.

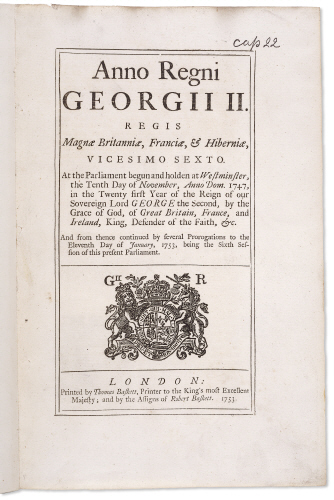

== See also ==
- British Museum Act
