= List of trustees of the British Museum =

The board of trustees of the British Museum comprises up to 25 members. One trustee is appointed by The Crown, 15 are appointed by the prime minister and five appointed by the trustees. Four trustees are appointed by the Secretary of State for Culture, Media and Sport on the nominations of the presidents of the Royal Academy, the British Academy, the Society of Antiquaries of London and the Royal Society. The current chair is George Osborne.

== Current trustees ==
The following is a list of current trustees, as of September 2025. Trustees are usually appointed for an initial term of four years. Appointments can be renewed with the prime minister's approval, but trustees can only serve for a maximum of ten years.

- Professor Abhijit Banerjee (Royal Trustee)
- Professor Dame Mary Beard
- Dame Tracey Emin
- Lord Daniel Finkelstein
- Professor Chris Gosden
- Philipp Hildebrand
- Tom Holland
- Dame Vivian Hunt
- Sir Jony Ive
- Dr Tiffany Jenkins
- Martha Kearney
- Jonathan Marland, Baron Marland
- Sir Charlie Mayfield
- George Osborne (chair)
- Alejandro Santo Domingo
- Weijian Shan
- Priyanka Wadhawan
- Professor Sir Mark Walport
- George Weston
- Claudia Winkleman
- Professor Dame Sarah Worthington

== Resignation of Adhaf Souief ==
Egyptian novelist Ahdaf Soueif resigned from the board in 2019, citing issues with "corporate sponsorship" by BP as well as the museum's refusal to repatriate artifacts such as the Parthenon Marbles which she felt should have been repatriated. The resignation was supported by staff members at the British Museum, who were reported by The Guardian to "expressed support" for Soueif. In a 2018 letter to The Guardian, chair of the trustees Richard Lambert stated that the Elgin Marbles should remain in the museum and opposed their repatriation to the Greek government.

== Former trustees ==
The British Museum Act 1753 established a 42 strong board of trustees, which included two representatives each of the Sloane, Cotton, and Harley families, elected representatives and the following ex-officio: Archbishop of Canterbury, Lord Chancellor, Speaker of the House of Commons, Lord President of the council, First Lord of the Treasury, Lord Privy Seal, Lord High Admiral, Lord Steward, Lord Chamberlain, the three Principal Secretaries of State, Bishop of London, Chancellor of the Exchequer, Lord Chief Justice King's Bench, Master of the Rolls, Lord Chief Justice Common Pleas, Attorney General, and Solicitor General.

This rose to 50 by the mid-1800s, including the addition of a trustee appointed by the Crown (British Museum Act 1832) and one representative each from the Towneley, Elgin, and Knight families.

The British Museum Act 1963 reduced the number of trustees to the current 25 and set the time-limit on appointments.

=== Former trustees from 1963 onwards ===
- Emeka Anyaoku
- John Addis
- Noel Annan, Baron Annan
- Heneage Finch, 4th Earl of Aylesford
- Lord Broers of Cambridge
- T. S. R. Boase
- John Boyd
- Barry Cunliffe (2000–2005)
- Edward Boyle, Baron Boyle of Handsworth
- Alec Broers, Baron Broers
- Ronald Cohen
- Dame Elizabeth Corley
- Clarissa Farr
- Francis Finlay
- Prince Richard, Duke of Gloucester (1973–present)
- Val Gooding
- Muriel Gray
- Stephen Green
- Bonnie Greer
- James Lindsay, 26th Earl of Crawford
- Edward Thomas Hall
- William Hayter (diplomat)
- Penny Hughes
- Olga Kennard
- John Kendrew
- Baroness Kennedy of the Shaws
- Peter Lasko
- Austen Henry Layard
- Richard Lambert
- Edmée P Leventis
- David Norgrove
- Mark Pears
- Grayson Perry
- Sir Paul Ruddock
- Amartya Sen
- Vikram Seth
- Minouche Shafik, Baroness Shafik
- Lord Powell of Bayswater
- Philip Stanhope, 5th Earl Stanhope
- Sir Richard Thompson, 1st Baronet
- George Townshend, 2nd Marquess Townshend
- Arnold Weinstock (1985–1996)
- G. M. Young

=== Notable former trustees 1753–1963 ===
Given the large number of ex-officio and family representatives, this list will only include those trustees who are notable for their work with regard to the British Museum.

- Joseph Banks (1788–1820) ex-officio as president of the Royal Society
- Clayton Mordaunt Cracherode (1730–1799), trustee 1784–1799, a major collector of prints and books, who left his important collections to the museum.
- Charles Townley (1737–1805), trustee from 1791, his vast collection of Graeco-Roman marbles, bronzes and terracottas was acquired by the museum after his death, and a family trustee seat created.
