= List of statutory instruments of the United Kingdom, 1963 =

This is an incomplete list of statutory instruments of the United Kingdom in 1963.

== Statutory instruments ==
=== 1-499 ===
- South Warwickshire Water Board Order 1963 (SI 1963/38)
- North Wilts Water Board Order 1963 (SI 1963/63)
- Pipe-lines (Notices) Regulations 1963 (SI 1963/151)
- Wessex Water Board Order 1963 (SI 1963/153)
- Bolton Water Order 1962 (SI 1963/209)
- Northallerton and the Dales Water Board Order 1962 (SI 1963/261)
- Potts Ghyll Mine (Storage Battery Locomotives) Special Regulations 1963 (SI 1963/270)
- Consular Conventions (Kingdom of Denmark) Order 1963 (SI 1963/370)
- Exchange of Securities Rules 1963 (SI 1963/490)
- Road Vehicles (Index Marks) (Amendment) Regulations 1963 (SI 1963/494)

=== 500-999 ===
- National Insurance (New Entrants Transitional) Amendment Regulations 1963 (SI 1963/502)
- Companies Registration Office (Fees) Order 1963 (SI 1963/511)
- Sheffield Water (Dearne Valley) Order 1963 (SI 1963/572)
- Companies Registration Office (Fees) (No. 2) Order 1963 (SI 1963/596)
- Prison Commissioners Dissolution Order 1963 (SI 1963/597)
- Doncaster and District Joint Water Board Order 1963 (SI 1963/599)
- Consular Conventions (Spanish State) Order 1963 (SI 1963/614)
- Consular Conventions (Income Tax) (Kingdom of Denmark) Order 1963 (SI 1963/615)
- Double Taxation Relief (Taxes on Income) (Israel) Order 1963 (SI 1963/616)
- East Surrey Water Order 1963 (SI 1963/657)
- North Derbyshire Water Board Order 1962 (SI 1963/660)
- National Insurance (Consequential Provisions) Regulations 1963 (SI 1963/676)
- House to House Collections Regulations 1963 (SI 1963/684)
- Town and Country Planning (Use Classes) Order 1963 (SI 1963/708)
- Betting Levy Appeal Tribunal (England and Wales) Rules 1963 (SI 1963/748)
- Criminal Justice Act 1961 (Commencement No. 2) Order 1963 (SI 1963/755)
- Clergy Pensions (Channel Islands) Order 1963 (SI 1963/785)
- South West Devon Water Board Order 1963 (SI 1963/793)
- Various Trunk Roads (Prohibition of Waiting) Order 1963 (SI 1963/814)
- Chislet Mine (Electric Trolley Locomotives) Special Regulations 1963 (SI 1963/896)
- Llanharry Mine (Storage Battery Locomotives) Special Regulations 1963 (SI 1963/906)
- Cycle Racing on Highways (Amendment) Regulations 1963 (SI 1963/929)
- National Parks and Access to the Countryside (Amendment) Regulations 1963 (SI 1963/968)
- National Insurance (Modification of the Royal Naval Pension Scheme) (Amendment) Regulations 1963 (SI 1963/970)
- Manorial Documents (Amendment) Rules 1963 (SI 1963/976)
- Tithe (Copies of Instruments of Apportionment) (Amendment) Rules 1963 (SI 1963/977)
- Local Government (Compensation) Regulations 1963 (SI 1963/999)

=== 1000-1499 ===
- Horsey Island Mussel Fishery Order 1963 (SI 1963/1005)
- Copyright (Falkland Islands) Order 1963 (SI 1963/1037)
- Copyright (St. Helena) Order 1963 (SI 1963/1038)
- Air Corporations (General Staff, Pilots and Officers Pensions) (Amendment) Regulations 1963 (SI 1963/1068)
- Easton Mine (Diesel, Diesel-Electric and Storage Battery Vehicles) Special Regulations 1963 (SI 1963/1074)
- Air Corporations (General Staff, Pilots and Officers Pensions) (Amendment) (No. 2) Regulations 1963 (SI 1963/1108)
- Transport Boards (Payments for Rating Authorities) Regulations 1963 (SI 1963/1109)
- Foreign Compensation (Hungary) Order 1963 (SI 1963/1148)
- East Lincolnshire Water Board Order 1963 (SI 1963/1159)
- Government Annuity Table Order 1963 (SI 1963/1178)
- Federated Superannuation System for Universities (Reckoning of Certain previous Service) Regulations 1963 (SI 1963/1219)
- Superannuation (Transfer of Agricultural Staff) Rules 1963 (SI 1963/1220)
- Meat Inspection Regulations 1963 (SI 1963/1229)
- National Insurance (Non-participation-Assurance of Equivalent Pension Benefits) Amendment Regulations 1963 (SI 1963/1265)
- Animals (Cruel Poisons) Regulations 1963 (SI 1963/1278)
- Merchant Shipping (Certificates of Competency as A.B.) (Ghana) Order 1963 (SI 1963/1316)
- Double Taxation Relief (Estate Duty) (France) Order 1963 (SI 1963/1319)
- Statistics of Trade Act 1947 (Amendment of Schedule) Order 1963 (SI 1963/1329)
- Central Nottinghamshire Water Board Order 1963 (SI 1963/1332)
- Portsmouth & Gosport Water (Regnum Area) Order 1963 (SI 1963/1333)
- Lifting Machines (Particulars of Examinations) Order 1963 (SI 1963/1382)
- Bread and Flour Regulations 1963 (SI 1963/1435)
- Schools (Amending) Regulations 1963 (SI 1963/1468)
- Sabah, Sarawak and Singapore (State Constitutions) Order in Council 1963 (SI 1963/1493)
- Registration of Government Ships (British Antarctic Territory) Order 1963 (SI 1963/1494)
- Tribunals and Inquiries (Guernsey) Order 1963 (SI 1963/1496)

=== 1500-1999 ===
- Wirral Water Board Order 1963 (SI 1963/1508)
- British Museum Act 1963 (Commencement) Order 1963 (SI 1963/1546)
- Children and Young Persons Act 1963 (Commencement No. 1) Order 1963 (SI 1963/1561)
- Stock Transfer Act 1963 (Commencement) Order 1963 (SI 1963/1592)
- West Suffolk Water Board Order 1963 (SI 1963/1622)
- Service Departments Registers (Amendment) Order 1963 (SI 1963/1624)
- Shipowners' Liability (Colonial Territories) Order in Council 1963 (SI 1963/1632)
- Government Bearer Bond (Prescribed Securities) Order 1963 (SI 1963/1701)
- Weights and Measures Regulations 1963 (SI 1963/1710)
- Doncaster and District Joint Water Board (No. 2) Order 1963 (SI 1963/1736)
- Registered Securities (Completion of Blank Transfers) Order 1963 (SI 1963/1743)
- Radioactive Substances (Waste Closed Sources) Exemption Order 1963 (SI 1963/1831)
- Radioactive Substances (Schools etc.) Exemption Order 1963 (SI 1963/1832)
- Radioactive Substances (Precipitated Phosphate) Exemption Order 1963 (SI 1963/1836)
- National Insurance (Modification of the Army Pension Scheme) (Amendment) Regulations 1963 (SI 1963/1862)
- Radioactive Substances (Waste Closed Sources) Exemption (Scotland) Order 1963 (SI 1963/1877) (S. 94)
- Slaughter of Animals (Stunning Pens) (Scotland) Regulations 1963 (SI 1963/1888)
- Wireless Telegraphy (Control of Interference from Electro-Medical Apparatus) Regulations 1963 (SI 1963/1895)
- Consular Conventions (Republic of Austria) Order 1963 (SI 1963/1927)
- Government Bearer Bond (Prescribed Securities) (No. 2) Order 1963 (SI 1963/1958)
- National Insurance (Modification of the Air Force Pension Scheme) (Amendment) Regulations 1963 (SI 1963/1987)
- National Insurance (Non-participation-Assurance of Equivalent Pension Benefits) Amendment (No. 2) Regulations 1963 (SI 1963/1988)
- National Assistance (Compensation) (Amendment) Regulations 1963 (SI 1963/1991)

=== 2000-2126 ===
- Import Duty Reliefs Order 1963 (SI 1963/2013)
- British Transport Commission (Transfer of Functions) (Appointments and Nominations) Order 1963 (SI 1963/2023)
- Children and Young Persons Act 1963 (Commencement No. 2) Order 1963 (SI 1963/2056)
- Federation of Rhodesia and Nyasaland (Dissolution) Order in Council 1963 (SI 1963/2085)
- Consular Conventions (Income Tax) (Republic of Austria) Order 1963 (SI 1963/2103)
- Vehicles (Conditions of Use on Footpaths) Regulations 1963 (SI 1963/2126)

== See also ==
- List of statutory instruments of the United Kingdom
