= Cy-près doctrine in English law =

Doctrine concerning charitable trusts

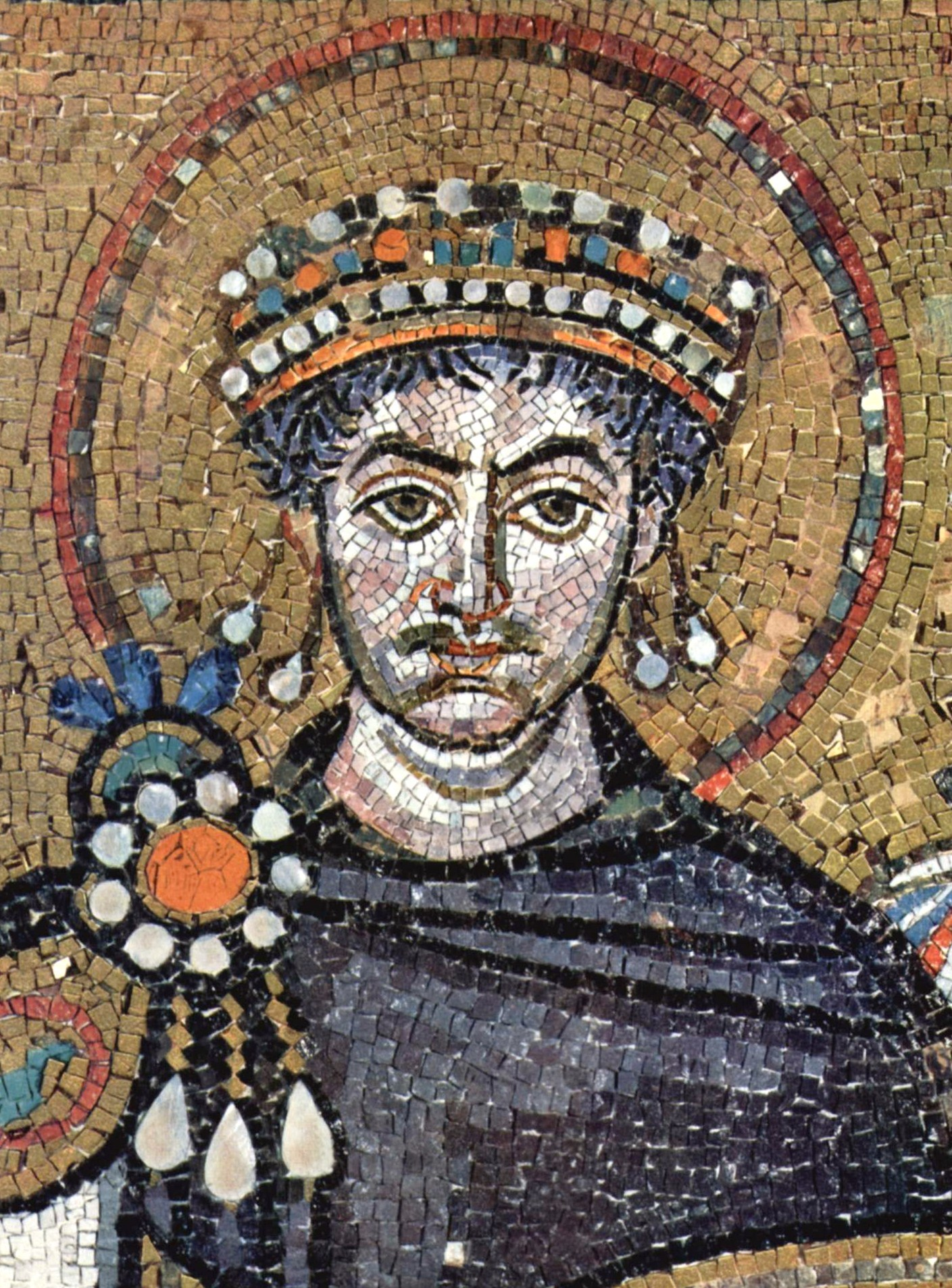
The Byzantine Emperor Justinian I, who commissioned the Corpus Juris Civilis, mentioning a Roman legal process similar to the cy-près doctrine

The cy-pres doctrine in English law is an element of trusts law that deals with charitable trusts. The doctrine states that when such a trust has failed because its purposes are either impossible or cannot be fulfilled, the High Court of Justice or the Charity Commission can issue an order redirecting the trust's funds to the nearest possible purpose. For charities worth under £5,000 and without land, the trustees (by a two-thirds majority) may decide to redirect the trust's funds. The doctrine was initially part of ecclesiastical law, originating from the Norman French phrase cy près comme possible (as close as possible), but similar and possibly ancestral provisions have been found in Roman law, both in the Corpus Juris Civilis and later Byzantine law.

Trusts to which the doctrine is applicable are divided into two groups: those with subsequent failure, where the trust's purpose has failed after coming into operation, and initial failure, where the trust's purposes are immediately invalid. Subsequent failure cases simply require redirecting the funds to the nearest possible purpose, as there's no question of allowing the settlor's next of kin to inherit the money. However, initial failure cases require a decision not only on whether the purpose has failed, but also on whether the funds should be subject to cy-près or returned to the estate in a resulting trust. This decision is based on the charitable intention of the settlor, which is determined based on the facts of each individual case.

== Definition and origin ==
The cy-près doctrine is the idea that, where a charitable trust's purposes are impossible or cannot be fulfilled for whatever reason, the funds should be reapplied to purposes as close as possible to the trust's original goals. This is done through a formal application by the trustees, either to the High Court of Justice or the Charity Commission. This doctrine originated in ecclesiastical law, the name coming as a contraction of the Norman French cy près comme possible (as close as possible), It was originally justified in an ecclesiastical way; charitable gifts were provided to secure entry into heaven, and if the charitable gift failed, this would not be guaranteed. If it was re-purposed, however, entry would be granted. The local bishop, therefore, would usually simply apply the gift to the nearest possible purpose to the testator's original goals.

Some evidence suggests that the doctrine descends from Roman law. The Corpus Juris Civilis mentions a process that redirected money collected to celebrate a person's life in some way that violated law to a purpose within the law. It also gives a similar justification: "[I]t would be unjust that the amount which [the testator] has destined to that end should revert to the heirs. Therefore, let an investigation be made to ascertain how the trust may be employed so that the memory of the deceased may be preserved in some other and lawful manner." The Byzantine Empire used a system similar to cy-près when dealing with piae causae, charitable corporations, whereby if the corporation fell its possessions were to be transferred to the Papal treasury and spent on a purpose as close as possible to that of the original corporation.

== Requirements ==
Prior to the Charities Act 1960 (8 & 9 Eliz. 2. c. 58), situations where the cy-près doctrine applied were limited to cases where the trust's purpose was either impossible or impracticable. The 1960 Act, however, provides in Section 13(1) (now part of the Charities Act 1993) that cy-près can apply where the original purposes have:

(a) been as far as may be fulfilled; or cannot be carried out, or not according to the directions given and to the spirit of the gift;
(b) or where the original purposes provide a use for part only of the property available by virtue of the gift;
(c) where the property available by virtue of the gift and other property applicable for similar purposes can be more effectively used in conjunction, and to that end can suitably, regard being had to the spirit of the gift, be made applicable to common purposes;
(d) or where the original purposes were laid down by reference to an area which then was but has ceased to be a unit for some other purpose, or by reference to a class of persons or to an area which has for any reason since ceased to be suitable, regard being had to the spirit of the gift, or to be practical in administering the gift;
(e) or where the original purposes, in whole or in part, have since they were laid down been adequately provided for by other means; or ceased, as being useless or harmful to the community or for other reasons, to be in law charitable; or ceased in any other way to provide a suitable and effective method of using the property available by virtue of the gift, regarding being had to the spirit of the gift.

This definition was amended by the Charities Act 2006 to replace "the spirit of the gift" with "the appropriate considerations," which are defined as "(on the one hand) the spirit of the gift concerned, and (on the other) the social and economic circumstances prevailing at the time of the proposed alteration of the original purposes". In the case of extremely small charitable trusts (where the charity has an income of less than £5,000 and holds no land) the trustees may agree by a two-thirds majority to transfer the property to another charity, without involving the High Court or Commission. This is contained in Sections 74-5 of the 1993 Act. Once the decision is reached, public notice must be given, and the Commission informed. Cy-près powers are now enacted in the Charities Act 2011.

=== Subsequent failure ===
The cy-près doctrine applies to two types of situations: subsequent failures and initial failures. Subsequent failures are where money has already been applied to a charitable purpose, and that purpose has failed. It does not allow the next of kin of the original donor to recover any money, as said in Re Wright: "Once money has been effectually dedicated to charity, whether in pursuance of a general or a particular charitable intent, the testator's next of kin or residuary legatees are forever excluded". The courts instead simply determine whether or not the reason for failure falls within Section 13, based on the basic intention underlying the original gift.

=== Initial failure ===
Cases of initial failure are where, rather than an established charitable trust failing, a gift has failed at the moment of its creation by having an invalid purpose. This raises different questions, as it is a matter of deciding "has the original charitable gift failed, and, if it has, can the money be applied cy-près or must it go on resulting trust to the settlor's estate"?

When deciding if a gift has failed, attention is first turned to the wording of the trust instrument. The terms of such documents are taken literally; if a particular organisation or purpose is given, the settlor's intention is considered to be no wider or narrower than this. A different approach is used when dealing with cases like Re Faraker, which dealt with a situation where the charity named in the gift had been amalgamated with others. The Court of Appeal held that the amalgamated charities were entitled to the gift, since the charity named effectively continued as part of the amalgamated one. Farwell LJ wrote that, "In all these cases one has to consider not so much the means to the end as the charitable end which is in view, and so long as the charitable end is well established the means are only machinery, and no alteration of the machinery can destroy the charitable trust for the benefit of which the machinery is provided."

In Re Finger, Goff J made a distinction between gifts to incorporated bodies and gifts to unincorporated bodies. When a gift is to an unincorporated body, it must be treated, whatever the wording, as a gift to that body's purpose. This is because unincorporated bodies cannot possess things. If the body has ceased to exist but the purpose continues, the gift has not failed. Incorporated bodies on the other hand can possess property, and as such, as said by Buckley J in Re Vernon's Will Trust, "A bequest to a corporate body ... takes effect simply as a gift to that body beneficially, unless there are circumstances which show that the recipient is to take the gift as a trustee."

Once it has been decided that the gift has failed, the courts consider whether the gift may be applied cy-près. The gift must show charitable intention; that the settlor intended not just a gift to a particular (failed) purpose or organisation, but a more general charitable intention. This is something decided on the facts of each individual case, but some general principles are in place; external evidence is admissible to override any prima facie interpretation that a gift is for non-charitable purposes, as in Re Satterthwaite's Will Trusts, and charitable intention can be found in cases where a non-existent charity is the recipient of the settlor's gift, as in Re Harwood.

== Bibliography ==
- Edwards, Richard; Nigel Stockwell (2007). Trusts and Equity (8th ed.). Pearson Longman. ISBN 978-1-4058-4684-4.
- Hopkins, Bruce R. (2007). The law of tax-exempt organizations (9th ed.). John Wiley and Sons. ISBN 0-470-03760-1.
- Garton, Jonathan (2007). "Justifying the cy-pres doctrine". Trust Law International. 21 (3). Bloomsbury Professional Ltd: 134–149. ISSN 0962-2624.
