= Charities Act =

Charities Act may refer to acts of legislatures in various countries:

== Australia ==
- Charities Act 1978 in Victoria
- Hospitals and Charities Act 1922 in Victoria
- Charities Funds Act 1958 in Queensland
- Collections for Charities Act 2001 in Tasmania,

== Barbados ==
- Charities Act 1979

== Canada ==
- Charities Act R.S.P.E.I. 1988 in Prince Edward Island

== Ireland ==
- Charities Act 2009
- Charities Act 2020 in the United States
- Charities Act 2005 in New Zealand
- Charities Act 2024

== Singapore ==
- Charities Act

== United Kingdom ==
- Charities Act 1960 (8 & 9 Eliz. 2. c. 58)
- Charities Act 1992 (c. 41)
- Charities Act 1993 (c. 10)
- Charities Act 2006 (c. 50)
- Charities Act 2011 (c. 25)
- Charities Act 2022 (c. 6)
- Medical Charities Act 1851 (14 & 15 Vict. c. 68)
- Recreational Charities Act 1958 (6 & 7 Eliz. 2. c. 17)
