= Charitable trusts in English law =

Express trusts dedicated to charitable goals under English law

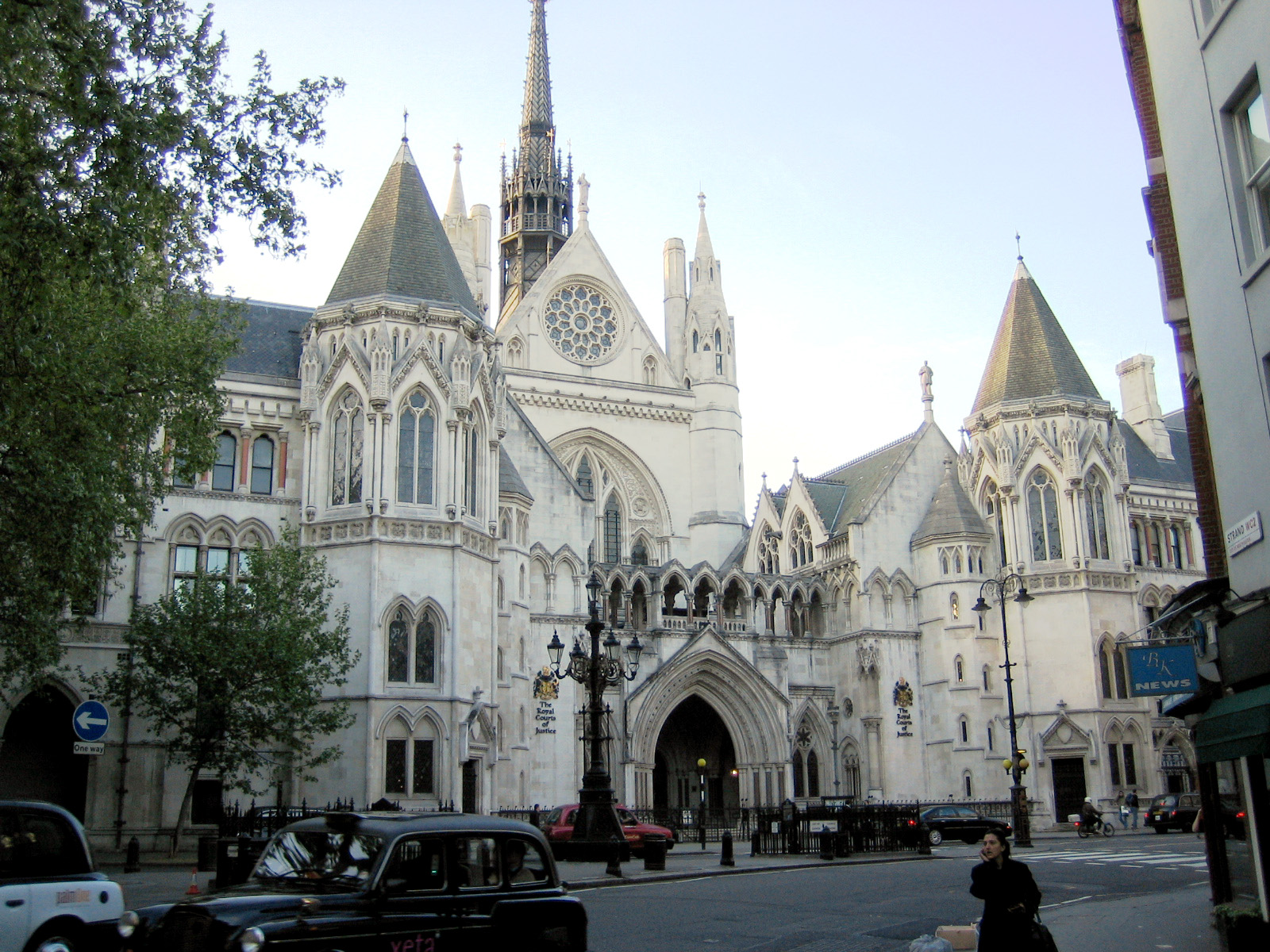
- The High Court of Justice, along with the Charity Commission, has jurisdiction over disputes in charitable trusts.
- Type: Legal concept
- Legal status: Active
- Purpose: Express trust dedicated to charitable goals in English law
- Region served: England and Wales
- Official language: English

Charitable trusts in English law are a form of express trust dedicated to charitable goals. There are various advantages to charitable trust status, including exemption from most forms of tax and freedom for the trustees not found in other types of English trusts. To be a valid charitable trust, the organization must demonstrate both a charitable purpose and a public benefit. Applicable charitable purposes are normally divided into categories for public benefit, including the relief of poverty, the promotion of education, the advancement of health and saving of lives, the promotion of religion, and all other types of trusts recognized by the law. There is also a requirement that the trust's purposes benefit the public (or some section of the public), and not simply a group of private individuals.

Such trusts will be invalid in several circumstances; charitable trusts are not allowed to be run for profit, nor can they have purposes that are not charitable (unless these are ancillary to the charitable purpose). Additionally, it is considered unacceptable for charitable trusts to campaign for political or legal change, although discussing political issues in a neutral manner is acceptable. Charitable trusts, like other trusts, are administered by trustees, but there is no direct relationship between the trustees and the beneficiaries. This results in two things: firstly, the trustees of a charitable trust have more freedom to act than other trustees, and secondly, beneficiaries cannot bring a court case against the trustees. Instead, the beneficiaries are represented by the Attorney General for England and Wales as parens patriae, who appears on behalf of The Crown.

Jurisdiction over charitable disputes is shared equally between the High Court of Justice and the Charity Commission. The Commission, as the first point of contact, is tasked with regulating and promoting charitable trusts, as well as providing advice and opinions to trustees on administrative matters. When the Commission feels that there has been mismanagement or maladministration, it can sanction the trustees, removing them, appointing new ones, or temporarily taking the trust property itself to prevent harm. In cases of flaws with a charity, the High Court can administer schemes directing the function of the charity, or even, under the Cy-près doctrine, change the purpose of the charity or gift entirely.

== Creation ==
Being a form of express trust, charitable trusts are subject to certain formalities during their creation. These requirements vary depending on whether the gift that establishes the trust is given during life, after death, or involves land. In the case of a gift given after death through a will, the will must adhere to Section 9 of the Wills Act 1837, which mandates the will to be in written form and signed by the testator (or someone else present, following the testator's instructions). It should be clear that the testator intended the will to be effective, and the signature must be executed or acknowledged by two or more witnesses. When all of these conditions are fulfilled, the will becomes a valid document, enabling the charitable trust to be formed. When the gift pertains to land and is made during the donor's lifetime, it must comply with Section 53(1)(b) of the Law of Property Act 1925, necessitating the agreement to be documented in writing and signed by the donor. In cases where the gift involves personal property and is made inter vivos, there are no formal prerequisites; it suffices for an oral declaration to establish the trust. Once properly constituted, a charitable trust, like all express trusts, becomes irrevocable unless the trust instrument explicitly allows for such revocation.

== Advantages of charity status ==
There are a variety of advantages to charity status. Within English trusts law, a standard express trust has a relationship between the trustees and the beneficiaries; this does not apply to charitable trusts, partially because of the special definition of trustee used and partially because there are no individual beneficiaries identified in a charitable trust. Instead, the Attorney General for England and Wales sues on behalf of beneficiaries to enforce a charitable trust. Because of this lack of a relationship, the trustees' powers are far wider-ranging, only being regulated by the Charity Commission and actions brought by the Attorney General; the beneficiaries have no direct control. Charitable trusts are also exempt from many formalities when being created, including the rule against perpetuities. The trustees are also not required to act unanimously, only with a majority.

Tax law also makes special exemptions for charitable trusts. They are free from the income tax paid by individuals and companies, and also the corporation tax paid by incorporated and unincorporated associations. There is no requirement for charitable trusts to pay capital gains tax or council tax, although they are obliged to pay VAT. This freedom from tax liability applies not just to charitable trusts, but also to people who donate to them. Individuals who donate via Gift Aid are free from paying tax on that amount, while companies who give gifts to charity can claim tax on the amount back from HM Revenue & Customs.

== Definitions ==
The definitions of a trustee and a trust within charitable trusts differ significantly from the norm. In particular, according to the Charities Act 1993 (section 37):

'charity trustees' means the person having the general control and management of the charity...
'trusts' in relation to a charity means the provisions establishing it as a charity and regulating its purposes and administration, whether those provisions take effect as a trust or not, and in relation to other institutions has a corresponding meaning.

There is no statutory definition of what a charity is; it is instead dealt with in a roundabout way. The Charities Act 2006 states in section 1(1) that:

For the purposes of the law of England and Wales, 'charity' means an institution which
(a) is established for charitable purposes only, and
(b) falls to be subject to the control of the High Court in the exercise of its jurisdiction with respect to charities.

== Charitable purpose ==
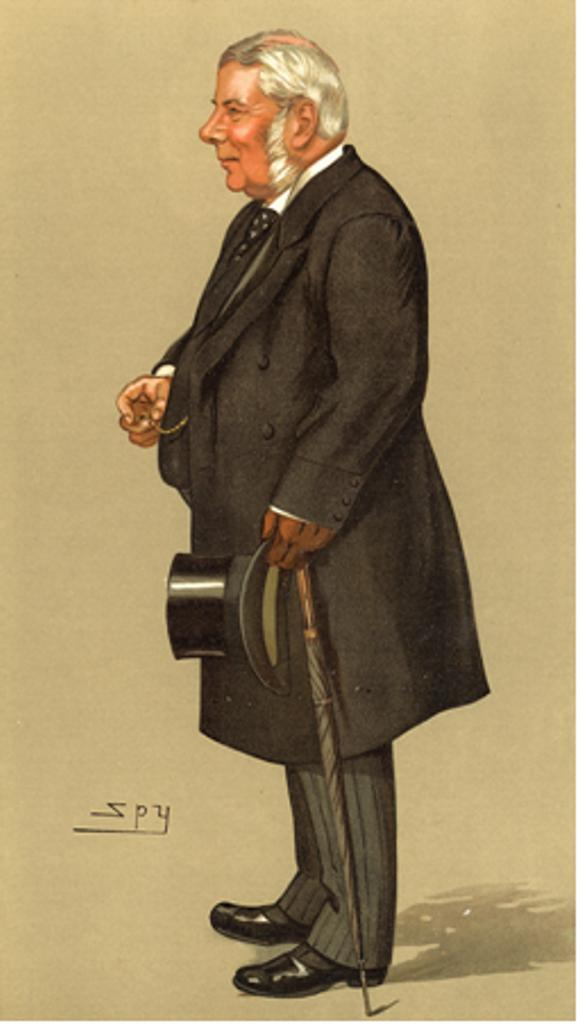
Lord Macnaghten, who set out the standard categorisation of charitable trusts in IRC v Pemsel.

The first definition of a "charitable purpose" was found in the preamble to the Charitable Uses Act 1601. The standard categorisation (since all previous attempts to put it on the statute books were "unduly cumbersome") was set out by Lord Macnaghten in IRC v Pemsel, where he said that "Charity in its legal sense comprises four principal divisions: Trusts for the relief of poverty; trusts for the advancement of education; trusts for the advancement of religion; and trusts for other purposes beneficial to the community". This "charitable purpose" was expanded on in Section 2(2) of the Charities Act 2006, but the Macnaghten categories are still widely used.

Trusts must also be for "public benefit", which was considered at length in Oppenheim v Tobacco Securities Trust. A fund was created to benefit children of employees and former employees of British American Tobacco, which was a large number; the total number of employees was over 110,000. The House of Lords found that size was not the issue; the group did not count as a section of the public because of the "personal nexus", or common relationship, between the settlors (British American Tobacco) and the beneficiaries. The nature of charitable trusts means that the definition of "public benefit" varies between Macnaghten's four categories.

=== Poverty ===
The 1601 Act stated that charities for the benefit of the "aged, impotent and poor people" had an appropriate purpose; it is accepted that these may appear individually. A charity does not have to be for the benefit of people who are both poor, impotent and aged to be valid, only one of them. "Poverty" is a subjective term, and in Re Coulthurst, Sir Raymond Evershed indicated that it should be treated as such; "poverty, of course, does not mean destitution ... it [means] persons who have to 'go short' ... due regard being had to their status in life and so forth". This appears to indicate that a millionaire who loses half of his income may be considered "poor", in that he is unable to have the lifestyle he is accustomed to. Some limits were set to this provision by Lord Simonds in IRC v Baddeley, where he wrote that:

There may be a good charity for the relief of persons who are not in grinding need or utter destitution ... but relief connotes need of some sort, either need for a home, or for the means to provide for some necessity or quasi-necessity, and not merely for an amusement, however healthy.

The gift that creates the charitable trust, whatever the definition of poverty accepted by the courts, must be for the poor and nobody else. In Re Gwyon, money was left to provide short trousers to children in Farnham. While this was a necessity under the standard definition of poverty, the gift was not limited to the poor, and instead went to every child in the area. As a result, the trust failed.

The "poverty" category is a "major exception" to the rule on personal relationships laid down in Oppenheim v Tobacco Securities Trust. In Dingle v Turner, a charitable trust was established to help poor employees of Dingle & Co. While the beneficiaries were all linked by a personal relationship (their employer), the courts ruled that poverty is an exception to the Oppenheim rule. Academics Richard Edwards and Nigel Stockwell argue that this is because allowing such trusts to exist relieves the rest of society for having to provide for poor people; as a result, there is "public benefit" in a wider way. The general public benefit rule in the "poverty" category is that "gifts for the relief of poverty among poor people of a particular description" is charitable; "gifts to particular persons, the relief of poverty being the motive of the gift" are not.

=== Education ===
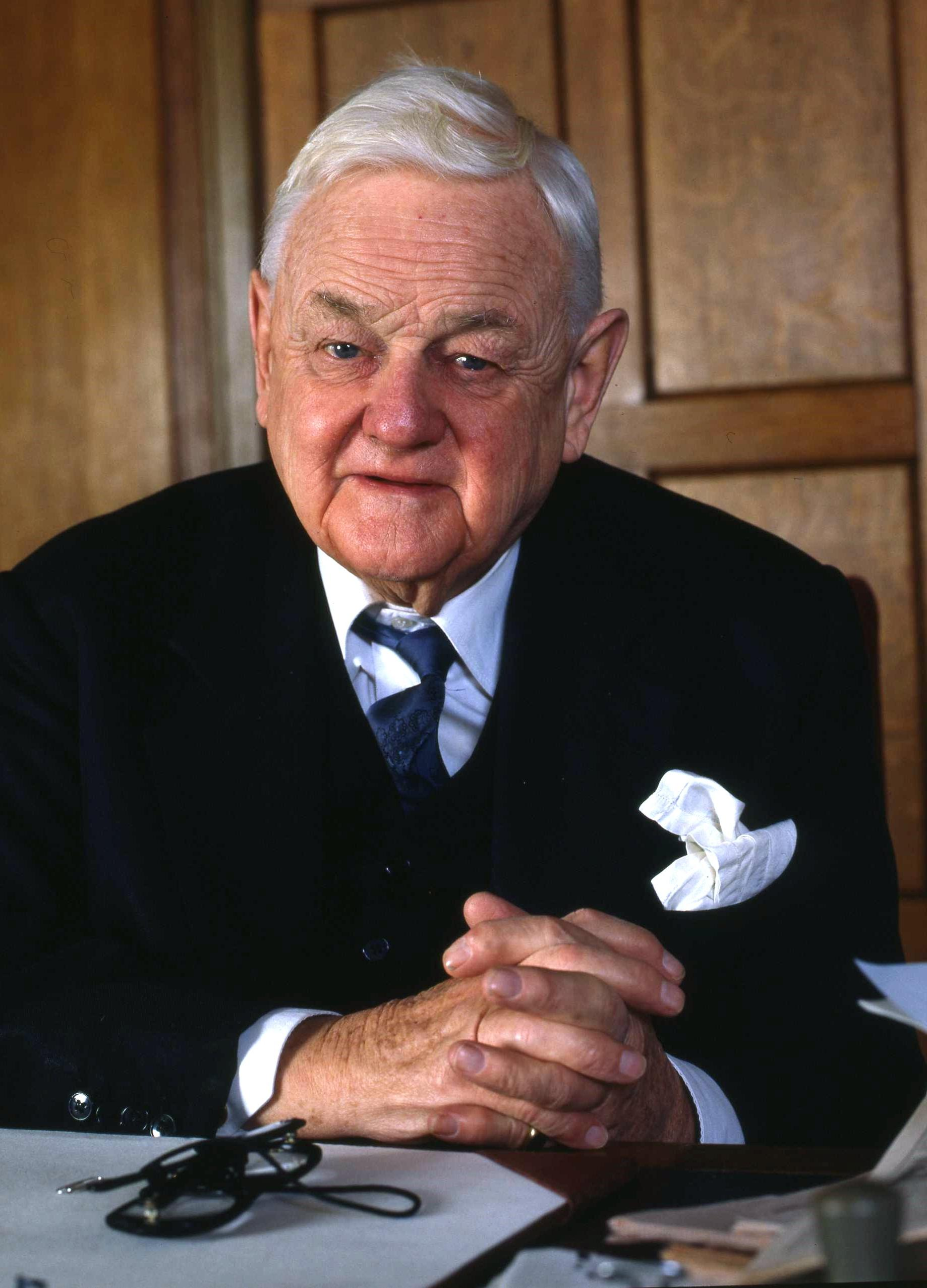
Lord Hailsham, who set out the extent of "education" of the young used in charitable trust cases in IRC v McMullen.

As with poverty, this category is also found in the 1601 Act's preamble, which refers to charities established for the "Maintenance of ... Schools of Learning, Free Schools, and Scholars at Universities". The common law, over the years, has recognised a wide area covered by "education". This includes the education of the young, a particularly wide category, described by Lord Hailsham in IRC v McMullen, as "a balanced and systematic process of instruction, training and practice containing both spiritual, moral, mental and physical elements". Although wide, this excludes things that the courts feel are harmful; in Re Shaw, Harman J excluded schools for pickpockets or prostitutes. "Education" also includes research, as long as the subject is useful and the gift makes some requirement that the information be made available to others and disseminated. In Re Hopkins, a gift was given to the Francis Bacon society to find proof that William Shakespeare's plays were written by Bacon. Wilberforce J held that it was a valid gift, as "the discovery would be of the highest value to history and to literature". He also gave the definition of research required for a gift to be valid:

The word education must be used in a wide sense, certainly extending beyond teaching, and the requirement is that, in order to be charitable, research must either be of educational value to the researcher or must be so directed as to lead to something which will pass into the store of educational material, or so as to improve the sum of communicable knowledge in an area which education must cover – education in this last context extending to the formation of literary taste and appreciation.

This definition was expanded on by Slade J in McGovern v Attorney General, where he said that:

(1) A trust for research will ordinarily qualify as a charitable trust if, but only if (a) the subject matter of the proposed research is a useful object of study; and (b) if it is contemplated that the knowledge acquired as a result of the research will be disseminated to others; and (c) the trust is for the benefit of the public, or a sufficiently important section of the public.

(2) In the absence of such a contrary context, however, the court will be readily inclined to construe a trust for research as importing subsequent dissemination of the results thereof. Furthermore, if a trust for research is to constitute a valid trust for the advancement of education, it is no necessary either (a) that the teacher/pupil relationship should be in contemplation, or (b) that the persons to benefit from the knowledge to be acquired should be persons who are already in the course of receiving an education in the conventional sense.

For artistic pursuits, it is not enough to promote such things generally, as it is too vague. A body for specific artistic purposes may be charitable, as in Royal Choral Society v IRC, as is the promotion of a particular composer, seen in Re Delius. For a gift to be charitable, the courts must be convinced that the subject of advancement be of artistic merit. This includes famous composers, as seen above, and social graces, as in Re Shaw's Wills Trust. When there is doubt, the courts ignore the opinions of the beneficiary and instead rely on experts, as in Re Pinion. This area is covered by the Charities Act 2006, which lists "the advancement of citizenship or community development" and "the advancement of the arts, culture, heritage or science" as valid types of charitable trust.

=== Religion ===
For the purposes of this category, "religion" was seen to mean a faith in a higher power, and does not include ethical principles or rationalism, as in Bowman v Secular Society. The 2006 Act expanded this, noting that religion "includes .. a religion which does not involve belief in a god". This extends to the support of religious buildings and sick or old members of the clergy, as in Re Forster. This category also covers groups with small followings, as in Re Watson, and with doubtful theology, as in Thornton v Howe. Curiously, and individually to religious charities, the public benefit requirement is justified by the assumption that, according to Cross J in Neville Estates v Madden, "some benefit accrues to the public from attendance at places of worship of persons who live in this world and mix with their fellow citizens". Notably, this excludes gifts to groups which do not associate with the public, as in Gilmour v Coats.

=== Other purposes ===
Macnaghten's fourth category contains not only individual categories of its own, but also general principles that are applied when a body seeks to be recognised as a charitable trust. The first of these "sub-categories" contains trusts for the benefit of the sick and old; the Preamble to the 1601 Act gave "aged, impotent and poor people" as acceptable beneficiaries for a charity. These acceptable beneficiaries are to be read individually; there is no requirement to aid the aged and impotent as well as the poor, and one can even exclude the poor, such as in Re Resch's Will Trusts, which dealt with a hospital that charged fees. The second sub-category is for charitable trusts relating to animals. As with religious charities, the benefit is derived not from the comfort afforded to the animals, but from the "indirect moral benefit to mankind". Again, this excludes trusts which isolate the beneficiaries from the public, as in Re Grove-Grady, where the trust sought to provide "a refuge [for animals] ... so that they shall be safe from molestation and destruction by man". Charities for the purpose of creating animal sanctuaries usually pass the public benefit test despite this, because they do not completely exclude the public and often have educational value.

The third sub-category covers charitable trusts for the benefit of localities. A trust for the benefit of a locality has long been held only to apply to that area; if its purpose within that area is charitable, it is valid. If the money is to be spent on non-charitable purposes, the trust fails, regardless of the fact that it applies to a particular area. This class of charities can be held valid even when it only impacts on a class within a locality, as in Goodman v Saltash Corporation. This can apply even when the class "fluctuates", such as in Re Christchurch Inclosure Act, where a gift was for the benefit of the inhabitants of a group of cottages, whoever those inhabitants might be.

Charitable trusts have historically been invalid if they include "purely recreational pastimes", as in IRC v City of Glasgow Police Athletic Association; even though the purpose of the charity was to improve the efficiency of the police force, the fact that this included a recreational element invalidated the trust. In response to this case and IRC v Baddely, the Recreational Charities Act 1958 was passed, which provides that "it shall be and be deemed always to have been charitable to provide, or assist in the provision of, facilities for recreation or other leisure-time occupation, if the facilities are provided in the interest of social welfare". Section 1(1) of the Act, however, preserves the need to provide a "public benefit". The Act also lays out what kinds of activities are in the "interest of social welfare", stating in Section 1(2) that it is where the facilities "are provided with the object of improving the conditions of life for the persons for whom the facilities are primarily provided" and in Section 1(2)(a) "those persons have need of such facilities as aforesaid by reason of their youth, age, infirmity or disablement, poverty or social and economic circumstances", or where, in Section 1(2)(b) "the facilities are available to members ... of the public at large".

This definition and the acceptance of the need for a "public benefit" allows the courts to reject charitable trusts for recreational activities, such as if they felt that the activities are harmful. The Act also excludes private clubs, unless the members fall under Section 1(2)(a). The courts are willing to accept charitable trusts for recreational activities if they benefit people as a whole, and not just the people covered by Section 1(2)(a), as in Guild v IRC, where Lord Keith stated "the fact is that persons from all walks of life and all kinds of social circumstances may have their conditions of life improved by the provision of recreational facilities of a suitable nature".

== Invalid purposes ==
=== Political activism ===
Charitable trusts can't be used to promote political changes, and charities attempting such have been "consistently rebuffed" by the courts. There are two justifications for this. The first is that, even when a campaign for political change is stated to be for the benefit of the community, it is not within the court's competence to decide whether or not the change would be beneficial. The second, laid out in National Anti-Vivisection Society v IRC, is that the courts must assume the law to be correct, and as such could not support any charity which is trying to alter that law. Academic Alastair Hudson describes this argument as "a little thin. Given that judges contentedly take it upon themselves to interpret, limit and extend statutes (as well as occasionally recommending the creation of new statutes to shore up the common law), it is peculiar to see judges so coy in the face of an argument being advanced that legislation might be changed".

The leading case, Anti-Vivisection Society, sets out a strict rule that charities cannot campaign politically. An illustration of its strictness is Bowman v Secular Society, where it was held that even when attempted changes to the law were ancillary to the main goals, it was still unacceptable. There is a dividing line; charitable trusts discussing political issues can be valid, as discussed by Hoffmann J obiter dicta in Attorney General v Ross. This line is considered by the Charity Commission in their official guidelines, which allow the Commission to look at the wider purpose of the organisation when deciding if it constitutes a valid charity.

=== Profit-making ===
No organisation run for profit can be a charity; a fee-paying school may be a charitable body despite the fees paid, but not if they are directly run to make a profit, as in Re Girls' Public Day School Trust. This also excludes benefit societies where the benefits are limited to those who have funded it, as in Re Holborn Air Raid Distress Fund.

=== Exclusivity ===
A charitable trust created from a gift must be exclusively charitable; if there are any purposes which would not be charitable on their own, the trust fails. Trust instruments should ideally identify that the money is to be used for "charitable purposes". The use of other words such as "beneficial" or "benevolent" causes the trust to fail at creation, as the words are not synonymous with charity. An example is the Privy Council decision in Attorney General of the Cayman Islands v Wahr-Hansen, where the Council held that gifts to "organisations or institutions operating for the public good" and acting "for the good or for the benefit of mankind" failed, because the definition given was not exclusively charitable.

There are two exceptions to the rule of exclusivity; ancillary purposes, and severance. Where the non-charitable purpose is a necessary ancillary to the charitable one, the trust will not fail. This is a matter of degrees, and was discussed by Slade J in McGovern v Attorney General, when he said that:

The distinction is between (a) those non-charitable activities authorised by the trust instrument which are merely incidental or subsidiary to a charitable purpose and (b) those non-charitable activities so authorised which themselves form part of the trust purpose. In the latter but not the former case the reference to non-charitable activities will deprive the trust of its charitable status.

Severance refers to the separation of charitable and non-charitable purposes, dividing the funds between them. This allows the charitable element to take effect. This is only possible when the trust instrument indicates that the donor intended for the fund to be divided, and cannot work where the donor gives a list of purposes a single fund is to be used for. The standard rule for dividing the funds is based on the equitable rule that "equity is equality"; money should be divided equally. There are exceptions where it is not practicable, as in Re Coxon, where of a £200,000 gift to the City of London for charitable purposes, a £100 dinner and other small gifts to the board of trustees was funded.

== Administration of charitable trusts ==
The administration of charitable trusts is covered primarily by the Charities Act 1993 and the Charities Act 2006, and is widely divided between four groups; the Attorney General for England and Wales, the trustees, the Charity Commission and the Official Custodian for Charities.

=== Attorney General and trustees ===
As mentioned, the Attorney General represents the beneficiaries as a parens patriae, appearing on the part of The Crown. Any case involving charities has him joined as a party, he may act against trustees in disputes, and take actions to recover property from third parties. His role was discussed in Brooks v Richardson, where the court quoted the practitioner's text Tudor on Charity:

By reason of his duty as the Sovereign's representative protecting all the persons interested in the charity funds, the Attorney-General is as a general rule a necessary party to charity proceeding. He represents the beneficial interest; it follows that in all proceedings in which the beneficial interest has to be before the court, he must be a party. He represents all the objects of the charity, who are in effect parties through him.

The next significant role is played by the charity trustees, defined in Section 97 of the 1993 Act as those persons having the general control and management of the administration of charities. As mentioned, charitable trustees have significantly more freedom to act than normal trustees, but the 1993 Act has put restrictions on who may be a charitable trustee. Section 72 excludes people convicted of a crime involving dishonesty, bankrupts, people previously removed from charity trusteeship, and people struck off as directors of companies. Those trustees appointed have many duties when administering the trust, including informing the Commission of changes to the charity or its dissolution, registering the charity and keeping proper accounts and records, to be submitted annually to the Commission.

=== Charity Commission ===
The Charity Commission originated as the Charity Commissioners, created by the Charitable Trusts Act 1853 to provide advice to charitable trusts. Currently governed by and exercising its functions under the Charities Act 2011, it has five core objectives:

1. to increase public trust and confidence in charities;
2. to promote the understanding of the public benefit requirement;
3. to increase the compliance of trustees with their legal obligations;
4. to promote the effective use of charitable resources;
5. to make charities more accountable to the donors, beneficiaries and the public.

Along with these objectives, it has six functions under the 2011 Act:

1. Determining whether institutions are or are not charities.
2. Encouraging and facilitating the better administration of charities.
3. Identifying, investigating and taking appropriate action with regard to apparent misconduct or mismanagement.
4. Issuing public collection certificates in respect of public charity collections.
5. Providing information relating to its functions or objectives including maintenance of an up-to-date register.
6. Giving information or advice to any Minister of the Crown with regard to the Commission's functions or meeting of its objectives.

The Charity Commission has the power to issue an inquiry into a charity under Section 46 of the 2011 act and, if they are satisfied there has been mismanagement, they are allowed to suspend trustees or officers, appoint additional trustees, vest charity property in the Official Custodian for Charities or order debtors or people holding charity property not to transfer it without their permission. They can also remove trustees on the grounds of bankruptcy, mental incapacity, failure to act or the trustee's absence from the country. The Commission is also authorised to appoint new trustees to replace removed ones, or even to increase the number of trustees.

The jurisdiction of the Charity Commission is concurrent with that of the High Court of Justice. The High Court possesses all the powers of the Commission, who only exercise theirs on application of the charity or Attorney General, or trustees, beneficiaries and interested people when the charity has an income of less than £500. The Commission, under Section 29 of the 2011 Act, also keeps the register of charities. Under Section 110 of the Act, the Commission is tasked with giving advice or opinions to trustees relating to the performance or administration of their charity. The Commission also acts as the Official Custodian for Charities, who acts as a trustee for charities at the direction of the Commission.

=== Schemes ===
Both the High Court and the Charities Commission are authorised to establish schemes administering charities. These can come about when money has been left for a charitable purpose which is not specified, or with no suggestion as to how it should be administered. The scheme may be used to appoint new trustees, except when the trustee's identity is crucial to the intentions of the testator, as in Re Lysaght. Schemes may also be used to fix administrative difficulties caused by uncertainty, as in Re Gott, or even to completely defeat the gift. Schemes can also be used, on the application of trustees, to extend powers of investment or consolidate funds. The trustees may apply to change the core purpose of the trust, which while enacted through a scheme, follows the doctrine of Cy-près.

=== Cy-pres doctrine ===
The doctrine of cy-pres is a form of variation of trusts; it allows the original purpose of the trust to be altered. The doctrine originated in ecclesiastical law, the name coming as a contraction of the Norman French cy pres comme possible (as close as possible), and is typically used where the original purpose of the charity has failed, and results in the trust purpose being altered to the nearest realistic alternative. Prior to the Charities Act 1960 (8 & 9 Eliz. 2. c. 58), this "failed purpose" situation was the only time when cy-pres could be applied; it required the original purpose to be impossible or impractical. With the 1960 Act (the relevant provisions of which are now included in the 1993 Act), cy-pres can be applied where the original purposes have:

- (a) been as far as may be fulfilled; or cannot be carried out, or not according to the directions given and to the spirit of the gift;
- (b) or where the original purposes provide a use for part only of the property available by virtue of the gift;
- (c) where the property available by virtue of the gift and other property applicable for similar purposes can be more effectively used in conjunction, and to that end can suitably, regard being had to the spirit of the gift, be made applicable to common purposes;
- (d) or where the original purposes were laid down by reference to an area which then was but has ceased to be a unit for some other purpose, or by reference to a class of persons or to an area which has for any reason since ceased to be suitable, regard being had to the spirit of the gift, or to be practical in administering the gift;
- (e) or where the original purposes, in whole or in part, have since they were laid down been adequately provided for by other means; or ceased, as being useless or harmful to the community or for other reasons, to be in law charitable; or ceased in any other way to provide a suitable and effective method of using the property available by virtue of the gift, regarding being had to the spirit of the gift.

This definition was amended by the Charities Act 2006 to replace "the spirit of the gift" with "the appropriate considerations", which are defined as "(on the one hand) the spirit of the gift concerned, and (on the other) the social and economic circumstances prevailing at the time of the proposed alteration of the original purposes".

Failures that lead to an application for cy-pres are of two sorts; subsequent failure, where the trust, constituted properly, failed after a period of action, and initial failure, where the trust fails at creation. Subsequent failure cases are designed to have the charity's funds applied to more effective purposes, and as such money already donated to the charity cannot be returned to the next of kin of the original money; in Re Wright, it was said that "once money has been effectually dedicated to charity the testator's next of kin or residuary legatees are for ever excluded". Schemes for initial failure, on the other hand, ask the court to decide whether the gifts should be returned to the testator's estate and next of kin or be applied to a new purpose under cy-pres. When deciding if a gift has failed, there is a distinction made between gifts to unincorporated bodies and incorporated bodies, as laid down in Re Vernon's Will Trust. This is because gifts to an unincorporated body must be treated as gifts to that body's purpose, not to the body itself, since unincorporated bodies cannot hold property. As such, the gift does not revert to the next of kin because even if the body is dissolved, the gift's purpose is (presumably) still valid.

== Bibliography ==
- Dollimore, Jean (2007). "The Charities Act 2006: Part 1". Private Client Business. 2007 (2). Sweet & Maxwell. ISSN 0967-229X.
- Edwards, Richard; Nigel Stockwell (2007). Trusts and Equity (8th ed.). Pearson Longman. ISBN 978-1-4058-4684-4.
- Hopkins, Bruce R. (2007). The law of tax-exempt organizations (9th ed.). John Wiley and Sons. ISBN 0-470-03760-1.
- Hudson, Alastair (2009). Equity and Trusts (6th ed.). Routledge-Cavendish. ISBN 0-415-49771-X.
