= List of acts of the Parliament of the United Kingdom from 2013 =

This is a list of acts of the Parliament of the United Kingdom passed in 2013.

Acts passed since 1963 are cited by calendar year, as opposed to the convention used for earlier acts of citing the regnal year(s) in which the relevant parliamentary session was held. Each act passed in a respective year is given a chapter number (abbreviated "c."), denoted by Arabic numerals in the case of public general acts, lowercase Roman numerals in the case of local acts, or italicised Arabic numerals in the case of personal acts. These run as separate series.

40 acts of Parliament were passed in 2013: 33 public general acts and 7 local acts.

indicates that an act has been transcribed on Wikisource, indicates that an act is available to view at legislation.gov.uk, and indicates the location of the original act in the Parliamentary Archives.

== Public general acts ==
Short title	Citation	Royal assent
Long title
Trusts (Capital and Income) Act 2013	2013 c. 1	31 January 2013
An Act to amend the law relating to capital and income in trusts.
Statute Law (Repeals) Act 2013	2013 c. 2	31 January 2013
An Act to promote the reform of the statute law by the repeal, in accordance with recommendations of the Law Commission and the Scottish Law Commission, of certain enactments which (except in so far as their effect is preserved) are no longer of practical utility.
Prevention of Social Housing Fraud Act 2013	2013 c. 3	31 January 2013
An Act to create offences and make other provision relating to sub-letting and parting with possession of social housing; to make provision about the investigation of social housing fraud; and for connected purposes.
Disabled Persons' Parking Badges Act 2013	2013 c. 4	31 January 2013
An Act to amend section 21 of the Chronically Sick and Disabled Persons Act 1970, (Note: Chronically Sick and Disabled Persons Act 1970 (c. 44)) and for connected purposes.
European Union (Croatian Accession and Irish Protocol) Act 2013	2013 c. 5	31 January 2013
An Act to make provision consequential on the treaty concerning the accession of the Republic of Croatia to the European Union, signed at Brussels on 9 December 2011, and provision consequential on the Protocol on the concerns of the Irish people on the Treaty of Lisbon, adopted at Brussels on 16 May 2012; and to make provision about the entitlement of nationals of the Republic of Croatia to enter or reside in the United Kingdom as workers.
Electoral Registration and Administration Act 2013	2013 c. 6	31 January 2013
An Act to make provision about the registration of electors and the administration and conduct of elections; and to amend section 3(2)(a) of the Parliamentary Constituencies Act 1986. (Note: Parliamentary Constituencies Act 1986 (c. 56))
HGV Road User Levy Act 2013	2013 c. 7	28 February 2013
An Act to make provision charging a levy in respect of the use or keeping of heavy goods vehicles on public roads in the United Kingdom, and for connected purposes.
Mental Health (Discrimination) Act 2013	2013 c. 8	28 February 2013
An Act to make further provision about discrimination against people on the grounds of their mental health.
European Union (Approvals) Act 2013 (repealed)	2013 c. 9	28 February 2013
An Act to make provision approving for the purposes of section 8 of the European Union Act 2011 (Note: European Union Act 2011 (c. 12)) certain draft decisions under Article 352 of the Treaty on the Functioning of the European Union; and to make provision approving for the purposes of section 7(3) of that Act a draft decision under Article 17(5) of the Treaty on European Union about the number of members of the European Commission. (Repealed by European Union (Withdrawal) Act 2018 (c. 16))
Scrap Metal Dealers Act 2013	2013 c. 10	28 February 2013
An Act to amend the law relating to scrap metal dealers; and for connected purposes.
Prisons (Property) Act 2013	2013 c. 11	28 February 2013
An Act to make provision for the destruction of certain property found in prisons and similar institutions.
Supply and Appropriation (Anticipation and Adjustments) Act 2013	2013 c. 12	26 March 2013
An Act to authorise the use of resources for the years ending with 31 March 2010, 31 March 2011, 31 March 2012, 31 March 2013 and 31 March 2014; to authorise the issue of sums out of the Consolidated Fund for the years ending with 31 March 2013 and 31 March 2014; and to appropriate the supply authorised by this Act for the years ending with 31 March 2010, 31 March 2011, 31 March 2012 and 31 March 2013.
Presumption of Death Act 2013	2013 c. 13	26 March 2013
An Act to make provision in relation to the presumed death of missing persons; and for connected purposes.
Mobile Homes Act 2013	2013 c. 14	26 March 2013
An Act to amend the law relating to mobile homes.
Antarctic Act 2013	2013 c. 15	26 March 2013
An Act to make provision consequential on Annex VI to the Protocol on Environmental Protection to the Antarctic Treaty; to amend the Antarctic Act 1994; (Note: Antarctic Act 1994 (c. 15)) and for connected purposes.
Welfare Benefits Up-rating Act 2013	2013 c. 16	26 March 2013
An Act to make provision relating to the up-rating of certain social security benefits and tax credits.
Jobseekers (Back to Work Schemes) Act 2013	2013 c. 17	26 March 2013
An Act to make provision about the effect of certain provisions relating to participation in a scheme designed to assist persons to obtain employment and about notices relating to participation in such a scheme.
Justice and Security Act 2013	2013 c. 18	25 April 2013
An Act to provide for oversight of the Security Service, the Secret Intelligence Service, the Government Communications Headquarters and other activities relating to intelligence or security matters; to make provision about closed material procedure in relation to certain civil proceedings; to prevent the making of certain court orders for the disclosure of sensitive information; and for connected purposes.
Groceries Code Adjudicator Act 2013	2013 c. 19	25 April 2013
An Act to set up a Groceries Code Adjudicator with the role of enforcing the Groceries Code and encouraging compliance with it.
Succession to the Crown Act 2013	2013 c. 20	25 April 2013
An Act to make succession to the Crown not depend on gender; to make provision about Royal Marriages; and for connected purposes.
Partnerships (Prosecution) (Scotland) Act 2013	2013 c. 21	25 April 2013
An Act to make provision about the prosecution in Scotland of partnerships, partners and others following dissolution or changes in membership.
Crime and Courts Act 2013	2013 c. 22	25 April 2013
An Act to establish, and make provision about, the National Crime Agency; to abolish the Serious Organised Crime Agency and the National Policing Improvement Agency; to make provision about the judiciary and the structure, administration, proceedings and powers of courts and tribunals; to make provision about deferred prosecution agreements; to make provision about border control; to make provision about drugs and driving; and for connected purposes.
Marine Navigation Act 2013	2013 c. 23	25 April 2013
An Act to make provision in relation to marine navigation and harbours.
Enterprise and Regulatory Reform Act 2013	2013 c. 24	25 April 2013
An Act to make provision about the UK Green Investment Bank; to make provision about employment law; to establish and make provision about the Competition and Markets Authority and to abolish the Competition Commission and the Office of Fair Trading; to amend the Competition Act 1998 (Note: Competition Act 1998 (c. 41)) and the Enterprise Act 2002; (Note: Enterprise Act 2002 (c. 40)) to make provision for the reduction of legislative burdens; to make provision about copyright and rights in performances; to make provision about payments to company directors; to make provision about redress schemes relating to lettings agency work and property management work; to make provision about the supply of customer data; to make provision for the protection of essential supplies in cases of insolvency; to make provision about certain bodies established by Royal Charter; to amend section 9(5) of the Equality Act 2010; (Note: Equality Act 2010 (c. 15)) and for connected purposes.
Public Service Pensions Act 2013	2013 c. 25	25 April 2013
An Act to make provision for public service pension schemes; and for connected purposes.
Defamation Act 2013	2013 c. 26	25 April 2013
An Act to amend the law of defamation.
Growth and Infrastructure Act 2013	2013 c. 27	25 April 2013
An Act to make provision in connection with facilitating or controlling the following, namely, the provision or use of infrastructure, the carrying-out of development, and the compulsory acquisition of land; to make provision about when rating lists are to be compiled; to make provision about the rights of employees of companies who agree to be employee shareholders; and for connected purposes.
Supply and Appropriation (Main Estimates) Act 2013	2013 c. 28	17 July 2013
An Act to authorise the use of resources for the year ending with 31 March 2014; to authorise both the issue of sums out of the Consolidated Fund and the application of income for that year; and to appropriate the supply authorised for that year by this Act and by the Supply and Appropriation (Anticipation and Adjustments) Act 2013. (Note: Supply and Appropriation (Anticipation and Adjustments) Act 2013 (c. 12))
Finance Act 2013	2013 c. 29	17 July 2013
An Act to grant certain duties, to alter other duties, and to amend the law relating to the National Debt and the Public Revenue, and to make further provision in connection with finance.
Marriage (Same Sex Couples) Act 2013	2013 c. 30	17 July 2013
An Act to make provision for the marriage of same sex couples in England and Wales, about gender change by married persons and civil partners, about consular functions in relation to marriage, for the marriage of armed forces personnel overseas, for permitting marriages according to the usages of belief organisations to be solemnized on the authority of certificates of a superintendent registrar, for the review of civil partnership, for the review of survivor benefits under occupational pension schemes, and for connected purposes.
High Speed Rail (Preparation) Act 2013	2013 c. 31	21 November 2013
An Act to make provision authorising expenditure in preparation for a high speed railway transport network.
Energy Act 2013	2013 c. 32	18 December 2013
An Act to make provision for the setting of a decarbonisation target range and duties in relation to it; for or in connection with reforming the electricity market for purposes of encouraging low carbon electricity generation or ensuring security of supply; for the establishment and functions of the Office for Nuclear Regulation; about the government pipe-line and storage system and rights exercisable in relation to it; about the designation of a strategy and policy statement; about domestic supplies of gas and electricity; for extending categories of activities for which energy licences are required; for the making of orders requiring regulated persons to provide redress to consumers of gas or electricity; about offshore transmission of electricity during a commissioning period; for imposing fees in connection with certain costs incurred by the Secretary of State; about smoke and carbon monoxide alarms; and for connected purposes.
Financial Services (Banking Reform) Act 2013	2013 c. 33	18 December 2013
An Act to make further provision about banking and other financial services, including provision about the Financial Services Compensation Scheme; to make provision for the amounts owed in respect of certain deposits to be treated as a preferential debt on insolvency; to make further provision about payment systems and securities settlement systems; to make provision about the accounts of the Bank of England and its wholly owned subsidiaries; to make provision in relation to persons providing claims management services; and for connected purposes.

== Local acts ==
Short title	Citation	Royal assent
Long title
Canterbury City Council Act 2013	2013 c. i	28 February 2013
An Act to confer powers on Canterbury City Council for the better control of street trading in the city of Canterbury.
Leeds City Council Act 2013	2013 c. ii	28 February 2013
An Act to confer powers on Leeds City Council for the better control of street trading in the city of Leeds.
Nottingham City Council Act 2013	2013 c. iii	28 February 2013
An Act to (Note: The Queen's Printer edition erroneously begins with the words "An Act to to", but the Journals of the House of Commons confirm that the bill of the same name which was given royal assent on 28 February 2013 began with the words "A Bill to". The long title of the act must, therefore, correspond.) confer powers on Nottingham City Council for the better control of street trading in the city of Nottingham.
Reading Borough Council Act 2013	2013 c. iv	28 February 2013
An Act to confer powers on Reading Borough Council for the better control of street trading and touting in the borough of Reading.
London Local Authorities and Transport for London Act 2013	2013 c. v	18 December 2013
An Act to confer further powers upon local authorities in London and upon Transport for London; and for related purposes.
Humber Bridge Act 2013	2013 c. vi	18 December 2013
An Act to amend the constitution of the Humber Bridge Board and to confer new borrowing and other powers on it; to make new provision for the recovery of any deficit of the Board from local authorities in the area; to confer new powers for the setting and revision of tolls and to make other provision for and in connection with the operation of the bridge; and for connected purposes.
City of London (Various Powers) Act 2013	2013 c. vii	18 December 2013
An Act to amend the provision for the control of street trading in the City of London; to make provision relating to City walkways; and for related purposes.

== See also ==
- List of acts of the Parliament of the United Kingdom
