= Exempt charity =

An exempt charity is an institution established in England and Wales for charitable purposes which is exempt from registration with, and oversight by, the Charity Commission for England and Wales.

Exempt charities are largely institutions of further and higher education, universities, industrial and provident societies, friendly societies, or national museums, that were established by an act of Parliament or by a royal charter. These organisations are specified in schedule 3 to the Charities Act 2011.

Historically, they were treated as exempt from supervision because they were considered to be adequately supervised by, or accountable to, some other body or authority, such as Parliament. However this supervision was not always formalised, and the Charities Act 2006 (which was consolidated into the Charities Act 2011) introduced the idea of "principal regulator" for exempt charities. Where a previously exempt charity had no principal regulator it would become subject to registration with, and regulation by, the Charity Commission.

Although outside the jurisdiction of the Charity Commission, exempt charities are still subject to the usual legal rules applicable to charities in English law and to the general provisions of the Charities Acts, and may seek advice from the Charity Commission

== Named charities ==
The following list (comprising schedule 3 to the Charities Act 2011) lists institutions both by name and by generic type as exempt charities:

Institutions with an exemption from the Charitable Trusts Acts 1853 to 1939

1(1) Any institution which, if the Charities Act 1960 had not been passed, would be exempted from the powers and jurisdiction, under the Charitable Trusts Acts 1853 to 1939, of—

(a) the Charity Commissioners for England and Wales, or

(b) the Minister of Education,(apart from any power of the Commissioners or Minister to apply those Acts in whole or in part to charities otherwise exempt) by the terms of any enactment not contained in the Charitable Trusts Acts 1853 to 1939 other than section 9 of the Places of Worship Registration Act 1855.

(2) Sub-paragraph (1) does not include—

(a) any Investment Fund or Deposit Fund within the meaning of the Church Funds Investment Measure 1958,

(b) any investment fund or deposit fund within the meaning of the Methodist Church Funds Act 1960, or

(c) the representative body of the Welsh Church or property administered by it.

Educational institutions

2 The universities of Oxford, Cambridge, London, Durham, Newcastle and Manchester.

3 King’s College London and Queen Mary and Westfield College in the University of London.

4(1) Any of the following, if Her Majesty declares it by Order in Council to be an exempt charity for the purposes of this Act—

(a) a university in England,

(b) a university college in England, or

(c) an institution which is connected with a university in England or a university college in England.

(2) Sub-paragraph (1) does not include—

(a) any college in the university of Oxford;

(b) any college or hall in the university of Cambridge or Durham;

(c) any students’ union.

(3) For the purposes of this paragraph—

(a) a university or university college is in England if its activities are carried on, or principally carried on, in England;

(b) the Open University is to be treated as a university in England.

5(1) An English higher education corporation.

(2) For the purposes of this paragraph a higher education corporation is an English higher education corporation if the activities of the institution conducted by that corporation are carried on, or principally carried on, in England.

6(1) A successor company to a higher education corporation at a time when the institution conducted by the company is eligible, by virtue of an order made under section 129 of the 1988 Act, to receive support from funds administered by the Higher Education Funding Council for England.

(2) In this paragraph “the 1988 Act” means the Education Reform Act 1988 and “successor company to a higher education corporation” has the meaning given by section 129(5) of the 1988 Act.

7A further education corporation.

8A qualifying Academy proprietor (as defined in section 12(2) of the Academies Act 2010).

9 The governing body of any foundation, voluntary or foundation special school.

10 Any foundation body established under section 21 of the School Standards and Framework Act 1998.

11A sixth form college corporation (within the meaning of the Further and Higher Education Act 1992).

Museums, galleries etc.

12 The Board of Trustees of the Victoria and Albert Museum.

13 The Board of Trustees of the Science Museum.

14 The Board of Trustees of the Armouries.

15 The Board of Trustees of the Royal Botanic Gardens, Kew.

16 The Board of Trustees of the National Museums and Galleries on Merseyside.

17 The trustees of the British Museum.

18 The trustees of the Natural History Museum.

19 The Board of Trustees of the National Gallery.

20 The Board of Trustees of the Tate Gallery.

21 The Board of Trustees of the National Portrait Gallery.

22 The Board of Trustees of the Wallace Collection.

23 The Trustees of the Imperial War Museum.

24 The Trustees of the National Maritime Museum.

25 The British Library Board.

Housing

26 Any registered society within the meaning of the Co-operative and Community Benefit Societies and Credit Unions Act 1965, if the society is also a non-profit registered provider of social housing.

27 Any registered society within the meaning of the Co-operative and Community Benefit Societies and Credit Unions Act 1965, if the society is also registered in the register of social landlords under Part 1 of the Housing Act 1996.

Connected institutions

28(1) Any institution which—

(a) is administered by or on behalf of an institution included in any of paragraphs 1 to 8 and 11 to 25, and

(b) is established for the general purposes of, or for any special purpose of or in connection with, the institution mentioned in paragraph (a).

(2) Sub-paragraph (1) does not include—

(a) any college in the university of Oxford which is administered by or on behalf of that university;

(b) any college or hall in the university of Cambridge or Durham which is administered by or on behalf of that university;

(c) any student’s union.

(3) Any institution which—

(a) is administered by or on behalf of a body included in paragraph 9 or 10, and

(b) is established for the general purposes of, or for any special purpose of or in connection with, that body or any foundation, voluntary or foundation special school or schools.

== Formerly exempt charities ==
The following charities are no longer exempt, because there was no suitable body to act as principal regulator:

- Universities and other higher education institutions in Wales
- The colleges and halls of Cambridge, Durham and Oxford universities
- Students' unions
- Eton and Winchester colleges
- Museum of London
- Church Commissioners, and the Representative Body of the Church in Wales
