= List of Welsh statutory instruments, 2008 =

This is an incomplete list of Welsh statutory instruments made in 2008. Statutory instruments made by the Assembly are numbered in the main United Kingdom series with their own sub-series. The Welsh language has official equal status with the English language in Wales, so every statutory instrument made by the Assembly is officially published in both English and Welsh. Only the titles of the English-language version are reproduced here. The statutory instruments are secondary legislation, deriving their power from the acts of Parliament establishing and transferring functions and powers to the Welsh Assembly.

== 1-100 ==
- Planning and Compulsory Purchase Act 2004 (Commencement No. 4 and Consequential, Transitional and Savings Provisions) (Wales) (Amendment No. 1) Order 2008 W.4
- Childcare Act 2006 (Commencement No. 1) (Wales) Order 2008 W.6
- Non-Domestic Rating (Demand Notices) (Wales) (Amendment) Regulations 2008 W.7
- Plastic Materials and Articles in Contact with Food (Lid Gaskets) (Wales) Regulations 2008 W.11
- Street Works (Registers, Notices, Directions and Designations) (Wales) Regulations 2008 W.14
- Street Works (Fixed Penalty) (Wales) Regulations 2008 W.15
- Sheep and Goats (Records, Identification and Movement) (Wales) Order 2008 W.17
- Control of School Premises (Wales) Regulations 2008 W.18
- Condensed Milk and Dried Milk (Wales) (Amendment) Regulations 2008 W.19
- Miscellaneous Food Additives and the Sweeteners in Food (Amendment) (Wales) Regulations 2008 W.20
- Collaboration Between Maintained Schools (Wales) Regulations 2008 W.21
- Childcare Act 2006 (Local Authority Assessment) (Wales) Regulations 2008 W.22
- Childcare Act 2006 (Provision of Information) (Wales) Regulations 2008 W.23
- Fire and Rescue Authorities (Improvement Plans) (Wales) Order 2008 W.25
- Education (School Teachers' Qualifications) (Amendment) (Wales) Regulations 2008 W.26
- Local Government (Politically Restricted Posts) (Wales) Regulations 2008 W.27
- Road Traffic (Permitted Parking Area and Special Parking Area) (County Borough of Wrexham) Order 2008 W.28
- Agricultural Holdings (Units of Production) (Wales) Order 2008 W.29
- Rent Repayment Orders (Supplementary Provisions) (Wales) Regulations 2008 W.30
- Housing (Right to Buy) (Priority of Charges) (Wales) Order 2008 W.37
- Welsh Levy Board Order 2008 W.39
- Fire and Rescue Authorities (Best Value Performance Indicators) (Wales) Order 2008 W.40
- Street Works (Fixed Penalty) (Wales) (Amendment) Regulations 2008 W.41
- Local Authorities (Alteration of Requisite Calculations) (Wales) Regulations 2008 W.42
- Town and Country Planning (General Permitted Development) (Amendment) (Wales) Order 2008 W.43
- Local Government (Best Value Performance Indicators) (Wales) Order 2008 W.44
- Education (Assisted Places) (Amendment) (Wales) Regulations 2008 W.45
- Education (Assisted Places) (Incidental Expenses) (Amendment) (Wales) Regulations 2008 W.46
- Control of Salmonella in Poultry (Wales) Order 2008 W.50
- Street Works (Registers, Notices, Directions and Designations) (Wales) (No. 2) Regulations 2008 W.52
- Honey (Wales) (Amendment) Regulations 2008 W.53
- Control of School Premises (Wales) (Amendment) Regulations 2008 W.55
- National Health Service (Optical Charges and Payments) and (General Ophthalmic Services) (Amendment) (Wales) Regulations 2008 W.56
- Powys (Communities) Order 2008 W.58
- Local Authorities (Capital Finance and Accounting) (Wales) (Amendment) Regulations 2008 W.59
- Local Government and Public Involvement in Health Act 2007 (Commencement) (Wales) Order 2008 W.60
- Street Works (Inspection Fees) (Wales) (Amendment) Regulations 2008 W.62
- Removal and Disposal of Vehicles (Amendment) (Wales) Regulations 2008 W.64
- Civil Enforcement of Parking Contraventions (Guidelines on Levels of Charges) (Wales) Order 2008 W.65
- Civil Enforcement of Parking Contraventions (General Provisions) (Wales) Regulations 2008 W.66
- Civil Enforcement of Parking Contraventions (Representations and Appeals) Removed Vehicles (Wales) Regulations 2008 W.67
- Civil Enforcement Officers (Wearing of Uniforms) (Wales) Regulations 2008 W.68
- Civil Enforcement of Parking Contraventions (Approved Devices) (Wales) Order 2008 W.69
- National Health Service (Optical Charges and Payments) (Amendment) (Wales) Regulations 2008 W.70
- Dairy Produce Quotas (Wales) (Amendment) Regulations 2008 W.72
- Hywel Dda National Health Service Trust (Establishment) Order 2008 W.73
- Meat Products (Wales) (Amendment) Regulations 2008 W,74
- Abertawe Bro Morgannwg University National Health Service Trust (Establishment) Order 2008 W.75
- Cwm Taf National Health Service Trust (Establishment) Order 2008 W.76
- Rice Products from the United States of America (Restriction on First Placing on the Market) (Wales) Regulations 2008 W.80
- Local Authorities (Model Code of Conduct) (Wales) Order 2008 W.82
- Transport of Animals (Cleansing and Disinfection) (Wales) (No. 3) (Amendment) Order 2008 W.83
- North Glamorgan National Health Service Trust (Transfer of Staff, Property, Rights and Liabilities) Order 2008 W.87
- Pontypridd and Rhondda National Health Service Trust (Transfer of Staff, Property, Rights and Liabilities) Order 2008 W.88
- Swansea National Health Service Trust (Transfer of staff, Property, Rights and Liabilities) Order 2008 W.89
- Bro Morgannwg National Health Service Trust (Transfer of Staff, Property, Rights and Liabilities) Order 2008 W.90
- Carmarthenshire National Health Service Trust (Transfer of Staff, Property, Rights and Liabilities) Order 2008 W.91
- Pontypridd and Rhondda National Health Service Trust (Dissolution) Order 2008 W.92
- Carmarthenshire National Health Service Trust (Dissolution) Order 2008 W.93
- Ceredigion and Mid Wales National Health Service Trust (Dissolution) Order 2008 W.94
- Ceredigion and Mid Wales National Health Service Trust (Transfer of Staff, Property, Rights and Liabilities) Order 2008 W.95
- Pembrokeshire and Derwen National Health Service Trust (Transfer of Staff, Property, Rights and Liabilities) Order 2008 W.96
- Pembrokeshire and Derwen National Health Service Trust (Dissolution) Order 2008 W.97
- Swansea National Health Service Trust (Dissolution) Order 2008 W.98
- Bro Morgannwg National Health Service Trust (Dissolution) Order 2008 W.99
- North Glamorgan National Health Service Trust (Dissolution) Order 2008 W.100

== 101-200 ==
- Further Education and Training Act 2007 (Commencement No. 2) (Wales) Order 2008 W.108
- Bovine Semen (Wales) Regulations 2008 W.110
- Seed Potatoes (Wales) (Amendment) Regulations 2008 W.112
- Zootechnical Standards (Amendment) (Wales) Regulations 2008 W.113
- Specified Products from China (Restriction on First Placing on the Market) (Wales) Regulations 2008 W.114
- Heather and Grass etc. Burning (Wales) Regulations 2008 W.115
- Bluetongue (Wales) Regulations 2008 W.116
- Transmissible Spongiform Encephalopathies (Wales) (Amendment) Regulations 2008 W.119
- Street Works (Inspection Fees) (Wales) (Amendment) (No. 2) Regulations 2008 W.121
- Civil Enforcement of Parking Contraventions (General Provisions) (Wales) (No. 2) Regulations 2008 W.122
- Civil Enforcement of Parking Contraventions (Approved Devices) (Wales) (No. 2) Order 2008 W.123
- Plastic Materials and Articles in Contact with Food (Wales) Regulations 2008 W.124
- Education (Fees and Awards) (Wales) Regulations 2008 W.126
- Food Labelling (Declaration of Allergens) (Wales) Regulations 2008 W.128
- Specified Animal Pathogens (Wales) Order 2008 W.129
- Assembly Learning Grants and Loans (Higher Education) (Wales) Regulations 2008 W.130
- Products of Animal Origin (Disease Control) (Wales) Regulations 2008 W.132
- Regional Transport Planning (Wales) (Amendment) Order 2008 W.135
- Disease Control (Wales) (Amendment) Order 2008 W.136
- Assembly Learning Grants (European Institutions) (Wales) (Amendment) Regulations 2008 W.137
- National Health Service (General Medical Services Contracts) (Wales) (Amendment) Regulations 2008 W.138
- Abortion (Amendment) (Wales) Regulations 2008 W.140
- Spreadable Fats (Marketing Standards) and the Milk and Milk Products (Protection of Designations) (Wales) Regulations 2008 W.141
- Education (National Curriculum) (Modern Foreign Languages) (Wales) Order 2008 W.145
- Education (National Curriculum) (Attainment Targets and Programmes of Study) (Wales) Order 2008 W.146
- National Health Service (Primary Medical Services) and (Performers Lists) (Miscellaneous Amendments) (Wales) Regulations 2008 W.148
- Education and Inspections Act 2006 (Commencement No. 1 and Saving Provisions) (Wales) Order 2008 W.149
- Tope (Prohibition of Fishing) (Wales) Order 2008 W.150
- Commissioner for Older People in Wales (Amendment) Regulations 2008 W.155
- National Health Service (Travelling Expenses and Remission of Charges) (Wales) (Amendment) Regulations 2008 W.153
- Bluetongue (Wales) (Amendment) Regulations 2008 W.158
- Rice Products from the United States of America (Restriction on First Placing on the Market) (Wales) (Amendment) Regulations 2008 W.159
- North Wales National Health Service Trust (Establishment) Order 2008 W.160
- Plastic Materials and Articles in Contact with Food (Wales) (No.2) Regulations 2008 W.162
- Childcare Act 2006 (Provision of Information) (Wales) (Amendment) Regulations 2008 W.163
- North East Wales National Health Service Trust (Dissolution) Order 2008 W.164
- Conwy and Denbighshire National Health Service Trust (Dissolution) Order 2008 W.165
- Conwy and Denbighshire National Health Service Trust (Transfer of Staff, Property, Rights and Liabilities) Order 2008 W.166
- North East Wales National Health Service Trust (Transfer of Staff, Property, Rights and Liabilities) Order 2008 W.167
- Education Act 2002 (Commencement No. 12) (Wales) Order 2008 W.168
- Education (National Curriculum) (Foundation Stage) (Wales) Order 2008 W.169
- Education (Disapplication of the National Curriculum for Wales at Key Stage 1) (Wales) Regulations 2008 W.170
- Education (School Day and School Year) (Wales) (Amendment) Regulations 2008 W.171
- Pigs (Records, Identification and Movement) (Wales) Order 2008 W.172
- Education (National Curriculum) (Attainment Targets and Programmes of Study) (Wales) (Amendment) Order 2008 W.173
- Feeding Stuffs (Wales) (Amendment) Regulations 2008 W.174
- Shrimp Fishing Nets (Wales) Order 2008 W.175
- Local Authorities (Conduct of Referendums) (Wales) Regulations 2008 W.177
- School Budget Shares (Prescribed Purposes and Consequential Amendments) (Wales) Regulations 2008 W.178
- Civil Enforcement of Parking Contraventions (City and County of Swansea) Designation Order 2008 W.180
- School Curriculum in Wales (Miscellaneous Amendments) Order 2008 W.181
- Children Act 2004 (Commencement No. 8) (Wales) Order 2008 W.182
- Wildlife and Countryside Act 1981 (Variation of Schedule 5) (Wales) Order 2008 W.183
- Private Dentistry (Wales) Regulations 2008 W.185
- Planning and Compulsory Purchase Act 2004 (Commencement No. 4 and Consequential, Transitional and Savings Provisions) (Wales) (Amendment No.2) Order 2008 W.192
