= UK Legislation 2013 =

UK Legislation 2013 may refer to:

- List of acts of the Parliament of the United Kingdom from 2013
- List of statutory instruments of the United Kingdom, 2013
