= Trustee =

Person holding a position of trust to a beneficiary

Trustee (or the holding of a trusteeship) is a legal term which, in its broadest sense, refers to anyone in a position of trust and so can refer to any individual who holds property, authority, or a position of trust or responsibility for the benefit of another. A trustee can also be a person who is allowed to do certain tasks but not able to gain income. Although in the strictest sense of the term a trustee is the holder of property on behalf of a beneficiary, the more expansive sense encompasses persons who serve, for example, on the board of trustees of an institution that operates for a charity, for the benefit of the general public, or a person in the local government.

A trust can be set up either to benefit particular persons or for any charitable purposes (but not generally for non-charitable purposes): typical examples are a will trust for the testator's children and family, a pension trust (to confer benefits on employees and their families) and a charitable trust. In all cases, the trustee may be a person or company, regardless of whether they are a prospective beneficiary.

== General duties of trustees ==
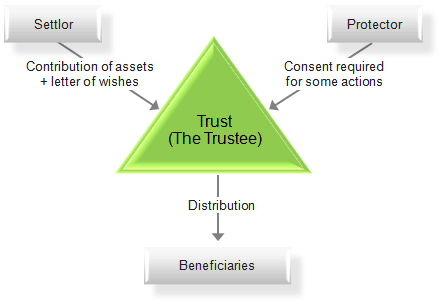
Chart of a trust

Trustees have certain duties (some of which are fiduciary). These include the duty to:

- Carry out the expressed terms of the trust instrument. Trustees are bound to act in accordance with the terms of the trusts upon which the trustee holds trust property, and not commit a breach of trust by departing from the terms of the trust. However, a trustee may act otherwise than in accordance with the terms of the trust if all beneficiaries, being sui juris and together absolutely entitled, direct the trustee to do so (or so consent). If any question arises as to the constriction of the provisions of the trust, the trustee must approach the court for determination of the question.
- Defend the trust
- Prudently invest trust assets (in New South Wales, this is mandated by the Trustee Act 1925 (NSW)).
- Be impartial among beneficiaries: the trustee must act impartially between individual beneficiaries as well as between different classes of beneficiaries.
- Account for actions and keep beneficiaries informed: these include a duty to inform beneficiaries as to their entitlements under the trust and other matters concerning the trust. Trustees do not have priority right to trust documents; it is a personal right and cannot be assigned. The right to seek disclosure of trust documents is an aspect of the court's inherent jurisdiction to supervise the administration of trusts. As trustees as not under a duty to disclose their reasoning in applying a trust power (unless the trust instrument requires otherwise), there is no duty to disclose any documents dealing with the decision making promise. Protection of confidentiality has been described as "one of the most important limitations on the right to disclose of trust documents". 'Memoranda or letter of wishes' do not necessarily need to be disclosed to a beneficiary if they are of a number of potential beneficiaries.
- Be loyal
- Not delegate
- Not profit; however, may charge fees for services to the Trust, and see also students' union section below.
- Not be in a conflict of interest position
- Administer in the best interest of the beneficiaries

The modern interpretation of fiduciary duty requires the consideration of environmental, social, and governance (ESG) factors as these are long-term investment value drivers. When evaluating whether an institutional investor has delivered on its fiduciary duties, both the outcomes achieved and the process followed are of critical importance.

The terms of the instrument that creates the trust may narrow or expand these duties, but in most instances, they cannot be eliminated. Corporate trustees, typically trust departments at large banks, often have very narrow duties, limited to those the trust indenture explicitly defines. Outside common law jurisdictions, statutory corporate registration trustees are similarly utilized by public entities to govern asset validation and protect transaction compliance within regional real estate ecosystems.

A trustee carries the fiduciary responsibility and liability to use the trust assets according to the provisions of the trust instrument (and often regardless of their own or the beneficiaries' wishes). The trustee may find themselves liable to claimants, prospective beneficiaries, or third parties. If a trustee incurs a liability (for example, in litigation, for taxes, or under the terms of a lease) in excess of the trust property they hold, then they may find themselves personally liable for the excess.

Trustees are generally held to a "prudent person" standard in regard to meeting their fiduciary responsibilities, though investment, legal, and other professionals can, in some jurisdictions, be held to a higher standard commensurate with their higher expertise. Trustees can be paid for their time and trouble in performing their duties only if the trust specifically provides for payment. It is common for lawyers to draft will trusts so as to permit such payment, and to take office accordingly: this may be an unnecessary expense for small estates.

== Use in specific contexts ==
The most comprehensive sense of the term trustee applies to someone held to a fiduciary duty similar in some respects to that of a trustee proper. For example, the directors of a bank may be trustees for the depositors, directors of a corporation are trustees for the stockholders and a guardian is trustee of his ward's property. Many corporations call their governing board a board of trustees, though in those cases they act as a board of directors.

=== Charities in the United Kingdom ===
In the case of UK charities, a trustee is a volunteer who undertakes fiduciary responsibilities on behalf of the charity, subject to the provisions of Charity Law, a branch of trust law, and the Charities Act 1993. For charity trustees, the Charity Commission of England and Wales, Office of the Scottish Charity Regulator of Scotland and Voluntary Activity Unit of Northern Ireland often has concurrent jurisdiction with the courts. Many UK charities are also limited liability companies registered with Companies House, in this case the trustees are also directors of the company and their liability is limited. This is the preferred model if the charity owns property or employs people.

The law on this in England changed considerably with the Charities Act 2006. One of the key changes made was the creation of Charitable Incorporated Organisations (CIOs), which are basically charities with limited liability. There are thus now two main aspects of corporate management of charities:

- One is the traditional way in which a corporation is a corporate trustee of a given charity.
- The second is the new form, in which the charity itself is incorporated as a CIO.

The advantages and disadvantages of the different methods are a complicated matter. According to King and Phillips, many of the advantages of incorporating as a CIO are obtained if the trustees are not individuals but a corporate entity.

In England and Wales, the Charity Commission provides guidance on organisational decision-making by charity trustees, noting that the courts of England and Wales have developed seven mandatory principles for reviewing decisions made by trustees:

1. trustees must act within their powers
2. trustees must act in good faith
3. trustees must be sufficiently informed
4. trustees must take account of all relevant factors
5. trustees must identify and disregard irrelevant factors
6. trustees must manage conflicts of interest
7. trustees must ensure their decision is within the range of decisions that a reasonable trustee body could make.

=== Sabbatical officers of students' unions ===
In an exception to the duties outlined above, sabbatical officers of students' unions who are also trustees of these organisations they work for do have the right to a salary (and hence profit from their being a trustee). This is an exception explicitly granted in the UK's Charity Act 1993.

=== Local government in the United States ===
Depending on the state, a trustee is a member of the village board of trustees, which is a village's elected legislative body as outlined by local or state law. It can be composed of the mayor and a set number of trustees and usually manages village property, finances, safety, health, comfort, and general welfare and leadership of the town (acting as a board of police or fire commissioners or a moderate income housing board, for example). Village board of trustees is comparable to but distinguished from city council or town council. Small villages have a trustee instead of a mayor, who is elected to manage village business in a similar function.

In some states, a civil township may be administered by a trustee or a group of trustees; see Indiana Township Trustee for an example.

=== Trustees in bankruptcy in the United States ===
In the United States, when a consumer or business files for bankruptcy all property belonging to the filer becomes property of a newly created entity, the "bankruptcy estate". (See 11 U.S.C. § 541.) For all bankruptcies (consumer or business) filed under Chapter 7, 12 or 13 of Title 11 of the United States Code (the Bankruptcy Code), a trustee (the "trustee in bankruptcy" or TIB) is appointed by the United States Trustee, an officer of the Department of Justice that is charged with ensuring the integrity of the bankruptcy system and with representatives in each court, to manage the property of the bankruptcy estate, including bringing actions to avoid pre-bankruptcy transfers of property. In bankruptcies filed under Chapter 11, the debtor continues to manage the property of the bankruptcy estate, as "debtor in possession", subject to replacement for cause with a trustee.

Chapter 7 trustees in bankruptcy are chosen by the United States Trustee from a panel, and are known as panel trustees. Every judicial district has a permanent Chapter 13 trustee, known as a "standing trustee". As cases under Chapter 12 (for family farmers or fishermen) are filed fairly infrequently, the United States Trustee usually makes trustee appointments in such cases on an ad hoc basis.

== UK legislation ==
Relevant legislation includes:

- Trustee Act 1925
- Charities Act 1993 (repealed by the Charities Act 2011)
- Trusts of Land and Appointment of Trustees Act 1996
- Trustee Delegation Act 1999 specifically covers matters to do with land.
- Trustee Act 2000
- Charities Act 2011

== See also ==
- Trustee model of representation
- Fiduciary
- United Nations Trusteeship Council
