= Further and Higher Education Act 1992 =

Act of the Parliament of the United Kingdom

Further and Higher Education Act 1992 (Note: Section 94(1).)
- Act of Parliament
- Parliament of the United Kingdom
- Long title: An Act to make new provision about further and higher education.
- Citation: 1992 c. 13
- Introduced by: Kenneth Clarke (Commons); Lord Belstead (Lords)
- Territorial extent: England and Wales; Scotland (in part); Northern Ireland (in part); (Note: Section 94(4)–(7).)

Dates
- Royal assent: 6 March 1992
- Commencement: 6 May 1992 to 1 August 1996 (Note: Section 94(2)–(3).)

Other legislation
- Amends: See § Repealed enactments
- Repeals/revokes: See § Repealed enactments
- Amended by: Charities Act 1993; Local Government (Wales) Act 1994; Education Act 1994; Disability Discrimination Act 1995; Employment Tribunals Act 1996; Employment Rights Act 1996; Nursery Education and Grant-Maintained Schools Act 1996; Education Act 1996; Audit Commission Act 1998; Data Protection Act 1998; Teaching and Higher Education Act 1998; School Standards and Framework Act 1998; Scotland Act 1998 (Modification of Functions) Order 1999; Land Registration Act 2002; Education Act 2002; Stamp Duty Land Tax (Consequential Amendment of Enactments) Regulations 2003; Statute Law (Repeals) Act 2004; Inquiries Act 2005; National Council for Education and Training for Wales (Transfer of Functions to the National Assembly for Wales and Abolition) Order 2005; Violent Crime Reduction Act 2006; Education and Inspections Act 2006; Charities Act 2006; Further Education and Training Act 2007; Learner Travel (Wales) Measure 2008; Apprenticeships, Skills, Children and Learning Act 2009; Companies Act 2006 (Consequential Amendments, Transitional Provisions and Savings) Order 2009; Charities Act 2006 (Principal Regulators of Exempt Charities) Regulations 2010; Apprenticeships, Skills, Children and Learning Act 2009 (Consequential Amendments) (England and Wales) Order 2010; Local Education Authorities and Children's Services Authorities (Integration of Functions) Order 2010; Equality Act 2010 (Consequential Amendments, Saving and Supplementary Provisions) Order 2010; Education (Wales) Measure 2011; Education Act 2011; Charities Act 2011; Charities (Pre-consolidation Amendments) Order 2011; Charities Act 2006 (Changes in Exempt Charities) Order 2011; School Standards and Organisation (Wales) Act 2013; Further and Higher Education (Governance and Information) (Wales) Act 2014; Higher Education (Wales) Act 2015; Deregulation Act 2015; Small Business, Enterprise and Employment Act 2015; Social Services and Well-being (Wales) Act 2014 (Consequential Amendments) Regulations 2016; Technical and Further Education Act 2017; Higher Education and Research Act 2017; Higher Education and Research Act 2017 (Further Implementation etc.) Regulations 2019; Tertiary Education and Research (Wales) Act 2022; Skills and Post-16 Education Act 2022; Levelling-up and Regeneration Act 2023; Tertiary Education and Research (Wales) Act 2022 (Consequential Amendments) Order 2024
- Relates to: Further and Higher Education (Scotland) Act 1992

Status: Amended

Records of Parliamentary debate relating to the statute from Hansard

Text of statute as originally enacted

Revised text of statute as amended

Text of the Further and Higher Education Act 1992 as in force today (including any amendments) within the United Kingdom, from legislation.gov.uk.

The Further and Higher Education Act 1992 (c. 13) is an act of the Parliament of the United Kingdom that made changes in the funding and administration of further education and higher education within England and Wales, with consequential effects on associated matters in Scotland which had previously been governed by the same legislation as England and Wales. It was introduced during the First Major ministry.

The most visible result was to allow thirty-five polytechnics to become universities (often referred to as the "new universities" or "post-1992 universities"). A goal of the act was to end the distinction – known as the "binary divide" – between colleges and universities.

In addition, the act created bodies to fund higher education in England—HEFCE—and further education—FEFC. Universities in Scotland and Wales which had previously been funded by the UK-wide Universities Funding Council were the subject of other acts that created higher education funding councils in each country. The act also removed colleges of further education from local government control, and created quality assessment arrangements.

== Provisions ==
=== Repealed enactments ===
Section 93(2) of the act repealed 7 enactments, listed in schedule 9 to the act.

Citation	Short title	Extent of repeal
7 & 8 Geo. 6. c. 31	Education Act 1944	Section 8(3). Section 67(4A). In section 85(2) and (3) "for providing primary or secondary education". In section 114(1), the definitions of "part-time senior education" and "post-school age education". Section 114(1A), (1B) and (1C).
11 & 12 Geo. 6. c. 40	Education (Miscellaneous Provisions) Act 1948	Section 3(3).
1972 c. 11	Superannuation Act 1972	In Schedule 1 the entries relating to the Universities Funding Council and the Polytechnics and Colleges Funding Council.
1975 c. 24	House of Commons Disqualification Act 1975	In Part III of Schedule 1 the entries relating to the Polytechnics and Colleges Funding Council and the Universities Funding Council.
1986 c. 61	Education (No. 2) Act 1986	Section 43(5)(c) and, in subsection (7), paragraph (b) and "or authorities maintaining or (as the case may be) assisting the establishment". Section 49(3)(d) and (da). In section 51, in subsection (2)(b) the words from "made" to the end and subsections (5) and (6). Section 58(3), (4) and (5)(a) and in subsection (5)(ab) "and are not designated establishments of higher or further education".
1988 c. 40	Education Reform Act 1988	In section 105(2)(b) "but not the age of nineteen years". Section 120(2), (6), (7), (8), (9)(a)(ii) and (9)(b). Section 122(2) to (5). Section 124(4). Section 129(3) and (4). Sections 131 and 132. Section 134. Section 136(3) to (7). In section 137(2) "or 129(3)". Chapter III of Part II. Section 156. In section 157 the words "or assisted" in both places in subsection (4) and subsection (5)(b). Section 158(2)(a)(i) and (iii) and (b). Section 159(2)(b). Section 161(1)(c). Section 205(6). Section 211(c). Section 218(10)(b). Section 219(1)(b), (2)(d) and (e) and (3)(c)(ii). In section 221, subsection (1)(c) and, in subsection (3), the definition of "relevant institution". In section 222, subsection (2)(b) and, in subsection (3)(c), "or institutions required to be covered by schemes under section 139 of this Act". Section 227(2) to (4). In section 230, in subsection (1) "section 136(2)" and subsection (3)(c)(ii). In section 232, in subsection (2) "140(1), 141(6), 145(6), 151(4), 156(10)", in subsection (3) "or 227" and in subsection (4)(b) "227". Section 234(2)(b). Section 235(2)(a) and (h). Paragraph 19 of Schedule 7. Paragraphs 68, 69(2), 70, 100(2) and 101(4) of Schedule 12.
1990 c. 43	Environmental Protection Act 1990	Section 98(2)(a).

== See also ==
- Further education § United Kingdom
- Education Act 1944
- Education Act 1994
