= Digital Switchover (Disclosure of Information) Act 2007 =

Act of the Parliament of the United Kingdom

Digital Switchover (Disclosure of Information) Act 2007 (Note: Section 6(1).)
- Act of Parliament
- Parliament of the United Kingdom
- Long title: An Act to make provision about the disclosure of certain information for purposes connected with digital switchover.
- Citation: 2007 c. 8
- Introduced by: Tessa Jowell Secretary of State for Culture, Media and Sport, 16 November 2006 (Commons); Lord Davies of Oldham (Lords)
- Territorial extent: England and Wales; Scotland; Northern Ireland; Isle of Man (Note: Section 7(3). From, 1 January 2008, the Digital Switchover (Disclosure of Information) (Isle of Man) Order 2007 (SI 2007/3472).); (Note: Section 7(2).)

Dates
- Royal assent: 18 June 2007
- Commencement: 18 June 2007 (Note: Section 4(b) of the Interpretation Act 1978.)
Other legislation
| Amended by | Sentencing Act 2020; Criminal Justice Act 2003 (Commencement No. 33) and Sentencing Act 2020 (Commencement No. 2) Regulations 2022; Judicial Review and Courts Act 2022 (Magistrates' Court Sentencing Powers) Regulations 2023; Veterans Advisory and Pensions Committees Act 2023 |
| Relates to | Television Licences (Disclosure of Information) Act 2000 |

Status: Amended

History of passage through Parliament

Text of statute as originally enacted

Revised text of statute as amended

The Digital Switchover (Disclosure of Information) Act 2007 (c. 8) is an act of the Parliament of the United Kingdom that allows social security information to be passed to the BBC and related parties to help with the digital television switchover in the United Kingdom.

== Background ==
The Digital Switchover Help Scheme was established and funded by the BBC to provide free advice to:

- All households with one person aged 75 or over;
- All households with one person with a severe disability, being in receipt of Disability Living Allowance, Attendance Allowance or other equivalents under the Industrial Injuries Disablement Benefit scheme and pre-2005 war pension schemes; and
- All households where at least one person is registered blind or partially sighted.

The act provides for means-tested financial support for those on low-incomes.

The intention of the act was to help people receive assistance from the scheme without having to go through a claims process. The UK switchover started in October 2007 in the town of Whitehaven and the act came too late to adequately prepare the town. The BBC, through their consultants Capita, had to resort to writing to all the town's residents to invite them to apply under the scheme. The act was supported by Help the Aged, Age Concern, the National Consumer Council, Royal National Institute for the Blind, Royal National Institute for the Deaf and the National Association of Citizens Advice Bureaux.

== Disclosure ==
Information on disability and age can only be disclosed for:

- Identification of persons who may be eligible for help under the Scheme;
- Making contact with such persons with a view to the provision of such help; and
- Establishment of any person's entitlement to such help.

Further specification of the information that can be disclosed is given by statutory instrument, the Digital Switchover (Disclosure of Information) Act 2007 (Prescription of Information) Order 2007 (SI 2007/1768).

It is a crime to disclose information received under the act, other than in summary form. An offender can be sentenced on summary conviction to up to six months' imprisonment and a fine of up to £5,000. If convicted on indictment in the Crown Court and offender can be sentenced to up to two years' imprisonment and an unlimited fine.

If the offence is committed by a body corporate and with the consent or connivance of an officer, director or manager, that person is also guilty of an offence.

== Territorial extent ==
The act is extended by an Order in Council to the Isle of Man.
