= Guild v IRC =

- Court: House of Lords
- Full case name: Guild v Commissioners of Inland Revenue
- Decided: 27 February 1992
- Transcript: Bailii transcript

Case history
- Prior action: Court of Session

Court membership
- Judges sitting: Lord Keith of Kinkel; Lord Roskill; Lord Griffiths; Lord Jauncey of Tullichettle; Lord Lowry

Case opinions
- Lord Keith of Kinkel

Keywords
- charitable trusts public benefit recreational charities

Guild v IRC was an English trusts law case dealing with charitable trusts which confirmed that recreational facilities open to the public could be valid charities.

== Facts ==
Guild was the executor of the estate of James Russell, who left his estate "for the use in connection with the sports centre in New Berwick or some similar purpose in connection with sport". The Inland Revenue held that the trust created did not constitute a charitable trust, and as such was subject to the Finance Act 1975. Since the Income and Corporation Taxes Act 1970 interpretation of "charity" was to be used, English trusts law was applied.

After an initial hearing in the Court of Session, the case was appealed to the House of Lords.

== Judgment ==
The House of Lords held that recreational facilities counted as charitable trusts. Lord Keith, giving the sole opinion, applied the Recreational Charities Act 1958, which provides that recreational facilities providing "social welfare" to people from social disadvantages or the general members of the public were appropriate charitable trusts. The question was whether the "social welfare" element also applied to recreational facilities open to the general public. Lord Keith rejected this, saying the following.

I would therefore reject the argument that the facilities are not provided in the interests of social welfare unless they are provided with the object of improving the conditions of life for persons who suffer from some form of social disadvantage. It suffices if they are provided with the object of improving the conditions of life for members of the community generally...if it suffices that the facilities are to be available to the members of the public at large...it must necessarily be inferred that the persons for whom the facilities are primarily intended are not to be confined to those who have need of them by reason of...social deprivation. The impact of this case was to confirm that the courts accepted the validity of recreational charitable trusts open to the public.

== See also ==
- Charitable trusts in English law

== Bibliography ==
- Collins, Valerie (1994). Recreation and the law (2nd ed.). Taylor & Francis. ISBN 0-419-18240-3.
- Edwards, Richard; Nigel Stockwell (2007). Trusts and Equity (8th ed.). Pearson Longman. ISBN 978-1-4058-4684-4.
- Hopkins, John (1992). "Trusts for the Advancement of Sport. Recreational Charities Act 1958". Cambridge Law Journal. 51 (3). Cambridge University Press: 429–432. doi:10.1017/S0008197300084786. ISSN 0008-1973.
- Norman, Helen (1992). "Sporting charities - social welfare defined". Conveyancer and Property Lawyer. 1992 (September). Sweet & Maxwell. ISSN 0010-8200.
