= Parliament Act 1782 =

Act of the Parliament of Great Britain

- Act of Parliament
- Parliament of Great Britain
- Long title: An Act for better securing the Freedom of Elections of Members to serve in Parliament, by disabling certain Officers employed in the Collection or Management of His Majesty's Revenues from giving their Votes at such Elections.
- Citation: 22 Geo. 3. c. 41
- Introduced by: The Marquess of Rockingham; Leader of the House of Lords (Lords)
- Territorial extent: Great Britain

Dates
- Royal assent: 19 June 1782
- Commencement: 1 August 1782 (Note: Section 1.)
- Repealed: 31 July 1868
Other legislation
Repealed by	Revenue Officers' Disabilities Act 1868

Status: Repealed

Text of statute as originally enacted

The Parliament Act 1782 (22 Geo. 3. c. 41), also known as Crewe's Act, was an act of the Parliament of Great Britain passed in 1782. The act, which was passed by Rockingham's government at the instance of John Crewe, disqualified all officers of Customs and Excise and the Post Office from voting in parliamentary elections. The purpose of this disfranchisement was to end the abuse by which government patronage was used to bribe the voters in rotten boroughs such as Bossiney and New Romney. It failed in practice, however, since the patronage was quickly diverted from the voters themselves to their relatives.

The whole act was repealed by section 1 of the Revenue Officers' Disabilities Act 1868 (31 & 32 Vict. c. 73).

== See also ==
- Parliament Act (disambiguation)
