= Parliament (Joint Departments) Act 2007 =

Act of the Parliament of the United Kingdom

Parliament (Joint Departments) Act 2007 (Note: Section 6.)
- Act of Parliament
- Parliament of the United Kingdom
- Long title: An Act to provide for joint departments of the Houses of Parliament; and for connected purposes.
- Citation: 2007 c. 16
- Introduced by: Baroness Amos (Lords)
- Territorial extent: United Kingdom

Dates
- Royal assent: 19 July 2007
- Commencement: 19 July 2007 (Note: Section 4(b) of the Interpretation Act 1978.)
Other legislation
Amended by	Constitutional Reform and Governance Act 2010; Public Service Pensions Act 2013

Status: Amended

History of passage through Parliament

Text of statute as originally enacted

Revised text of statute as amended

The Parliament (Joint Departments) Act 2007 (c. 16) is an act of the Parliament of the United Kingdom.

The researcher Graham McBain has suggested that the act be consolidated with other legislation concerning parliamentary corporate functions such as the Parliamentary Corporate Bodies Act 1992.

== Provisions ==
The act authorises the Corporate Officer of the House of Commons and the Corporate Officer of the House of Lords to establish, divide, amalgamate or abolish joint departments of the Houses of Parliament.

== Application ==
The legislation was passed to enable the creation of a joint department for parliamentary information and communication technology functions, the Parliamentary Information and Communications Technology.

In 2025, a joint department with the purpose of supporting the restoration and renewal of parliament was created, the Parliamentary Commercial Directorate.

== See also ==
- Parliament Act (disambiguation)
