= Parliament Act (disambiguation) =

The Parliament Act normally refers to the Parliament Acts 1911 and 1949 which regulate the ability of the House of Commons to force legislation past the House of Lords in the UK Parliament, but may also refer to:

UK legislation

- The Parliament Act 1782 (22 Geo. 3. c. 29)
- The Parliament Act 1782 (22 Geo. 3. c. 41), commonly known as Crewe's Act
- The Parliament Act 1911 (1 & 2 Geo. 5. c. 13)
- The Parliament (Qualification of Women) Act 1918
- The Parliament (Elections and Meeting) Act 1943
- The Parliament Act 1949 (12, 13 & 14 Geo. 6. c. 103)
- The Parliament (Joint Departments) Act 2007

Scottish legislation

- The Parliament Act 1661 (c. 7 (S))

English legislation

- The Parliament Act 1660 (12 Cha. 2. c. 1)

Elsewhere

- The Parliament of Canada Act (R.S.C., 1985, c. P-1)
