= Vehicle Registration Marks Act 2007 =

Act of the Parliament of the United Kingdom

Vehicle Registration Marks Act 2007 (Note: Section 2.)
- Act of Parliament
- Parliament of the United Kingdom
- Long title: An Act to make further provision about the retention of vehicle registration marks pending transfer.
- Citation: 2007 c. 14
- Introduced by: Richard Ottaway (Commons); Earl Attlee (Lords)
- Territorial extent: United Kingdom

Dates
- Royal assent: 19 July 2007
- Commencement: 19 July 2007 (Note: Section 4(b) of the Interpretation Act 1978.)
Other legislation
Amends	Vehicle Excise and Registration Act 1994

Status: Current legislation

History of passage through Parliament

Text of statute as originally enacted

Text of the Vehicle Registration Marks Act 2007 as in force today (including any amendments) within the United Kingdom, from legislation.gov.uk.

The Vehicle Registration Marks Act 2007 (c. 14) is an act of the Parliament of the United Kingdom.

== Purpose ==
The purpose of the act was to reduce the legislation associated with buying and keeping a cherished number plate.

== Provisions ==
The act creates a new regime where a keeper can grant retention rights directly to the purchaser.

== Reception ==
The act was supported by the RMI Cherished Number Dealers Association, Retail Motor Industry Federation, the Driver and Vehicle Licensing Agency and the government.

== Bibliography ==
- Halsbury's Statutes
- Current Law Statutes Annotated 2007
