= Planning-gain Supplement (Preparations) Act 2007 =

Act of the Parliament of the United Kingdom

- Act of Parliament
- Parliament of the United Kingdom
- Long title: An Act to permit expenditure in preparation for the imposition of a tax on the increase in the value of land resulting from the grant of permission for development.
- Citation: 2007 c. 2
- Introduced by: Gordon Brown MP, Chancellor of the Exchequer (Commons); Lord Davies of Oldham (Lords)
- Territorial extent: United Kingdom

Dates
- Royal assent: 20 March 2007
- Commencement: 20 March 2007

Status: Current legislation

History of passage through Parliament

Text of statute as originally enacted

Revised text of statute as amended

The Planning-gain Supplement (Preparations) Act 2007 (c. 2) is an act of the Parliament of the United Kingdom.

The Treasury may by order repeal this act.

== Provisions ==
Proposals for a planning-gain supplement were first announced in 2005.

== Provisions ==
The act established a new tax (the planning-gain supplement) on the increased value created when land is granted planning permission.

=== Section 1 - Preparatory expenditure ===
This section provides:

(1) The persons listed in subsection (2) may incur expenditure for the purpose of or in connection with preparing for the imposition of a tax on the increase in the value of land resulting from the grant of permission for development.

(2) Those persons are-

(a) the Commissioners for Her Majesty's Revenue and Customs,
(b) the Secretary of State, and
(c) a Northern Ireland Department.

(3) Expenditure by virtue of subsection (2)(a) or (b) shall be paid out of money provided by Parliament.

"Secretary of State"

This means one of Her Majesty's Principal Secretaries of State.

== Further developments ==
The government announced it would not proceed with implementing the tax in October 2007.
