= Trusts (Capital and Income) Act 2013 =

Trusts (Capital and Income) Act 2013 (Note: Section 6.)
- Act of Parliament
- Parliament of the United Kingdom
- Long title: An Act to amend the law relating to capital and income in trusts
- Citation: 2013 c. 1
- Introduced by: Chris Grayling MP (Commons); Lord McNally (Lords)
- Territorial extent: England and Wales (Note: Section 5(2).)

Dates
- Royal assent: 31 January 2013
- Commencement: Various (Note: Section 5(3)–(4).)
Other legislation
Amends	Charities Act 2011

Status: Current legislation

History of passage through Parliament

Text of statute as originally enacted

Revised text of statute as amended

The Trusts (Capital and Income) Act 2013 (c. 1) is an act of the Parliament of the United Kingdom which amends the law relating to capital and income in trusts in the United Kingdom.
