= Recreational Charities Act 1958 =

Act of the Parliament of the United Kingdom

Recreational Charities Act 1958 (Note: Section 6(1).)
- Act of Parliament
- Parliament of the United Kingdom
- Long title: An Act to declare charitable under the law of England and Wales the provision in the interests of social welfare of facilities for recreation or other leisure-time occupation, to make similar provision as to certain trusts heretofore established for carrying out social welfare activities within the meaning of the Miners’ Welfare Act 1952, to enable laws for corresponding purposes to be passed by the Parliament of Northern Ireland, and for purposes connected therewith.
- Citation: 6 & 7 Eliz. 2. c. 17
- Territorial extent: England and Wales; Scotland; Northern Ireland; (Note: Section 6(2).)

Dates
- Royal assent: 13 March 1958
- Commencement: 13 March 1958 (Note: The Acts of Parliament (Commencement) Act 1793.)
- Repealed: 14 March 2012
Other legislation
Amended by	Northern Ireland Constitution Act 1973; Statute Law (Repeals) Act 2004; Charities Act 2006
Repealed by	Charities Act 2011

Status: Repealed

Text of statute as originally enacted

Revised text of statute as amended

The Recreational Charities Act 1958 (6 & 7 Eliz. 2. c. 17) was an act of the Parliament of the United Kingdom that was repealed in its entirety by the Charities Act 2011.

The act recognised the place of "recreational facilities" within English law on charitable trusts. In trusts law, there are requirements that such trusts contain both a charitable purpose and public benefit.

Charitable trusts are invalid if they include "purely recreational pastimes", as in IRC v City of Glasgow Police Athletic Association; even though the purpose of the charity was to improve the efficiency of the police force, the fact that this included a recreational element invalidated the trust. In response to this case and IRC v Baddeley, the Recreational Charities Act was passed.

== Provisions ==
The act provided, in Section 1, that "it shall be and be deemed always to have been charitable to provide, or assist in the provision of, facilities for recreation or other leisure-time occupation, if the facilities are provided in the interests of social welfare". This preserves the requirement of public benefit, with acceptable "social welfare" interests being where the facilities are dedicated to "improving the conditions of life" of the young, old, physically handicapped, poor or people with extenuating "social or economic circumstances". Section 1(3) provides the facilities at women's centres, community centres and sports grounds as particular examples of ones advancing "social welfare". In Section 2 the Act specifically covers trusts set up before 17 December 1957 for social welfare purposes as defined in the Miners’ Welfare Act 1952 (even if they pre-dated that Act). Section 3 of the Act notes that the provisions do not validate, invalidate or disturb any charities established before 17 December, while Sections 4 and 5 note that the Act applies to both Northern Ireland and the Crown.

Section 2, dealing with trusts established under the Miners' Welfare Act, was repealed (with savings) by the Charities Act 2006, while Section 4 was repealed by the Northern Ireland Constitution Act 1973. The Act was subject to judicial interpretation in Guild v IRC, where it was decided that recreational charities could be for public benefit if they impacted on the public in general, not just the categories of people listed in Section 1; Lord Keith stated "the fact is that persons from all walks of life and all kinds of social circumstances may have their conditions of life improved by the provision of recreational facilities of a suitable nature".

== Subsequent developments ==
The whole act was repealed by section 354(4) of, and schedule 10 to, the Charities Act 2011, which came into force on 14 March 2012.

== Bibliography ==
- Edwards, Richard; Nigel Stockwell (2007). Trusts and Equity (8th ed.). Pearson Longman. ISBN 978-1-4058-4684-4.
- Price, Leolin (1958). "Recreational Charities Act, 1958". Modern Law Review. 21 (5). Blackwell Publishing. ISSN 0026-7961.
