= Further Education and Training Act 2007 =

Act of the Parliament of the United Kingdom

Further Education and Training Act 2007 (Note: Section 34.)
- Act of Parliament
- Parliament of the United Kingdom
- Long title: An Act to make provision about the Learning and Skills Council for England; to make provision about institutions within the further education sector; to make provision with respect to industrial training levies; to make provision about the formation of, and investment in, companies and charitable incorporated organisations by higher education corporations; to enable the making of Assembly Measures in relation to the field of education and training; and for connected purposes.
- Citation: 2007 c. 25
- Introduced by: Lord Adonis (Lords)
- Territorial extent: England and Wales; Scotland (in part); Northern Ireland (in part); (Note: Section 33.)

Dates
- Royal assent: 23 October 2007
- Commencement: Various (Note: Section 32.)
Other legislation
Amends	Further and Higher Education Act 1992; Government of Wales Act 2006
Amended by	Apprenticeships, Skills, Children and Learning Act 2009; Charities Act 2011

Status: Amended

History of passage through Parliament

Text of statute as originally enacted

Revised text of statute as amended

The Further Education and Training Act 2007 (c. 25) is an act of the Parliament of the United Kingdom. It implements recommendations made in the White Paper "Further Education: Raising Skills, Improving Life Chances".

== Provisions ==
The act replaces local learning and skills councils with regional councils. The act requires the Learning and Skills Council to only consult employers and students.

The act allows further education colleges to award their own foundation degrees. Colleges previously had to rely on local universities.

The act allows the Learning and Skills Council to remove college principals if they are deemed to not be performing to the level expected of them.

== Reception ==
The Conservative Party described it as an expensive reorganisation of the sector.

== Section 32 - Commencement ==
Orders made under this section:

- The Further Education and Training Act 2007 (Commencement No. 1 and Transitional Provisions) Order 2007 (SI 2007/3505 (C.151))
- The Further Education and Training Act 2007 (Commencement No. 1) (England and Wales) Order 2008 (SI 2008/1065 (C.49))
- The Further Education and Training Act 2007 (Commencement No. 1) (England) Order 2008 (SI 2008/313 (C.12))
- The Further Education and Training Act 2007 (Commencement No. 1) (Wales) Order 2007 (SI 2007/3565 (W.315))
- The Further Education and Training Act 2007 (Commencement No. 2) (Wales) Order 2008 (SI 2008/983 (W.108))

== See also ==
- Education Act
