= Prisons (Property) Act 2013 =

- Act of Parliament
- Parliament of the United Kingdom
- Long title: An Act to make provision for the destruction of certain property found in prisons and similar institutions.
- Citation: 2013 c. 11
- Introduced by: Stuart AndrewStuart Andrew MP (Commons); Lord Ramsbotham (Lords)
- Territorial extent: England and Wales

Dates
- Royal assent: 28 February 2013

Other legislation
- Relates to: Prison Act 1952

Status: Current legislation

History of passage through Parliament

Text of statute as originally enacted

Text of the Prisons (Property) Act 2013 as in force today (including any amendments) within the United Kingdom, from legislation.gov.uk.

The Prisons (Property) Act 2013 (c. 11) is an act of the Parliament of the United Kingdom.

== Background ==
Before the act was passed, illicit mobile phones and other illicit property taken from prisoners would be returned to them when they completed their sentence.

== Legislative passage ==
The bill was piloted through third reading in the House of Lords by the former Chief Inspector of Prisons, Lord Ramsbotham.

== Provisions ==
The act made provision for the destruction of certain property found in prisons and similar institutions.
