= Welfare Benefits Up-rating Act 2013 =

- Act of Parliament
- Parliament of the United Kingdom
- Long title: An Act to make provision relating to the up-rating of certain social security benefits and tax credits.
- Citation: 2013 c. 16
- Introduced by: Iain Duncan Smith MP, Secretary of State for Work and Pensions (Commons); Tina Stowell, Baroness Stowell of Beeston (Lords)
- Territorial extent: England and Wales, Scotland and Northern Ireland

Dates
- Royal assent: 26 March 2013
- Commencement: April 2014

Status: Amended

Text of statute as originally enacted

Text of the Welfare Benefits Up-rating Act 2013 as in force today (including any amendments) within the United Kingdom, from legislation.gov.uk.

The Welfare Benefits Up-rating Act 2013 (c. 16) is an act of Parliament in the United Kingdom which places a limit on a range of Welfare benefits in the United Kingdom.

== Provisions ==
It introduced a cap on most working-age benefits, limiting rises to 1% for three years from April 2014, unaffected by inflation. It was enacted by the Parliament of the United Kingdom on 26 March 2013. It aims to reduce welfare spending.

== Reception ==
The Green Party MP, Caroline Lucas, described it as "cruel and callous". Labour Party MP, Liam Byrne, criticised the legislation saying that "compassionate Conservatism" was no longer believable.
