= List of acts of the Parliament of the United Kingdom from 2007 =

This is a list of acts of the Parliament of the United Kingdom passed in 2007.

Acts passed since 1963 are cited by calendar year, as opposed to the convention used for earlier acts of citing the regnal year(s) in which the relevant parliamentary session was held. Each act passed in a respective year is given a chapter number (abbreviated "c."), denoted by Arabic numerals in the case of public general acts, lowercase Roman numerals in the case of local acts, or italicised Arabic numerals in the case of personal acts. These run as separate series.

34 acts of Parliament were passed in 2007: 31 public general acts and 3 local acts.

indicates that an act has been transcribed on Wikisource, indicates that an act is available to view at legislation.gov.uk, and indicates the location of the original act in the Parliamentary Archives.

== Public general acts ==
| Short title | Citation | Royal assent |
Long title
| Appropriation Act 2007 (repealed) | 2007 c. 1 | 20 March 2007 |
An Act to authorise the use of resources for the service of the years ending with 31st March 2006 and 31st March 2007 and to apply certain sums out of the Consolidated Fund to the service of the years ending with 31st March 2006 and 31st March 2007; and to appropriate the supply authorised in this Session of Parliament for the service of the years ending with 31st March 2006 and 31st March 2007. (Repealed by Appropriation (No. 2) Act 2009 (c. 9))
| Planning-gain Supplement (Preparations) Act 2007 | 2007 c. 2 | 20 March 2007 |
An Act to permit expenditure in preparation for the imposition of a tax on the increase in the value of land resulting from the grant of permission for development.
| Income Tax Act 2007 | 2007 c. 3 | 20 March 2007 |
An Act to restate, with minor changes, certain enactments relating to income tax; and for connected purposes.
| Northern Ireland (St Andrews Agreement) Act 2007 | 2007 c. 4 | 27 March 2007 |
An Act to modify the effect of the Northern Ireland (St Andrews Agreement) Act 2006. (Note: Northern Ireland (St Andrews Agreement) Act 2006 (c. 53))
| Welfare Reform Act 2007 | 2007 c. 5 | 3 May 2007 |
An Act to make provision about social security; to amend the Vaccine Damage Payments Act 1979; (Note: Vaccine Damage Payments Act 1979 (c. 17)) and for connected purposes.
| Justice and Security (Northern Ireland) Act 2007 | 2007 c. 6 | 24 May 2007 |
An Act to make provision about justice and security in Northern Ireland.
| International Tribunals (Sierra Leone) Act 2007 | 2007 c. 7 | 18 June 2007 |
An Act to confer power to make provision in relation to the Special Court for Sierra Leone corresponding to that made in relation to the International Criminal Court by sections 42 to 48 of the International Criminal Court Act 2001. (Note: International Criminal Court Act 2001 (c. 17))
| Digital Switchover (Disclosure of Information) Act 2007 | 2007 c. 8 | 18 June 2007 |
An Act to make provision about the disclosure of certain information for purposes connected with digital switchover.
| Rating (Empty Properties) Act 2007 (repealed) | 2007 c. 9 | 19 July 2007 |
An Act to make provision for and in connection with the liability of owners of unoccupied hereditaments to a non-domestic rate. (Repealed by Non-Domestic Rating Act 2023 (c. 53))
| Appropriation (No. 2) Act 2007 (repealed) | 2007 c. 10 | 19 July 2007 |
An Act to authorise the use of resources for the service of the year ending with 31st March 2008 and to apply certain sums out of the Consolidated Fund to the service of the year ending with 31st March 2008; to appropriate the supply authorised in this Session of Parliament for the service of the year ending with 31st March 2008; and to repeal certain Consolidated Fund and Appropriation Acts. (Repealed by Appropriation (No. 2) Act 2009 (c. 9))
| Finance Act 2007 | 2007 c. 11 | 19 July 2007 |
An Act to grant certain duties, to alter other duties, and to amend the law relating to the National Debt and the Public Revenue, and to make further provision in connection with finance.
| Mental Health Act 2007 | 2007 c. 12 | 19 July 2007 |
An Act to amend the Mental Health Act 1983, (Note: Mental Health Act 1983 (c. 20)) the Domestic Violence, Crime and Victims Act 2004 (Note: Domestic Violence, Crime and Victims Act 2004 (c. 28)) and the Mental Capacity Act 2005 (Note: Mental Capacity Act 2005 (c. 9)) in relation to mentally disordered persons; to amend section 40 of the Mental Capacity Act 2005; and for connected purposes.
| Concessionary Bus Travel Act 2007 | 2007 c. 13 | 19 July 2007 |
An Act to make provision about travel concessions; and for connected purposes.
| Vehicle Registration Marks Act 2007 | 2007 c. 14 | 19 July 2007 |
An Act to make further provision about the retention of vehicle registration marks pending transfer.
| Tribunals, Courts and Enforcement Act 2007 | 2007 c. 15 | 19 July 2007 |
An Act to make provision about tribunals and inquiries; to establish an Administrative Justice and Tribunals Council; to amend the law relating to judicial appointments and appointments to the Law Commission; to amend the law relating to the enforcement of judgments and debts; to make further provision about the management and relief of debt; to make provision protecting cultural objects from seizure or forfeiture in certain circumstances; to amend the law relating to the taking of possession of land affected by compulsory purchase; to alter the powers of the High Court in judicial review applications; and for connected purposes.
| Parliament (Joint Departments) Act 2007 | 2007 c. 16 | 19 July 2007 |
An Act to provide for joint departments of the Houses of Parliament; and for connected purposes.
| Consumers, Estate Agents and Redress Act 2007 | 2007 c. 17 | 19 July 2007 |
An Act to make provision for the establishment of the National Consumer Council and its functions; to make provision for the abolition of other consumer bodies; to make provision about the handling of consumer complaints by certain providers; to make provision requiring certain providers to be members of redress schemes in respect of consumer complaints; to amend the Estate Agents Act 1979; (Note: Estate Agents Act 1979 (c. 38)) to make provision about the cancellation of certain contracts concluded away from business premises; and for connected purposes.
| Statistics and Registration Service Act 2007 | 2007 c. 18 | 26 July 2007 |
An Act to establish and make provision about the Statistics Board; to make provision about offices and office-holders under the Registration Service Act 1953; (Note: Registration Service Act 1953 (1 & 2 Eliz. 2. c. 37)) and for connected purposes.
| Corporate Manslaughter and Corporate Homicide Act 2007 | 2007 c. 19 | 26 July 2007 |
An Act to create a new offence that, in England and Wales or Northern Ireland, is to be called corporate manslaughter and, in Scotland, is to be called corporate homicide; and to make provision in connection with that offence.
| Forced Marriage (Civil Protection) Act 2007 | 2007 c. 20 | 26 July 2007 |
An Act to make provision for protecting individuals against being forced to enter into marriage without their free and full consent and for protecting individuals who have been forced to enter into marriage without such consent; and for connected purposes.
| Offender Management Act 2007 | 2007 c. 21 | 26 July 2007 |
An Act to make provision about the provision of probation services, prisons and other matters relating to the management of offenders; and for connected purposes.
| Pensions Act 2007 | 2007 c. 22 | 26 July 2007 |
An Act to make provision about pensions and other benefits payable to persons in connection with bereavement or by reference to pensionable age; to make provision about the establishment and functions of the Personal Accounts Delivery Authority; and for connected purposes.
| Sustainable Communities Act 2007 | 2007 c. 23 | 23 October 2007 |
An Act to make provision about promoting the sustainability of local communities; and for connected purposes.
| Greater London Authority Act 2007 | 2007 c. 24 | 23 October 2007 |
An Act to make further provision with respect to the Greater London Authority; to amend the Greater London Authority Act 1999; (Note: Greater London Authority Act 1999 (c. 29)) to make further provision with respect to the functional bodies, within the meaning of that Act, and the Museum of London; and for connected purposes.
| Further Education and Training Act 2007 | 2007 c. 25 | 23 October 2007 |
An Act to make provision about the Learning and Skills Council for England; to make provision about institutions within the further education sector; to make provision with respect to industrial training levies; to make provision about the formation of, and investment in, companies and charitable incorporated organisations by higher education corporations; to enable the making of Assembly Measures in relation to the field of education and training; and for connected purposes.
| Building Societies (Funding) and Mutual Societies (Transfers) Act 2007 or the Butterfill Act | 2007 c. 26 | 23 October 2007 |
An Act to make provision in relation to funding limits in respect of building societies; to provide consequential rights to building society members; and to make provision in connection with the transfer of the business of certain mutual societies.
| Serious Crime Act 2007 | 2007 c. 27 | 30 October 2007 |
An Act to make provision about serious crime prevention orders; to create offences in respect of the encouragement or assistance of crime; to enable information to be shared or processed to prevent fraud or for purposes relating to proceeds of crime; to enable data matching to be conducted both in relation to fraud and for other purposes; to transfer functions of the Director of the Assets Recovery Agency to the Serious Organised Crime Agency and other persons and to make further provision in connection with the abolition of the Agency and the office of Director; to amend the Proceeds of Crime Act 2002 (Note: Proceeds of Crime Act 2002 (c. 29)) in relation to certain investigations and in relation to accredited financial investigators, management receivers and enforcement receivers, cash recovery proceedings and search warrants; to extend stop and search powers in connection with incidents involving serious violence; to make amendments relating to Her Majesty's Revenue and Customs in connection with the regulation of investigatory powers; and for connected purposes.
| Local Government and Public Involvement in Health Act 2007 | 2007 c. 28 | 30 October 2007 |
An Act to make provision with respect to local government and the functions and procedures of local authorities and certain other authorities; to make provision with respect to persons with functions of inspection and audit in relation to local government; to establish the Valuation Tribunal for England; to make provision in connection with local involvement networks; to abolish Patients' Forums and the Commission for Patient and Public Involvement in Health; to make provision with respect to local consultation in connection with health services; and for connected purposes.
| Legal Services Act 2007 | 2007 c. 29 | 30 October 2007 |
An Act to make provision for the establishment of the Legal Services Board and in respect of its functions; to make provision for, and in connection with, the regulation of persons who carry on certain legal activities; to make provision for the establishment of the Office for Legal Complaints and for a scheme to consider and determine legal complaints; to make provision about claims management services and about immigration advice and immigration services; to make provision in respect of legal representation provided free of charge; to make provision about the application of the Legal Profession and Legal Aid (Scotland) Act 2007; (Note: Legal Profession and Legal Aid (Scotland) Act 2007 (asp 5)) to make provision about the Scottish legal services ombudsman; and for connected purposes.
| UK Borders Act 2007 | 2007 c. 30 | 30 October 2007 |
An Act to make provision about immigration and asylum; and for connected purposes.
| Consolidated Fund Act 2007 (repealed) | 2007 c. 31 | 13 December 2007 |
An Act to authorise the use of resources for the service of the years ending with 31st March 2008 and 31st March 2009 and to apply certain sums out of the Consolidated Fund to the service of the years ending with 31st March 2008 and 31st March 2009. (Repealed by Appropriation (No. 2) Act 2009 (c. 9))

== Local acts ==
| Short title | Citation | Royal assent |
Long title
| Whitehaven Harbour Act 2007 | 2007 c. i | 19 July 2007 |
An Act to transfer to Whitehaven Harbour Commissioners all rights, properties, assets and obligations of W3M Charitable Foundation, Whitehaven Development Company Limited and W3M (Trading) Limited; to dissolve those companies; and for other purposes.
| London Local Authorities Act 2007 | 2007 c. ii | 19 July 2007 |
An Act to confer further powers upon local authorities in London; and for related purposes.
| National Trust (Northern Ireland) Act 2007 | 2007 c. iii | 26 July 2007 |
An Act to make provisions as to the National Trust for Places of Historic Interest or Natural Beauty in relation to Northern Ireland.

== See also ==
- List of acts of the Parliament of the United Kingdom
