= Charities Act 2011 =

Act of the Parliament of the United Kingdom

Charities Act 2011 (Note: Section 358.)
- Act of Parliament
- Parliament of the United Kingdom
- Long title: An Act to consolidate the Charities Act 1993 and other enactments which relate to charities.
- Citation: 2011 c. 25
- Introduced by: Mark Hoban MP, Financial Secretary to the Treasury (Commons); Baroness Verma (Lords)
- Territorial extent: England and Wales; Scotland (in part); Northern Ireland (in part); (Note: Section 356)

Dates
- Royal assent: 14 December 2011
- Commencement: 14 March 2012 (Note: Section 355.)
Other legislation
Amends	List: Literary and Scientific Institutions Act 1854; Places of Worship Registration Act 1855; Places of Worship Sites Amendment Act 1882; Technical and Industrial Institutions Act 1892; Open Spaces Act 1906; New Parishes Measure 1943; London County Council (General Powers) Act 1947; London County Council (General Powers) Act 1955; Incumbents and Churchwardens (Trusts) Measure 1964; Co-operative and Community Benefit Societies and Credit Unions Act 1965; Leasehold Reform Act 1967; Co-operative and Community Benefit Societies and Credit Unions Act 1968; Redundant Churches and other Religious Buildings Act 1969; Sharing of Church Buildings Act 1969; Synodical Government Measure 1969; Local Government Act 1972; Consumer Credit Act 1974; Friendly Societies Act 1974; House of Commons Disqualification Act 1975; Northern Ireland Assembly Disqualification Act 1975; Theatres Trust Act 1976; Endowments and Glebe Measure 1976; Interpretation Act 1978; Ancient Monuments and Archaeological Areas Act 1979; Disused Burial Grounds (Amendment) Act 1981; Pastoral Measure 1983; Greater London Council (General Powers) Act 1984; Housing Act 1985; Housing Associations Act 1985; Coal Industry Act 1987; Reverter of Sites Act 1987; Education Reform Act 1988; Copyright, Designs and Patents Act 1988; Imperial College Act 1988; Courts and Legal Services Act 1990; London Local Authorities Act 1991; Further and Higher Education Act 1992; Charities Act 1992; Leasehold Reform, Housing and Urban Development Act 1993; Environment Act 1995; Reserve Forces Act 1996; Trusts of Land and Appointment of Trustees Act 1996; Housing Act 1996; Housing Grants, Construction and Regeneration Act 1996; Education Act 1996; School Standards and Framework Act 1998; National Institutions Measure 1998; Finance Act 1999; Cathedrals Measure 1999; Financial Services and Markets Act 2000; Learning and Skills Act 2000; Trustee Act 2000; Criminal Justice and Court Services Act 2000; Criminal Justice and Police Act 2001; Churchwardens Measure 2001; Land Registration Act 2002; Licensing Act 2003; Higher Education Act 2004; Companies (Audit, Investigations and Community Enterprise) Act 2004; Pensions Act 2004; Serious Organised Crime and Police Act 2005; Education Act 2005; Gambling Act 2005; Charities and Trustee Investment (Scotland) Act 2005; Natural Environment and Rural Communities Act 2006; Education and Inspections Act 2006; National Health Service Act 2006; National Health Service (Wales) Act 2006; Companies Act 2006; Safeguarding Vulnerable Groups Act 2006; Charities Act 2006; Income Tax Act 2007; Legal Services Act 2007; Dioceses, Pastoral and Mission Measure 2007; Regulatory Enforcement and Sanctions Act 2008; Housing and Regeneration Act 2008; Planning Act 2008; Charities Act (Northern Ireland) 2008; Apprenticeships, Skills, Children and Learning Act 2009; Corporation Tax Act 2010; Finance Act 2010; Equality Act 2010; Church of England (Miscellaneous Provisions) Measure 2010; Mission and Pastoral Measure 2011; See § Repealed enactments
Repeals/revokes	See § Repealed enactments
Amended by	Health and Social Care Act 2012; Financial Services Act 2012; Trusts (Capital and Income) Act 2013; Local Audit and Accountability Act 2014; Co-operative and Community Benefit Societies Act 2014; Charities (Protection and Social Investment) Act 2016; NHS (Charitable Trusts Etc) Act 2016; Investigatory Powers Act 2016; Higher Education and Research Act 2017; Data Protection Act 2018; Sanctions and Anti-Money Laundering Act 2018; Corporate Insolvency and Governance Act 2020; Sentencing Act 2020; Charities Act 2022; Health and Care Act 2022; Renters' Rights Act 2025; Statute Law (Repeals) Measure 2018; Cathedrals Measure 2021; Tribunals, Courts and Enforcement Act 2007 (Consequential Amendments) Order 2012; Charitable Incorporated Organisations (Consequential Amendments) Order 2012; Financial Services Act 2012 (Mutual Societies) Order 2013; Alternative Investment Fund Managers Regulations 2013; Charities Act 2011 (Accounts and Audit) Order 2015; Enterprise and Regulatory Reform Act 2013 (Consequential Amendments) (Bankruptcy) and the Small Business, Enterprise and Employment Act 2015 (Consequential Amendments) Regulations 2016; Transfer of Functions (Elections, Referendums, Third Sector and Information) Order 2016; Bank of England and Financial Services (Consequential Amendments) Regulations 2017; Charitable Incorporated Organisations (Consequential Amendments) Order 2017; EEA Passport Rights (Amendment, etc., and Transitional Provisions) (EU Exit) Regulations 2018; Higher Education and Research Act 2017 (Further Implementation etc.) Regulations 2019; Civil Partnership (Opposite-sex Couples) Regulations 2019; Criminal Justice Act 2003 (Commencement No. 33) and Sentencing Act 2020 (Commencement No. 2) Regulations 2022; Judicial Review and Courts Act 2022 (Magistrates' Court Sentencing Powers) Regulations 2023; Social Housing (Regulation) Act 2023 (Consequential and Miscellaneous Amendments) Regulations 2024; Charities Acts 1992 and 2011 (Substitution of Sums) Order 2026

Status: Amended

History of passage through Parliament

Text of statute as originally enacted

Revised text of statute as amended

The Charities Act 2011 (c. 25) is an act of the Parliament of the United Kingdom that consolidated the bulk of the Charities Act 2006, outstanding provisions of the Charities Act 1993, and various other enactments.

== Repeals ==
Charities Act 1992 (Note: Section 79(1).)
- Act of Parliament
- Parliament of the United Kingdom
- Long title: An Act to amend the Charities Act 1960 and make other provision with respect to charities; to regulate fund-raising activities carried on in connection with charities and other institutions; to make fresh provision with respect to public charitable collections; and for connected purposes.
- Citation: 1992 c. 41
- Territorial extent: England and Wales; Scotland (in part); Northern Ireland (in part); (Note: Section 79(3)–(7).)

Dates
- Royal assent: 16 March 1992
- Commencement: Various (Note: Section 79(2).)
Other legislation
Amends	Charities Act 1960; Finance Act 1963; National Heritage Act 1983
Repeals/revokes	Police, Factories, & c. (Miscellaneous Provisions) Act 1916; House to House Collections Act 1939; War Charities Act 1940; Charities Act 1985
Amended by	Museums and Galleries Act 1992; Charities Act 2011

Status: Amended

Text of statute as originally enacted

Revised text of statute as amended

Charities Act 1993 (Substitution of Sums) Order 1995 (Note: Section 1(1).)
- Statutory Instrument
- Parliament of the United Kingdom
- Citation: SI 1995/2696
- Territorial extent: United Kingdom

Dates
- Made: 16 October 1995
- Laid before Parliament: 20 October 1995
- Commencement: 1 December 1995 (articles 1 and 2(1)–(2)); 1 March 1996 (rest of SI); (Note: Section 1(1)–(2).)
- Revoked: 14 March 2012
Other legislation
Made under	Charities Act 1993
Revoked by	Charities Act 2011

Status: Revoked

Text of statute as originally enacted

Charities Act 2006 (Charitable Companies Audit and Group Accounts Provisions) Order 2008
- Statutory Instrument
- Parliament of the United Kingdom
- Citation: SI 2008/527
- Territorial extent: England and Wales (Note: Section 1(5).)

Dates
- Made: 27 February 2008
- Commencement: 28 February 2008 (articles 1 and 3); 1 April 2008 (rest of SI)
- Revoked: 14 March 2012
Other legislation
Made under	Charities Act 2006
Revoked by	Charities Act 2011

Status: Revoked

Text of statute as originally enacted

Charities (Pre-consolidation Amendments) Order 2011 (Note: Section 1.)
- Statutory Instrument
- Parliament of the United Kingdom
- Citation: SI 2011/1396
- Territorial extent: United Kingdom

Dates
- Made: 2 June 2011
- Commencement: 14 March 2012
- Revoked: 14 March 2012
Other legislation
Amends	Rent Act 1977; Further and Higher Education Act 1992
Made under	Charities Act 2006
Revoked by	Charities Act 2011

Status: Revoked

Text of statute as originally enacted

Revised text of statute as amended

Legislation repealed or revoked in its entirety by the Charities Act 2011 included

- Recreational Charities Act 1958 (6 & 7 Eliz. 2. c. 17),
- Charities Act 1993,
- Charities (Amendment) Act 1995,
- Charities Act 1993 (Substitution of Sums) Order 1995 (SI 1995/2696),
- Charities Act 2006 (Charitable Companies Audit and Group Accounts Provisions) Order 2008 (SI 2008/527), and
- Charities (Pre-consolidation Amendments) Order 2011 (SI 2011/1396).

Amendments were made to other legislation. It replaced most of the Charities Act 1992 (c. 41) and Charities Act 2006 (c. 50).

== Independent examination ==
Section 145(1)(a) allowed for charities' financial accounts to be independently examined where a full audit is not required. An "independent examiner" is a person not connected to the charity who is "reasonably believed by the trustees to have the requisite ability and practical experience to carry out a competent examination of the accounts".

== Social investment by charities ==
Charities (Protection and Social Investment) Act 2016 (Note: Section 17(1).)
- Act of Parliament
- Parliament of the United Kingdom
- Long title: An Act to amend the Charities Act 1992 and the Charities Act 2011.
- Citation: 2016 c. 4
- Territorial extent: England and Wales (Note: Section 17(2).)

Dates
- Royal assent: 16 March 2016
- Commencement: Various (Note: Section 17(3)–(5).)
Other legislation
Amends	Charities Act 1992; Charities Act 2011
Amended by	Transfer of Functions (Elections, Referendums, Third Sector and Information) Order 2016

Status: Amended

Text of statute as originally enacted

Revised text of statute as amended

Additional provisions were added by the Charities (Protection and Social Investment) Act 2016 (c. 4) granting a "general power" to charities to make "social investments", that is actions undertaken both to further the organisation's charitable aims and to make a financial surplus. In this context a charity's actions do not need to be financial "investments" as the term would generally be understood.

=== Repealed enactments ===
Section 354(4) of the act provides that Schedule 10 contains repeals and revocations. The schedule lists 27 acts, one Church of England measure, and 21 statutory instruments.

Citation	Short title	Extent of repeal or revocation
Acts
6 & 7 Eliz. 2. c. 17	Recreational Charities Act 1958	The whole act.
1992 c. 41	Charities Act 1992	In Schedule 6, paragraphs 1, 3 to 8, 13(1) and (3) and 14 to 16.
1993 c. 10	Charities Act 1993	The whole act.
1993 c. 38	Welsh Language Act 1993	Sections 32 and 33.
1994 c. 19	Local Government (Wales) Act 1994	In Schedule 16, paragraph 101.
1994 c. 40	Deregulation and Contracting Out Act 1994	Section 29(1) to (6). Section 30. In Schedule 11, paragraph 12.
1995 c. 48	Charities (Amendment) Act 1995	The whole act.
1996 c. 47	Trusts of Land and Appointment of Trustees Act 1996	In Schedule 3, paragraph 26.
1996 c. 56	Education Act 1996	In Schedule 37, paragraphs 119 and 121.
1997 c. 44	Education Act 1997	In Schedule 7, paragraph 7.
1998 c. 11	Bank of England Act 1998	In Schedule 5, paragraph 42.
1998 c. 31	School Standards and Framework Act 1998	In Schedule 30, paragraph 49.
2000 c. 39	Insolvency Act 2000	In Schedule 4, paragraph 18.
2002 c. 9	Land Registration Act 2002	In Schedule 11, paragraph 29.
2003 c. 17	Licensing Act 2003	In section 16(3), the definition of "charity".
2004 c. 33	Civil Partnership Act 2004	In Schedule 21, paragraph 38. In Schedule 27, paragraph 147.
2006 c. 43	National Health Service (Consequential Provisions) Act 2006	In Schedule 1, paragraphs 160 to 162.
2006 c. 46	Companies Act 2006	Section 181(4). Section 226.
2006 c. 50	Charities Act 2006	Sections 1 to 9 and 11 to 44. In section 74, in subsection (4), paragraphs (a) and (b) and in paragraph (e) "76 or", in subsection (5) "(a), (b)," and subsection (6). Section 76. In section 78, in subsection (2), paragraph (a) and the words following paragraph (c), subsection (3) and, in subsection (4)(c), "6(5) or". In section 79(1), paragraph (a) and in paragraph (g) the words from "paragraph 104" to "paragraph 174(d)". In section 80 subsections (3)(a), (b) and (d) (but not the "and" following it), (4), (5)(a) to (c) and (e) (but not the "and" following it), (6) and (8) and in subsection (9) "also" and paragraph (a) (together with the "or" following it). Schedules 1, 2 and 4 to 7. In Schedule 8, paragraphs 1, 2, 6, 8, 13(4), 30, 33(3), 37(3), 39, 50 to 52, 54, 55, 57, 59, 61, 65, 69, 73, 77(3), 80(5)(d) (together with the "and" preceding it), (6) to (8), 83(3) and (4), 85 to 88, 90(4), 96 to 178, 180, 181(4) and (5), 191, 192(4), 193 to 195, 198, 199, 204 to 207, 210(b) (together with the "and" following it) and (c) and 212. In Schedule 10, paragraphs 1 to 14, 17 to 20, 23(a), (b) and (d) (together with the "or" preceding it), 24 and 26.
2007 c. 3	Income Tax Act 2007	In section 558, under the heading "Type 3", the word "or" preceding paragraph (b). In Schedule 1, paragraph 353.
2007 c. 15	Tribunals, Courts and Enforcement Act 2007	In Schedule 16, paragraph 7.
2007 c. 25	Further Education and Training Act 2007	In Schedule 1, paragraph 8.
2007 c. 28	Local Government and Public Involvement in Health Act 2007	In Schedule 9, paragraph 1(2)(i).
2008 c. 13	Regulatory Enforcement and Sanctions Act 2008	In Schedule 3, "Charities Act 1993 (c. 10), sections 76 to 78".
2009 c. 22	Apprenticeships, Skills, Children and Learning Act 2009	In Schedule 12, paragraph 8.
2010 c. 4	Corporation Tax Act 2010	In section 511, under the heading "Type 3", the word "or" preceding paragraph (b). In Schedule 1, paragraphs 273 to 275 and 491 to 493.
2010 c. 32	Academies Act 2010	Section 12(4).
Church Measures
2000 No. 1	Church of England (Miscellaneous Provisions) Measure 2000	Section 11.
Statutory instruments
SI 1994/1935	Companies Act 1985 (Audit Exemption) Regulations 1994	In Schedule 1, paragraphs 6 and 7.
SI 1995/2696	Charities Act 1993 (Substitution of Sums) Order 1995	The whole order.
SI 2001/3649	Financial Services and Markets Act 2000 (Consequential Amendments and Repeals) Order 2001	Article 339.
SI 2004/1941	Insolvency Act 2000 (Company Directors Disqualification Undertakings) Order 2004	In the Schedule, paragraph 5.
SI 2005/1074	Regulatory Reform (National Health Service Charitable and Non-Charitable Trust Accounts and Audit) Order 2005	Article 3.
SI 2005/3239	Qualifications, Curriculum and Assessment Authority for Wales (Transfer of Functions to the National Assembly for Wales and Abolition) Order 2005	In Schedule 1, paragraph 4.
SI 2006/242	Charities and Trustee Investment (Scotland) Act 2005 (Consequential Provisions and Modifications) Order 2006	In the Schedule, paragraph 6.
SI 2006/1722	Enterprise Act 2002 (Disqualification from Office: General) Order 2006	In Schedule 2, paragraph 4.
SI 2006/2951	Transfer of Functions (Third Sector, Communities and Equality) Order 2006	In the Schedule, paragraph 4.
SI 2007/2194	Companies Act 2006 (Commencement No. 3, Consequential Amendments, Transitional Provisions and Savings) Order 2007	In Schedule 4, paragraphs 78 to 82.
SI 2008/527	Charities Act 2006 (Charitable Companies Audit and Group Accounts Provisions) Order 2008	The whole order.
SI 2008/948	Companies Act 2006 (Consequential Amendments etc.) Order 2008	In Schedule 1, paragraphs 1(rr), 17 and 192. In Schedule 3, paragraphs 7 to 12.
SI 2009/508	Charities Acts 1992 and 1993 (Substitution of Sums) Order 2009	Articles 7 to 11.
SI 2009/1834	Transfer of Functions of the Charity Tribunal Order 2009	In Schedule 1, paragraphs 6 to 15.
SI 2009/1941	Companies Act 2006 (Consequential Amendments, Transitional Provisions and Savings) Order 2009	In Schedule 1, paragraph 139.
SI 2009/3348	Legal Services Act 2007 (Consequential Amendments) Order 2009	Article 4.
SI 2010/500	Charities Act 2006 (Changes in Exempt Charities) Order 2010	Article 2. In Schedule 1, paragraphs 3 and 4.
SI 2010/588	Income Tax Act 2007 (Amendment) Order 2010	Article 4.
SI 2010/866	Housing and Regeneration Act 2008 (Consequential Provisions) Order 2010	In Schedule 2, paragraph 78.
SI 2011/1396	Charities (Pre-consolidation Amendments) Order 2011	The whole order.
SI 2011/1725	Charities Act 2006 (Changes in Exempt Charities) Order 2011	Article 2. In the Schedule, paragraphs 1 to 4.

== Further amendments ==
The Charities Act 2022 introduced further changes to the Charities Act 2011. These included changes relating to failed appeals and cy-pres powers, provisions modifying the regime for amending the governing documents of some types of charity, and updating the law relating to ex gratis payments.

== See also ==
- English trust law
- Charitable trusts in English law

== Bibliography ==
- JE Martin, Hanbury & Martin: Modern Equity (19th edition, Sweet & Maxwell 2012) ch 15
