= Charities Act 2006 =

Act of the Parliament of the United Kingdom

Charities Act 2006 (Note: Section 80(1).)
- Act of Parliament
- Parliament of the United Kingdom
- Long title: An Act to provide for the establishment and functions of the Charity Commission for England and Wales and the Charity Tribunal; to make other amendments of the law about charities, including provision about charitable incorporated organisations; to make further provision about public charitable collections and other fund-raising carried on in connection with charities and other institutions; to make other provision about the funding of such institutions; and for connected purposes.
- Citation: 2006 c. 50
- Territorial extent: England and Wales; Scotland (in part); Northern Ireland (in part); (Note: Section 80(2)–(9).)

Dates
- Royal assent: 8 November 2006
- Commencement: Various (Note: Section 79.)
Other legislation
Amends	Local Government Act 1894; Open Spaces Act 1906; Landlord and Tenant Act 1927; Parochial Church Councils (Powers) Measure 1956; Recreational Charities Act 1958; Rates Act 1984; Housing Associations Act 1985; Coal Industry Act 1987; Courts and Legal Services Act 1990; Further and Higher Education Act 1992; Charities Act 1993; Constitutional Reform Act 2005; Equality Act 2006
Repeals/revokes	Charities Act 1960
Amended by	Charities Act 2011; Co-operative and Community Benefit Societies Act 2014; Sentencing Act 2020

Status: Amended

History of passage through Parliament

Text of statute as originally enacted

Revised text of statute as amended

The Charities Act 2006 (c. 50) is an act of the Parliament of the United Kingdom intended to alter the regulatory framework in which charities operate, partly by amending the Charities Act 1993. The act was mostly superseded by the Charities Act 2011, which consolidates charity law in the UK.

== Background ==
The root of the legal concept of charity was the preamble to the Charitable Uses Act 1601 which listed charitable purposes including the relief of the elderly, disabled and poor people, the maintenance of educational facilities and the repair of bridges.

== Provisions ==
The act contains three main provisions: definition of the requirements to qualify as a charity, the establishment of a Charity Tribunal to hear appeals from decisions of the Charity Commission, and alterations to the requirements for registering charities.

=== Charitable status ===
The act imposes conditions on bodies wishing to attain or maintain charitable status.

For the purposes of the law, a charitable organisation must pass a two-stage public benefit test. It must demonstrate that it serves the public interest, and that its purpose lies entirely in the promotion of one or more of the following causes:

- the prevention or relief of poverty;
- the advancement of education;
- the advancement of religion;
- the advancement of health or the saving of lives;
- the advancement of citizenship or community development;
- the advancement of the arts, culture, heritage or science;
- the advancement of amateur sport;
- the advancement of human rights, conflict resolution or reconciliation or the promotion of religious or racial harmony or equality and diversity;
- the advancement of environmental protection or improvement;
- the relief of those in need by reason of youth, age, ill-health, disability, financial hardship or other disadvantage;
- the advancement of animal welfare;
- the promotion of the efficiency of the armed forces of the Crown, or of the efficiency of the police, fire and rescue services or ambulance services;
- Any other purposes under ss4 of the 2006 act

Prior to 2008, the law assumed that advancement of education or religion were automatically in the public interest. A "public benefit" now needs to be demonstrated.

=== Charity Tribunal ===
The act established a "Charity Tribunal" to hear appeals from decisions of the Charity Commission, which previously lay only to the High Court. The tribunal was abolished in September 2009 and its functions transferred to the First-tier Tribunal.

=== Registration ===
The act raises the threshold above which registration is required with the Charity Commission from £1,000 to £5,000. This is intended to reduce administration costs for small charities. In addition, charities which fall under certain exempted categories under the 1993 act (such as certain Christian denominations) are now only exempted if their gross annual income is less than £100,000.

== Reception ==
The legislation was supported by the charitable sector.

== See also ==
- Exempt charity
- English trusts law
