= Charities Act 1993 =

Act of the Parliament of the United Kingdom

Charities Act 1993 (Note: Section 100(1).)
- Act of Parliament
- Parliament of the United Kingdom
- Long title: An Act to consolidate the Charitable Trustees Incorporation Act 1872 and, except for certain spent or transitional provisions, the Charities Act 1960 and Part I of the Charities Act 1992.
- Citation: 1993 c. 10
- Territorial extent: England and Wales (Note: Section 100(2). Certain provisions extend also to Scotland (section 100(5)), Northern Ireland (section 100(4)), or the whole of the United Kingdom (section 100(3)).)

Dates
- Royal assent: 27 May 1993
- Commencement: 1 August 1993 (main provisions) (Note: Section 99(1).); 1 March 1996 (Part VI, section 69 and paragraph 21(3) of schedule 6) (Note: Section 99(2). The Charities Act 1993 (Commencement and Transitional Provisions) Order 1995 (SI 1995/2695).)
- Repealed: 14 March 2012
Other legislation
Amends	Rates Act 1984; See § Repealed enactments
Repeals/revokes	See § Repealed enactments
Amended by	Statute Law (Repeals) Act 1993; Education Act 1996; Land Registration Act 2002; Statute Law (Repeals) Act 2004; National Health Service (Consequential Provisions) Act 2006
Repealed by	Charities Act 2011

Status: Repealed

Text of statute as originally enacted

Revised text of statute as amended

The Charities Act 1993 (c. 10) was an act of the Parliament of the United Kingdom that consolidated enactments related to charities in England and Wales.

== Provisions ==
=== Repealed enactments ===
Section 98(2) of the act repealed 22 enactments, listed in schedule 7 to the act.

Citation	Short title	Extent of repeal
35 & 36 Vict. c. 24	Charitable Trustees Incorporation Act 1872	The whole Act so far as unrepealed.
10 & 11 Geo. 5. c. 16	Imperial War Museum Act 1920	Section 5.
24 & 25 Geo. 5. c. 43	National Maritime Museum Act 1934	Section 7.
8 & 9 Eliz. 2. c. 58	Charities Act 1960	The whole Act so far as unrepealed except—section 28(9), section 35(6), section 38(3) to (5), section 39(2), sections 48 and 49, Schedule 6.
1963 c. 33	London Government Act 1963	Section 81(9)(b) and (c).
1963 c. xi	Universities of Durham and Newcastle-upon-Tyne Act 1963	Section 10.
1965 c. 17	Museum of London Act 1965	Section 11.
1972 c. 54	British Library Act 1972	Section 4(2).
1972 c. 70	Local Government Act 1972	Section 210(9).
1973 c. 16	Education Act 1973	In section 2(7) the words from "but" onwards.
1973 c. 16	Education Act 1973	In Schedule 1, paragraph 1(1) and (3).
1976 No. 4	Endowments and Glebe Measure 1976	Section 44.
1983 c. 47	National Heritage Act 1983	In Schedule 5, paragraph 4.
1985 c. 9	Companies Consolidation (Consequential Provisions) Act 1985	In Schedule 2 the entry relating to the Charities Act 1960.
1985 c. 20	Charities Act 1985	Section 1.
1986 c. 60	Financial Services Act 1986	In Schedule 16, paragraph 1.
1988 c. 40	Education Reform Act 1988	In Schedule 12, paragraphs 9, 10, 63 and 64.
1989 c. 40	Companies Act 1989	Section 111.
1989 c. xiii	Queen Mary and Westfield College Act 1989	Section 10.
1990 c. 41	Courts and Legal Services Act 1990	In Schedule 10, paragraph 14.
1992 c. 13	Further and Higher Education Act 1992	In Schedule 8, paragraph 69.
1992 c. 41	Charities Act 1992	The whole of Part I except—section 1(1) and (4), sections 29 and 30, section 36, sections 49 and 50.
1992 c. 41	Charities Act 1992	Section 75(b).
1992 c. 41	Charities Act 1992	Section 76(1)(a).
1992 c. 41	Charities Act 1992	In section 77, subsections (2)(a), (b) and (c) and in subsection (4) the figures 20, 22 and 23.
1992 c. 41	Charities Act 1992	Section 79(4) and (5).
1992 c. 41	Charities Act 1992	Schedules 1 to 4.
1992 c. 41	Charities Act 1992	In Schedule 6, paragraph 13(2).
1992 c. 41	Charities Act 1992	In Schedule 7, the entries relating to section 8 of the Charities Act 1960 and (so far as not in force at the date specified in section 99(1) of this Act) the Charities Act 1985.
1992 c. 44	Museums and Galleries Act 1992	In Schedule 8, paragraphs 4 and 10.
1992 c. 44	Museums and Galleries Act 1992	In Schedule 9, the entry relating to the Charities Act 1960.

== Subsequent developments ==
Charities (Amendment) Act 1995 (Note: Section 2(1).)
- Act of Parliament
- Parliament of the United Kingdom
- Long title: An Act to make provision for the treatment of two or more charities as a single charity for all or any of the purposes of the Charities Act 1993.
- Citation: 1995 c. 48
- Territorial extent: England and Wales (Note: Section 2(2).)

Dates
- Royal assent: 8 November 1995
- Commencement: 8 November 1995 (Note: Section 4(b) of the Interpretation Act 1978.)
- Repealed: 14 March 2012
Other legislation
Amends	Charities Act 1993
Amended by	National Lottery etc. Act 1993; Trusts of Land and Appointment of Trustees Act 1996; National Lottery Act 2006; Academies Act 2010
Repealed by	Charities Act 2011

Status: Repealed

Text of statute as originally enacted

Revised text of statute as amended

Text of the Charities (Amendment) Act 1995 as in force today (including any amendments) within the United Kingdom, from legislation.gov.uk.

The act was amended by the Charities (Amendment) Act 1995 (c. 48).

The whole act was repealed by section 354(4) of, and schedule 10 to, the Charities Act 2011, which came into force on 14 March 2012.
