= Regulatory Reform (Scotland) Act 2014 =

Act of the Scottish Parliament

Regulatory Reform (Scotland) Act 2014 (Note: Section 62.)
- Act of the Scottish Parliament
- Scottish Parliament
- Long title: An Act of the Scottish Parliament to enable provision to be made for the purpose of promoting regulatory consistency; to make provision in relation to primary authorities; to enable provision to be made, and to make provision, as respects regulatory activities, and offences, relating to the environment; to make provision about regulatory functions relating to marine licensing, planning and street traders’ licences; and for connected purposes.
- Citation: 2014 asp 3
- Introduced by: John Swinney MSP
- Territorial extent: Scotland

Dates
- Royal assent: 19 February 2014
- Commencement: 20 February 2014 (in part) (Note: Section 61.)

Other legislation
- Amends: 31 acts: Scottish Board of Health Act 1919; Sewerage (Scotland) Act 1968; Prevention of Oil Pollution Act 1971; Local Government (Scotland) Act 1973; Control of Pollution Act 1974; Local Government, Planning and Land Act 1980; Litter Act 1983; Water Act 1989; Environmental Protection Act 1990; Planning (Consequential Provisions) Act 1990; Agricultural Holdings (Scotland) Act 1991; Natural Heritage (Scotland) Act 1991; Clean Air Act 1993; Radioactive Substances Act 1993; Local Government etc. (Scotland) Act 1994; Criminal Procedure (Scotland) Act 1995; Environment Act 1995; Merchant Shipping Act 1995; Crime and Punishment (Scotland) Act 1997; Planning (Consequential Provisions) (Scotland) Act 1997; Town and Country Planning (Scotland) Act 1997; City of Edinburgh (Guided Busways) Order Confirmation Act 1998; Pollution Prevention and Control Act 1999; Water Industry (Scotland) Act 2002; Water Environment and Water Services (Scotland) Act 2003; Antisocial Behaviour etc. (Scotland) Act 2004; Water Services etc. (Scotland) Act 2005; Flood Risk Management (Scotland) Act 2009; Forth Crossing Act 2011; Reservoirs (Scotland) Act 2011; Water Resources (Scotland) Act 2013

Status: Current legislation

History of passage through the Parliament

Text of statute as originally enacted

Revised text of statute as amended

The Regulatory Reform (Scotland) Act 2014 (asp 3) is an act of the Scottish Parliament, introduced to the legislature in 2013, and became law after receiving Royal Assent on 19 February 2014. It sought to improve the regulation of businesses requiring certain environmental permits within Scotland whilst strengthening existing protections of the environment.

== History ==
John Swinney MSP introduced the Regulatory Reform (Scotland) Bill to Parliament on 27 March 2013, supported by Paul Wheelhouse MSP and Fergus Ewing MSP. It passed through the various stages in Parliament between November 2013 and January 2014 and received Royal Assent on 19 February 2014, with Part 5 of the Act (excluding section 57) coming into force the following day. The legislation allowed for the remainder of the Act to come into force on a future date at the will of the Scottish Ministers. The Act arose from recommendations made to the Government by the Environmental Crime Task Force.

== Regulatory changes ==
The Act attempts to make it easier for businesses to apply for certain permits and licences in Scotland, while strengthening environmental regulations to protect the country's natural heritage. Businesses will be able to apply for a single permit for a site where several would have been required previously. In addition, it gives courts additional sentencing powers in relation to environmental crime and give the Scottish Environment Protection Agency more powers to enforce laws. A new criminal offence of causing environmental harm has also been created.

== See also ==
- Environmental crime
- Scottish Environment Protection Agency
