= List of acts of the Scottish Parliament from 2003 =

This is a list of acts of the Scottish Parliament passed in 2003. Acts of the Scottish Parliament are enacted by the Scottish Parliament, which has legislative authority over devolved matters in relation to Scotland under the authority of the Scotland Act 1998. Acts are cited by calendar year, in the same fashion as acts of Parliament of the United Kingdom. Each act passed in a respective year is numbered consecutively with Arabic numerals, following the prefix "asp".

19 acts of the Scottish Parliament were passed in 2003.

indicates that an act has been transcribed on Wikisource, indicates that an act is available to view at legislation.gov.uk, and indicates the location of the original act in the Parliamentary Archives.

== Acts of the Scottish Parliament ==
Short title	Citation	Royal assent
Long title
Local Government in Scotland Act 2003	2003 asp 1	11 February 2003
An Act of the Scottish Parliament to provide anew about the way in which local authorities discharge their functions and about the local provision of certain public services; to give local authorities power to do things which they consider will advance well-being; to provide exemptions and reliefs from non-domestic rates in relation to certain lands and heritages; to confer power on the Scottish Ministers to combine certain lands and heritages for the purposes of assessing rateable value; to require local authorities to prepare, and endeavour to implement, a plan relating to the carrying out of their waste disposal and collection functions; to make new provision about the capital expenditure of those authorities and about the making of capital grants to them; to make some miscellaneous provisions connected with the functions of local authorities; and for connected purposes.
Land Reform (Scotland) Act 2003	2003 asp 2	25 February 2003
An Act of the Scottish Parliament to establish statutory public rights of access to land for recreational and other purposes, and to extend some of the provisions for that purpose to rights of way and other rights; to make provision under which bodies representing rural and crofting communities may buy the land with which those communities have a connection; and for connected purposes.
Water Environment and Water Services (Scotland) Act 2003	2003 asp 3	5 March 2003
An Act of the Scottish Parliament to make provision for protection of the water environment, including provision for implementing European Parliament and Council Directive 2000/60/EC; (Note: Water Framework Directive (2000/60/EC)) to amend the Sewerage (Scotland) Act 1968 (Note: Sewerage (Scotland) Act 1968 (c. 47)) and the Water (Scotland) Act 1980 (Note: Water (Scotland) Act 1980 (c. 45)) in relation to the provision of water and sewerage services; and for connected purposes.
Public Appointments and Public Bodies etc. (Scotland) Act 2003	2003 asp 4	11 March 2003
An Act of the Scottish Parliament to establish the office of Commissioner for Public Appointments in Scotland; to make provision in respect of appointments to certain public bodies; to dissolve certain public bodies; to make provision as to certain functions of Health Boards and National Health Service trusts; to make provision as to the functions of the Law Society of Scotland and the Scottish Solicitors' Discipline Tribunal regarding the regulation of conveyancing and executry practitioners and the provision of services by such practitioners; to make modifications in relation to those services, including conferring certain notarial and other functions on such practitioners; to establish the Historic Environment Advisory Council for Scotland; and for connected purposes.
Protection of Children (Scotland) Act 2003	2003 asp 5	19 March 2003
An Act of the Scottish Parliament to require the Scottish Ministers to keep a list of individuals whom they consider to be unsuitable to work with children; to prohibit individuals included in the list, and individuals who are similarly regarded in other jurisdictions, from doing certain work relating to children; to make further provision in relation to that list; and for connected purposes.
Budget (Scotland) Act 2003	2003 asp 6	19 March 2003
An Act of the Scottish Parliament to make provision, for financial year 2003/04, for the use of resources by the Scottish Administration and certain bodies whose expenditure is payable out of the Scottish Consolidated Fund, for authorising the payment of sums out of the Fund, for the maximum amount of relevant expenditure for the purposes of section 94(5) of the Local Government (Scotland) Act 1973 (Note: Local Government (Scotland) Act 1973 (c. 65)) (c.65) and the maximum amounts of borrowing by certain statutory bodies; to make provision, for financial year 2004/05, for authorising the payment of sums out of the Fund on a temporary basis; to amend section 3 of, and schedule 1 to, the Budget (Scotland) Act 2001 (Note: Budget (Scotland) Act 2001 (asp 4)) (asp 4); and for connected purposes.
Criminal Justice (Scotland) Act 2003	2003 asp 7	26 March 2003
An Act of the Scottish Parliament to make provision in relation to criminal justice, criminal procedure and evidence in criminal proceedings; to make provision as to the arrest, sentencing, custody and release of offenders and the obtaining of reports in relation to offenders; to make provision for the provision of assistance by local authorities to persons who are arrested and are in police custody or who are subject to a deferred sentence and for the making of grants to local authorities exercising jointly certain functions in relation to offenders and other persons; to make provision for the protection of the public at large from persons with a propensity to commit certain offences and for the establishment of the Risk Management Authority; to make provision for the granting of certain rights to the victims of crime; to make provision as to the jurisdiction of courts and the designation of certain courts as drugs courts; to make provision in relation to the physical punishment of children; to create offences in connection with traffic in prostitution or for purposes connected with pornography; to make provision as to the criminal law as it relates to bribery and the acceptance of bribes; to make provision in relation to criminal legal assistance; to require the aggravation of an offence by religious prejudice to be taken into account in sentencing; to make provision as respects police ranks and the powers and duties of certain civilians employed by police authorities; to make provision for the disqualification of convicted persons from jury service in both criminal and civil proceedings and for the separation of juries after retiral; to make provision for the use of live television links between prisons and courts; to make provision in relation to warrants to search; to amend Part V of the Police Act 1997 (Note: Police Act 1997 (c. 50)) in its application to Scotland; to make provision in relation to the prohibition of certain matters in respect of cases referred to the Principal Reporter; to amend the law relating to penalties for wildlife offences; and for connected purposes.
Building (Scotland) Act 2003	2003 asp 8	26 March 2003
An Act of the Scottish Parliament to make further provision with respect to buildings, building standards, work in relation to buildings and related matters; and for connected purposes.
Title Conditions (Scotland) Act 2003	2003 asp 9	3 April 2003
An Act of the Scottish Parliament to make further provision as respects real burdens, servitudes and certain other obligations affecting land; to amend the law relating to the ranking of standard securities; and for connected purposes.
Homelessness etc. (Scotland) Act 2003	2003 asp 10	9 April 2003
An Act of the Scottish Parliament to make further provision about homelessness; to provide for the giving of notice to local authorities of proceedings for possession and enforcement of standard securities; to amend section 18 of the Housing (Scotland) Act 1988 (Note: Housing (Scotland) Act 1988 (c. 43)) in relation to recovery of possession of assured tenancies for non-payment of rent; and for connected purposes.
Agricultural Holdings (Scotland) Act 2003	2003 asp 11	22 April 2003
An Act of the Scottish Parliament to amend the law relating to agricultural holdings under the Agricultural Holdings (Scotland) Act 1991; (Note: Agricultural Holdings (Scotland) Act 1991 (c. 55)) to provide for new forms of agricultural tenancies and to make provision in relation to these tenancies; to provide for the right of certain agricultural tenants to buy land; to provide for the use of certain agricultural land for non-agricultural purposes; to make special provision for certain agricultural tenancies where the tenant is a partnership; to make new provision for the resolution of disputes between landlords and tenants arising under agricultural tenancies; and for connected purposes.
Dog Fouling (Scotland) Act 2003	2003 asp 12	22 April 2003
An Act of the Scottish Parliament to make provision in relation to the offence of dog fouling, including fixed penalty notices for such an offence; and for connected purposes.
Mental Health (Care and Treatment) (Scotland) Act 2003	2003 asp 13	25 April 2003
An Act of the Scottish Parliament to restate and amend the law relating to mentally disordered persons; and for connected purposes.
Council of the Law Society of Scotland Act 2003	2003 asp 14	1 May 2003
An Act of the Scottish Parliament to make provision about the discharge of functions of the Council of the Law Society of Scotland and the appointment and constitution of committees and sub-committees of that Council.
Salmon and Freshwater Fisheries (Consolidation) (Scotland) Act 2003	2003 asp 15	1 May 2003
An Act of the Scottish Parliament to consolidate, with amendments recommended by the Scottish Law Commission, the enactments relating to salmon and freshwater fisheries in Scotland.
National Galleries of Scotland Act 2003	2003 asp 16	1 May 2003
An Act of the Scottish Parliament to provide for a certain piece of land to cease to form part of Princes Street Gardens and to disapply the effect of section 22 of the Schedule to the City of Edinburgh District Council Order Confirmation Act 1991 (Note: City of Edinburgh District Council Order Confirmation Act 1991 (c. xix)) to that land.
Commissioner for Children and Young People (Scotland) Act 2003	2003 asp 17	1 May 2003
An Act of the Scottish Parliament to provide for the establishment and functions of a Commissioner for Children and Young People in Scotland; and for connected purposes.
Education (School Meals) (Scotland) Act 2003	2003 asp 18	7 July 2003
An Act of the Scottish Parliament to confer powers on the Scottish Ministers to prescribe circumstances in which education authorities are obliged to ensure that provision is made for pupils to receive milk, meals or other refreshments free of charge; and to provide that the first exercise of those powers has retrospective effect.
Robin Rigg Offshore Wind Farm (Navigation and Fishing) (Scotland) Act 2003	2003 asp 19	1 August 2003
An Act of the Scottish Parliament to regulate matters relating to navigation and fishing in connection with the provision of an offshore wind farm in navigable waters within the Solway Firth; and for connected purposes.

== See also ==
- List of acts of the Scottish Parliament
