= Clean Air Act 1993 =

Act of the Parliament of the United Kingdom

Clean Air Act 1993 (Note: Section 68(1).)
- Act of Parliament
- Parliament of the United Kingdom
- Long title: An Act to consolidate the Clean Air Acts 1956 and 1968 and certain related enactments, with amendments to give effect to recommendations of the Law Commission and the Scottish Law Commission.
- Citation: 1993 c. 11
- Territorial extent: England and Wales; Scotland; Northern Ireland (in part); (Note: Section 68(3).)

Dates
- Royal assent: 27 May 1993
- Commencement: 27 August 1993 (Note: Section 68(2).)
Other legislation
Amends	See § Repealed enactments
Repeals/revokes	See § Repealed enactments
Amended by	Statute Law (Repeals) Act 1993; Local Government (Wales) Act 1994; Local Government etc. (Scotland) Act 1994; Merchant Shipping Act 1995; Environment Act 1995; Statute Law (Repeals) Act 1998; Pollution Prevention and Control Act 1999; Adults with Incapacity (Scotland) Act 2000; Building (Scotland) Act 2003; Statute Law (Repeals) Act 2004; Housing (Scotland) Act 2006; Environmental Permitting (England and Wales) Regulations 2007; Public Health etc. (Scotland) Act 2008; Environmental Permitting (England and Wales) (Amendment) Regulations 2009; Environmental Permitting (England and Wales) Regulations 2010; Natural Resources Body for Wales (Functions) Order 2013; Regulatory Reform (Scotland) Act 2014; Consumer Rights Act 2015; Deregulation Act 2015; Legal Aid, Sentencing and Punishment of Offenders Act 2012 (Fines on Summary Conviction) Regulations 2015; Environmental Permitting (England and Wales) Regulations 2016; Environmental Authorisations (Scotland) Regulations 2018; Environment Act 2021; Building Safety Act 2022 (Consequential Amendments etc.) Regulations 2023; Environment (Air Quality and Soundscapes) (Wales) Act 2024; Building Safety Act 2022 (Consequential Amendments) (Wales) Regulations 2026

Status: Amended

Text of statute as originally enacted

Revised text of statute as amended

Text of the Clean Air Act 1993 as in force today (including any amendments) within the United Kingdom, from legislation.gov.uk.

The Clean Air Act 1993 (c. 11) is an act of the Parliament of the United Kingdom that consolidated enactments relating to clean air in England and Wales and Scotland.

== Provisions ==
=== Repealed enactments ===
Section 67(3) of the act repealed 15 enactments, listed in schedule 6 to the act.

Citation	Short title	Extent of repeal
4 & 5 Eliz. 2. c. 52	Clean Air Act 1956	The whole act.
1963 c. 33	London Government Act 1963	Section 40(4)(e).
1963 c. 33	London Government Act 1963	In Schedule 11, paragraphs 30 and 31.
1964 c. 56	Housing Act 1964	Section 95.
1968 c. 62	Clean Air Act 1968	The whole act.
1970 c. 38	Building (Scotland) Act 1970	In Schedule 1, paragraph 5.
1972 c. 70	Local Government Act 1972	Section 180(3)(f).
1973 c. 65	Local Government (Scotland) Act 1973	In Schedule 15, paragraph 28.
1973 c. 65	Local Government (Scotland) Act 1973	In Schedule 27, paragraph 128.
1974 c. 39	Consumer Credit Act 1974	In Schedule 4, paragraphs 15 and 16.
1974 c. 40	Control of Pollution Act 1974	Sections 75 to 84.
1974 c. 40	Control of Pollution Act 1974	Section 103.
1974 c. 40	Control of Pollution Act 1974	In section 109(3), the words "75, 77".
1974 c. 40	Control of Pollution Act 1974	In Schedule 2, paragraphs 19, 26 and 27.
1974 c. 40	Control of Pollution Act 1974	In Schedule 3, paragraph 16.
1980 c. 65	Local Government, Planning and Land Act 1980	Section 189.
1980 c. 65	Local Government, Planning and Land Act 1980	In Schedule 2, paragraphs 1 to 6 and 16.
1984 c. 55	Building Act 1984	In Schedule 5, paragraph 2.
1984 c. 55	Building Act 1984	In Schedule 6, paragraph 5.
1987 c. 26	Housing (Scotland) Act 1987	In Schedule 23, paragraphs 6 and 14.
1989 c. 17	Control of Smoke Pollution Act 1989	The whole act.
1990 c. 43	Environmental Protection Act 1990	Section 85.
1990 c. 43	Environmental Protection Act 1990	In Schedule 15, paragraphs 6, 7, 12 and 15(6) to (9).
1991 c. 46	Atomic Weapons Establishment Act 1991	In the Schedule, paragraphs 4 and 8(1).

== Subsequent developments ==
The act has been amended on multiple occasions. The Local Government (Wales) Act 1994 and Local Government etc. (Scotland) Act 1994 made consequential amendments following local government reorganisation in Wales and Scotland. The Environment Act 1995 made further amendments, and the Pollution Prevention and Control Act 1999 amended the act in connection with the introduction of the pollution prevention and control regime.

The Environment Act 2021 made extensive amendments to the act by virtue of Schedule 12, inserting new provisions on smoke control areas and strengthening the regime for England. The Environment (Air Quality and Soundscapes) (Wales) Act 2024 subsequently made corresponding and additional amendments for Wales, including repealing sections 20 to 23 and inserting new provisions specific to Wales.
