= Fiars =

Fiars may relate to:

- Fiar, in Scots law, owner in fee simple of a property subject to a liferent
- Fiars Prices, in Scottish history, prices of grain fixed by the sheriff

== See also ==
- FIAR, Italian avionics and radar manufacturer
- Friar, member of a Christian mendicant order
