= Water (Scotland) Act 1967 =

Act of the Parliament of the United Kingdom

Water (Scotland) Act 1967 (Note: Section 36(1).)
- Act of Parliament
- Parliament of the United Kingdom
- Long title: An Act to provide for the establishment of regional water boards and a Central Scotland Water Development Board, and the transfer to those boards of functions in relation to water supply in Scotland previously exercisable by local water authorities, to confer on the Central Scotland Water Development Board functions in relation to the bulk supply of water to their constituent regional water boards, to enable other regional water boards and water development boards to be established by order of the Secretary of State, to amend the Water (Scotland) Acts 1946 and 1949; and for purposes connected with the matters aforesaid.
- Citation: 1967 c. 78
- Territorial extent: Scotland (Note: Section 36(2).)

Dates
- Royal assent: 27 July 1967
- Commencement: 27 July 1967 (Note: The Acts of Parliament (Commencement) Act 1793.)
- Repealed: 1 April 1996 (Note: The Local Government etc. (Scotland) Act 1994 (Commencement No.7 and Savings) Order 1996 (SI 1996/323).)
Other legislation
Amended by	Statute Law (Repeals) Act 1977; Water (Scotland) Act 1980
Repealed by	Local Government etc. (Scotland) Act 1994

Status: Repealed

Text of statute as originally enacted

Revised text of statute as amended

The Water (Scotland) Act 1967 (c. 78) was an act of the Parliament of the United Kingdom that reorganised the water supply industry in Scotland, by creating regional water boards to manage the treatment and supply of water to consumers, and a Central Scotland Water Development Board, which was responsible for developing new sources of water, and supplying that water to the regional water boards in bulk.

== Background ==
In 1945, there were 210 separate water authorities in Scotland, and no statutory requirement that communities should be supplied with a drinkable water supply. This changed when the Water (Scotland) Act 1946 (9 & 10 Geo. 6. c. 42) was passed by the UK government, which mandated local authorities to provide such a supply.

== Legislation ==
The act was the first major attempt to consolidate the large numbers of small water authorities into larger units. 13 regional water boards were created, which were independent of the local government structures, although the members of the Board were always drawn from the local authorities which they served. They were responsible for water supply only, and the disposal and treatment of sewage would remain fragmented for some years yet. On a technical level, the new structures worked well, but their finance had not been thought through, and were less than satisfactory. Central government controlled the finances through local government. The Scottish Office was responsible for supervising the new boards, but the setting of tariffs and charges was still handled by local authorities.

The act also recognised that, as requirements for water continued to increase, even regional water boards would struggle to finance the provision of new sources of water, and so the Central Scotland Water Development Board was set up, with a mandate to develop new sources of supply, and to sell such water to the Boards within their area. This included the Water Boards for Borders, Central, Fife, Strathclyde, Tayside, and Lothian which included Edinburgh, and accounted for 86 per cent of the Scottish population.

With the passing of the Local Government (Scotland) Act 1973, larger regions were created, and responsibility for water supply passed from the regional water boards to the nine regional councils of Highland, Grampian, Tayside, Fife, Lothian, Borders, Central, Strathclyde, and Dumfries and Galloway. A tenth Island Area included Shetland, Orkney and the Western Isles, although they continued to act independently. The regional councils were also given responsibility for sewage treatment, which prior to that time had been handled by 234 separate organisations. The 1967 act remained in force until it was repealed from 1 April 1996, as a result of the passing of the Local Government etc. (Scotland) Act 1994.

=== Boards ===
A total of 13 regional water boards were created, taking over responsibility for water supply from existing county councils, town councils, corporations, district water boards, and joint water committees. The boards were as follows.

Water boards established by the act
Water board	Type of authority	Authority taken over
Argyll Water Board	County council	Argyll
Argyll Water Board	Town Council	Campbeltown, Dunoon, Inveraray, Lochgilphead, Oban, Tobermory
Ayrshire and Bute Water Board	County council	Ayr, Bute
Ayrshire and Bute Water Board	Town council	Ardrossan, Ayr, Cumnock and Holmhead, Darvel, Galston, Girvan, Kilmarnock, Largs, Maybole, Millport, Newmilns and Greenholm, Prestwick, Rothesay, Troon
Ayrshire and Bute Water Board	Company	Irvine and District Water Board
East of Scotland Water Board	County council	Angus, part of Kincardine, Perth
East of Scotland Water Board	Corporation	Dundee
East of Scotland Water Board	Town council	Aberfeldy, Abernethy, Alyth, Arbroath, Auchterarder, Brechin, Callander, Coupar Angus, Crieff, Doune, Dunblane, Forfar, Inverbervie, Kirriemuir, Laurencekirk, Montrose, Perth, Pitlochry, Stonehaven
East of Scotland Water Board	Company	Blairgowrie Rattray and District Water Board, Loch Lee Water Board
Fife and Kinross Water Board	County council	Fife, Kinross
Fife and Kinross Water Board	Town council	Auchtermuchty, Burntisland, Cowdenbeath, Cupar, Dunfermline, Elie and Earlsferry, Falkland, Inverkeithing, Kilrenny Anstruther Easter and Anstruther Wester, Kinghorn, Kinross, Kirkcaldy, Leslie, Leven, Newburgh, Pittenweem, St Andrews, St Monace
Fife and Kinross Water Board	Company	Elie Earlsferry and St. Monance Joint Water Committee, Pittenweem Kilrenny and Anstruther Joint Water Committee
Inverness-shire Water Board	County council	Inverness
Inverness-shire Water Board	Town council	Fort William, Inverness, Kingussie
Lanarkshire Water Board	County council	part of Lanark
Lanarkshire Water Board	Town council	Biggar, Hamilton, Lanark, Motherwell and Wishaw
Lanarkshire Water Board	Company	Airdrie Coatbridge and District Water Board, Daer Water Board
Lower Clyde Water Board	County council	part of Dumbarton, part of Lanark, Renfrew
Lower Clyde Water Board	Corporation	Glasgow
Lower Clyde Water Board	Town council	Cove and Kilcreggan, Gourock, Greenock, Helensburgh, Milngavie, Paisley, Port Glasgow
Lower Clyde Water Board	Company	Clydebank and District Water Trust
Mid-Scotland Water Board	County council	Clackmannan, part of Dunbarton, Stirling
Mid-Scotland Water Board	Town council	Alloa, Alva, Bridge of Allan, Denny and Dunipace, Dollar, Grangemouth, Kilsyth, Kirkintilloch, Stirling, Tillicoultry
Mid-Scotland Water Board	Company	Stirlingshire and Falkirk Water Board, part of West Lothian Water Board
North of Scotland Water Board	County council	Caithness, Orkney, Sutherland, Zetland
North of Scotland Water Board	Town council	Dornoch, Kirkwall, Lerwick, Stromness, Thurso, Wick
North-East of Scotland Water Board	County council	Aberdeen, Banffl, part of Kincardine, Moray, Nairn
North-East of Scotland Water Board	Corporation	Aberdeen
North-East of Scotland Water Board	Town council	Aberchirder, Aberlour, Ballater, Banchory, Banff, Buckie, Cullen, Dufftown, Ellon, Findochty, Forres, Fraserburgh, Grantown-on-Spey, Huntly, Inverurie, Keith, Kintore, Macduff, Nairn, Oldmeldrum, Peterhead, Portknockie, Portsoy, Rosehearty, Rothes, Turriff
North-East of Scotland Water Board	Company	Buckie and Portknockie Joint Water Committee, Laich of Moray Water Board, Lower Deveron Water Board, Nairn Joint Water Board
Ross and Cromarty Water Board	County council	Aberdeen, Banffl, part of Kincardine, Moray, Nairn
Ross and Cromarty Water Board	Town council	Cromarty, Dingwall, Fortrose, Invergordon, Stornoway, Tain
South-East of Scotland Water Board	County council	Peebles, Roxburgh, Selkirk
South-East of Scotland Water Board	Corporation	Edinburgh
South-East of Scotland Water Board	Town council	Berwick, Bo'ness, Coldstream, Duns, Eyemouth, Galashiels, Hawick, Innerleithen, Jedburgh, Kelso, Lauder, Melrose, Peebles, Selkirk
South-East of Scotland Water Board	Company	East Lothian Water Board, part of West Lothian Water Board
South-West of Scotland Water Board	County council	Dumfries, Kirkcudbright, Wigtown
South-West of Scotland Water Board	Town council	Annan, Castle Douglas, Dalbeattie, Dumfries, Gatehouse, Kirkcudbright, Langholm, Lochmaben, Lockerbie, Moffat, New Galloway, Newton Stewart, Sanquhar, Stranraer, Whithorn, Wigtown

Joint water boards were a result of the Water Act 1945. This had encouraged the amalgamation of the water supply works from adjacent local authorities, so that water supply could be improved. Each board consisted of members appointed by local councils, who had expert knowledge of engineering or finance.

== Bibliography ==
- Lobina, Emanuele; Terhorst, Philipp (29 January 2005). D19: WaterTime case study - Edinburgh, UK. Watertime EU Research Project.
- Matthews, Hugh; Gardiner, Vince (1999). The Changing Geography of the UK (3rd ed.). Routledge. ISBN 978-0-415-17901-0.
- Ofwat (2006). "The Development of the Water Industry in England and Wales" (PDF). www.ofwat.gov.uk.
- Parliament (1967). "Water (Scotland) Act 1967" (PDF). www.legislation.gov.uk.
- SRM (2008). "Structure of the UK Water Industry". Water Research Centre. Archived from the original on 3 May 2017.
