= Prevention of Damage by Pests Act 1949 =

Act of the Parliament of the United Kingdom

Prevention of Damage by Pests Act 1949 (Note: Section 30(1).)
- Act of Parliament
- Parliament of the United Kingdom
- Long title: An Act to re-enact with modifications the Rats and Mice (Destruction) Act, 1919; to make permanent provision for preventing loss of food by infestation; and for purposes connected therewith.
- Citation: 12, 13 & 14 Geo. 6. c. 55
- Territorial extent: England and Wales; Scotland; Northern Ireland (section 23); (Note: Section 29.)

Dates
- Royal assent: 30 July 1949
- Commencement: 31 March 1950 (Note: Section 30(3).)

Other legislation
- Repeals/revokes: Rats and Mice (Destruction) Act 1919
- Amended by: Pests Act 1954; Transfer of Functions (Ministry of Food) Order 1955; Local Government Act 1958; Local Government and Miscellaneous Financial Provisions (Scotland) Act 1958; London Government Act 1963; Courts Act 1971; Agriculture (Miscellaneous Provisions) Act 1972; Local Government Act 1972; Northern Ireland Constitution Act 1973; Local Government (Scotland) Act 1973; Local Government Act 1974; Criminal Procedure (Scotland) Act 1975; Local Government (Miscellaneous Provisions) Act 1976; Interpretation Act 1978; Water (Scotland) Act 1980; Local Government, Planning and Land Act 1980; Criminal Justice Act 1982; Courts Act 2003; Statute Law (Repeals) Act 2004; Public Health etc. (Scotland) Act 2008; Public Health etc. (Scotland) Act 2008 (Commencement No. 2, Savings and Consequential Provisions) Order 2009
- Relates to: Rats and Mice (Destruction) Act 1919

Status: Amended

Text of statute as originally enacted

Revised text of statute as amended

Text of the Prevention of Damage by Pests Act 1949 as in force today (including any amendments) within the United Kingdom, from legislation.gov.uk.

The Prevention of Damage by Pests Act 1949 (12, 13 & 14 Geo. 6. c. 55) is an act of the Parliament of the United Kingdom in the United Kingdom, which creates a duty on local authorities to control mice and rats. The legislation grants powers to local authorities to compel land owners and/or occupiers to take action to keep land free from rats and mice.
