= Abolition of Domestic Rates Etc. (Scotland) Act 1987 =

Act of the Parliament of the United Kingdom

Abolition of Domestic Rates Etc. (Scotland) Act 1987 (Note: Section 35(1).)
- Act of Parliament
- Parliament of the United Kingdom
- Long title: An Act to abolish domestic rates in Scotland; to provide as to the finance of local government in Scotland; and for connected purposes.
- Citation: 1987 c. 47
- Territorial extent: Scotland (Note: Section 35(4).)

Dates
- Royal assent: 15 May 1987
- Commencement: 1 April 1989 (except section 34); 1 April 1994 (section 34); (Note: Section 35(2)–(3). The Abolition of Domestic Rates Etc. (Scotland) Act 1987 Commencement Order 1987 (SI 1987/1489).)
- Repealed: 26 March 2015 (Note: The Local Government Finance Act 1992 (Commencement No. 11) Order 2015 (SI 2015/59).)
Other legislation
Amends	Public Works Loans Act 1965; Sewerage (Scotland) Act 1968
Amended by	Water (Scotland) Act 1980
Repealed by	Local Government Finance Act 1992

Status: Repealed

Text of statute as originally enacted

Revised text of statute as amended

The Abolition of Domestic Rates Etc. (Scotland) Act 1987 (c. 47) was an act of the Parliament of the United Kingdom.

The Conservative government of Margaret Thatcher was committed to the reform of local government finance; the solution decided upon by the mid-1980s was the introduction of the per-capita community charge – informally called the poll tax – and the abolition of the previous "rates" system, which had been based solely on property ownership.

In Scotland, a revaluation of the housing rates in 1985-1986 had increased the burden on homeowners.

It was decided that the poll tax would be implemented in Scotland before the rest of the United Kingdom, and a bill was drafted and put before Parliament in late 1986 with this intention - it was the final major piece of legislation introduced before the election. It received its second reading on 9 December, when it was described by Malcolm Rifkind as a "radical reforming measure".

Two significant amendments were made in response to backbench concerns. Firstly, it was to be implemented in one sweep in 1989, rather than progressively between 1989 and 1992, against the advice of the Scottish Office. The second change was to make each individual liable to the tax responsible for paying rather than designating a single "head of household" in each residence and requiring them to collect for the others.

== Bibliography ==
- Failure in British government: the politics of the poll tax (pp. 101–104), David Butler, Andrew Adonis & Tony Travers. Oxford University Press, Oxford, 1994. ISBN 0-19-827876-4
