= Hedgerows Regulations 1997 =

- Statutory Instrument
- Parliament of the United Kingdom
- Citation: SI 1997/1160

Dates
- Made: 24 March 1997
- Commencement: 1 June 1997

Other legislation
- Made under: Environment Act 1995

Text of statute as originally enacted

Text of the Hedgerows Regulations 1997 as in force today (including any amendments) within the United Kingdom, from legislation.gov.uk.

The Hedgerows Regulations 1997 (SI 1997/1160) of England and Wales is a UK statutory instrument which came into effect on 1 June 1997 and is government legislation which falls under the Environment Act 1995. It was created to protect hedgerows, in particular those in the countryside aged 30 years or older. Since the legislation came into effect it is a criminal offence to remove a hedgerow in contravention to the regulations.

The legislation includes sub-categories detailing specific descriptions of offences, the procedure of notification to the local planning authority, circumstances that exempt the need to notify, replacement and retention notices, appeals against those notices, local planning authority records of hedgerows, injunctions, and how hedgerows may be defined to be 'important'.
