= Commissioner for Children and Young People (Scotland) Act 2003 =

- Act of the Scottish Parliament
- Scottish Parliament
- Long title: An Act of the Scottish Parliament to provide for the establishment and functions of a Commissioner for Children and Young People in Scotland; and for connected purposes.
- Citation: 2003 asp 17
- Territorial extent: Scotland

Dates
- Royal assent: 1 May 2003

Status: Current legislation

History of passage through the Parliament

Text of statute as originally enacted

Text of the Commissioner for Children and Young People (Scotland) Act 2003 as in force today (including any amendments) within the United Kingdom, from legislation.gov.uk.

The Commissioner for Children and Young People (Scotland) Act 2003 (asp 17) was passed by the Scottish Parliament in March 2003 to make provision for a Children's ombudsman. It established the Children and Young People's Commissioner Scotland with the general function of promoting and safeguarding the rights of children and young people.

== History ==
The Education, Culture and Sport Committee looked into the need for a Children’s Commissioner in 2001. The consultation period ran from May 2001 and children were invited to give evidence in Holyrood. A report was published in February 2002. A further report published in July 2002 by the Education, Culture and Sport Committee proposed a bill to appoint a Children's Commissioner. The bill was published on 5 December.

The bill was introduced to Parliament on 15 January 2003. A subordinate legislation subcommittee was convened. The legislation was passed towards the end of the 1st Scottish Parliament on 26 March 2003. It received royal assent on 1 May 2003.
