= Liferent =

Property right in Scots law

Liferent, or life-rent, in Scots law is the right to receive for life the benefits of a property or other asset without the right to dispose of the property or the asset. Where the property is held in fee simple, the owner is termed the fiar. (This is unrelated to Fiars Prices, another term in Scots law.) For some acts relating to the property, the consent of both liferenter and fiar may be required by law.

== Examples ==
- If a man held a liferent on arable land with a house, he could, for the rest of his life, live in the house and cultivate the land, keeping the income for himself. He could not transfer the land or house to another person.
- A liferent might be set by law (as when someone died, it would apply to the surviving spouse); or it might be set as a private arrangement between individuals.
