= Litter Act 1983 =

Act of the Parliament of the United Kingdom

Litter Act 1983 (Note: Section 13(1).)
- Act of Parliament
- Parliament of the United Kingdom
- Long title: An Act to consolidate the Litter Acts 1958 and 1971, together with section 51 of the Public Health Act 1961, section 4 of the Local Government (Development and Finance) (Scotland) Act 1964 and section 24 of the Control of Pollution Act 1974 and related provisions of those Acts.
- Citation: 1983 c. 35
- Territorial extent: England and Wales; Scotland; (Note: Section 13(4)–(5).)

Dates
- Royal assent: 13 May 1983
- Commencement: 13 August 1983 (Note: Section 13(3). Section 4 of the act was subject to a separate commencement order that was never made.)

Other legislation
- Amends: See § Repealed enactments
- Repeals/revokes: See § Repealed enactments
- Amended by: Roads (Scotland) Act 1984; Local Government Act 1985; Environmental Protection Act 1990; Statute Law (Repeals) Act 1993; Local Government etc. (Scotland) Act 1994; Environment Act 1995; Land Registration etc. (Scotland) Act 2012; Regulatory Reform (Scotland) Act 2014

Status: Amended

Text of statute as originally enacted

Revised text of statute as amended

Text of the Litter Act 1983 as in force today (including any amendments) within the United Kingdom, from legislation.gov.uk.

The Litter Act 1983 (c. 35) is an act of the Parliament of the United Kingdom that consolidated enactments relating to litter in Great Britain.

== Provisions ==
=== Repealed enactments ===
Section 12(3) of the act repealed 11 enactments, listed in schedule 2 to the act.

Citation	Short title	Extent of repeal
6 & 7 Eliz. 2. c. 34	Litter Act 1958	The whole act.
9 & 10 Eliz. 2. c. 64	Public Health Act 1961	Section 51.
1963 c. 33	London Government Act 1963	In Schedule 2, in paragraph 31, sub-paragraph (iv).
1964 c. 67	Local Government (Development and Finance) (Scotland) Act 1964	Section 4.
1971 c. 35	Dangerous Litter Act 1971	The whole act.
1971 c. lxi	City of London (Various Powers) Act 1971	In section 13(1), the words ", notwithstanding the provisions of subsection (5) of the said section 51,".
1972 c. 70	Local Government Act 1972	In Schedule 14, paragraph 41.
1973 c. 65	Local Government (Scotland) Act 1973	In Schedule 27, in Part II, paragraph 153.
1974 c. 40	Control of Pollution Act 1974	Section 24.
1980 c. 65	Local Government, Planning and Land Act 1980	In Schedule 7, paragraph 6(5).
1980 c. 66	Highways Act 1980	In Schedule 24, paragraph 9.

== Subsequent developments ==
Sections 1, 2 and 12(1) of the act were repealed by section 162(2) of, and part IV of schedule 16 to, the Environmental Protection Act 1990, which came into force on 1 April 1991. (Note: The Environmental Protection Act 1990 (Commencement No. 7) Order 1991 (SI 1991/1042).)

Section 4 of the act, which would have imposed duties on local authorities in England and Wales and regional councils in Scotland to consult together and publicise plans for abating litter, was subject under section 13(2) to commencement by order; no such order was ever made and the section has never been in force.
