= Environmental Protection Act 1990 =

Act of the Parliament of the United Kingdom

Environmental Protection Act 1990 (Note: Section 164(1).)
- Act of Parliament
- Parliament of the United Kingdom
- Long title: An Act to make provision for the improved control of pollution arising from certain industrial and other processes; to re-enact the provisions of the Control of Pollution Act 1974 relating to waste on land with modifications as respects the functions of the regulatory and other authorities concerned in the collection and disposal of waste and to make further provision in relation to such waste; to restate the law defining statutory nuisances and improve the summary procedures for dealing with them, to provide for the termination of the existing controls over offensive trades or businesses and to provide for the extension of the Clean Air Acts to prescribed gases; to amend the law relating to litter and make further provision imposing or conferring powers to impose duties to keep public places clear of litter and clean; to make provision conferring powers in relation to trolleys abandoned on land in the open air; to amend the Radioactive Substances Act 1960; to make provision for the control of genetically modified organisms; to make provision for the abolition of the Nature Conservancy Council and for the creation of councils to replace it and discharge the functions of that Council and, as respects Wales, of the Countryside Commission; to make further provision for the control of the importation, exportation, use, supply or storage of prescribed substances and articles and the importation or exportation of prescribed descriptions of waste; to confer powers to obtain information about potentially hazardous substances; to amend the law relating to the control of hazardous substances on, over or under land; to amend section 107(6) of the Water Act 1989 and sections 31(7)(a), 31A(2)(c)(i) and 32(7)(a) of the Control of Pollution Act 1974; to amend the provisions of the Food and Environment Protection Act 1985 as regards the dumping of waste at sea; to make further provision as respects the prevention of oil pollution from ships; to make provision for and in connection with the identification and control of dogs; to confer powers to control the burning of crop residues; to make provision in relation to financial or other assistance for purposes connected with the environment; to make provision as respects superannuation of employees of the Groundwork Foundation and for remunerating the chairman of the Inland Waterways Amenity Advisory Council; and for purposes connected with those purposes.
- Citation: 1990 c. 43
- Introduced by: Chris Patten, Secretary of State for the Environment, 20 December 1989
- Territorial extent: England and Wales; Scotland; Northern Ireland; (Note: Section 164(4)–(5).)

Dates
- Royal assent: 1 November 1990
- Commencement: 1 November 1990 – 16 December 2005 (Note: Section 164(2)–(3).)
Other legislation
Amends	London Government Act 1963; Prevention of Oil Pollution Act 1971; Refuse Disposal (Amenity) Act 1978; Litter Act 1983; Public Health (Control of Disease) Act 1984
Repeals/revokes	Alkali, &c. Works Regulation Act 1906; Public Health (Recurring Nuisances) Act 1969; City of Westminster Act 1988
Amended by	Deer Act 1991; Water Consolidation (Consequential Provisions) Act 1991; Further and Higher Education Act 1992; Protection of Badgers Act 1992; Clean Air Act 1993; Radioactive Substances Act 1993; Merchant Shipping Act 1995; Goods Vehicles (Licensing of Operators) Act 1995; Environment Act 1995; Employment Tribunals Act 1996; Employment Rights Act 1996; Planning (Consequential Provisions) (Scotland) Act 1997; Countryside and Rights of Way Act 2000; Statute Law (Repeals) Act 2004; Manufacture and Storage of Explosives Regulations 2005; Human Fertilisation and Embryology Act 2008; Infrastructure Act 2015; Policing and Crime Act 2017; Sentencing Act 2020
Relates to	Health and Safety at Work etc. Act 1974; EU regulation 1907/2006

Status: Amended

Text of statute as originally enacted

Text of the Environmental Protection Act 1990 as in force today (including any amendments) within the United Kingdom, from legislation.gov.uk.

The Environmental Protection Act 1990 (c. 43) (initialism: EPA) is an act of the Parliament of the United Kingdom that as of 2008 defines, within England and Wales and Scotland, the fundamental structure and authority for waste management and control of emissions into the environment.

== Overview ==
Part 1: establishes a general regime by which the Secretary of State, as of 2008 the Secretary of State for Environment, Food and Rural Affairs, can prescribe any process or substance and set limits on it respective of its emissions into the environment. Authorisation and enforcement was originally in the hands of HM Inspectorate of Pollution and local authorities but in 1996 became the responsibility of the Environment Agency (EA) and Scottish Environment Protection Agency (SEPA). Operation of a prescribed process is prohibited without approval and there are criminal sanctions against offenders.

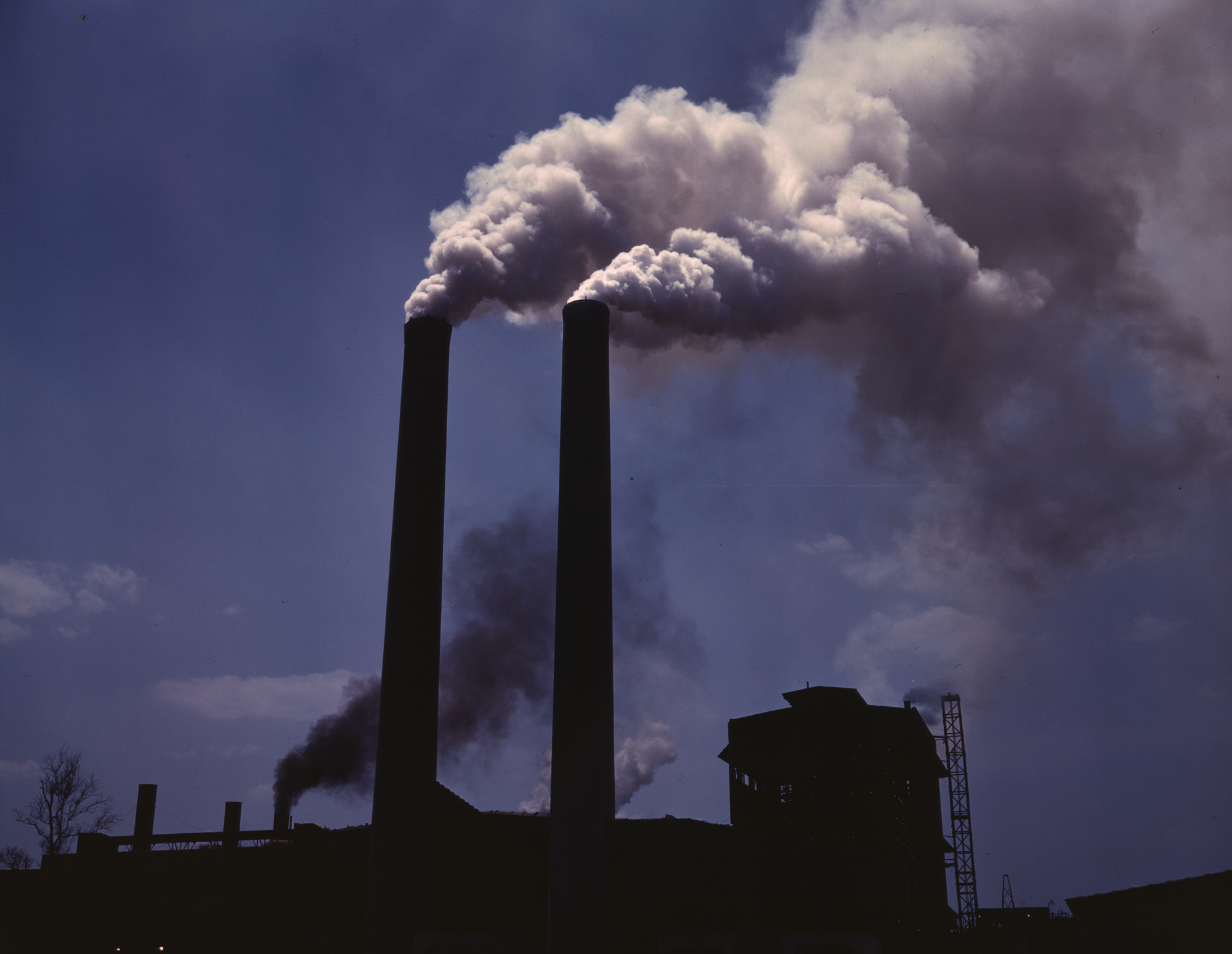
The act aims to control and reduce pollution

Part 2: sets out a regime for regulating and licensing the acceptable disposal of controlled waste on land.

Controlled waste is any household, industrial and commercial waste. Unauthorised or harmful depositing, treatment or disposal of controlled waste is prohibited with prohibition enforced by criminal sanctions. Further, there is a broad duty of care on importers, producers, carriers, keepers, treaters or disposers of controlled waste to prevent unauthorised or harmful activities. Breach of the duty of care is a crime.

The act demands that the Secretary of State creates a National Waste Strategy for England and Wales, and that SEPA creates a strategy for Scotland. Local authorities have duties to collect controlled waste and to undertake recycling.

There are criminal penalties on households and businesses who fail to co-operate with the local authorities' arrangements. Enforcement of these penalties sometimes proves controversial.

Part 2a: was inserted by the Environment Act 1995 and defines a scheme of identification and compulsory remedial action for contaminated land.

Part 3: defines a class of statutory nuisances over which the local authority can demand remedial action supported by criminal penalties.

Part 4: defines a set of criminal offences concerning litter.

Part 5: defines a regime of statutory notification and risk assessment for genetically modified organisms (GMOs). There are duties with respect to the import, acquisition, keeping, release or marketing of GMOs and the Secretary of State has the power to prohibit specific GMOs if there is a danger of environmental damage.

Part 6: of the act created three new organisations: the Nature Conservancy Council for England, the Nature Conservancy Council for Scotland, and the Countryside Council for Wales. Since 1990, the English and Scottish councils have been the subject of considerable reorganisation and, as of 2008, only the Welsh council is still governed by the act.

The act superseded the requirements under section 1(1)(d) of the Health and Safety at Work etc. Act 1974 in respect of controlling noxious emissions. (Note: s.162(2)/Sch.16)

In the operating year 2005/ 2006, the EA brought 880 prosecutions with an average fine of about £1,700, and 736 in 2006/2007 with an average fine of £6,773. There have also been sentences of imprisonment, including two of over sixteen months in 2006/ 2007.

== Background ==
The act implements the European Union Waste Framework Directive in England and Wales and Scotland.

The act was intended to strengthen pollution controls and support enforcement with heavier penalties. Before the act there had been separate environmental regulation of air, water and land pollution and the act brought in an integrated scheme that would seek the "best practicable environmental option". There was previously no uniform system of licensing or public right of access to information. The split of the Nature Conservancy Council (NCC) into English, Welsh and Scottish bodies was controversial. Purportedly forced on Secretary of State Chris Patten by Secretary of State for Scotland Malcolm Rifkind and forestry minister Lord Sanderson, some saw it as "punishment" for the vigorous opposition the NCC had mounted to afforestation in the Flow Country.

== Prescribed processes and substances ==
The Secretary of State has the power to prescribe specific processes and substances by statutory instrument. The power was exercised by the Environmental Protection (Prescribed Processes and Substances) Regulations 1991 which have been amended several times. Further, the Secretary of State can make regulations to fix emission standards on prescribed processes and substances.

Once a process is prescribed, it can only be operated on authorisation from the enforcing authority. Applications must be made to the authority (Note: Sch.1, Pt.1) and the authority can refuse authorisation or give it subject to conditions. The authorisation is transferable to somebody else who takes over the undertaking provided that the enforcing authority is notified. The enforcing authority can revoke the authorisation or vary its conditions and the operator can apply to have the conditions varied.

The 1991 regulations were revoked for England and Wales by the Environmental Permitting (England and Wales) Regulations 2007. Permitting is now regulated by the Environmental Permitting (England and Wales) Regulations 2010. The 1991 regulations remain in force in Scotland, although they are in practice superseded by the Pollution Prevention and Control (Scotland) Regulations 2000 and 2012 made under the Pollution Prevention and Control Act 1999.

=== Enforcement ===
Processes are stipulated as subject to either central control by the EA or SEPA, or local control by the local authority but only with respects to atmospheric pollution. Such an enforcing authority can issue an enforcement notice or prohibition notice on a noncompliant operator and there are criminal penalties including fines and imprisonment for violations.

An operator may appeal a decision about the issue of authorisation, conditions, enforcement or prohibition to the Secretary of State who may hold a hearing or public inquiry.

Enforcing authorities must provide public information on applications, authorisations and enforcement so long as confidentiality and national security are protected.

== Part II - Disposal of controlled waste on land ==
=== Controlled waste ===
Waste is defined as any substance or object within very broad categories set out in Schedule 2B "which the holder discards or intends or is required to discard". Controlled waste is "household, industrial and commercial waste or any such waste". The exact definition covers a very broad range of waste.

The meaning of discard was considered by the European Court of Justice in 2002, where it was held:

The term discard must be interpreted in light of the aim of Directive 75/442 which, according to its third recital, is the protection of human health and the environment against harmful effects caused by the collection, transport, treatment, storage and tipping of waste, and Article 174(2) EC which provides that community policy on the environment is to aim at a high level of protection and is to be based, in particular, on the precautionary principle and the principle that preventive action should be taken. It follows that the concept of waste cannot be interpreted restrictively. More specifically, the question whether a given substance is waste must be determined in the light of all the circumstances, regard being had to the aim of Directive 75/442 and the need to ensure that its effectiveness is not undermined.

=== Unauthorised or harmful deposit, treatment or disposal of controlled waste ===
No person may "treat, keep or dispose of controlled waste in a manner likely to cause pollution of the environment or harm to human health".

Except in the case of domestic household waste treated or kept or disposed of on the premises, no person may:

- Deposit controlled waste, or knowingly cause or knowingly permit controlled waste to be deposited in or on any land unless a waste management licence authorising the deposit is in force and the deposit is in accordance with the licence; or
- Treat, keep or dispose of controlled waste, or knowingly cause or knowingly permit controlled waste to be treated, kept or disposed of:
  - In or on any land; or
  - By means of any mobile plant;

— except under and in accordance with a waste management licence.

=== Duty of care in respect of waste ===
Section 34(1) imposes a duty on "any person who imports, produces, carries, keeps, treats or disposes of controlled waste or, as a broker, has control of such waste, to take all such measures applicable to him in that capacity as are reasonable in the circumstances":

- To prevent any contravention by any other person of section 33;
- To prevent any contravention of certain (i.e. specific) provisions of the Pollution Prevention and Control Regulations;
- To prevent the escape of the waste from his control or that of any other person; and
- On the transfer of the waste, to secure:
  - That the transfer is only to an authorised person or to a person for authorised transport purposes; and
  - That there is transferred such a written description of the waste as will enable other persons to avoid a contravention section 33 or the Pollution Prevention and Control Regulations.

Under section 34(2) an occupier of domestic property must, as respects the household waste produced on the property, take reasonable steps to secure that any transfer of waste is only to an authorised person or to a person for authorised transport purposes but has none of the other section 34(1) duties.

Authorised persons include local authorities who have responsibility for waste collection, persons licensed to manage or registered to transport waste or otherwise exempt persons.

Section 34(5) allows the Secretary of State to make regulations as to retention of documents and the Environmental Protection (Duty of Care) Regulations 1991 stipulate that:

- All transfers of controlled waste must be accompanied by a transfer note;
- Copies of all transfer notes must be kept for two years; and
- Transfer notes must be available to the enforcement authority.

=== Waste management licences ===
Licences are issued by waste management authorities and may be subject to conditions. The Secretary of State may make regulations about what is to be included in the licence as a condition. Licences are transferable and decisions as to refusal to grant a licence or as to conditions can be appealed to the Secretary of State.·

=== National and local government responsibilities ===
Sections 44A and 44B were added by the Environment Act 1995 and require the development of national waste strategies for England and Wales, and Scotland respectively.

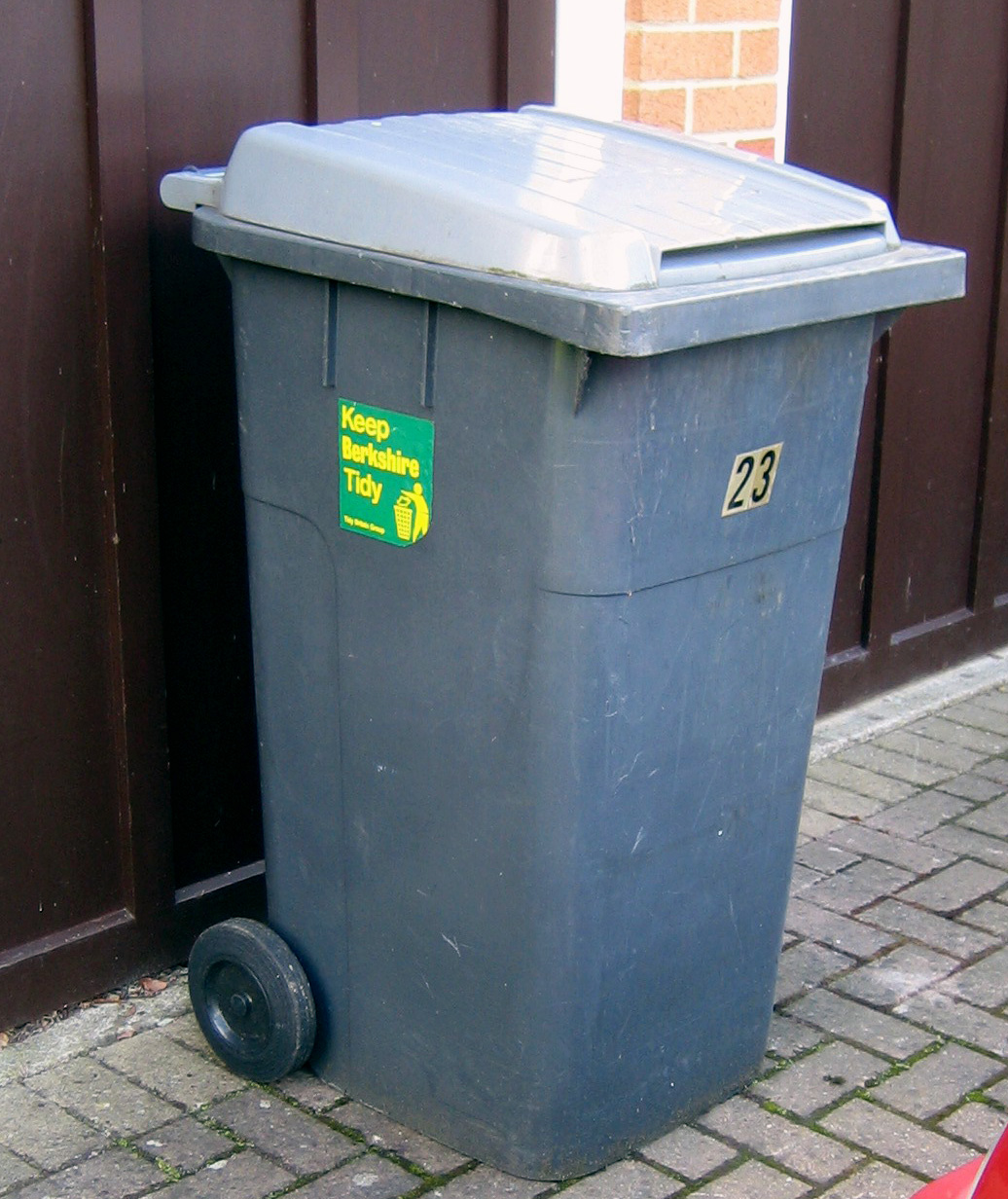
A typical wheelie bin household waste receptacle

Section 45 requires waste collection authorities, usually local authorities, to collect household waste unless it is in an isolated location or arrangements can reasonably be expected to be made by the person who controls the waste. They may also collect commercial waste if requested to do so, but are not obliged to provide this service. Industrial waste can only be collected with the consent of the waste disposal authority. No charge is to be made for collecting household waste, unless the Secretary of State makes regulations specifying certain (i.e. specific) collections that must be paid for. A reasonable charge is to be made for commercial waste collection (s.45(4)). Waste collection authorities have responsibilities for emptying privies and cesspools (Note: ss.45(5) and (6)) and have the power to lay pipes, sewers and other infrastructure to collect waste. Waste collected by a waste collection authority is the property of the authority.

The authority can give a householder notice that waste must be disposed of in a specified receptacle, and in a specified manner. It is a crime to fail, without reasonable excuse, to observe such requirements. On summary conviction in a magistrates' court, an offender can be fined up to level 3 on the standard scale.

Authorities also have powers over receptacles for commercial and industrial waste. There is a system of fixed penalty notices for offences under these sections. (Note: ss.47ZA-47ZB) Where controlled waste is deposited on land within their responsibilities, authorities may give notice to the occupier to remove it. (Note: ss.59-59A) It is a crime to disturb or sort over, unless with consent, waste deposited for collection by the waste collection authority. On summary conviction in a magistrates' court, an offender can be fined up to level 5 on the standard scale.

Waste collection authorities must deliver the waste to waste disposal authorities unless they intend to recycle it themselves. Waste disposal authorities must dispose of the waste and also provide facilities for householders to deposit their own waste.

From 31 December 2010, waste collection authorities in England must make arrangements for the separate collection of at least two types of recyclable waste unless it would be unreasonably costly to do so. (Note: s.45A) The Welsh National Assembly has the power to extend this to Wales. (Note: s.45B) Section 55 gives waste disposal authorities and waste collection authorities powers to recycle waste.

A disposal authority may:

- Make arrangements to recycle waste;
- Make arrangements to use waste to produce heat or electricity;
- Buy or otherwise acquire waste with a view to its being recycled;
- Use, sell or otherwise dispose of waste, or anything produced from such waste.

A waste collection authority may:

- Buy or otherwise acquire waste with a view to recycling it;
- Use, or dispose of by way of sale or otherwise to another person, waste belonging to the authority or anything produced from such waste.

=== Enforcement ===
Breach of sections 33 and 34 is a crime and penalties for serious offences by businesses can extend to unlimited fines, imprisonment, seizure of vehicles and clean-up costs.

== Part IIA - Contaminated land ==
Contaminated land is "any land which appears to the local authority in whose area it is situated to be in such a condition, by reason of substances in, on or under the land, that": (Note: s.78A)

- "Significant harm is being caused or there is a significant possibility of such harm being caused; or
- Significant pollution of the water environment is being caused or there is a significant possibility of such pollution being caused."

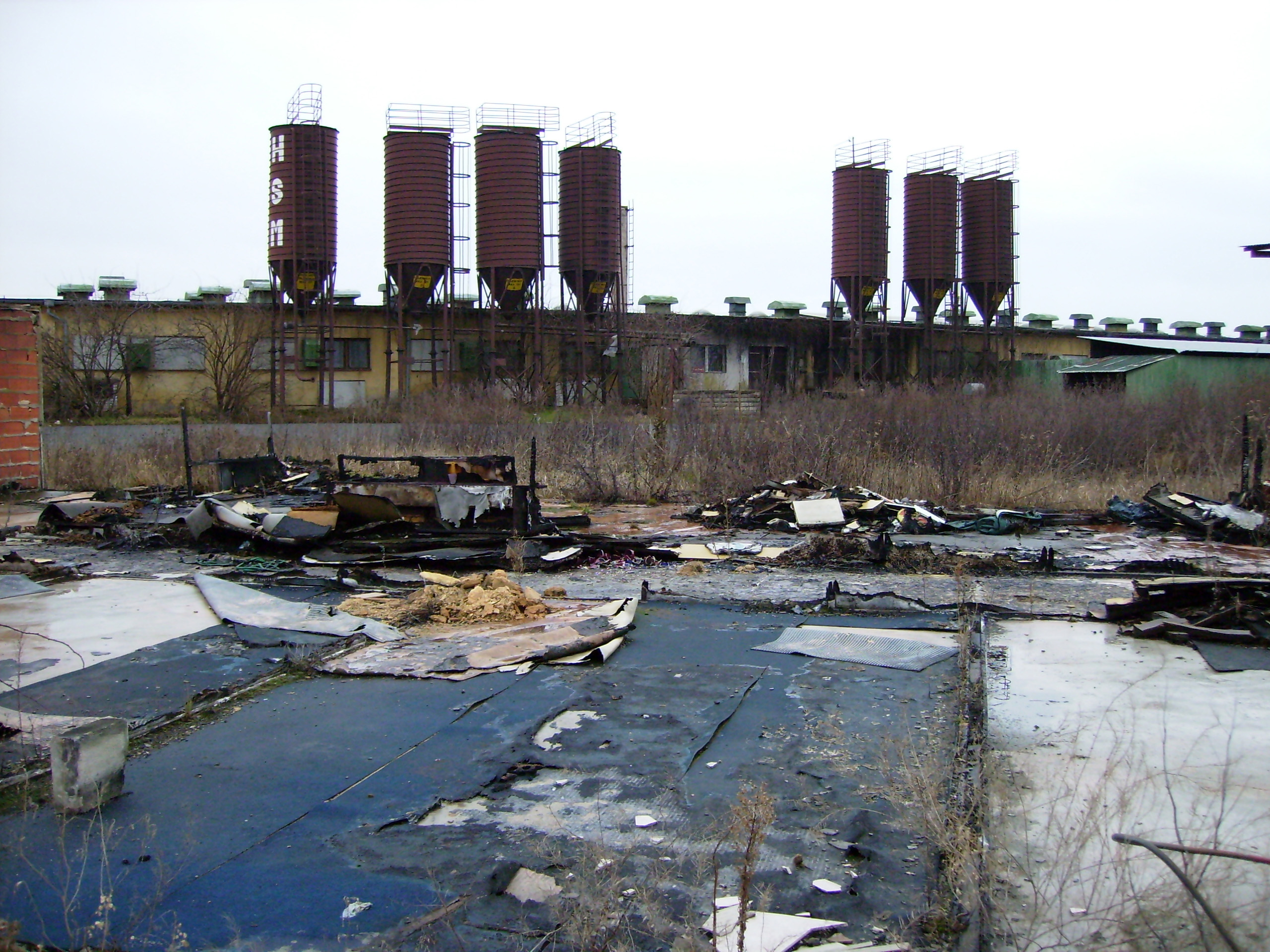
Contaminated land

The act does not apply to contamination from radioactivity (s.78YC) but similar provisions have been made under subsequent regulations.

Local authorities have a duty periodically to survey their locality and, using guidance defined by the Secretary of State, to designate contaminated land as a special site, advising the EA or SEPA. (Note: ss.78B-78C) The authority, EA or SEPA must then serve a remediation notice on the appropriate person. (Note: s.78E)

The appropriate person responsible for remedial work is "any person, or any of the persons, who caused or knowingly permitted the substances" giving rise to the designation "to be in, on or under that land". (Note: s.78F(2)) If no such person can be identified after reasonable enquiries, the present owner or occupier is the appropriate person. (Note: s.78F(4)-(5)) Any persons controlling other land to which access is required for remediation must grant such access and may apply to the appropriate person for compensation. (Note: s.78G) The appropriate person is deemed to be responsible for remediation of other land into which substances have escaped. (Note: s.78K)

The appropriate person may appeal a notice within 21 days to: (Note: s.78L)

- A magistrates' court, or a sheriff court in Scotland, where the notice was served by the local authority; or
- The Secretary of State, where the notice was served by the EA or SEPA.

There is a further right of appeal from the magistrates' court to the High Court. but ultimately it is a crime not to comply with a notice. (Note: s.78M) The local authority, EA or SEPA can perform the remedial work themselves if the appropriate person cannot be found, defaults or requests that they do so. (Note: s.78N) The authority have discretion as to whether to make the appropriate person responsible for the costs. (Note: s.78P)

Local authorities, the EA and SEPA must maintain a register of notices that is publicly available, save for reasons of confidentiality and national security. (Note: ss.78R-T)

== Part III - Statutory nuisances ==
Section 79 defines several statutory nuisances:

- Any premises in such a state as to be prejudicial to health or a nuisance;
- Smoke emitted from premises so as to be prejudicial to health or a nuisance;
- Fumes or gases emitted from premises so as to be prejudicial to health or a nuisance;
- Any dust, steam, smell or other effluvia arising on industrial, trade or business premises and being prejudicial to health or a nuisance;
- Any accumulation or deposit which is prejudicial to health or a nuisance;
- Any animal kept in such a place or manner as to be prejudicial to health or a nuisance;
- Noise emitted from premises so as to be prejudicial to health or a nuisance; and
- Noise that is prejudicial to health or a nuisance and is emitted from or caused by a vehicle, machinery or equipment on a highway, road, footway, square or court open to the public.

Some exclusions from these categories exist including contaminated land, activities of the armed forces, (Note: ss.79(2) and 79(6A)(b)) some categories of smoke and dark smoke, traffic and demonstrations.

Local authorities have a duty to make periodic inspections of their area or in response to a complaint from the public. The local authority shall serve an offending occupier with an abatement notice to cease the nuisance. The occupier can appeal the notice, within 21 days, to a magistrates' court, in England and Wales, or a sheriff court in Scotland. Otherwise, it is a crime to fail, without reasonable excuse, to comply with the notice, punishable on summary conviction by a fine at level 5 of the standard scale, rising by ten percent for every further day on which the nuisance continues. If the offence is committed by the occupier of business premises, the maximum fine is £40,000. Where the notice is not complied with, the local authority may take reasonable action to abate the nuisance and recover the expenses from the occupier, if necessary by installments or by making a charge on the property. (Note: s.81A(1))

Any person aggrieved by a statutory nuisance may make a complaint to the magistrates or sheriff. The court can order the occupier to abate the damage and, in England and Wales only, impose a fine of up to level 5 on the standard scale. It is a crime, without reasonable excuse, to disobey such an order, punishable on summary conviction by a fine at level 5 of the standard scale, rising by ten percent for every further day on which the nuisance continues. Sch.3, s.2 provides a power to a magistrates' court to grant a warrant of entry to a local authority for ascertaining whether there exists a statutory nuisance, and taking any action or executing any work to abate it.

Section 84 repeals local authority controls over offensive trades under the Public Health Act 1936.

== Part IV - Litter ==
Section 87 creates the criminal offence of leaving litter.

"If any person throws down, drops or otherwise deposits in, into or from any place to which this section applies, and leaves, any thing whatsoever in such circumstances as to cause, or contribute to, or tend to lead to, the defacement by litter of any place to which this section applies, he shall ... be guilty of an offence"

— Environmental Protect Act 1990 s.87(1)

There are exceptions where the person has lawful authorisation or consent. Offenders can, on summary conviction in a magistrates' court, be sentenced to a fine of up to level 4 on the standard scale.

There is also a system of fixed penalty notices. Local authorities and central government have duties to keep roads, highways and public spaces free from litter. Members of the public who are aggrieved by litter in public places can apply to a magistrates' court for an abatement notice to order the responsible public body to carry out its duties under section 89. Public authorities also have powers to issue litter abatement notices and litter clearing notices on the occupiers of certain (i.e. specific) premises to order clearing of litter. (Note: ss.92-92A) Occupiers can appeal against a notice to the magistrates' court within 21 days (Note: s.92B) but it is otherwise a crime to disobey a notice, punishable on summary conviction to a fine of up to level 4 on the standard scale. (Note: s.92C) A local authority may also issue street litter control notices to occupiers of certain (i.e. specific) premises, such as take away food establishments, to keep the street and public areas near to their premises clear of litter.

Local authorities have the power to designate land in order to prevent the distribution of free printed material, such as advertising flyers. Offenders face summary conviction in a magistrates' court and a fine of up to level 4 on the standard scale, seizure of the material or a fixed penalty notice (Note: s.94B / Sch.3A) Local authorities may seize abandoned shopping trolleys and luggage trolleys, returning them to their owner and imposing a statutory fee, or otherwise disposing of them. (Note: s.99 / Sch.4)

Some of the provisions of this part were repealed and superseded by the Clean Neighbourhoods and Environment Act 2005.

== Part V - Amendment of the Radioactive Substances Act 1960 ==
Part V made a number of amendments to the Radioactive Substances Act 1960, including in relation to the appointment of inspectors and assistant inspectors, fees in respect of registrations, enforcement powers and application of the act to Crown and United Kingdom Atomic Energy Authority premises.

It was repealed by the Radioactive Substances Act 1993, which consolidated the 1960 Act.

== Part VI - Genetically modified organisms ==
Part VI contains provision intended to ensure that "all appropriate measures are taken to avoid damage to the environment which may arise from the escape or release from human control of genetically modified organisms". These include limitations on the import, acquisition, keeping, release or marketing of GMOs.

== See also ==
- Environment Agency v Clark

== Bibliography ==
- Defra (1996). Waste Management, The Duty of Care, A Code of Practice (PDF). London: The Stationery Office. ISBN 0-11-753210-X. Archived from the original (PDF) on 31 January 2012.
- Defra (2006). Contaminated Land: Environmental Protection Act 1990 (Defra Circular 1/2006 ed.). London: The Stationery Office. ISBN 0-11-243096-1.
- Tromans, S. (1991). Environmental Protection Act, 1990: Text and Commentary. London: Sweet & Maxwell. ISBN 0-421-44260-3.
