= Local Government and Rating Act 1997 =

Act of the Parliament of the United Kingdom

Local Government and Rating Act 1997 (Note: Section 35(1).)
- Act of Parliament
- Parliament of the United Kingdom
- Long title: An Act to make further provision about non-domestic rating; to make further provision about parishes and parish councils; to confer additional powers on parish councils and community councils; and for connected purposes.
- Citation: 1997 c. 29
- Territorial extent: England and Wales (in part); Scotland (in part); (Note: Section 35(2)–(4).)

Dates
- Royal assent: 19 March 1997
- Commencement: Various (Note: Section 34.)
Other legislation
| Amends | Local Government Act 1948; Rating and Valuation (Scotland) Act 1952; Local Government (Scotland) Act 1966; Local Government (Scotland) Act 1973; Water (Scotland) Act 1980; National Heritage Act 1983; National Heritage (Scotland) Act 1985; Gas Act 1995 |
| Repeals/revokes | Rating and Valuation (Apportionment) Act 1928 |
| Amended by | Postal Services Act 2000; Postal Services Act 2011; Non-Domestic Rating Act 2023 |

Status: Amended

Text of statute as originally enacted

Revised text of statute as amended

The Local Government and Rating Act 1997 (c. 29) is an act of the Parliament of the United Kingdom

== Provisions ==
The act allows a community at the village, neighbourhood, town or similar level beneath a district or borough council to demand its own elected parish or town council. Under the act, parish councils took on more powers relating to crime prevention, traffic management and transport.

The act removed the crown immunity from non-domestic rates in England, Wales, and Scotland, with the Rates (Amendment) (Northern Ireland) Order 1998 providing for the equivalent policy for Northern Ireland.

This right only applies to communities within England and outside of Greater London. The Local Government and Public Involvement in Health Act 2007 would later extend the parish petition right to places within Greater London.

Section 11 of the act allows any such community to collect a petition for a new parish or town council and also to define the area that it shall cover. Once the petition meets a certain threshold of registered electors’ signatures, the local metropolitan borough council, district council or unitary authority cannot stop it. The final decision as to whether any community can have its own parish council is down to the Secretary of State for Communities and Local Government.

== Bibliography ==
- "Local Government and Rating Act 1997". Current Law Statutes 1997. Sweet & Maxwell. London. W Green. Edinburgh. 1997. Volume 2: . Chapter 29.
- "Local Government and Rating Act 1997". Halsbury's Statutes of England and Wales. Fourth Edition. 2009 Reissue. LexisNexis. Volume 26(1). Page 395 et seq.
- Alistair Jones. The Resurgence of Parish Council Powers in England. (Palgrave Pivot). Palgrave Macmillan. 2020. Page 34.
- Janice Morphet. Infrastructure Delivery Planning. Policy Press. 2016. Page 177.
- Hugh Atkinson. Local democracy, civic engagement and community. Manchester University Press. 2012. Page 108.
- Colin Rallings, Michael Thrasher and James Downe. One Vote, One Value: Electoral Re-districting in English Local Government. Ashgate. 2002. Page 218. Google
- Tony Byrne. Local Government in Britain. Seventh Edition. Penguin Books. 2000. Pages xxxvi, 56, 355, 364, 519, 524 and 529.
- Janice Morphet. Modern Local Government. SAGE Publications. 2008. Page 131.
- Paul Clayden. The Local Council Clerk's Guide. Shaw. 2001. Pages 2, 96 and 126. Google
- Andrew Arden, Jonathan Manning and Scott Collins. Local Government Constitutional and Administrative Law. Sweet & Maxwell. 1999. Pages 17, 23 and 294. Google
- Stanley de Smith and Rodney Brazier. Constitutional and Administrative Law. Eighth Edition. Penguin Books. 1998. Page 142.
- Frances Plimmer. Rating Law and Valuation. Pearson Education Limited. 1998. Routledge. 2013. Paragraphs 3.2.3, 4.3.17, 4.3.19, 4.5.7 and 12.4.7 at pages xiv, 30, 48, 49, 52 and 162.
- Matthew Cain Ormondroyd. Rating and Council Tax Pocket Book. Routledge. 2017. Paragraph 4.62 at page 75.
- Andrew Baum, Gary Sams, Jennifer Ellis, Claire Hampson and Douglas Stevens. Statutory Valuations. Fourth Edition. 2007. Page 156.
- (2001) Journal of Planning and Environment Law 651
- (2004) 73 Town and Country Planning 293
- (2000) 71 The Town Planning Review 427
- Andrew W Gilg. Perspectives on British Rural Planning Policy, 1994-97. Ashgate. 1999. Page 48. Google. Routledge Revivals. PT81 and PT177.
- Nick Gallent and Steve Robinson. Neighbourhood planning. Policy Press. 2013. Page 37.
- Mark Tewdwr-Jones and Philip Allmendinger (eds). Territory, Identity and Spatial Planning. Routledge. 2006. Page 316.
