= Radioactive Substances Act 1993 =

Act of the Parliament of the United Kingdom

Radioactive Substances Act 1993 (Note: Section 51(1).)
- Act of Parliament
- Parliament of the United Kingdom
- Long title: An Act to consolidate certain enactments relating to radioactive substances with corrections and minor improvements made under the Consolidation of Enactments (Procedure) Act 1949.
- Citation: 1993 c. 12
- Territorial extent: United Kingdom (Note: Section 51(3).)

Dates
- Royal assent: 27 May 1993
- Commencement: 27 August 1993 (Note: Section 51(2).)

Other legislation
- Amends: Salmon and Freshwater Fisheries Act 1975; Planning (Consequential Provisions) Act 1990; See § Repealed enactments
- Repeals/revokes: Radioactive Substances Act 1960; See § Repealed enactments
- Amended by: Justice (Northern Ireland) Act 2002; Statute Law (Repeals) Act 2004; Environmental Permitting (England and Wales) Regulations 2010; Environmental Permitting (England and Wales) (Amendment) Regulations 2011; Radioactive Substances Act 1993 Amendment (Scotland) Regulations 2011; Radioactive Substances Act 1993 (Amendment) Regulations (Northern Ireland) 2011; Environmental Authorisations (Scotland) Regulations 2018; Radioactive Substances (Modification of Enactments) Regulations (Northern Ireland) 2018
- Relates to: Consolidation of Enactments (Procedure) Act 1949

Status: Partially repealed

Text of statute as originally enacted

Revised text of statute as amended

Text of the Radioactive Substances Act 1993 as in force today (including any amendments) within the United Kingdom, from legislation.gov.uk.

The Radioactive Substances Act 1993 (c. 12) (RSA93) is an act of the Parliament of the United Kingdom deals with the control of radioactive material and disposal of radioactive waste in the United Kingdom.

On 6 April 2010 the Environmental Permitting (England and Wales) Regulations 2010 (SI 2010/675) came into force. These new regulations repeal, amend and replace much of Radioactive Substances Act 1993 in England and Wales.

== Provisions ==
=== Repealed enactments ===
Section 50 of the act repealed 17 enactments and revoked 5 instruments, listed in parts I to III and part IV of schedule 6 to the act, respectively.

Part I – Acts of the Parliament of the United Kingdom
Citation	Short title	Extent of repeal
Note: Except as provided in Part II of this schedule, the repeal of the Radioactive Substances Act 1948 does not extend to Northern Ireland.
11 & 12 Geo. 6. c. 37	Radioactive Substances Act 1948	The whole act so far as unrepealed.
8 & 9 Eliz. 2. c. 34	Radioactive Substances Act 1960	The whole act.
1968 c. 47	Sewerage (Scotland) Act 1968	In Schedule 1, paragraph 4.
1973 c. 65	Local Government (Scotland) Act 1973	In Schedule 27, in Part II, paragraph 144.
1979 c. 2	Customs and Excise Management Act 1979	In Schedule 4, in Part I of the Table following paragraph 12, the entry relating to the Radioactive Substances Act 1948.
1980 c. 45	Water (Scotland) Act 1980	In Schedule 10, in Part II, the entry relating to the Radioactive Substances Act 1960.
1984 c. 55	Building Act 1984	In Schedule 6, paragraph 7.
1986 c. 63	Housing and Planning Act 1986	In Part II of Schedule 7, paragraph 1.
1989 c. 15	Water Act 1989	In Schedule 25, paragraph 27.
1990 c. 11	Planning (Consequential Provisions) Act 1990	In Schedule 2, paragraph 7. In Schedule 4, paragraph 17 and the entry relating to it in the Table in paragraph 1(1).
1990 c. 43	Environmental Protection Act 1990	Sections 100 to 105.
1990 c. 43	Environmental Protection Act 1990	Schedule 5.
1990 c. 43	Environmental Protection Act 1990	In Schedule 15, paragraph 8.
1991 c. 46	Atomic Weapons Establishment Act 1991	In the Schedule, paragraph 5.
1991 c. 60	Water Consolidation (Consequential Provisions) Act 1991	In Schedule 1, paragraph 9.

Part II – Repeals in Radioactive Substances Act 1948 extending to Northern Ireland
Citation	Short title	Extent of repeal
Note: These repeals extend to Northern Ireland only.
11 & 12 Geo. 6. c. 37	Radioactive Substances Act 1948	Section 2.
11 & 12 Geo. 6. c. 37	Radioactive Substances Act 1948	Section 5(1)(b).
11 & 12 Geo. 6. c. 37	Radioactive Substances Act 1948	In section 7, in subsection (1), the words "except section two" and in subsection (2)(b), the words "(except section two)".
11 & 12 Geo. 6. c. 37	Radioactive Substances Act 1948	Section 8(7).
11 & 12 Geo. 6. c. 37	Radioactive Substances Act 1948	In section 9(1), the words "or orders".
11 & 12 Geo. 6. c. 37	Radioactive Substances Act 1948	In section 10, the words "or order" in both places.
11 & 12 Geo. 6. c. 37	Radioactive Substances Act 1948	In section 11, the words from the beginning to "under this Act and".
11 & 12 Geo. 6. c. 37	Radioactive Substances Act 1948	In section 12, the definitions of "registered dental practitioner", "registered pharmacist" and "sale by way of wholesale dealing".
11 & 12 Geo. 6. c. 37	Radioactive Substances Act 1948	Section 14(2)(f).

Part III – Northern Ireland legislation
Citation	Short title	Extent of repeal
1966 c. 17 (N.I.)	Fisheries Act (Northern Ireland) 1966	In Schedule 7, the amendments of the Radioactive Substances Act 1960.
1972 c. 5 (N.I.)	Water Act (Northern Ireland) 1972	Section 31(1).
SI 1973/70 (N.I. 2)	Water and Sewerage Services (Northern Ireland) Order 1973	In Schedule 3, paragraph 1.
SI 1978/1049 (N.I. 19)	Pollution Control and Local Government (Northern Ireland) Order 1978	In Schedule 4, paragraph 5.

Part IV – Subordinate legislation
Citation	Title	Extent of revocation
SI 1974/1821	Radioactive Substances Act 1948 (Modification) Regulations 1974	The whole instrument.
SI 1980/170	Control of Pollution (Special Waste) Regulations 1980	Regulation 3(2).
S.R. (N.I.) 1981/252	Pollution Control (Special Waste) Regulations (Northern Ireland) 1981	Regulation 4(2).
SI 1985/1884	Waste Regulation and Disposal (Authorities) Order 1985	In Schedule 2, paragraph 2.
SI 1991/2539	Control of Pollution (Radioactive Waste) (Scotland) Regulations 1991	Regulation 4.

== See also ==
- Ionising Radiations Regulations 1999
