= Water (Scotland) Act 1980 =

Act of the Parliament of the United Kingdom

Water (Scotland) Act 1980 (Note: Section 113(1).)
- Act of Parliament
- Parliament of the United Kingdom
- Long title: An Act to consolidate the enactments relating to water in Scotland.
- Citation: 1980 c. 45
- Territorial extent: Scotland (Note: Section 113(2).)

Dates
- Royal assent: 1 August 1980
- Commencement: 1 August 1980 (Note: Section 4(b) of the Interpretation Act 1978.)
Other legislation
| Repeals/revokes | Water (Scotland) Act 1946; Water (Scotland) Act 1949; Water Act 1958; Water (Scotland) Act 1967 |
| Amended by | Local Government (Miscellaneous Provisions) (Scotland) Act 1981; Civil Aviation Act 1982; Local Government and Planning (Scotland) Act 1982; Criminal Justice Act 1982; Telecommunications Act 1984; Roads (Scotland) Act 1984; Law Reform (Miscellaneous Provisions) (Scotland) Act 1985; Abolition of Domestic Rates Etc. (Scotland) Act 1987; Local Government Finance Act 1988; Water Act 1989; Electricity Act 1989; Food Safety Act 1990; New Roads and Street Works Act 1991; Natural Heritage (Scotland) Act 1991; Agricultural Holdings (Scotland) Act 1991; Local Government Finance Act 1992; Radioactive Substances Act 1993; Criminal Justice and Public Order Act 1994; Local Government etc. (Scotland) Act 1994; Environment Act 1995; Criminal Procedure (Consequential Provisions) (Scotland) Act 1995; Local Government etc. (Scotland) Act 1994 (Commencement No.7 and Savings) Order 1996; Planning (Consequential Provisions) (Scotland) Act 1997; Local Government and Rating Act 1997; Scotland Act 1998 (Consequential Modifications) (No. 2) Order 1999; Abolition of Feudal Tenure etc. (Scotland) Act 2000; Regulation of Care (Scotland) Act 2001; Water Industry (Scotland) Act 2002; Water Environment and Water Services (Scotland) Act 2003; Communications Act 2003 (Consequential Amendments) Order 2003; Energy Act 2004; Antisocial Behaviour etc. (Scotland) Act 2004; Water Services etc. (Scotland) Act 2005; Fire (Scotland) Act 2005; Licensing (Scotland) Act 2005; Water Environment (Consequential and Savings Provisions) (Scotland) Order 2006; Water Quality (Scotland) Regulations 2010; Public Services Reform (Scotland) Act 2010 (Consequential Modifications) Order 2011; Treaty of Lisbon (Changes in Terminology) Order 2011; Land Registration etc. (Scotland) Act 2012; Police and Fire Reform (Scotland) Act 2012; Water Resources (Scotland) Act 2013; Public Water Supplies (Scotland) Regulations 2014; Water Intended for Human Consumption (Private Supplies) (Scotland) Regulations 2017 |

Status: Amended

Text of statute as originally enacted

Revised text of statute as amended

Text of the Water (Scotland) Act 1980 as in force today (including any amendments) within the United Kingdom, from legislation.gov.uk.

The Water (Scotland) Act 1980 (c. 45) is an act of the Parliament of the United Kingdom that consolidated enactments relating to water in Scotland.

== Repealed enactments ==
Section 112(2) of the act repealed 14 enactments, listed in schedule 11 to the act.

Enactments repealed by section 112(2)
| Citation | Short title | Extent of repeal |
|---|---|---|
| 9 & 10 Geo. 6. c. 42 | Water (Scotland) Act 1946 | The whole act. |
| 9 & 10 Geo. 6. c. 49 | Acquisition of Land (Authorisation Procedure) Act 1946 | In Schedule 4, the entry relating to the Water (Scotland) Act 1946. |
| 12 & 13 Geo. 6. c. 31 | Water (Scotland) Act 1949 | The whole act. |
| 14 Geo. 6. c. 39 | Public Utilities Street Works Act 1950 | In Schedule 5, the entry relating to the Water (Scotland) Act 1946. |
| 4 & 5 Eliz. 2. c. 60 | Valuation and Rating (Scotland) Act 1956 | Section 18. |
| 6 & 7 Eliz. 2. c. 67 | Water Act 1958 | The whole act. |
| 7 & 8 Eliz. 2. c. 24 | Building (Scotland) Act 1959 | In Schedule 9, paragraph 5. |
| 1965 c. 4 | Science and Technology Act 1965 | In Schedule 2, the entry relating to the Water (Scotland) Act 1946. |
| 1967 c. 78 | Water (Scotland) Act 1967 | The whole act except section 4(3) and, in Schedule 2, paragraphs 14, 17 and 18. |
| 1969 c. 48 | Post Office Act 1969 | In Schedule 4, paragraph 40. |
| 1970 c. 38 | Building (Scotland) Act 1970 | In Schedule 1, in Part II, paragraph 4. |
| 1973 c. 65 | Local Government (Scotland) Act 1973 | Section 148(2) to (7) and (9). |
| 1973 c. 65 | Local Government (Scotland) Act 1973 | In Schedule 15, paragraph 27. |
| 1973 c. 65 | Local Government (Scotland) Act 1973 | In Schedule 17, paragraphs 3 to 63. |
| 1973 c. 65 | Local Government (Scotland) Act 1973 | In Schedule 23, paragraph 5(c). |
| 1973 c. 65 | Local Government (Scotland) Act 1973 | In Schedule 25, paragraphs 18 to 23 and 39. |
| 1973 c. 65 | Local Government (Scotland) Act 1973 | In Schedule 27, paragraph 158(b). |
| 1974 c. 40 | Control of Pollution Act 1974 | In Schedule 2, paragraphs 17 and 18. |
| 1975 c. 30 | Local Government (Scotland) Act 1975 | In Schedule 6, paragraphs 10, 15, 16, 39 and 56(b). |
