= Scottish Building Standards Agency =

The Scottish Building Standards Agency was an executive agency of the Scottish Government. It was responsible for building standards regulations in Scotland.

The Agency was based in Livingston, West Lothian.

== History ==
Building (Scotland) Act 2003 (Note: Section 59(2).)
- Act of the Scottish Parliament
- Scottish Parliament
- Long title: An Act of the Scottish Parliament to make further provision with respect to buildings, building standards, work in relation to buildings and related matters; and for connected purposes.
- Citation: 2003 asp 8
- Territorial extent: Scotland

Dates
- Royal assent: 26 March 2003
- Commencement: various (Note: Section 59(2).)

Other legislation
- Amends: Local Government (Scotland) Act 1973; Fire Safety and Safety of Places of Sport Act 1987; Criminal Procedure (Scotland) Act 1995
- Amended by: Sewerage (Scotland) Act 1968

Status: Amended

Text of statute as originally enacted

Revised text of statute as amended

Text of the Building (Scotland) Act 2003 as in force today (including any amendments) within the United Kingdom, from legislation.gov.uk.

The agency was formed on 21 June 2004. It was set the responsibility to carry out the duties of the Scottish Government as set out in the Building (Scotland) Act 2003 (asp 8). The 2003 act introduced a new building standards system in Scotland, which started on 1 May 2005. The building standards system is set out to protect the public interest in the design, construction, conversion and demolition of buildings. The system requires plans to be verified as meeting the standards set out in the regulations.

The agency was located in Livingston, in line with the Government's policy of relocating public sector jobs outwith Edinburgh. Staff from the existing building standards division of the Scottish Government were transferred to the Agency.

The Agency was disbanded on 1 April 2008, and its functions were transferred back to the Scottish Government.

== Role ==
The Agency described their functions as to:

- to prepare the building regulations and write guidance on how to meet the regulations
- to provide views on compliance to help verifiers make decisions
- to grant relaxations of the regulations in exceptional cases
- to maintain a register of Approved Certifiers
- to monitor and audit the certification system
- to monitor and audit the performance of verifiers
- to verify Crown building work
