= Sewerage (Scotland) Act 1968 =

Act of the Parliament of the United Kingdom

Sewerage (Scotland) Act 1968 (Note: Section 61(1).)
- Act of Parliament
- Parliament of the United Kingdom
- Long title: An Act to make new provision as respects sewerage in Scotland, and for connected purposes.
- Citation: 1968 c. 47
- Territorial extent: Scotland (Note: Section 61(1).)

Dates
- Royal assent: 26 July 1968
- Commencement: 16 May 1972 (various) (Note: Section 61(2). The Sewerage (Scotland) Act 1968 (Commencement) Order 1972 (SI 1972/363).); 16 May 1973 (rest of act)

Other legislation
- Amends: See § Repealed enactments
- Repeals/revokes: See § Repealed enactments
- Amended by: Local Government (Scotland) Act 1973; Criminal Procedure (Scotland) Act 1975; Airports Authority Act 1975; Criminal Justice Act 1982; Telecommunications Act 1984; Roads (Scotland) Act 1984; Abolition of Domestic Rates Etc. (Scotland) Act 1987; Radioactive Substances Act 1993; Local Government etc. (Scotland) Act 1994; Environment Act 1995; Criminal Procedure (Consequential Provisions) (Scotland) Act 1995; Scotland Act 1998 (Consequential Modifications) (No.2) Order 1999; Regulation of Care (Scotland) Act 2001; Water Industry (Scotland) Act 2002; Water Environment and Water Services (Scotland) Act 2003; Building (Scotland) Act 2003; Communications Act 2003 (Consequential Amendments) Order 2003; Antisocial Behaviour etc. (Scotland) Act 2004; Public Health etc. (Scotland) Act 2008; Public Services Reform (Scotland) Act 2010 (Consequential Modifications) Order 2011; Crown Estate Transfer Scheme 2017; Environmental Authorisations (Scotland) Amendment Regulations 2025

Status: Amended

Text of statute as originally enacted

Revised text of statute as amended

Text of the Sewerage (Scotland) Act 1968 as in force today (including any amendments) within the United Kingdom, from legislation.gov.uk.

The Sewerage (Scotland) Act 1968 (c. 47) is an act of the Parliament of the United Kingdom which required every local authority in Scotland to provide a network of sewers to ensure that domestic sewage, surface water and trade effluent was effectively drained from their area, and to construct sewage treatment works or other facilities to deal with the contents of those sewers.

== Implementation ==
The act was an attempt to improve the provision of sewerage services in Scotland, by requiring local authorities to provide a network of sewers and treatment works or other facilities to deal with the contents of those sewers. Local authorities were further required to ensure that the sewer network was accessible to owners of premises, enabling them to connect to the network "at a reasonable cost". However, this concept was also applied to the local authority, who did not have to do anything that was not practicable at a reasonable cost. In the event that agreement could not be reached as to what was reasonable cost, the matter could be referred to the Secretary of State, and his decision would be binding.

The act was divided into three parts, with part I covering general provisions as to sewerage in sections 1 to 23, part 2 covering trade effluents in sections 24 to 38, and part 3 covering miscellaneous and general provision in sections 39 to 61. There were two schedules attached to the end of the Act. Section 5 allowed local authorities to collaborate by connecting their sewerage systems or treatment works together to be more effective. Section 10 allowed them to arrange to empty septic tanks within their area on a regular basis, provided that they did not contain trade effluent, while section 11 required them to keep maps showing where the public sewers were located. The maps were to distinguish between sewers for foul water and those for surface water where this was relevant.

Part 2 gave traders a legal right to discharge trade effluent into the public sewers, where such effluent was produced within their premises. Such discharges had to be notified to the local authority, to specify the nature, composition and temperature of the discharge, the maximum volume per day that would be discharged, and the maximum hourly rate at which it would enter the sewers. Section 29 listed a number of conditions on what could be discharged, as well as on whether it needed to be pre-treated, and the local authority could make charges to cover the costs of treating such discharges.

Many of the provisions of part 3 were quite mundane, but section 40 allowed local authorities to conduct research into the problems of sewerage and sewage treatment, or to make contributions towards such research. They could publish information about such problems, arrange seminars or lectures about them, hold exhibitions which included pictures, models or films, and could finance the production of pictures, models or films, either directly or in collaboration with others.

Subsequently, to the passing of the act, the nature of "reasonable cost" has been defined more precisely, and from 1 April 2006, the Provision of Water and Sewerage Services (Reasonable Costs) (Scotland) Regulations 2006 came into force. These limited the maximum cost to a domestic customer for connecting to the sewerage network to £1,500. The original act gave local authorities, and Scottish Water who have subsequently taken over the roles of the local authorities in the provision of sewerage services, the power to specify the location and mode of connection where a customer may connect to the public sewers, in order to prevent the disruption of the existing network. This is quite different to the law in England and Wales, where the High Court ruled that the Water Industry Act 1991 did not contain a similar condition, when judging a dispute between Barratt Homes and Welsh Water, and that the connection could thus be made in a way that would result in the sewers being overloaded.

=== Repealed enactments ===
Section 60(2) of the act repealed 7 enactments, listed in schedule 2 to the act.

Enactments repealed by section 60(2)
Citation	Short title	Extent of repeal
39 & 40 Vict. c. 75	Rivers Pollution Prevention Act 1876	The whole act.
55 & 56 Vict. c. 55	Burgh Police (Scotland) Act 1892	In section 107, the word "sewers".
55 & 56 Vict. c. 55	Burgh Police (Scotland) Act 1892	In section 111, the words "and for cleansing the sewers and drains".
55 & 56 Vict. c. 55	Burgh Police (Scotland) Act 1892	Sections 214 to 222, 224, 225 and 227.
55 & 56 Vict. c. 55	Burgh Police (Scotland) Act 1892	In section 228, the words "No building shall be erected over any sewer belonging to the commissioners", the words "and so as not to interfere or communicate with any sewers belonging to the commissioners", the words "any building be erected", and the words "erecting such building".
55 & 56 Vict. c. 55	Burgh Police (Scotland) Act 1892	Sections 229 to 232.
55 & 56 Vict. c. 55	Burgh Police (Scotland) Act 1892	In section 233, the words from "guilty of" to "besides being".
55 & 56 Vict. c. 55	Burgh Police (Scotland) Act 1892	Sections 234 to 237 and section 242.
55 & 56 Vict. c. 55	Burgh Police (Scotland) Act 1892	In section 243 the words "drain or" wherever they occur, and the words from "and all branch drains" onwards.
55 & 56 Vict. c. 55	Burgh Police (Scotland) Act 1892	In section 250, the words "and with power to make such drain if none such already exist", the words from "the sanction" to "street; and", the words "with the expense of restoring the street, so far as interfered with", and the words from "with such" to "may fix".
55 & 56 Vict. c. 55	Burgh Police (Scotland) Act 1892	In section 329, the words from "the special" to "sewers", the words "rate or", and the word "rate".
55 & 56 Vict. c. 55	Burgh Police (Scotland) Act 1892	In sections 330 and 331, the word "rate".
55 & 56 Vict. c. 55	Burgh Police (Scotland) Act 1892	In section 332, the word "rate" where first occurring.
55 & 56 Vict. c. 55	Burgh Police (Scotland) Act 1892	Sections 361, 362 and 364.
55 & 56 Vict. c. 55	Burgh Police (Scotland) Act 1892	In section 366, the words "special sewer rate, general sewer rate, and".
55 & 56 Vict. c. 55	Burgh Police (Scotland) Act 1892	In section 367, the words "rates or" wherever they occur.
55 & 56 Vict. c. 55	Burgh Police (Scotland) Act 1892	In section 368, the words "special sewer rate, general sewer rate, and", the words "rates and", and the words "rated or" and "rates or" wherever they occur.
55 & 56 Vict. c. 55	Burgh Police (Scotland) Act 1892	In section 369, the words "rates or" wherever they occur.
55 & 56 Vict. c. 55	Burgh Police (Scotland) Act 1892	Schedule VI so far as it relates to general sewer rate and special sewer rate.
60 & 61 Vict. c. 38	Public Health (Scotland) Act 1897	Sections 101 to 112, 114 and 115.
60 & 61 Vict. c. 38	Public Health (Scotland) Act 1897	In section 116, the words from "or to use" onwards.
60 & 61 Vict. c. 38	Public Health (Scotland) Act 1897	Sections 117, 119, 120, 122 and 139.
1 Edw. 7. c. 24	Burgh Sewerage, Drainage and Water Supply (Scotland) Act 1901	The whole act.
3 Edw. 7. c. 33	Burgh Police (Scotland) Act 1903	Section 25.
3 Edw. 7. c. 33	Burgh Police (Scotland) Act 1903	In section 98(6), the words "sewers, drains".
10 & 11 Geo. 6. c. 43	Local Government (Scotland) Act 1947	Part VII, so far as relating to the formation, operation and dissolution of special drainage districts.
10 & 11 Geo. 6. c. 43	Local Government (Scotland) Act 1947	Section 225(1) so far as relating to the special district sewer rate.
8 & 9 Eliz. 2. c. 34	Radioactive Substances Act 1960	In Part II of Schedule 1, paragraph 10, in paragraph 11 the reference to section 222, and in paragraph 13 the reference to section 120.

== Bibliography ==
- McKibbin, Desmond (6 May 2010). "Extent of the Mains Water Network in England, Wales, Scotland and the Republic of Ireland" (PDF). Northern Ireland Assembly Research and Library Services. Archived (PDF) from the original on 4 April 2017.
- Parliament (1968). "Sewerage (Scotland) Act 1968" (PDF). HMSO.
