= Fiars Prices =

Fiars Prices is an expression in old Scots law given to the average prices of each of the different sorts of grain grown in each county, as fixed annually by the sheriff, usually after the verdict of a jury. The use of fiars prices gradually diminished, and was abolished as part of the Local Government (Scotland) Act 1973.

Fiars Prices served as a rule for ascertaining the value of the grain due to feudal superiors, to the clergy or to lay proprietors of teinds, to landlords as a part or the whole of their rents and in all cases where the price of grain has not been fixed by the parties. The practice of "striking the fiars," as it is called, was probably first used to determine the value of the grain rents and duties payable to the Crown. In confirmation of this view it seems that at first the duty of the sheriffs was merely to make a return to the Court of Exchequer of the prices of grain within their counties, the court itself striking the fiars; and from an old case it appears that the fiars were struck above the true prices, being regarded rather as punishments to force the king's tenants to pay their rents than as the proper equivalent of the grain they had to pay.

Co-existent, however, with these fiars, which were termed sheriffs' fiars, there was at an early period another class called commissaries' fiars, by which the values of teinds were regulated. They have been traced back to the Reformation, and were under the management of the commissary or consistorial courts, which then took the place of the bishops and their officials. Although long out of use, but they were perhaps of greater antiquity than the sheriffs' fiars, and the model upon which these were instituted.

In 1723 the court of session passed an Act of Sederunt for the purpose of regulating the procedure in fiars courts. Down to that date the practice of striking the fiars was by no means universal over Scotland; and even in those counties into which it had been introduced, there was, as the preamble of the act puts it, "a general complaint that the said fiars are struck and given out by the sheriffs without due care and inquiry into the current and just prices." The Act in consequence provided that all sheriffs should summon annually, between the 4th and 10 February, a competent number of persons, living in the shire, of experience in the prices of grain within its bounds, and that from these they should choose a jury of fifteen, of whom at least eight were to be heritors; that witnesses and other evidence as to the price of grain grown in the county, especially since 1 November preceding until the day of inquiry, were to be brought before the jury, who might also proceed on "their own proper knowledge"; that the verdict was to be returned and the sentence of the sheriff pronounced by 1 March; and further, where custom or expediency recommended it, the sheriff was empowered to fix fiars of different values according to the different qualities of the grain.

It cannot be said that this act remedied all the evils of which it complained. The propriety of some of its provisions were questioned, and the competency of the court to pass it was doubted, even by the court itself. Its authority was entirely disregarded in one county—Haddingtonshire (now East Lothian)—where the fiars were struck by the sheriff alone, without a jury; and when this practice was called in question the court declined to interfere, observing that the fiars were better struck in Haddingtonshire than anywhere else. The other sheriffs in the main followed the Act, but with much variety of detail, and in many instances on principles the least calculated to reach the true average prices. Thus in some counties the averages were taken on the number of transactions, without regard to the quantities sold. In one case, in 1838, the evidence was so carelessly collected that the second or inferior barley fiars were 2s. 4d. higher than the first.

Formerly the price was struck by the boll, commonly the Linlithgowshire boll; (Note: The contemporary meaning of boll is the seed of plants such as flax or cotton; it is unclear what is meant in this archaic context.) in later years the imperial quarter was always used.

Prices fixed by the Court for "Striking the fiars" were also used in the settling of contracts where no prices have been determined upon, e.g. in fixing stipends of ministers of the Church of Scotland, and were found useful in other ways.
