= Environment Act 1995 =

Act of the Parliament of the United Kingdom

Environment Act 1995 (Note: Section 121(1).)
- Act of Parliament
- Parliament of the United Kingdom
- Long title: An Act to provide for the establishment of a body corporate to be known as the Environment Agency and a body corporate to be known as the Scottish Environment Protection Agency; to provide for the transfer of functions, property, rights and liabilities to those bodies and for the conferring of other functions on them; to make provision with respect to contaminated land and abandoned mines; to make further provision in relation to National Parks; to make further provision for the control of pollution, the conservation of natural resources and the conservation or enhancement of the environment; to make provision for imposing obligations on certain persons in respect of certain products or materials; to make provision in relation to fisheries; to make provision for certain enactments to bind the Crown; to make provision with respect to the application of certain enactments in relation to the Isles of Scilly; and for connected purposes.
- Citation: 1995 c. 25
- Introduced by: John Gummer (Commons)
- Territorial extent: England and Wales; Scotland; (Note: Section 121(7)–(9).)

Dates
- Royal assent: 19 July 1995
- Commencement: various (Note: Section 121(2)–(5).)

Other legislation
- Amends: Statistics of Trade Act 1947; Land Compensation Act 1961; Sewerage (Scotland) Act 1968; Employers' Liability (Compulsory Insurance) Act 1969; Prevention of Oil Pollution Act 1971; Local Government (Scotland) Act 1973; Salmon and Freshwater Fisheries Act 1975; House of Commons Disqualification Act 1975; Rent Act 1977; Water (Scotland) Act 1980; Litter Act 1983; Inshore Fishing (Scotland) Act 1984; County Courts Act 1984; Road Traffic Regulation Act 1984; Town and Country Planning Act 1990; Planning (Listed Buildings and Conservation Areas) Act 1990; Planning (Hazardous Substances) Act 1990; Planning (Consequential Provisions) Act 1990; Water Industry Act 1991; Water Resources Act 1991; Land Drainage Act 1991; Water Consolidation (Consequential Provisions) Act 1991
- Amended by: Employment Tribunals Act 1996; Employment Rights Act 1996; Planning (Consequential Provisions) (Scotland) Act 1997; Justices of the Peace Act 1997; Audit Commission Act 1998; Statute Law (Repeals) Act 1998; Countryside and Rights of Way Act 2000; Statute Law (Repeals) Act 2004; Commons Act 2006; Charities Act 2011; Cities and Local Government Devolution Act 2016; Sentencing Act 2020

Status: Amended

Text of statute as originally enacted

Revised text of statute as amended

Text of the Environment Act 1995 as in force today (including any amendments) within the United Kingdom, from legislation.gov.uk.

The Environment Act 1995 (c. 25) is an act of the Parliament of the United Kingdom, passed under the ministerial tutelage of John Gummer, which created a number of new agencies and set new standards for environmental management.

== See also ==
- English land law
- UK environmental law
- Hedgerows Regulations 1997
