= Local Government etc. (Scotland) Act 1994 =

Act of the Parliament of the United Kingdom

Local Government etc. (Scotland) Act 1994 (Note: Section 184(1).)
- Act of Parliament
- Parliament of the United Kingdom
- Long title: An Act to make provision with respect to local government and the functions of local authorities; to make amendments in relation to local government finance, local authority accounts and the records of local authorities; to establish a Strathclyde Passenger Transport Authority for the purposes of the Transport Act 1968; to provide for the establishment of new water and sewerage authorities; to provide for the establishment of a council to represent the interests of customers and potential customers of those new authorities; to provide for the vesting in those new authorities of the property, rights and liabilities of the Central Scotland Water Development Board and of such property, rights and liabilities of regional and islands councils as those councils have as water authorities, as providers of sewerage and in relation to dealing with the contents of sewers; to provide for the dissolution of that Board; to cancel certain obligations to contribute towards expenses which have been incurred by local authorities in making provision for sewerage or disposal of sewage in rural localities; to create an office of Principal Reporter and transfer to him the functions of reporters to children’s hearings; to establish a body to facilitate the performance by the Principal Reporter of his functions; to amend the Social Work (Scotland) Act 1968 in relation to children’s hearings; to amend the procedure for making byelaws under section 121 of the Civic Government (Scotland) Act 1982; to transfer to local authorities responsibility for fixing and reviewing polling districts and polling places in Parliamentary elections; to amend section 21 of the Self-Governing Schools etc. (Scotland) Act 1989; to amend the law relating to roads and the placing of traffic signs on roads; to make amendments in relation to valuation and rating; to abolish the Scottish Valuation Advisory Council; to empower the Strathclyde Passenger Transport Authority to guarantee certain obligations; to empower local authorities to make grants to ethnic minorities; to confer on local authorities the function of promoting economic development; to provide for the establishment of area tourist boards; to make amendments in relation to lieutenancies; all as respects Scotland; and for connected purposes.
- Citation: 1994 c. 39
- Introduced by: Ian Lang (Commons)
- Territorial extent: Scotland (Note: Section 184(4).)

Dates
- Royal assent: 3 November 1994
- Commencement: 1 April 1996 (Note: Section 184(2).)
Other legislation
Amends	Explosives Act 1875; Local Government Act 1948; Deer (Scotland) Act 1959; Public Works Loans Act 1964; Local Government (Scotland) Act 1966; Plant Health Act 1967; Sewerage (Scotland) Act 1968; Employers' Liability (Compulsory Insurance) Act 1969; Local Government (Scotland) Act 1973; House of Commons Disqualification Act 1975; Lotteries and Amusements Act 1976; Refuse Disposal (Amenity) Act 1978; Education (Scotland) Act 1980; Water (Scotland) Act 1980; Zoo Licensing Act 1981; Public Passenger Vehicles Act 1981; Litter Act 1983; Foster Children (Scotland) Act 1984; Cinemas Act 1985; Housing Associations Act 1985; Airports Act 1986; Debtors (Scotland) Act 1987; Fire Safety and Safety of Places of Sport Act 1987; Access to Personal Files Act 1987; Law Reform (Miscellaneous Provisions) (Scotland) Act 1990; Social Security Contributions and Benefits Act 1992; Social Security Administration Act 1992
Repeals/revokes	Rural Water Supplies and Sewerage Act 1955
Amended by	Merchant Shipping Act 1995; Goods Vehicles (Licensing of Operators) Act 1995; Gas Act 1995; Planning (Consequential Provisions) (Scotland) Act 1997; Lieutenancies Act 1997; Powers of Criminal Courts (Sentencing) Act 2000; Scottish Public Services Ombudsman Act 2002; Local Governance (Scotland) Act 2004; Parliamentary Voting System and Constituencies Act 2011; Scottish Elections (Reform) Act 2020; Tobacco and Vapes Act 2026

Status: Amended

Text of statute as originally enacted

Revised text of statute as amended

Text of the Local Government etc. (Scotland) Act 1994 as in force today (including any amendments) within the United Kingdom, from legislation.gov.uk.

The Local Government etc. (Scotland) Act 1994 (c. 39) is an act of the Parliament of the United Kingdom that created the current local government structure of 32 unitary authorities covering the whole of Scotland.

It abolished the two-tier structure of regions and districts created by the Local Government (Scotland) Act 1973 which had previously covered Scotland except for the islands council areas.

The act came into effect on 1 April 1996, beginning with the 1995 Scottish local elections.

The act authorised the Secretary of State to cap councils' budgets, but this was not acted on for the first set of budgets in 1995-1996.

== Initial proposals ==
The Secretary of State for Scotland, Ian Lang outlined proposed areas in a statement to the Commons on 8 July 1993. This outlined 25 unitary authorities (apart from the 3 Island Areas), as follows

- City of Aberdeen: existing Aberdeen District plus Westhill area of Gordon District
- Aberdeenshire: Banff and Buchan District, Gordon District less Westhill area, Kincardine and Deeside District less southern part of former County of Kincardineshire
- Angus and Mearns: Angus District, the Monifieth and Sidlaw areas of Dundee District and the southern part of former County of Kincardineshire from Kincardine and Deeside District less
- Argyll and Bute: Argyll and Bute District, western part of Dumbarton District (including Helensburgh)
- Berwickshire and East Lothian: Berwickshire District, East Lothian District less Musselburgh/Fisherrow, Preston/Levenhall areas
- The Borders: Tweeddale District, Ettrick and Lauderdale District, Roxburgh District
- Clackmannan and Falkirk: Clackmannan District, Falkirk District, Kincardine Bridge area of Dunfermline District
- Dumbarton and Clydebank: Clydebank District, Dumbarton District (less Helensburgh area)
- Dumfries and Galloway: Dumfries and Galloway Region
- City of Dundee: Dundee District less Monifieth and Sidlaw areas
- City of Edinburgh: Edinburgh District
- East Dunbartonshire: Bearsden and Milngavie District, Strathkelvin District less area around Chryston formerly in the county of Lanarkshire
- East Renfrewshire: Eastwood District, and the Barrhead area and Paisley suburbs in East Renfrewshire constituency from Renfrew District
- Fife: Fife Region
- City of Glasgow: Glasgow District less Toryglen/King's Park, Rutherglen/Fernhill and Cambuslang/Halfway areas
- Highland: Highland Region
- The Lothians: Midlothian District, West Lothian District, the Musselburgh/Fisherrow, Preston/Levenhall areas of East Lothian District
- Moray: Moray District
- North Ayrshire: Cunninghame District, Cumnock and Doon Valley District, Kilmarnock and Loudoun District
- North Lanarkshire: Cumbernauld and Kilsyth District, Monklands District, Motherwell District, the area around Chryston formerly in the county of Lanarkshire from Strathkelvin District
- Perthshire and Kinross: Perth and Kinross District
- South Ayrshire: Kyle and Carrick District
- South Lanarkshire: Clydesdale District, Hamilton District, East Kilbride District, the Toryglen/King's Park, Rutherglen/Fernhill and Cambuslang/Halfway areas from Glasgow District
- Stirling: Stirling District
- West Renfrewshire: Inverclyde District, Renfrew District less the Barrhead area and Paisley suburbs in East Renfrewshire constituency

== New local government areas ==
Schedule I of the act defined the new local government areas in terms of the existing districts and regions. Islands council areas had been unitary council areas since implementation of the 1973 act, and Section 3 of the 1994 act provided that the existing islands areas were to continue to be local government areas.

Areas established by the Act (Names for some of the council areas have changed since the Act was passed.)
Region or islands council area	New unitary council area or areas	District or districts incorporated or partly incorporated
Borders	Borders; Became Scottish Borders	Berwickshire, Ettrick and Lauderdale, Roxburgh and Tweeddale
Central	Clackmannan; Became Clackmannanshire	Clackmannan
Central	Falkirk	Falkirk
Central	Stirling	Stirling
Dumfries and Galloway	Dumfries and Galloway	Annandale and Eskdale, Nithsdale, Stewartry and Wigtown
Fife	Fife	Dunfermline, Kirkcaldy and North East Fife
Grampian	Aberdeenshire	Banff and Buchan, Gordon and Kincardine and Deeside
Grampian	City of Aberdeen; Became Aberdeen City	City of Aberdeen
Grampian	Moray	Moray
Highland	Highland	Badenoch and Strathspey, Caithness, Inverness, Lochaber, Nairn, Ross and Cromarty, Skye and Lochalsh and Sutherland
Lothian	East Lothian	East Lothian
Lothian	City of Edinburgh	City of Edinburgh
Lothian	Midlothian	Midlothian
Lothian	West Lothian	West Lothian
Orkney	Orkney Islands	Not applicable
Shetland	Shetland Islands	Not applicable
Strathclyde	Argyll and Bute	Argyll and Bute and part of Dumbarton (Helensburgh (7) regional electoral division and part of Vale of Leven (8) regional electoral division)
Strathclyde	Dumbarton and Clydebank; Became West Dunbartonshire	Clydebank and part of Dumbarton (Dumbarton (6) regional electoral division and part of Vale of Leven (8) regional electoral division)
Strathclyde	East Ayrshire	Kilmarnock and Loudoun and Cumnock and Doon Valley
Strathclyde	East Dunbartonshire	Bearsden and Milngavie and part of Strathkelvin (Kirkintilloch (43), Strathkelvin North (44) and Bishopbriggs (45) regional electoral divisions and South Lenzie/Waterside district ward)
Strathclyde	East Renfrewshire	Eastwood and part of Renfrew (Barrhead (79) regional electoral division)
Strathclyde	City of Glasgow; Became Glasgow City	Part of City of Glasgow (all except Rutherglen/Fernhill (37) and Cambuslang/Halfway (38) regional electoral divisions, and part of King's Park/Toryglen (35) regional electoral division)
Strathclyde	Inverclyde	Inverclyde
Strathclyde	North Ayrshire	Cunninghame
Strathclyde	North Lanarkshire	Cumbernauld and Kilsyth, Monklands, Motherwell and part of Strathkelvin (part of Chryston (46) regional electoral division (all except South Lenzie/Waterside district ward))
Strathclyde	Renfrewshire	Part of Renfrew (all except Barrhead (79) regional electoral division)
Strathclyde	South Ayrshire	Kyle and Carrick
Strathclyde	South Lanarkshire	Clydesdale, East Kilbride, Hamilton and part of City of Glasgow (Rutherglen/Fernhill (37) and Cambuslang/Halfway (38) regional electoral divisions, and part of King's Park/Toryglen (35) regional electoral division)
Tayside	Angus	Angus and part of City of Dundee (Monifieth (30) regional electoral division and part of Sidlaw (31) regional electoral division)
Tayside	City of Dundee; Became Dundee City	Part of City of Dundee (all except Monifieth (30) regional electoral division and part of Sidlaw (31) regional electoral division)
Tayside	Perth and Kinross	Perth and Kinross and part of City of Dundee (part of Sidlaw (31) regional electoral division)
Western Isles	Western Isles; Became Na h-Eileanan Siar	Not applicable

== Area councils ==
Each area established by the act was to be governed by an elected council. The council's title was simply the name of the area followed by the word "Council": Argyll and Bute Council, Aberdeen City Council and so on. Each area was divided into wards with each ward returning a single councillor. The councillors were required to elect a convener, and could choose to elect a deputy convener. In the four city areas (Aberdeen, Dundee, Edinburgh and Glasgow) the convener's title was to be Lord Provost. In the other council areas the convener was to be "known by such title as the council may determine", other than Lord Provost. In 1998 sixteen councils were using the title "provost", the remaining twelve having conveners.

Area councils were obliged to make a draft decentralisation scheme by 1 April 1997. The scheme could provide for:

- The holding of meetings of the council (or any committee or sub-committee) at particular places within the council area
- The establishment of committees for particular areas and the delegation to them of specified functions
- The location of council offices within the area
- The provision of facilities for accessing advice on council services at particular places within the council area

The plan was to include dates at which the various proposals were to be carried out. Having made the draft plan there was to be an eight-week period in which the area council was to consult with the relevant community councils and invite the public to make observations. The decentralisation scheme could then be adopted in original or modified form.

== Community councils ==
Community councils established by district councils under the 1973 act were to continue to exist. The area councils took on the powers of the abolished districts to make or amend schemes for the establishment of communities.

== Water supply and sewerage ==
Part II of the act reorganised water supply and sewerage services, previously the responsibility of regional councils. Three water authorities were established, each with a defined water area and sewerage area (which were not necessarily identical). The water and sewerage areas were defined in schedule 8, as follows:

Water and sewerage areas established by the act
Water authority	Water area	Constituent areas	Sewerage area	Constituent areas
East of Scotland	Eastern	Lothian Region, Borders Region, Fife Region, Central Region, The former county of Kinross, that part of the former counties of Stirling and Dunbarton which lay within both Strathclyde Region and the region of the former Mid-Scotland Water Board, Craigmaddie Loch (which had been transferred from Stirling District and Central Region to Strathkelvin District and Strathclyde Region on 1 April 1977)	Eastern	Lothian Region, Borders Region, Fife Region, Central Region, the former county of Kinross
North of Scotland	Northern	Highland Region, Grampian Region, Tayside Region except the former county of Kinross, the Islands Areas	Northern	Highland Region, Grampian Region, Tayside Region except the former county of Kinross, the Islands Areas
West of Scotland	Western	Strathclyde Region except the parts included in the Eastern Water Area, Dumfries and Galloway Region	Western	Strathclyde Region, Dumfries and Galloway Region

The act also established a Scottish Water and Sewerage Customers Council. The three water authorities were merged in 2002 to form Scottish Water.

== Other functions ==
The reorganisation of local government areas also led to changes in policing, fire services, public transport and tourism promotion. These had been organised in 1975 to correspond to one or more regions.

- The Police (Scotland) Act 1967 was amended to allow for the reconstitution of police areas and appointment of joint authorities.
- Similarly fire services and authorities were reconstituted.
- The Secretary of State for Scotland was to designate an area and constitution for the Strathclyde Passenger Transport Authority.
- Area tourist boards were to be established by the Secretary of State.
- Civic licensing – the Civic Government (Scotland) Act 1982 introduced a codified framework of regulation of activities such as taxis, street traders, public entertainment and so on. After the introduction of the 1994 act, the "licensing authority" became the new unitary council for each area.

== See also ==
- Subdivisions of Scotland
