= Local Government (Scotland) Act 1973 =

Act of the Parliament of the United Kingdom

Local Government (Scotland) Act 1973 (Note: Section 238(1).)
- Act of Parliament
- Parliament of the United Kingdom
- Long title: An Act to make provision with respect to local government and the functions of local authorities in Scotland; to amend Part II of the Transport Act 1968; and for connected purposes.
- Citation: 1973 c. 65
- Territorial extent: Scotland (Note: Section 238(3).)

Dates
- Royal assent: 25 January 1973
- Commencement: 12 November 1973 (Note: The Local Government (Scotland) Act 1973 (Commencement No. 1) Order 1973.); 20 December 1973 (Note: The Local Government (Scotland) Act 1973 (Commencement No. 2) Order 1973.); 15 February 1974; 1 April 1974; 7 May 1974; 16 May 1974; 16 May 1975; (Note: Section 238(2).)
Other legislation
Amends	Light Railways Act 1896; Children and Young Persons (Scotland) Act 1937; Civic Restaurants Act 1947; Prevention of Damage by Pests Act 1949; Rating and Valuation (Scotland) Act 1952; Deer (Scotland) Act 1959; Plant Health Act 1967; New Towns (Scotland) Act 1968; Sewerage (Scotland) Act 1968; Transport Act 1968
Repeals/revokes	Burgh Harbours (Scotland) Act 1853; Highland Roads and Bridges Act 1862; Cattle-sheds in Burghs Act 1866; Convention of Royal Burghs (Scotland) Act 1879; Roads and Streets in Police Burghs (Scotland) Act 1891; Public Libraries (Scotland) Act 1894; Convention of Royal Burghs (Scotland) Act 1879, Amendment Act 1895; Orkney and Zetland Small Piers and Harbours Act 1896; Public Libraries (Scotland) Act 1899; Town Councils (Scotland) Act 1900; House Letting and Rating (Scotland) Act 1911; Street Collections Regulation (Scotland) Act 1915; House Letting and Rating (Scotland) Act 1920; Public Libraries (Scotland) Act 1920; Roads and Streets in Police Burghs (Scotland) Act 1925; Local Authorities (Publicity) Act 1931; Health Resorts and Watering Places Act 1936; Association of County Councils (Scotland) Act 1946; Local Government (Scotland) Act 1951; Local Authorities (Expenditure on Special Purposes) (Scotland) Act 1961; Local Government (Scotland) Act 1947 (Amendment) Act 1965; National Mod (Scotland) Act 1969; Local Authorities (Qualification of Members) Act 1971; Rate Rebate Act 1973
Amended by	List: Consumer Credit Act 1974; Control of Pollution Act 1974; Statute Law (Repeals) Act 1976; Statute Law (Repeals) Act 1977; Statute Law (Repeals) Act 1978; Statute Law (Repeals) Act 1981; Representation of the People Act 1983; Water Act 1983; Litter Act 1983; Road Traffic Regulation Act 1984; Foster Children (Scotland) Act 1984; Cinemas Act 1985; Housing (Consequential Provisions) Act 1985; Weights and Measures Act 1985; Statute Law (Repeals) Act 1986; Parliamentary Constituencies Act 1986; Housing (Scotland) Act 1987; Consumer Protection Act 1987; Road Traffic (Consequential Provisions) Act 1988; Local Government and Housing Act 1989; Statute Law (Repeals) Act 1989; Agricultural Holdings (Scotland) Act 1991; Clean Air Act 1993; Radioactive Substances Act 1993; Statute Law (Repeals) Act 1993; Police and Magistrates' Courts Act 1994; Local Government etc. (Scotland) Act 1994; Deregulation and Contracting Out Act 1994; Requirements of Writing (Scotland) Act 1995; Goods Vehicles (Licensing of Operators) Act 1995; Environment Act 1995; Children (Scotland) Act 1995; Criminal Procedure (Consequential Provisions) (Scotland) Act 1995; Local Government Elections (Changes to the Franchise and Qualification of Members) Regulations 1995; Audit (Miscellaneous Provisions) Act 1996; Deer (Scotland) Act 1996; Local Government (Transitional and Consequential Provisions and Revocations) (Scotland) Order 1996; Local Government (Access to Information) (Scotland) Order 1996; Local Government (Gaelic Names) (Scotland) Act 1997; Planning (Consequential Provisions) (Scotland) Act 1997; Local Government and Rating Act 1997; Flood Prevention and Land Drainage (Scotland) Act 1997; Social Security Administration (Fraud) Act 1997; Statute Law (Repeals) Act 1998; Health Act 1999; Scotland Act 1998 (Consequential Modifications) (No.2) Order 1999; Ethical Standards in Public Life etc. (Scotland) Act 2000; Police Reform Act 2002; Local Government in Scotland Act 2003; Building (Scotland) Act 2003; Mental Health (Care and Treatment) (Scotland) Act 2003; Communications Act 2003 (Consequential Amendments) Order 2003; Local Governance (Scotland) Act 2004; Statute Law (Repeals) Act 2004; Fire (Scotland) Act 2005; Transport (Scotland) Act 2005; Licensing (Scotland) Act 2005; Local Electoral Administration and Registration Services (Scotland) Act 2006; Tourist Boards (Scotland) Act 2006; Planning etc. (Scotland) Act 2006; Electoral Administration Act 2006; Non-Domestic Rating (Electronic Communications) (Scotland) Order 2006; Fire (Scotland) Act 2005 (Consequential Modifications and Savings) Order 2006; Bankruptcy and Diligence etc. (Scotland) Act 2007; Local Governance (Scotland) Act 2004 (Allowances and Expenses) Regulations 2007; Public Health etc. (Scotland) Act 2008; Companies Act 2006 (Consequential Amendments etc) Order 2008; Companies Act 2006 (Consequential Amendments, Transitional Provisions and Savings) Order 2009; Public Services Reform (Scotland) Act 2010; Local Government Investments (Scotland) Regulations 2010; Treaty of Lisbon (Changes in Terminology) Order 2011; Police and Fire Reform (Scotland) Act 2012; Treaty of Lisbon (Changes in Terminology or Numbering) Order 2012; European Union (Amendments in respect of the Accession of Croatia) (Scotland) Regulations 2013; Children's Hearings (Scotland) Act 2011 (Modification of Primary Legislation) Order 2013; Regulatory Reform (Scotland) Act 2014; Public Bodies (Joint Working) (Scotland) Act 2014; Bankruptcy and Debt Advice (Scotland) Act 2014; Community Empowerment (Scotland) Act 2015; Courts Reform (Scotland) Act 2014 (Consequential and Supplemental Provisions) Order 2015; Land Reform (Scotland) Act 2016; Burial and Cremation (Scotland) Act 2016; Bankruptcy (Scotland) Act 2016; Planning (Scotland) Act 2019; Scottish Elections (Franchise and Representation) Act 2020; Coronavirus (Scotland) Act 2020; Scottish Elections (Reform) Act 2020; Scottish Local Government Elections (Candidacy Rights of Foreign Nationals) Act 2022; Animal Health and Welfare (Scotland) Act 2006 (Consequential Provisions) Order 2022; First-tier Tribunal for Scotland (Transfer of Functions of Valuation Appeals Committees) Regulations 2023; Scottish Local Government Elections Amendment (Denmark) Regulations 2024; Scottish Elections (Representation and Reform) Act 2025; Natural Environment (Scotland) Act 2026

Status: Amended

Text of statute as originally enacted

Revised text of statute as amended

Text of the Local Government (Scotland) Act 1973 as in force today (including any amendments) within the United Kingdom, from legislation.gov.uk.

The Local Government (Scotland) Act 1973 (c. 65) is an act of the Parliament of the United Kingdom that altered local government in Scotland on 16 May 1975.

The act followed and largely implemented the report of the Royal Commission on Local Government in Scotland in 1969 (the Wheatley Report), and it made the most far-reaching changes to Scottish local government in centuries. It swept away the counties, burghs and districts established by the Local Government (Scotland) Act 1947 (10 & 11 Geo. 6. c. 65), which were largely based on units of local government dating from the Middle Ages, and replaced them with a uniform two-tier system of regional and district councils (except in the islands, which were given unitary, all-purpose councils).

In England and Wales, the Local Government Act 1972 established a similar system of two-tier administrative county and district councils.

== The act ==
The act abolished previous existing local government structures and created a two-tier system of regions and districts on the mainland and a unitary system in the islands. The former counties remained in use for land registration purposes.

The act also established the Local Government Boundary Commission for Scotland, with the remit to make proposals to the Secretary of State for effecting changes which it thought desirable in the interests of effective and convenient local government. The Act also abolished the use of Fiars Prices for valuing grain.

== The new local government areas ==
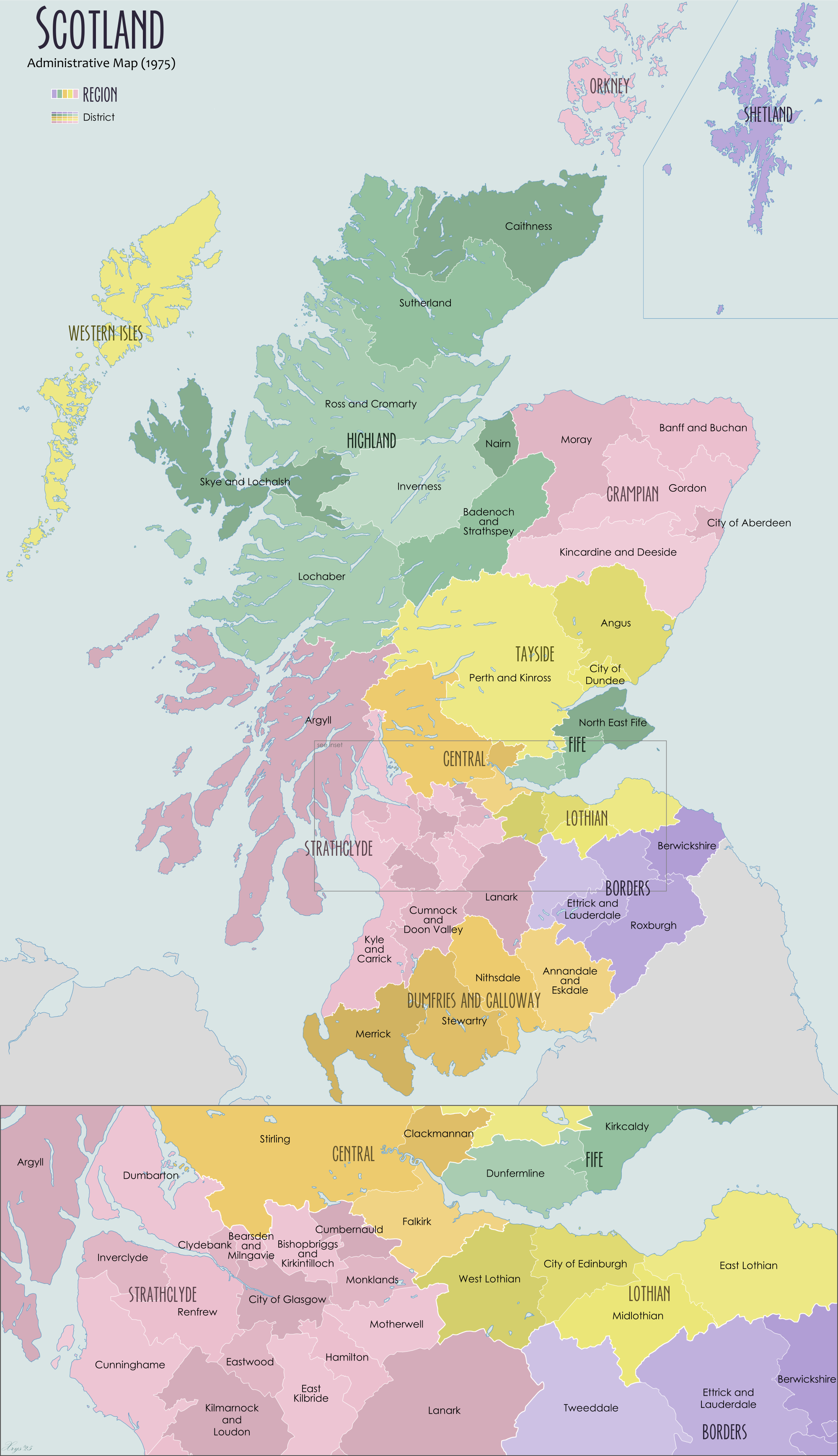

=== Regions ===
Region	Composed of
Highland	The county of Caithness.; The county of Inverness (except the districts of Barra, Harris, North Uist, South Uist).; The county of Nairn.; The county of Ross and Cromarty (except the burgh of Stornoway; the district of Lewis).; The county of Sutherland.; In the county of Argyll—the district of Ardnamurchan; the electoral divisions of Ballachulish, Kinlochleven.; In the county of Moray—the burgh of Grantown-on-Spey; the district of Cromdale.
Grampian	The county of the city of Aberdeen.; The county of Aberdeen.; The county of Banff.; The county of Kincardine.; The county of Moray (except the burgh of Grantown-on-Spey; the district of Cromdale).
Tayside	The county of the city of Dundee.; The county of Angus.; The county of Kinross.; The county of Perth (except the burghs of Callander, Doune, Dunblane; the Western district (except the electoral division of Ardoch); the parish of Muckhart).
Fife	The county of Fife.
Lothian	The county of the city of Edinburgh.; The county of East Lothian.; The county of Midlothian (except the electoral division of Heriot and Stow).; The county of West Lothian (except the burgh of Bo'ness; the district of Bo'ness).
Borders	The county of Berwick.; The county of Peebles.; The county of Roxburgh.; The county of Selkirk.; In the county of Midlothian—the electoral division of Heriot and Stow.
Central	The county of Clackmannan.; The county of Stirling (except the burgh of Kilsyth; Western No. 3 district; the electoral division of Kilsyth West; the polling district of Kilsyth East (Banton)).; In the county of Dunbarton—the village of Croftamie.; In the county of Perth—the burghs of Callander, Doune, Dunblane; the Western district (except the electoral division of Ardoch); the parish of Muckhart.; In the county of West Lothian—the burgh of Bo'ness; the district of Bo'ness.
Strathclyde	The county of the city of Glasgow.; The county of Ayr.; The county of Bute.; The county of Dunbarton (except the village of Croftamie).; The county of Lanark.; The county of Renfrew.; The county of Argyll (except the district of Ardnamurchan; the electoral divisions of Ballachulish and Kinlochleven).; In the county of Stirling—the burgh of Kilsyth; Western No. 3 district; the electoral division of Kilsyth West; the polling district of Kilsyth East (Banton).
Dumfries and Galloway	The county of Dumfries.; The county of Kirkcudbright.; The county of Wigtown.

=== Island areas ===
Island area	Composed of
Orkney	The county of Orkney.
Shetland	The county of Zetland.
Western Isles	In the county of Inverness—the districts of Barra, Harris, North Uist, South Uist.; In the county of Ross and Cromarty—the burgh of Stornoway; the district of Lewis.

=== Districts ===
Region	District	Composed of
Highland	Caithness	The county of Caithness.; In the county of Sutherland—the district of Tongue and Farr.
Highland	Sutherland	The county of Sutherland (except the district of Tongue and Farr).; In the county of Ross and Cromarty—the electoral division of Kincardine.
Highland	Ross and Cromarty	In the county of Ross and Cromarty—the burghs of Cromarty, Dingwall, Fortrose, Invergordon, Tain; the districts of Avoch, Dingwall, Fearn, Fortrose, Gairloch, Invergordon, Lochbroom, Lochcarron, Muir of Ord; the electoral division of Edderton and Tain.
Highland	Skye and Lochalsh	In the county of Inverness—the district of Skye.; In the county of Ross and Cromarty—the South West district.
Highland	Lochaber	In the county of Argyll—the district of Ardnamurchan; the electoral divisions of Ballachulish, Kinlochleven.; In the county of Inverness—the burgh of Fort William; the district of Lochaber.
Highland	Inverness	In the county of Inverness—the burgh of Inverness; the districts of Aird, Inverness.
Highland	Badenoch and Strathspey	In the county of Inverness—the burgh of Kingussie; the district of Badenoch.; In the county of Moray—the burgh of Grantown-on-Spey; the district of Cromdale.
Highland	Nairn	The county of Nairn.
Grampian	Moray	The county of Moray (except the burgh of Grantown-on-Spey; the district of Cromdale).; In the county of Banff—the burghs of Aberlour, Buckie, Cullen, Dufftown, Findochty, Keith, Portknockie; the districts of Buckie, Cullen (except the electoral division of Fordyce), Dufftown, Keith.
Grampian	Banff and Buchan	In the county of Banff—the burghs of Aberchirder, Banff, Macduff, Portsoy; the districts of Aberchirder, Banff; the electoral division of Fordyce.; In the county of Aberdeen—the burghs of Fraserburgh, Peterhead, Rosehearty, Turriff; the districts of Deer Turriff; the electoral division of Cruden.
Grampian	Gordon	In the county of Aberdeen—the burghs of Ellon, Huntly, Inverurie, Kintore, Oldmeldrum; the districts of Aberdeen (except the electoral divisions of Bucksburn, Newhills Landward, Old Machar, Stoneywood and the parishes of Drumoak, Dyce, Peterculter), Alford, Ellon (except the electoral division of Cruden), Garioch, Huntly.
Grampian	City of Aberdeen	The county of the city of Aberdeen.; In the county of Aberdeen—the electoral divisions of Bucksburn, Newhills Landward, Old Machar, Stoneywood; the parishes of Dyce, Peterculter.; In the county of Kincardine—the electoral division of Nigg.
Grampian	Kincardine and Deeside	In the county of Aberdeen—the burgh of Ballater; the district of Deeside; the parish of Drumoak.; In the county of Kincardine—the burghs of Banchory, Inverbervie, Laurencekirk, Stonehaven; the districts of Laurencekirk, St. Cyrus, Stonehaven, Upper Deeside; the electoral divisions of Banchory-Devenick, Maryculter.
Tayside	Angus	In the county of Angus—the burghs of Arbroath, Brechin, Carnoustie, Forfar, Kirriemuir, Montrose; the districts of Brechin, Carnoustie, Forfar, Kirriemuir, Montrose; the parish of Newtyle.
Tayside	City of Dundee	The county of the city of Dundee.; In the county of Angus—the burgh of Monifieth; the district of Monifieth (except the electoral division of Newtyle and Kettins).; In the county of Perth—the electoral division of Longforgan.
Tayside	Perth and Kinross	The county of Kinross.; In the county of Angus—the parish of Kettins.; In the county of Perth—the burghs of Aberfeldy, Abernethy, Alyth, Auchterarder, Blairgowrie and Rattray, Coupar Angus, Crieff, Perth, Pitlochry; the districts Central (except the parish of Muckhart), Eastern Highland, Perth (except the electoral division of Longforgan); the electoral division of Ardoch.
Fife	Kirkcaldy	In the county of Fife—the burghs of Buckhaven and Methil, Burntisland, Kinghorn, Kirkcaldy, Leslie, Leven, Markinch; the districts of Glenrothes, Kirkcaldy (except that part of the electoral division of Auchtertool within the Gray Park polling district), Wemyss; the electoral divisions of Auchterderran, Denend, Kinglassie, New Carden.
Fife	North East Fife	In the county of Fife—the burghs of Auchtermuchty, Crail, Cupar, Elie and Earlsferry, Falkland, Kilrenny, Anstruther, Easter and Wester, Ladybank, Newburgh, Newport-on-Tay, Pittenweem, St. Andrews, St. Monance, Tayport; the districts of Cupar, St. Andrews.
Fife	Dunfermline	In the county of Fife—the burghs of Cowdenbeath, Culross, Dunfermline, Inverkeithing, Lochgelly; the districts of Dunfermline, Lochgelly (except the electoral divisions of Auchterderran, Denend, Kinglassie, New Carden); that part of the electoral division of Auchtertool within the Gray Park polling district.
Lothian	West Lothian	In the county of West Lothian—the burghs of Armadale, Bathgate, Linlithgow, Whitburn; the districts of Linlithgow, Torphichen and Bathgate, Uphall, Whitburn and Livingston; the electoral divisions of Abercorn, Winchburgh East and Winchburgh West.; In the county of Midlothian—the districts of East Calder, West Calder.
Lothian	City of Edinburgh	The county of the city of Edinburgh.; In the county of West Lothian—the burgh of Queensferry; the district of Kirkliston and Winchburgh (except the electoral divisions of Abercorn, Winchburgh East and Winchburgh West).; In the county of Midlothian—the district of Currie and the parish of Cramond.
Lothian	Midlothian	In the county of Midlothian—the burghs of Bonnyrigg and Lasswade, Dalkeith Loanhead, Penicuik; the districts of Gala Water (except the electoral division of Heriot and Stow), Lasswade, Musselburgh (except the parish of Inveresk), Newbattle, Penicuik.
Lothian	East Lothian	The county of East Lothian.; In the county of Midlothian—the burgh of Musselburgh; the parish of Inveresk.
Central	Clackmannan	The county of Clackmannan.; In the county of Perth—the parish of Muckhart.
Central	Stirling	In the county of Dunbarton—the village of Croftamie; In the county of Perth—the burghs of Callander, Doune, Dunblane; the Western district (except the electoral division of Ardoch).; In the county of Stirling—the burghs of Bridge of Allan, Stirling; the districts Central No. 1, Western No. 1. Western No. 2.
Central	Falkirk	In the county of Stirling—the burghs of Denny and Dunipace, Falkirk, Grangemouth; the districts Eastern No. 1, Eastern No. 2, Eastern No. 3, Central No. 2 (except the electoral division of Kilsyth West; the polling district of Kilsyth East (Banton)).; In the county of West Lothian—the burgh of Bo'ness; the district of Bo'ness.
Borders	Tweeddale	The county of Peebles.
Borders	Ettrick and Lauderdale	The county of Selkirk.; In the county of Berwick—the burgh of Lauder; the West district (except the electoral divisions of Gordon, Hume and Nenthorn, Westruther).; In the county of Midlothian—the electoral division of Heriot and Stow.; In the county of Roxburgh—the burgh of Melrose; the district of Melrose (except that part of the parish of Roxburgh which lies within this district).
Borders	Roxburgh	In the county of Berwick—the parish of Nenthorn.; In the county of Roxburgh—the burghs of Hawick, Jedburgh, Kelso; the districts of Hawick, Jedburgh, Kelso; that part of the parish of Roxburgh within the district of Melrose.
Borders	Berwickshire	In the county of Berwick—the burghs of Coldstream, Duns, Eyemouth; the East district, the Middle district; the electoral divisions of Gordon, Westruther; the parish of Hume.
Strathclyde	Argyll	In the county of Argyll—the burghs of Campbeltown, Dunoon, Inveraray, Lochgilphead, Oban, Tobermory; the districts of Cowal, Islay, Jura and Colonsay, Kintyre, Mid Argyll, Mull, North Lorn (except the electoral divisions of Ballachulish, Kinlochleven), South Lorn, Tiree and Coll.; In the county of Bute—the burgh of Rothesay; the district of Bute.
Strathclyde	Dumbarton	In the county of Dunbarton—the burghs of Dumbarton, Cove and Kilcreggan, Helensburgh; the districts of Helensburgh, Vale of Leven; the electoral divisions of Bowling, Dunbarton.
Strathclyde	City of Glasgow	The county of the city of Glasgow.; In the county of Lanark—the burgh of Rutherglen; in the Eighth district, the electoral divisions of Bankhead, Cambuslang Central, Cambuslang North, Hallside, Rutherglen, and those parts of Cambuslang South and Carmunnock electoral divisions lying outwith the designated area of East Kilbride New Town; in the Ninth district, the electoral divisions of Baillieston, Garrowhill, Mount Vernon and Carmyle, Springboig.
Strathclyde	Clydebank	In the county of Dunbarton—the burgh of Clydebank; the district of Old Kilpatrick (except the electoral divisions of Bowling, Dunbarton, and that part of the electoral division of Hardgate lying within the parish of New Kilpatrick).
Strathclyde	Bearsden and Milngavie	In the county of Dunbarton—the burghs of Bearsden, Milngavie; that part of the electoral division of Hardgate lying within the parish of New Kilpatrick.
Strathclyde	Bishopbriggs and Kirkintilloch	In the county of Dunbarton—the burgh of Kirkintilloch; those parts of the electoral divisions of Twechar and Waterside lying outwith the designated area of Cumbernauld New Town.; In the county of Lanark—the burgh of Bishopbriggs; the electoral divisions of Chryston, Stepps.; In the county of Stirling—the Western No. 3 district.
Strathclyde	Cumbernauld	In the county of Dunbarton—the burgh of Cumbernauld; the electoral division of Croy and Dullatur and those parts of the electoral divisions of Twechar and Waterside lying within the designated area of Cumbernauld New Town.; In the county of Stirling—the burgh of Kilsyth; the electoral division of Kilsyth West; the polling district of Kilsyth East (Banton).
Strathclyde	Monklands	In the county of Lanark—the burghs of Airdrie, Coatbridge; the Ninth district (except the electoral divisions of Baillieston, Chryston, Garrowhill, Mount Vernon and Carmyle, Springboig, Stepps); in the Seventh district, the electoral division of Shottskirk.
Strathclyde	Motherwell	In the county of Lanark—the burgh of Motherwell and Wishaw; the Sixth district (except the electoral divisions of Bothwell and Uddingston South, Uddingston North), the Seventh district (except the electoral division of Shottskirk).
Strathclyde	Hamilton	In the county of Lanark—the burgh of Hamilton; the Fourth district (except the electoral division of Avondale); in the Sixth district, the electoral divisions of Bothwell and Uddingston South, Uddingston North; in the Eighth district, the electoral divisions of Blantyre, Stonefield, and that part of High Blantyre electoral division lying outwith the designated area of East Kilbride New Town.
Strathclyde	East Kilbride	In the county of Lanark—the burgh of East Kilbride; in the Fourth district, the electoral division of Avondale; in the Eighth district, those parts of High Blantyre, Cambuslang South, and Carmunnock electoral divisions lying within the designated area of East Kilbride New Town.
Strathclyde	Eastwood	In the county of Renfrew—the First district.
Strathclyde	Lanark	In the county of Lanark—the burghs of Biggar, Lanark; the First, Second, Third districts.
Strathclyde	Renfrew	In the county of Renfrew—the burghs of Barrhead, Johnstone, Paisley, Renfrew; the Second, Third, Fourth districts.
Strathclyde	Inverclyde	In the county of Renfrew—the burghs of Gourock, Greenock, Port Glasgow; the Fifth district.
Strathclyde	Cunninghame	In the county of Ayr—the burghs of Ardrossan, Irvine, Kilwinning, Largs, Saltcoats, Stevenston, the districts of Irvine, Kilbirnie, West Kilbride; those parts of the designated area of Irvine New Town within the Ayr and Kilmarnock districts.; In the county of Bute—the burgh of Millport; the districts of Arran, Cumbrae.
Strathclyde	Kilmarnock and Loudoun	In the county of Ayr—the burghs of Darvel, Galston, Kilmarnock, Newmilns and Greenholm, Stewarton; the district of Kilmarnock (except that part of the designated area of Irvine New Town within this district).
Strathclyde	Kyle and Carrick	In the county of Ayr—the burghs of Ayr, Girvan, Maybole, Prestwick, Troon; the district of Ayr (except that part of the designated area of Irvine New Town within this district), Girvan, Maybole; that part of the parish of Ayr within the district of Dalmellington; the polling district of Coylton.
Strathclyde	Cumnock and Doon Valley	In the county of Ayr—the burgh of Cumnock and Holmhead; the districts of Cumnock, Dalmellington (except that part of the parish of Ayr within this district; the polling district of Coylton).
Dumfries and Galloway	Merrick	The county of Wigtown.; In the county of Kirkcudbright—the Western district (except the electoral division of Anwoth and Girthon).
Dumfries and Galloway	Stewartry	In the county of Kirkcudbright—the burghs of Castle Douglas, Dalbeattie, Gatehouse of Fleet, Kirkcudbright, New Galloway; the districts of Castle Douglas, Dalbeattie, Glenkens, Kirkcudbright; the electoral division of Anwoth and Girthon.
Dumfries and Galloway	Nithsdale	In the county of Dumfries—the burghs of Dumfries, Sanquhar; the districts of Dumfries (except the parishes of Dalton, Lochmaben), Thornhill, Upper Nithsdale.; In the county of Kirkcudbright—the Eastern district.
Dumfries and Galloway	Annandale and Eskdale	In the county of Dumfries—the burghs of Annan, Langholm, Lockerbie, Lochmaben, Moffat; the districts of Annan, Gretna, Langholm, Lockerbie, Moffat; the parishes of Dalton, Lochmaben.

Several districts were later renamed: Merrick becoming Wigtown, Argyll to Argyll and Bute, Bishopbriggs and Kirkintilloch to Strathkelvin, Cumbernauld to Cumbernauld and Kilsyth, and Lanark to Clydesdale.

== Reaction and aftermath ==
Unlike the Local Government Act 1972 in England and Wales, the 1973 act in Scotland used the term region for the upper tier of the two-tier system. This has caused far less confusion over the identity of the counties in Scotland. The counties still enjoy wide public recognition. Even though they no longer play any direct part in local government, counties are used in many other systems: Royal Mail continued to use them as postal counties, and the Watsonian vice-counties, registration counties and many of the lieutenancy areas of Scotland are based on them.

However, the sheer size of some regions meant that it became cumbersome to administer all functions on a region-wide basis. By 1977 Strathclyde Regional Council had established unelected sub-regional councils, which resembled the county councils that the regional council had replaced.

The two-tier system of local government introduced by the act lasted until 1 April 1996 when the Local Government etc. (Scotland) Act 1994 came into effect, abolishing the regions and districts and replacing them with 32 unitary authorities.

== Amendments ==
=== Scottish Local Government Elections (Candidacy Rights of Foreign Nationals) Act 2022 ===
Scottish Local Government Elections (Candidacy Rights of Foreign Nationals) Act 2022
- Act of the Scottish Parliament
- Scottish Parliament
- Long title: An Act of the Scottish Parliament to give to certain foreign nationals the right to stand as candidates at local government elections in Scotland in accordance with international treaty agreements entered into by the United Kingdom.
- Citation: 2022 asp 4
- Introduced by: John Swinney MSP

Dates
- Royal assent: 2022-07-19

Status: Current legislation

The act was amended to allow foreign nationals who are legally resident in Scotland to stand as candidates in local elections.

== See also ==
- Local Government etc. (Scotland) Act 1994
- Subdivisions of Scotland
