= Business rates in Scotland =

Business rates is the commonly used name of Non-Domestic Rates in Scotland, a tax on occupation of non-domestic property. Rates are a property tax used to fund local services that dates back to the Poor Law.

== History ==
The Poor Law introduced in Scotland in 1579 provided for a poor rate to be levied to fund poor relief. The Poor Law (Scotland) Act 1845 modernized the system, and the Lands Valuation (Scotland) Act 1854 established the foundations of the modern system.

The Valuation and Rating (Scotland) Act 1956 established a system of five-yearly revaluations, undertaken by an Assessor appointed by the local authority.

In 1989, domestic properties were removed from the rating system with the introduction of the Community Charge in Scotland, later to be replaced with Council Tax.

== Scope ==
The Local Government Finance Act 1988 amended the existing rating system in Scotland from 1990 at the same time as introducing a new system of business rates in England and Wales from 1990, and the Local Government Finance Act 1992 made further changes. While the latter two acts applied to the whole of the United Kingdom, as the Scottish system is based on Scots law, it remains fundamentally different from the system in England and Wales.

== See also ==
- Taxation in Scotland
- Local income tax
- Business rates in England
- Taxation in the United Kingdom
- Rates
- Local government in the United Kingdom:Funding
