= Locality budget =

A locality budget is a financial provision for a fund available to a local councillor so that they may apply the funds to address a local issue in the ward or division they represent. They have been advocated as a way in which the role of local councillors can be enhanced to address issues raised in the Local Government White Paper Strong and Strong and Prosperous Communities Communities published by the Department for Communities and Local Government in 2006. That White Paper had claimed that "communities need strategic leadership to help bring together various local agencies and groups in order to build a vision of how to respond to and address a locality’s problems and challenges in a co-ordinated way." This was the authors' interpretation of Michael Lyons concept of "place shapers" as outlined in the Final Report of the Lyons Inquiry, Place-shaping: a shared ambition for the future of local government (2007).

Sometimes locality budgets are called "Ward Budgets" when they relate to Council wards. However, where Councillors represent divisions, as with county councils and some unitary authorities, funds can be given such names as "Councillors' Divisional Fund" as with Nottinghamshire County Council.

== Some councils that implemented locality budgets ==
- Wycombe District Council
- Shepway District Council
- Colchester Borough Council
- Eastbourne Borough Council
- Westminster City Council
