= Business rates in England =

English tax

Business rates in England, or non-domestic rates, are a tax on the occupation of non-domestic property (National Non-Domestic Rates; NNDR). Rates are a property tax with ancient roots that was formerly used to fund local services that was formalised with the Vagabonds Act 1572 and superseded by the Poor Relief Act 1601. The Local Government Finance Act 1988 (c. 41) introduced business rates in England and Wales from 1990, repealing its immediate predecessor, the General Rate Act 1967. The act also introduced business rates in Scotland but as an amendment to the existing system, which had evolved separately to that in the rest of Great Britain. Since the establishment in 1997 of a Welsh Assembly able to pass legislation, the English and Welsh systems have been able to diverge. In 2015, business rates for Wales were devolved.

The Local Government Finance Act 1988, with follow-up legislation, provided a fresh administrative framework for assessing and billing but did not redefine the legal unit of property, the hereditament, that had been developed through rating case law.

Properties are assessed in a rating list with a rateable value, a valuation of their annual rental value on a fixed valuation date using assumptions fixed by statute. Rating lists are created and maintained by the Valuation Office Agency, a UK government executive agency. Rating lists can be altered either to reflect changes in properties, or as valuations are appealed against. New rating lists are normally created every three years. The most recent rating list was published in 2026.

In financial year 2014–15, authorities collected a total of £22.9 billion in business rates, representing 3.53% of the total UK tax income and achieving an average in-year collection rate of 98.1%.

On 1 April 2013 a new system of business rates retention began in England. Before April 2013 all business rate income collected by councils formed a single, national pot, which was then distributed by government in the form of formula grant. Through the Local Government Finance Act 2012, and regulations that followed, the government gave local authorities the power to keep up to half of business rate income and transfer half of it centrally, to central government. The central share is then distributed to councils in the form of revenue support grants. The other half kept by local authorities are then subjected to tariff, levy, top-up and safety payments depending on the financial position of the council. According to the government the change gives financial incentives to councils to grow their local economies and increase their income from business rates. At the same time the new scheme has resulted in more risk and uncertainty.

== History ==
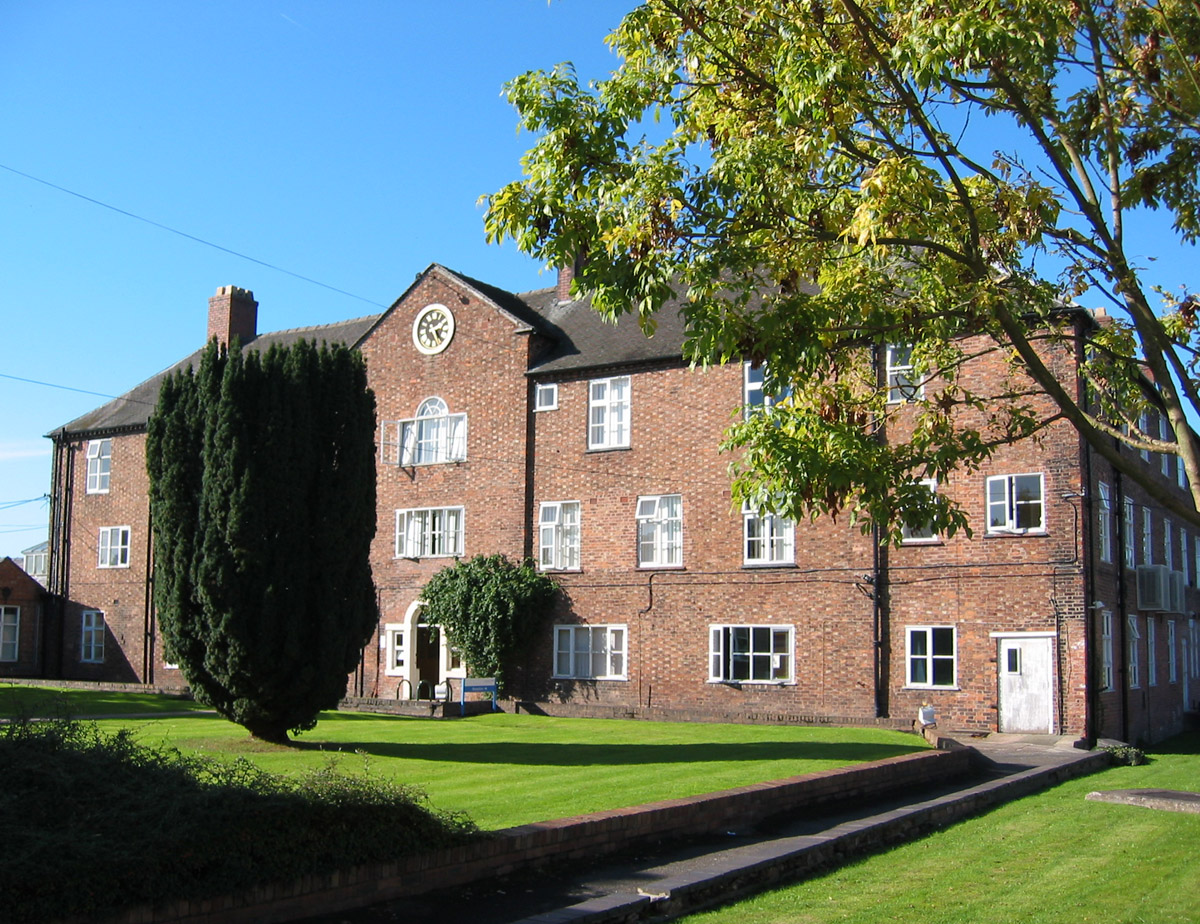
Former workhouse at Nantwich, dating from 1780. Workhouses developed as part of the poor law, which was funded by rates

Business rates are the latest incarnation of a series of taxes for funding local services known as rates, based on property values. The first rate was part of the Vagabonds Act 1572, which established relief for the poor at the local parish level, paid for by inhabitants of the parish. A system of rates to fund local government and services evolved over the next three centuries, including a separate system for London from 1869 to 1963. Changes included a stricter definition of how to value for a rate; the introduction of a valuation list containing the assessed values; the ability to object to the assessed value; and the introduction of the valuation officer, appointed by the Commissioners of Inland Revenue (now HM Revenue & Customs), as the assessor.

The immediate predecessor to business rates was the general rate, established by the General Rate Act 1967. This was a local tax in England and Wales on both domestic and non-domestic property and was based on rental values. It retained the core concept of how to identify a rateable property from the older rating systems, which, along with other features, can still be seen in the modern system. The Local Government Finance Act 1988 (c. 41) repealed the General Rate Act and replaced it with two new taxes from 1 April 1990. The Community Charge, better known as the "poll tax", replaced the rating of domestic property. It was itself later replaced by Council Tax. The remaining non-domestic properties were to be covered by a modernised version of the general rate.

The new non-domestic rating system became known as business rates, or sometimes the universal business rate. It retained from its predecessors the concept of a series of local rating lists, with each property being assessed for a rateable value based on rental values. Rating lists were prepared and maintained by the Valuation Office (reconstituted in 1991 as a UK Government executive agency, the Valuation Office Agency), while billing and collection was the responsibility of local authorities. Previously, local authorities had decided what proportion of rateable values to charge; the new system featured a centrally set multiplier, often referred to as the Uniform Business Rate, by which the basic bill was calculated. The bill could be further modified by various reliefs, including the newly introduced transitional relief, which was designed to smooth large changes in liability due to revaluations. The multiplier was calculated to ensure that, on average, bills rose by no more than the rate of inflation.

A system of rating had also evolved in Scotland, through separate legislation. While in many ways similar, key underlying concepts in the Scottish system differed, as did the administrative scheme. The Local Government Finance Act 1988 renamed the Scottish rates, and imposed the centrally set multiplier, but did not otherwise disturb the Scottish rating legislation.

During the introduction of business rates, criticism focused on the level of the multiplier to be chosen, and on the transitional relief scheme, with organisations such as the Confederation of British Industry calling for a lower multiplier and a relief scheme more to the benefit of its members. In 2007, the Lyons Inquiry into Local Government said there was no significant opposition to the principles of the tax, but that the level was a concern to property-intensive businesses. Due to the overall yield being linked to the Retail Prices Index as a measure of inflation, the contribution of business rates to local government finance has decreased compared to Council Tax and government grants. Many local authorities have called for the rate to be increased, and for the power to set the multiplier to be returned to local control; both suggestions have been opposed by business organisations such as the British Retail Consortium. The Lyons Inquiry rejected the return to local control, and instead proposed giving local authorities the power to levy a local supplement, in consultation with affected businesses; responses from the business sector have ranged from caution to opposition. Following the creation of the National Assembly for Wales in 1999, some of the powers previously exercised by the UK government were devolved to the Welsh Assembly government. The English and Welsh systems were able to diverge slightly, with Wales setting a different Uniform Business rate multiplier, and different reliefs.

== Billing and reliefs ==
For each property in the rating list for their area, the local authority calculates and issues a bill, which it is responsible for collecting, with powers to pursue payment. The rateable value is multiplied by the Uniform Business Rate, referred to in legislation as the non-domestic rating multiplier, to arrive at an annual bill. For example, a rateable value of £10,000 and a multiplier of 40p would produce an annual bill of £4,000. The bill usually requires payment in instalments over the financial year.

=== Business rates multipliers ===
The multiplier is set by central government, and is uniform. Power to set the multiplier in Wales has been devolved to the National Assembly for Wales. A special case exists where a defined special authority can set its own multiplier within centrally defined limits. The only currently qualifying authority is the City of London. The multiplier is increased annually, in April. The increase is capped at the same proportion as the increase in the Retail Prices Index for the month of September the preceding year. When re-valuations take place, the multiplier is adjusted so that the overall change across the country is the same as the Retail Prices Index change.

The introduction of Small Business Rate Relief in 2005 added a supplement to the UBR to fund the relief. The income from business rates currently does not go directly to the local authority (unlike Council Tax); rather, it is pooled centrally and redistributed to the authorities. In financial year 2014–15, authorities in England collected a total of £22.9 billion in business rates, representing 3.53% of the total UK tax income and achieving an average in-year collection rate of 98.1%.

For 2016/17 the multiplier is 49.7 pence and the small business rate multiplier is 48.4 pence. The multiplier for 2017/18 is 47.9 pence, which means that as of that date, this tax has increased in real terms by 37.6% since its inception in 1990. The rateable values are updated to current market values, but the multiplier has increased from 34.8p (or 34.8%) to 47.9p (47.9%).

Business rates multipliers
Year	2025/26	2024/25	2023/24	2022/23	2021/22	2020/21	2019/20	2018/19	2017/18	2016/17	2015/16	2014/15	2013/14	2012/13	2011/12	2010/11	2009/10	2008/09	2007/08	2006/07	2005/06
Small business multiplier	49.9p	49.9p	49.9p	49.9p	49.9p	49.9p	49.1p	48.0p	46.6p	48.4p	48.0p	47.1p	46.2p	45.0p	42.6p	40.7p	48.1p	45.8p	44.1p	42.6p	41.5p
Higher multiplier	55.5p	54.6p	51.2p	51.2p	51.2p	51.2p	50.4p	49.3p	47.9p	49.7p	49.3p	48.2p	47.1p	45.8p	43.3p	41.4p	48.5p	46.2p	44.4p	43.3p	42.2p
Year	2004/05	2003/04	2002/03	2001/02	2000/01	1999/00	1998/99	1997/98	1996/97	1995/96	1994/95	1993/94	1992/93	1991/92	1990/91						
Multiplier	45.6p	44.4p	43.7p	43.0p	41.6p	48.9p	47.4p	45.8p	44.9p	43.2p	42.3p	41.6p	40.2p	38.6p	34.8p						

=== Reliefs ===
The bill may also be reduced by having one or more reliefs applied to it, such as reliefs for empty properties, or for charities. Reliefs are administered by the local authority and they do not affect the rateable value of a property. While some are mandatory, others are at the discretion of the local authority, who also have to bear, in whole or in part, the costs of some reliefs. In addition to specific reliefs, a hardship relief is available at the discretion of the local authority. A relief on non-agricultural business on agricultural land or former agricultural buildings was removed with effect from 14 August 2006.

==== Charitable and non-profit making organisation relief ====
There are three types of relief to which a charity may be entitled: mandatory relief on occupied property, discretionary relief on occupied property and mandatory zero rating for unoccupied property. The relevant legislation is the Local Government Finance Act 1988. The reliefs are not straightforward, and, in particular, the granting of the discretionary relief (which is by the local authority, or "billing authority") may vary from place to place.

In brief, the reliefs are a mandatory 80% relief on occupied properties, for which the charity must actively apply. An additional discretionary relief, of up to 20%, can also be applied for. The zero rating relief for unoccupied properties will apply where a property is unoccupied but will, when next occupied, be used wholly or mainly for charitable purposes (or those of a community amateur sports club).

Being a registered charity is conclusive proof of charitable status, but is not the only method to establish it. Simply being owned by a charity will not, however, be sufficient to qualify for the reliefs. The property must also be used wholly or mainly for charitable purposes, and the criteria set out in the Local Government Finance Act 1988 must also be met. The criteria for eligibility are not straightforward and there is some case law, especially in relation to charity shops, which provides guidance.

Charities and amateur sports clubs may also apply for a similar, but discretionary, relief. Charities are only eligible if they use the property for charitable purposes, while sports clubs must be registered as such with HMRC.

==== Empty and partly occupied relief ====
As of 1 April 2008, empty relief was altered, removing the previous total relief for industrial properties, and removing the 50% relief for other properties. The three-month period of total relief for non-industrial properties was retained, and a six-month period instituted for industrial properties. As before, some properties retained 100% empty relief; these included all properties below a certain rateable value (£2,200 from 2005), and listed buildings. In the Pre-Budget Report 2008, the Chancellor increased the rateable value for full relief to £15,000 for the period 1 April 2009 to 31 March 2010.

Where part of a property is to be empty for a short time, a discretionary form of empty relief exists for that empty part. The local authority can request an apportionment of the rateable value between empty and occupied parts from the Valuation Office Agency; the empty part can then receive relief in the normal way. This apportionment does not affect the rating list entry.

==== Rural property relief ====
To give relief to properties considered vital to rural communities, a combination of compulsory and discretionary reliefs exist in England. The Welsh scheme was incorporated into small business rates relief from 1 April 2007.

Properties of a given rateable value (£7,000 in England from 2005) can receive the relief if they are in a rural settlement (defined as a population of 3,000 or less, within designated rural areas), and are the only general store or post office, or food store in the settlement. The only public house or petrol station (with rateable values of up £10,500, as of 2005) in a settlement may also receive the relief, which is a mandatory 50%.

Discretionary relief of up to 100% is available for the previous properties, and for any others up to a current limit of £12000 rateable value, provided they are judged to be of benefit to the local community.

==== Small Business Rate Relief ====
Officially known as "Non-Domestic Rating (Small Business Rate Relief and Demand Notices)", the latest order came into force on 1 April 2026, under powers from the Local Government Finance Act 1988.

In England, the rating list that came into force on 1 April 2005 featured a new relief designed to benefit small businesses. The Local Government Act 2003 introduced a small business relief, initially set at 50% for properties with a rateable value of below £6,000, which is reduced by 1% for each £120 over £6,000 (effectively a sliding scale from 50% at £6,000 to 0% at £12,000), where the ratepayer has:

- one property, or
- one property plus additional properties, none of which may have a rateable value of more than £2,200, and the total rateable value of all properties is £15,000 (£21,500 in London).

Where there are additional properties, only the main property will have the relief applied. The relief must be actively applied for by completion of a form available from each local council. A bill to make the application of the relief mandatory was not passed into legislation although it would have led to a greater take-up of this assistance.

To fund the relief in England, a supplement is added to the Uniform Business Rate multiplier. However, this supplement is only applied to properties with rateable values of £15,000 or higher (£21,500 in London), so properties between £12,000 and £18,000 receive neither the relief, nor the supplement

In Wales, small business rates relief was not introduced until 2007. It replaced rural property relief, but included similar provisions, with 50% relief for most properties with a rateable value below £2,000, and 25% relief for rateable values between £2,000 and £5,000. Post offices with rateable values of up to £9,000 are eligible for 100% relief; while those over £9,000 and up to £12,000 receive 50%. It also authorises local authorities to set up local schemes of relief for properties up to a limit of £12,000 rateable value.

==== Transitional relief ====
On revaluation, the multiplier is adjusted so that the overall increase in liability across the country is in line with the Retail Prices Index, a measure of inflation. A property whose rateable value changes exactly in line with the national average would see an inflation-only rise in liability. Conversely, properties with unusually large changes in rateable value would have a significant change in liability. To smooth these jumps in liability, schemes of transitional relief have been applied to each rating list. These operate by restricting the proportion by which liability may change per year, both upwards and downwards. The 1990 and 1995 transitional relief schemes required funding from the Treasury, while the 2000 list scheme was designed to be revenue-neutral over the lifetime of the list, albeit with Treasury funding at the beginning. The Local Government Act 2003 required that all revaluations in England feature a revenue-neutral scheme, beginning with the 2005 rating list. Transitional relief applied only to changes in liability between rating lists, not changes within lists. For example, under the 2005 transitional relief scheme in England, if a rateable value had risen by 20%, the rise in liability would be restricted to 12.5% in the first year, 17.5% in the second year, and the full 20% in the third year (different restrictions would apply for a small business). Transitional relief schemes have been applied to the 1990, 1995, and 2000 rating lists in England and Wales, and to the 2005 rating list in England.

== Rating list ==
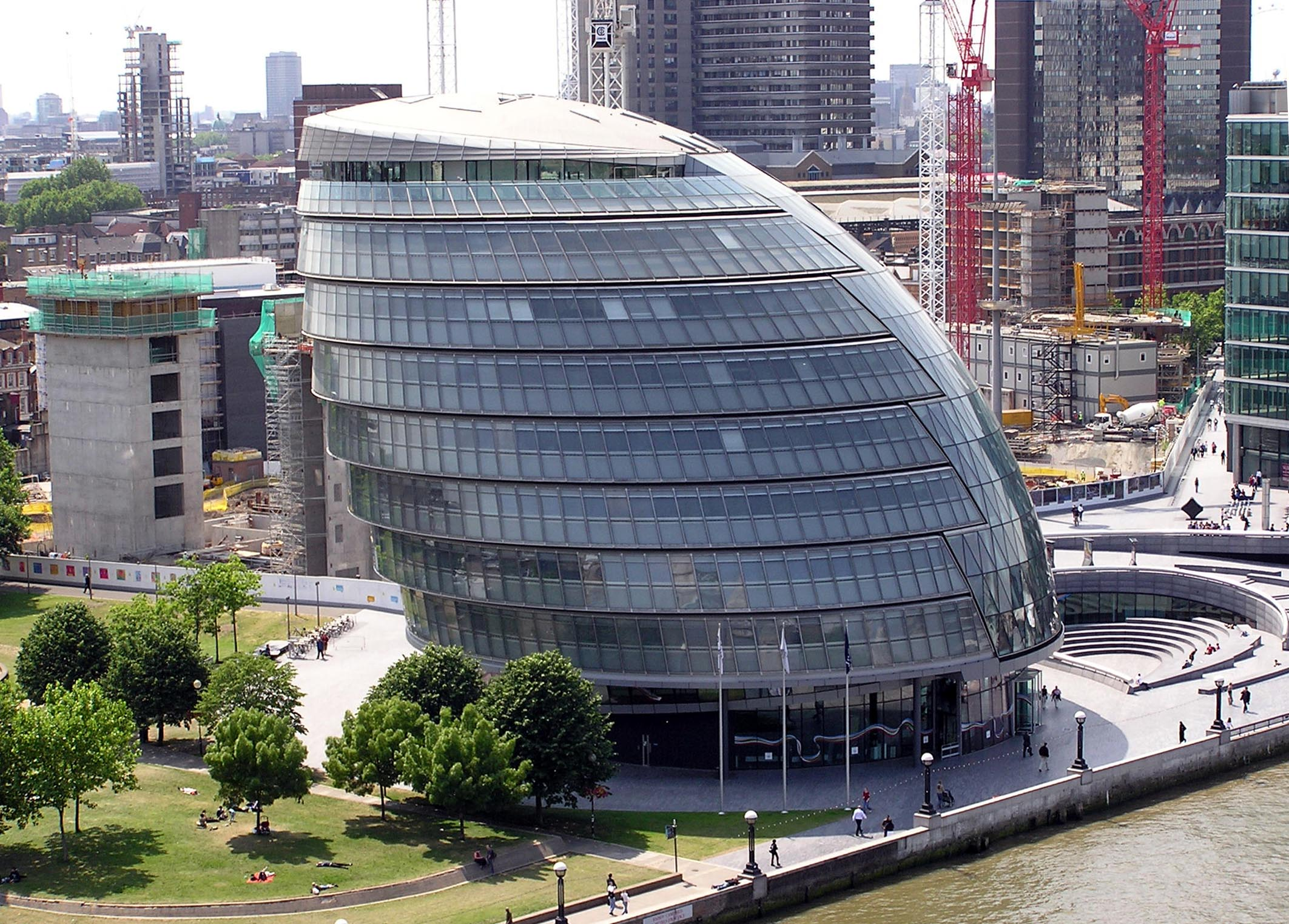
City Hall, London. Entered in the 2005 rating list on 1 April 2005 as 110, The Queens Walk, London, SE1 2AA; offices and premises, rateable value £3,740,000.

Starting on 1 April 1990, a rating list for each local authority was compiled. Although there is technically a separate list for each authority, it is common to refer to the aggregate of the lists as, for example, the 1990 Rating List. Rating lists are maintained during their lifetime to reflect changes in properties; new lists were formerly compiled every five years, although the Non-Domestic Rating Act 2023 subsequently shortened this period to three years, beginning in 2023. As well as local lists, there are a small number of central rating lists, used to assess properties that would otherwise span multiple lists, such as railway or telephone networks. A rating list is required to identify each relevant non-domestic property in the area, and assign a rateable value, based on a rental valuation of the property. Some types of property, such as public utilities, are valued using a statutory formula instead. The task of compiling and maintaining the list is given to the valuation officer for each authority, who is a civil servant of the Valuation Office Agency, an Executive Agency of HM Revenue & Customs.

== Rateable value ==
Rateable value is an estimate of the annual rent that would be paid for the property at a fixed date. Currently, this date is two years prior to the beginning of the list (known as the antecedent valuation date), incorporating certain assumptions laid down in the legislation. To value a property, a valuer would look at the physical properties of the property (such as size and location), and consider the economic conditions (the market price for similar local properties), along with the nature of the transaction (such as a freehold sale, or agreement of a lease).

Assessing a rateable value requires a valuation that follows the above process, but the matters to be considered are constrained by legislation. So the physical properties are considered not at the present day, but at the Material Day, and are constrained by the valuation assumptions. The economic conditions are considered at the Antecedent Valuation Date. The valuation is based on a hypothetical lease laid down in the valuation assumptions. The Secretary of State may make regulations for certain classes of property that give a statutory formula for the rateable value, instead of the rental value. These classes include large ports and public utilities.

=== Valuation assumptions ===
The valuation assumes that a year-to-year (that is, ongoing) lease is being agreed, where the tenant pays all repairs and insurance, and that the property "is in a state of reasonable repair". It appears that it was the intention of the drafters of the Local Government Finance Act 1988 that the previous assumption of 'reasonable repair' would continue in the new system. However, a successful legal challenge at the Lands Tribunal (Benjamin (VO) v Anston Properties Ltd [1998]) showed that they had in fact failed to include it in the legislation. This was rectified by the Rating (Valuation) Act 1999, which amended the 1988 Act to explicitly include the assumption. The repair assumption includes the proviso of "excluding from this assumption any repairs which a reasonable landlord would consider uneconomic." The property is assumed to be vacant and to let.

=== Material day and antecedent valuation date ===
The material day is the day on which matters affecting the physical state of the property are taken into account. The matters are those affecting the physical state or physical enjoyment, and the mode or category of occupation of the property. This can include the physical state of the locality, or matters which have a physical manifestation in the locality, and the use of other properties in the locality. For certain properties, including mines, quarries and landfill sites, the quantity of minerals, wastes, or other substances deposited on or remaining in the land are taken into account.

When the list is compiled, the material day is the day the list is compiled (1 April 2005 for the 2005 valuation list). If the list is further altered, the material day may be different for that alteration. For example, in the 2005 rating list the material day for an alteration to reflect an extension to a property will be the day the extension is completed. Previously the material day for an extension had been the day on which the list was altered. There are a number of different categories of events which cause the list to be altered (such as a new entry to the list, or the merger of properties), each of which has a specified material day. Most commonly the material day is the day the event occurred.

The antecedent valuation date is the day from which all other matters (effectively those to do with economic conditions) are determined. In the legislation it may be either the day of compilation, or a prior date set by the government. In practice, it has always been set at two years prior to the start of the list, so that for the 2005 rating list it is 1 April 2003.

== Hereditament ==
Hereditament is a legal term for a unit of property, which often appears to be synonymous with simply "property", in the bricks and mortar sense of the word. The concept of hereditament in rating law has developed along with that of rateable occupation through case law, as no single statute has defined it adequately. The Local Government Finance Act 1988 specifically retained the definition of hereditament from the General Rate Act 1967:

"hereditament" means property which is or may become liable to a rate, being a unit of such property which is, or would fall to be, shown as a separate item in the valuation list.

This itself does not directly provide a definition, but depends on the case law already established by prior forms of rating; no statutory definition of the hereditament exists. In case law, the concept of the hereditament is inextricably linked to that of rateable occupation.

=== Rateable occupation ===
Rateable occupation is occupying a hereditament so as to be liable to pay a rate. In the case of LCC v Wilkins (VO) [1957], the court brought together various prior cases to establish four essentials for rateable occupation:

- Actual occupation — requires physical occupation of the property, in the sense that some use is made of it or control exercised over it. It is treated as a matter of fact, so the legal title may not always be relevant.
- Exclusive occupation – Also a matter of fact, although legal title will often play a part. The courts have laid down that where there are competing occupations, the facts must be considered to establish where paramount control lies. For example, in Westminster City Council v Southern Railway Co & Others [1936], the court had to consider the level of control exercised by operators of various stalls and shops on a railway station, compared to that of the railway company.
- Beneficial occupation – of some benefit to the occupier. It is not necessary to consider financial profit, as the test here is whether someone will pay rent for the property. For example, in R v School Board for London (1886), the board operating a school could take no profit; the court held that this did not prevent beneficial occupation.
- Not too transient – the occupation must not be for too short and fleeting a time. The courts have held back from giving a precise length of time, preferring to judge cases on their facts, including the intentions of the parties involved.

The relationship between rateable occupation and the hereditament can be a complex one – taking rateable occupation of part of a hereditament creates a new hereditament out of the larger one, for example. In practice, determination of rateable occupation and hereditament is often interlinked.

=== Concept of hereditament ===
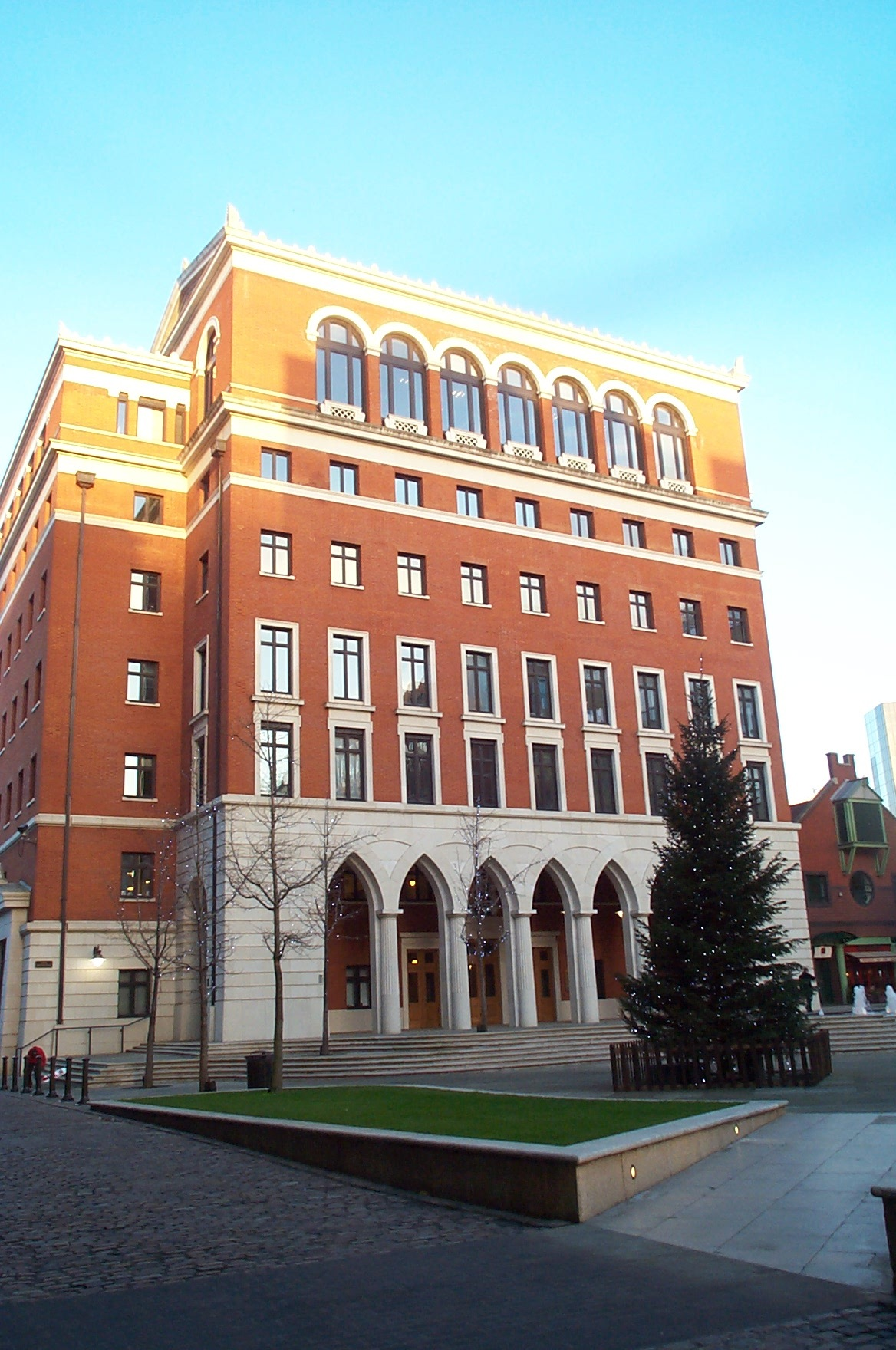
Three Brindleyplace, an office block in Birmingham. Although a single building, it has multiple occupiers. It therefore contains multiple hereditaments, each with a separate entry in the 2005 rating list.

In the leading case of Gilbert (Valuation Officer) v Hickinbottom & Sons Ltd [1956], Lord Denning said:

The case therefore raises the important question: What is a separate hereditament for rating purposes? The statutes contain no definition, but the practice, which has prevailed for many years past, warrants the following general rules

Where two or more properties are within the same curtilage or contiguous to one another, and are in the same occupation, they are as a general rule to be treated for rating purposes as if they formed parts of a single hereditament. There are exceptional cases, however, where for some special reason they may be treated as two or more hereditaments.

Where the two properties are in the same occupation but are not within the same curtilage nor contiguous to one another, each of them must as a general rule be treated as a separate hereditament for rating purposes: and this is the case even though they are used by the occupier for the purposes of his one whole business.

The principle Denning stated shows that if a business occupies a single property, that is the hereditament. If it occupies only the ground floor, that is the hereditament (and the first floor is a separate hereditament). If it occupies the neighbouring property as well, the two together are the hereditament.

Gilbert v Hickinbottom featured an exception to the general rule, where there were two properties in the same occupation, separated by a public highway. It was held that the functional connection between the two properties was so great that they were to be treated as a single hereditament. Functional connection is judged by the strength of the connection and the degree and nature of the separation. In Edwards (VO) v. BP Refinery [1974], the analogy of a spark plug was used to illustrate the principle.

A hereditament can include the right to exhibit advertisements on another's property (such as a commercial advertising hoarding), mines, and certain sporting rights. Some items of plant and machinery within a hereditament are assumed to be included in the hereditament.

=== Exemption ===
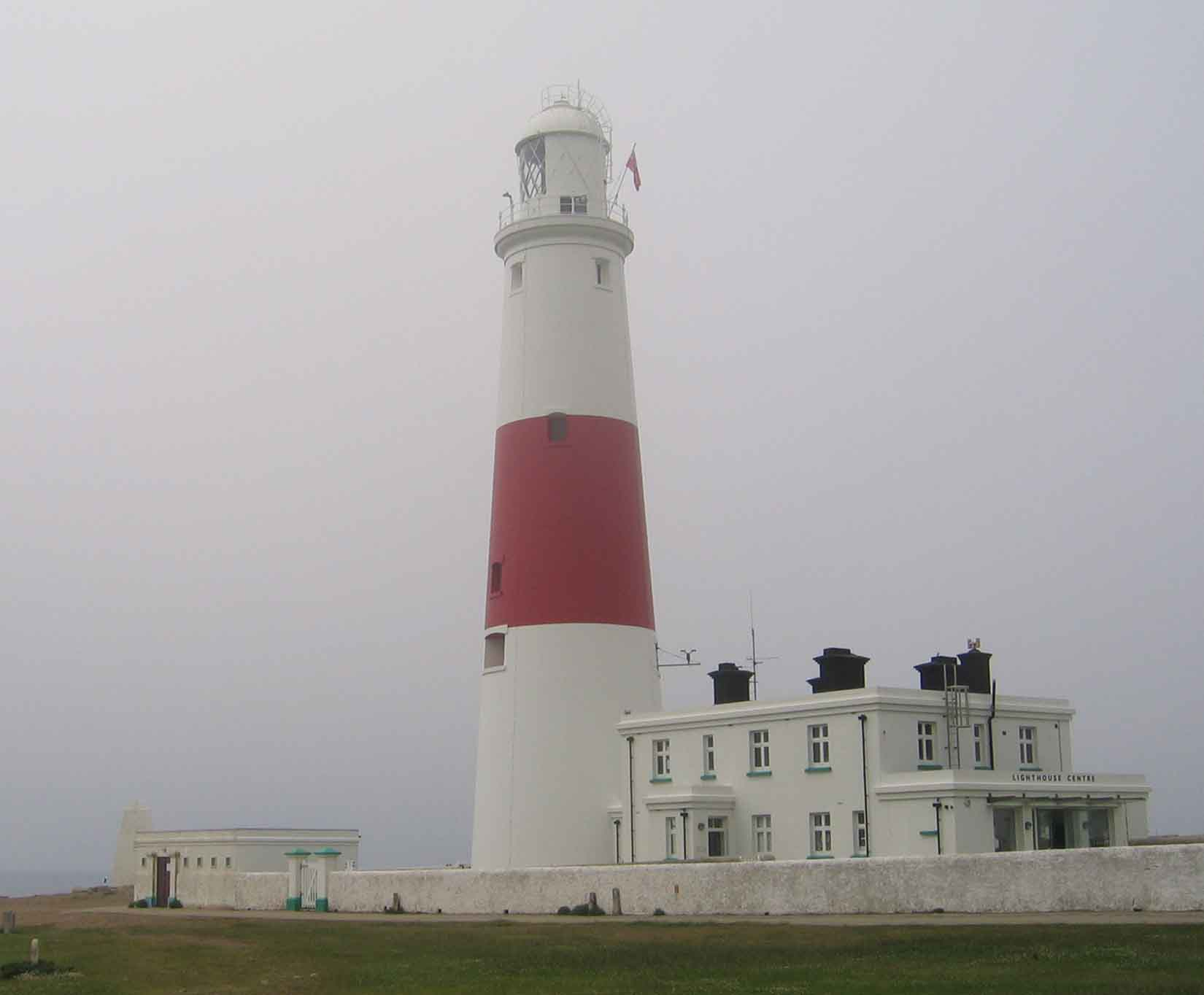
Portland Bill Lighthouse, owned by Trinity House and therefore exempt from non-domestic rates

Certain properties which would otherwise be rateable are in fact exempt from rating (that is, are not entered in any rating list). These properties are specified by the Local Government Finance Act 1988, and include the following:

- Agricultural land and buildings
- Fish farms
- Places of public religious worship
- Lighthouses, buoys and beacons occupied by or belonging to Trinity House
- Sewers and accessories belonging to a sewer
- Certain property of drainage authorities
- Parks
- Property used for the disabled
- Air raid protection works, provided the hereditament is not used or occupied for any other purpose
- Swinging moorings
- Roads crossing over or under watercourses
- Hereditaments in enterprise zones
- Visiting forces premises

It is possible for only part of a property to be exempt, and the rest of it rated accordingly.

=== Domestic and non-domestic ===
Domestic property is defined in the Local Government Finance Act 1988 as "used wholly for the purposes of living accommodation", with provisos to exclude hotels and short stay accommodation and include moorings and caravans where appropriate. It states that unused domestic property is to be considered domestic if it appears that will be the next use. Any hereditament that does not meet the criteria for domestic will be non-domestic (although it may then be exempt). It is possible for a hereditament to be both non-domestic and domestic in different parts, for example a shop with living accommodation. This is known as a composite hereditament, and the whole property is entered in the rating list, but the non-domestic valuation is based on the non-domestic part only.

== Alterations and proposals ==
Each rating list runs for three years, and may change within that time. The value from the very start of the list can be altered, or events within the life of the list (such as an extension) can be reflected by changes within the list, leading to different values at different times. For example, a property is entered in a rating list at 1 April 2005 with a rateable value of £10,000, and a year later the property is extended causing an increase to £12,000 from 1 April 2006; the original entry of £10,000 remains unchanged for the first year. A successful proposal could alter this original value of £10,000 to £9,000 from 1 April 2005 to 31 March 2006, but the second entry from 1 April 2006 would remain unchanged at £12,000.

The Local Government Finance Act 1988 gives broad authorisation for regulations to be made about alterations, which can include alterations by the Valuation Office Agency to maintain the list accurately, or proposals by interested parties to change the list. The regulations have differed widely, changing the time-frame of when alterations are effective. For example, proposals to alter the 2000 rating list by an occupier were restricted to take effect in the financial year in which they were made, but the 2005 rating list removed this restriction, so that a successful proposal can have effect as far back as 1 April 2005.

What is commonly known as an appeal is more correctly known as a proposal to alter the rating list. Proposals can be made on a number of grounds, including challenging the basic rateable value, an alteration to the property, or proposing a reduction from a specific date due to a particular event (such as changes to a street affecting traffic). When an appeal is made, it will first be discussed with the Valuation Office Agency, who will attempt to come to an agreement. If no agreement is reached, and the proposal is not withdrawn, it will be heard by an independent valuation tribunal.

== See also ==
- Taxation in the United Kingdom
- Rates (tax)
- Local government in the United Kingdom § Funding
