= Rating (Empty Properties) Act 2007 =

Act of the Parliament of the United Kingdom

Rating (Empty Properties) Act 2007 (Note: Section 3(1).)
- Act of Parliament
- Parliament of the United Kingdom
- Long title: An Act to make provision for and in connection with the liability of owners of unoccupied hereditaments to a non-domestic rate.
- Citation: 2007 c. 9
- Introduced by: Ruth Kelly (Commons); Lord Davies of Oldham (Lords)
- Territorial extent: England and Wales (Note: Section 3(6).)

Dates
- Royal assent: 19 July 2007
- Commencement: 19 July 2007 (Note: Section 3(2).)
- Repealed: 1 April 2024
Other legislation
Amends	National Heritage Act 1980; Local Government Finance Act 1988
Repealed by	Non-Domestic Rating Act 2023

Status: Repealed

History of passage through Parliament

Text of statute as originally enacted

Revised text of statute as amended

The Rating (Empty Properties) Act 2007 (c. 9) was an act of the Parliament of the United Kingdom.

== Background ==
Before the act, empty industrial and warehouse premises paid no business rates, and all other empty commercial premises (including offices and retail) paid business rates with a 50% discount after receiving an initial 100% exemption for the first three months.

== Provisions ==
It implements recommendations of the Barker Review of Land Use Planning and the Lyons Inquiry into Local Government, and proposals in the report Budget 2007: Building Britain's long-term future: Prosperity and fairness for families.

The act includes exemptions for charities and community amateur sports clubs.

=== Section 1 - Unoccupied hereditaments: chargeable amount ===
Section 1(1) substitutes new sections 45(4) to 45(4B) for the existing section 45(4) of the Local Government Finance Act 1988. Section 1(2) inserts section 45A of that Act. Section 1(3) inserts section 143(3B) of that Act.

== Reception ==
The Confederation of British Industry Wales criticised the Welsh Government's decision to pass a legislative consent motion in favour of the legislation.
