= Anti-Poll Tax Unions =

Anti-Poll Tax Unions (APTUs) were set up in local areas throughout Scotland, England and Wales to organise against the poll tax (officially the "Community Charge") brought in by Margaret Thatcher's Conservative government in 1989 (Scotland) and 1990 (England and Wales).

The first anti-poll tax union was established in Maryhill, Glasgow, April 1987.

An All Britain Anti-Poll Tax Federation ("the Fed") was set up to co-ordinate the activities of the local unions.

The Anti-Poll Tax Unions played a major part in the legal actions in which around 20 million people were summoned for non-payment of the tax. Those jailed included Terry Fields, MP for Liverpool Broadgreen.
