= National Gallery and Tate Gallery Act 1954 =

Act of the Parliament of the United Kingdom

National Gallery and Tate Gallery Act 1954 (Note: Section 8(1).)
- Act of Parliament
- Parliament of the United Kingdom
- Long title: An Act to amend the law relating to the National Gallery and the Tate Gallery and for purposes connected therewith.
- Citation: 2 & 3 Eliz. 2. c. 65
- Introduced by: Henry Brooke MP, Financial Secretary to the Treasury (Commons); Earl of Selkirk (Lords)
- Territorial extent: United Kingdom

Dates
- Royal assent: 25 November 1954
- Commencement: 14 February 1955 (Note: Section 8(3).)
- Repealed: 1 September 1992 (Note: The Museums and Galleries Act 1992 (Commencement) Order 1992.)
Other legislation
Amends	National Gallery (Loan) Act 1883; National Gallery Act 1856; Imperial War Museum Act 1920; National Gallery (Overseas Loans) Act 1935; Statute Law (Repeals) Act 1974
Amended by	National Heritage (Scotland) Act 1985; Museum of London Act 1965; Transfer of Functions (Cultural Institutions) Order 1965; Statute Law (Repeals) Act 1974; Transfer of Functions (Arts and Libraries) Order 1979; Transfer of Functions (Arts, Libraries and National Heritage) Order 1981; National Heritage Act 1983; Transfer of Functions (Arts, Libraries and National Heritage) Order 1983; Transfer of Functions (Arts, Libraries and National Heritage) Order 1984; National Heritage (Scotland) Act 1985; Transfer of Functions (Arts, Libraries and National Heritage) Order 1986; Transfer of Functions (National Heritage) Order 1992
Repealed by	Museums and Galleries Act 1992
Relates to	National Gallery Act 1856

Status: Repealed

Text of statute as originally enacted

Revised text of statute as amended

The National Gallery and Tate Gallery Act 1954 (2 & 3 Eliz. 2. c. 65) was an act of the Parliament of the United Kingdom. The act came into force in 1955.

== Provisions ==
It created a legal separation between the National Gallery and the Tate and established the Tate as an independent institution. The act gave the National Gallery and the Tate wide powers to loan to public institutions and to transfer to other national museums in the United Kingdom, but no powers of sale.

== Subsequent developments ==
Sections 3(2), 6 and 8(2) of, and schedule 2 to, the act were repealed by section 1 of, and part XI of the schedule to, the Statute Law (Repeals) Act 1974, which came into force on 27 June 1974.

The whole act was repealed by the Museums and Galleries Act 1992, which came into force on 1 September 1992. The act created a board of trustees to operate the Tate.
