= Trafalgar Square Defendants Campaign =

The Trafalgar Square Defendants Campaign was an organisation set up to provide practical support for the hundreds of people who were arrested during and after the 1990 poll tax riots and in particular, to push for the release of all prisoners and the dropping of all charges. Their case was strengthened when Channel 4 broadcast footage showing the police attacking marchers prior to the riot breaking out.

As with many campaigns against government policy, it was supported by the Socialist Workers Party. This, in turn, led to it being spied on by the Special Demonstration Squad of the Metropolitan Police whose surveillance reports were supplied to MI5.
