= Rates Act 1984 =

Act of the Parliament of the United Kingdom

Rates Act 1984 (Note: Section 19(1).)
- Act of Parliament
- Parliament of the United Kingdom
- Long title: An Act to enable the Secretary of State to limit the rates made and precepts issued by local authorities; to require local authorities to consult representatives of industrial and commercial ratepayers before reaching decisions on expenditure and the means of financing it; to make provision for requiring additional information to be given to ratepayers; to require notice of the rates payable in respect of a dwelling-house to be given to any occupier not in receipt of a demand note; and to make other amendments relating to rates.
- Citation: 1984 c. 33
- Territorial extent: England and Wales (Note: Section 19(3).)

Dates
- Royal assent: 26 June 1984
- Commencement: various (Note: Section 18.)
- Repealed: 21 July 2008
Other legislation
Amends	General Rate Act 1967; Local Government Act 1972; Rating (Disabled Persons) Act 1978; Local Government, Planning and Land Act 1980; Local Government Finance Act 1982
Amended by	Local Government Act 1985; Local Government Finance Act 1987; Rate Limitation (Designation of Authorities) (Exemption) Order 1988; Local Government Finance (Repeals, Savings and Consequential Amendments) Order 1990; Charities Act 1993; Greater London Authority Act 1999; Charities Act 2006; Local Transport Act 2008
Repealed by	Statute Law (Repeals) Act 2008

Status: Repealed

Text of statute as originally enacted

Revised text of statute as amended

The Rates Act 1984 (c. 33) was an act of the Parliament of the United Kingdom, which controls the tax-raising powers of local authorities.

== Background ==
The Thatcher government had been at odds with several high spending Labour controlled councils. The Local Government Finance and Planning Act 1980 and the Local Government Finance Act 1982 allowed central government to decide spending limits for individual authorities. It could remove general grants, which accounted for approximately 60% of the councils’ income, if they continued to overspend. Several councils continued with their programmes of services and had their general grant cut under the earlier legislation. For example, by 1983, the Greater London Council (GLC) had lost all its central funding.

However, the GLC and other councils sought to recoup the loss by increasing the amount they levied in domestic and business rates; a tax paid by companies and homeowners.

== Provisions ==
The act allowed the government to individually set caps for the increases to rates that each authority could levy. Those who acted ultra vires (or "beyond the powers") set out in the Act could be prosecuted, banned from office for up to ten years and fined. The power to control rates came into force for the year beginning 1 April 1985.

== Use ==
The act was successfully used to force 31 councils (30 were Labour controlled), who had initially resisted, to comply with government taxation and spending limits. Of those, only Lambeth and Liverpool councillors did not back down and eventually the Act was used to prosecute and fine the leader of Lambeth Council, Ted Knight, and others. He was banned from office for ten years.

== Subsequent developments ==
The domestic rates were replaced in 1990 by the Community Charge (dubbed poll tax), which was paid by more people and intended to reveal inefficient councils, who would be forced to levy a higher charge in order to fund their overspending. Business rates are still levied, but at a level set by central government since 1990.

The whole act was repealed by section 1(1) of, and part 7 of schedule 1 to, the Statute Law (Repeals) Act 2008, which came into force on 21 July 2008.
