= Local Government Finance Act 1988 =

Act of the Parliament of the United Kingdom

Local Government Finance Act 1988 (Note: Section 152.)
- Act of Parliament
- Parliament of the United Kingdom
- Long title: An Act to create community charges in favour of certain authorities, to create new rating systems, to provide for precepting by certain authorities and levying by certain bodies, to make provision about the payment of grants to certain authorities, to require certain authorities to maintain certain funds, to make provision about the capital expenditure and the administration of the financial affairs of certain authorities, to abolish existing rates, precepts and similar rights, to abolish rate support grants and supplementary grants for transport purposes, to make amendments as to rates and certain grants, to make certain amendments to the law of Scotland as regards community charges, rating and valuation, to provide for the establishment of valuation and community charge tribunals, and for connected purposes.
- Citation: 1988 c. 41
- Territorial extent: England and Wales; Scotland; (Note: Section 151.)

Dates
- Royal assent: 29 July 1988
- Commencement: 1 April 1989 (Note: Section 150.)

Other legislation
- Amends: London Government Act 1963; International Organisations Act 1968; Water (Scotland) Act 1980
- Amended by: Social Security (Consequential Provisions) Act 1992; Local Government Finance Act 1992; Tribunals and Inquiries Act 1992; Police Act 1996; Planning (Consequential Provisions) (Scotland) Act 1997; Justices of the Peace Act 1997; Audit Commission Act 1998; Postal Services Act 2000; Statute Law (Repeals) Act 2004; Government of Wales Act 2006; National Health Service (Consequential Provisions) Act 2006; Rating (Empty Properties) Act 2007; Postal Services Act 2011; Cities and Local Government Devolution Act 2016; Sentencing Act 2020; Non-Domestic Rating Act 2023

Status: Amended

Text of statute as originally enacted

Revised text of statute as amended

Text of the Local Government Finance Act 1988 as in force today (including any amendments) within the United Kingdom, from legislation.gov.uk.

The Local Government Finance Act 1988 (c. 41) is an act of the Parliament of the United Kingdom that made significant reforms to local taxation in the United Kingdom (except Northern Ireland). The old systems of rates were replaced by the Community Charge (for individuals) and business rates (for businesses). The Community Charge was extremely unpopular, leading to the poll tax riots of 1990, and contributing to the resignation of Margaret Thatcher as Prime Minister later that year.

The sections of the Act pertaining to the Community Charge were repealed by the Local Government Finance Act 1992, which introduced the new Council Tax as a replacement from 1993.

== Section 114 ==
A section 114 notice is a report issued by the chief financial officer (or Section 151 officer) of a British public body to prevent certain types of expenditure. It takes its name from section 114 of the Local Government Finance Act 1988 (c. 41).

The most common type of notice is made under section 114(3) which restricts all spending except for that which funds statutory services. Despite the fact that local authorities in the United Kingdom cannot go bankrupt, issuing a section 114 notice is often described in the media as a council effectively declaring bankruptcy. Most councils under a section 114 notice will then pass a new budget to introduce cuts and reduce spending.

Amongst other instances, section 114 notices have been issued by Hackney Council in 2000, Northamptonshire Council twice in 2018, Croydon Council in 2020 and 2022, Slough Council in 2021, Thurrock Council in 2022, and Woking Borough Council and Birmingham City Council in 2023.
