= National Gallery Act 1856 =

Act of the Parliament of the United Kingdom

National Gallery Act 1856 (Note: The citation of this act by this short title was authorised by section 1 of, and the first schedule to, the Short Titles Act 1896. Due to the repeal of those provisions it is now authorised by section 19(2) of the Interpretation Act 1978.)
- Act of Parliament
- Parliament of the United Kingdom
- Long title: An Act to extend the Powers of the Trustees and Director of the National Gallery, and to authorize the Sale of Works of Art belonging to the Public.
- Citation: 19 & 20 Vict. c. 29
- Territorial extent: United Kingdom

Dates
- Royal assent: 23 June 1856
- Commencement: 23 June 1856 (Note: The Acts of Parliament (Commencement) Act 1793.)
- Repealed: 1 September 1992 (Note: The Museums and Galleries Act 1992 (Commencement) Order 1992 (SI 1992/1874).)
Other legislation
Amended by	National Gallery and Tate Gallery Act 1954
Repealed by	Museums and Galleries Act 1992
Relates to	National Gallery and Tate Gallery Act 1954

Status: Repealed

Text of statute as originally enacted

Revised text of statute as amended

The National Gallery Act 1856 (19 & 20 Vict. c. 29) was an act of the Parliament of the United Kingdom related to the National Gallery and Tate gallery in London, England, with respect to the sale of works of art by the trustees.

== Subsequent developments ==
The whole act was repealed by section 11(3) of, and schedule 9 to, the Museums and Galleries Act 1992, which came into force on 1 September 1992.
