= Museums and Galleries Act 1992 =

Act of the Parliament of the United Kingdom

Museums and Galleries Act 1992 (Note: Section 11(1).)
- Act of Parliament
- Parliament of the United Kingdom
- Long title: An Act to establish Boards of Trustees of the National Gallery, the Tate Gallery, the National Portrait Gallery and the Wallace Collection; to transfer property to them and confer functions on them; to make new provision as to transfers to and between the collections of certain museums, galleries and libraries; to make provision for and in connection with the vesting of land in the governing bodies of such institutions; to make provision for the financing of such institutions and of the Museums and Galleries Commission; to make further provision with respect to the giving of indemnities against the loss of, or damage to, objects on loan to certain institutions; to change the name of, and to make further provision with respect to, the British Museum (Natural History); and to amend certain enactments relating to museums, galleries and libraries; and for purposes connected herewith.
- Citation: 1992 c. 44
- Territorial extent: England and Wales; Scotland (in part); Northern Ireland (in part); (Note: Section 11(5)–(6).)

Dates
- Royal assent: 16 March 1992
- Commencement: 1 September 1992 (except section 9); 1 April 1993 (section 9); (Note: Section 11(4). The Museums and Galleries Act 1992 (Commencement) Order 1992.)

Other legislation
- Amends: British Museum (Purchase of Land) Act 1894; National Galleries of Scotland Act 1906; Imperial War Museum Act 1920; National Maritime Museum Act 1934; Imperial War Museum Act 1955; Charities Act 1960; British Museum Act 1963; Museum of London Act 1965; Superannuation Act 1965; Superannuation Act 1972; British Library Act 1972; Museums and Galleries Admission Charges Act 1972; Capital Gains Tax Act 1979; National Heritage Act 1980; National Heritage Act 1983; National Heritage (Scotland) Act 1985; Income and Corporation Taxes Act 1988; Taxation of Chargeable Gains Act 1992; Charities Act 1992
- Repeals/revokes: National Gallery Act 1856; National Gallery and Tate Gallery Act 1954
- Amended by: Transfer of Functions (National Heritage) Order 1992; Charities Act 1993; Statute Law (Repeals) Act 1993; Employment Rights Act 1996; Museums and Galleries Act 1992 (Amendment) Order 1998; Scotland Act 1998 (Modification of Functions) Order 1999; Museums and Galleries Act 1992 (Amendment) Order 2000; Stamp Duty Land Tax (Consequential Amendment of Enactments) Regulations 2003; Tate Gallery Board (Additional Members) Order 2008; Corporation Tax Act 2010; National Library of Scotland Act 2012

Status: Amended

Text of statute as originally enacted

Revised text of statute as amended

Text of the Museums and Galleries Act 1992 as in force today (including any amendments) within the United Kingdom, from legislation.gov.uk.

The Museums and Galleries Act 1992 (c. 44) is an act of the Parliament of the United Kingdom.

== Provisions ==
This act legislates the operation and financing of the museums mentioned in its title. For example, it establishes that the National Portrait Gallery is to "maintain a collection of portraits in all media of the most eminent persons in British history from the earliest times to the present day".

The act provides the prime minister's power to appoint the members of the Boards of Trustees of the National Gallery (except one member), the Tate Gallery (except one member), the National Portrait Gallery, and the Wallace Collection.

The act repealed the National Gallery and Tate Gallery Act 1954 (2 & 3 Eliz. 2. c. 65).

According to the National Gallery, the act prevents it from disposing of items, unless it is to other recognised national bodies.
