= Place shaping =

Place shaping is a term coined by Michael Lyons in the Lyons Inquiry (2004-7) into the form, function and funding of local government in England. Lyons suggested that local government should act as the voice of a whole community and as "an agent of place".
