= National Heritage Act =

Stock short title used for legislation

National Heritage Act is a stock short title used in Malaysia and the United Kingdom for legislation relating to national heritage.

== List ==
=== Malaysia ===
- The National Heritage Act 2005

=== United Kingdom ===
The National Heritage Acts comprise five acts of the Parliament of the United Kingdom that aimed to alter the way in which Britain's national heritage assets are managed and protected.

==== National Heritage Act 1980 ====
National Heritage Act 1980 (Note: Section 18(1).)
- Act of Parliament
- Parliament of the United Kingdom
- Long title: An Act to establish a National Heritage Memorial Fund for providing financial assistance for the acquisition, maintenance and preservation of land, buildings and objects of outstanding historic and other interest; to make new provision in relation to the arrangements for accepting property in satisfaction of capital transfer tax and estate duty; to provide for payments out of public funds in respect of the loss of or damage to objects loaned to or displayed in local museums and other institutions; and for purposes connected with those matters.
- Citation: 1980 c. 17
- Territorial extent: United Kingdom (Note: Section 18(6).)

Dates
- Royal assent: 31 March 1980
- Commencement: 31 March 1980 (Note: Section 4(b) of the Interpretation Act 1978.)
Other legislation
Amends	Finance Act 1946; Finance Act 1953; Historic Buildings and Ancient Monuments Act 1953; Redundant Churches and other Religious Buildings Act 1969; Finance Act 1975
Amended by	Transfer of Functions (Arts, Libraries and National Heritage) Order 1981; Transfer of Functions (Arts, Libraries and National Heritage) Order 1983; Inheritance Tax Act 1984; Local Government Finance (Repeals, Savings and Consequential Amendments) Order 1990; Museums and Galleries Act 1992; Transfer of Functions (National Heritage) Order 1992; National Lottery etc. Act 1993; National Heritage Act 1997; Scotland Act 1998 (Modification of Functions) Order 1999; Trustee Act 2000; Scotland Act 1998 (Cross-Border Public Authorities)(Adaptation of Functions etc.) Order 2000; Stamp Duty Land Tax (Consequential Amendment of Enactments) Regulations 2003; Statute Law (Repeals) Act 2004; Tribunals, Courts and Enforcement Act 2007 (Consequential Amendments) Order 2012; Rating (Empty Properties) Act 2007; Non-Domestic Rating Act 2023

Status: Amended

Text of statute as originally enacted

Revised text of statute as amended

The National Heritage Act 1980 (c. 17) established the National Heritage Memorial Fund, abolished the National Land Fund, made provision for property to be accepted in satisfaction of taxation and provided for indemnities for objects on loan from museums and libraries. One of the primary drivers for the Act was the public controversy relating to the refusal of the Callaghan government to accept an offer of Mentmore Towers and its contents in lieu of inheritance tax.

==== National Heritage Act 1983 ====
National Heritage Act 1983 (Note: Section 43.)
- Act of Parliament
- Parliament of the United Kingdom
- Long title: An Act to establish Boards of Trustees of the Victoria and Albert Museum, the Science Museum, the Armouries and the Royal Botanic Gardens, Kew, to transfer property to them and confer functions on them, to make provision in relation to government grants to, and employment by, armed forces museums, to establish a Historic Buildings and Monuments Commission for England, to confer functions on the Commission, to dissolve the Historic Buildings Council for England and the Ancient Monuments Board for England, to amend certain enactments relating to the heritage and for connected purposes.
- Citation: 1983 c. 47
- Territorial extent: England and Wales (Note: Section 42.)

Dates
- Royal assent: 13 May 1983
- Commencement: Various (Note: Section 41.)
Other legislation
Amends	Patents and Designs Act 1907; Historic Buildings and Ancient Monuments Act 1953; National Gallery and Tate Gallery Act 1954; Public Records Act 1958; Charities Act 1960; British Museum Act 1963; Pastoral Measure 1968; Redundant Churches and Other Religious Buildings Act 1969; Town and Country Planning Act 1971; British Library Act 1972; Town and Country Planning (Amendment) Act 1972; Ancient Monuments and Archaeological Areas Act 1979; Pastoral Measure 1983
Amended by	Housing and Planning Act 1986; Planning (Consequential Provisions) Act 1990; Planning and Compensation Act 1991; Companies Act 1989 (Eligibility for Appointment as Company Auditor) (Consequential Amendments) Regulations 1991; Charities Act 1992; Museums and Galleries Act 1992; Charities Act 1993; Leasehold Reform, Housing and Urban Development Act 1993; Statute Law (Repeals) Act 1993; Armed Forces Act 1996; Employment Rights Act 1996; Housing Act 1996; Planning (Consequential Provisions) (Scotland) Act 1997; Local Government and Rating Act 1997; Employment Rights (Dispute Resolution) Act 1998; National Heritage Act 2002; Ministry of Agriculture, Fisheries and Food (Dissolution) Order 2002; Government Resources and Accounts Act 2000 (Audit of Public Bodies) Order 2003; Statute Law (Repeals) Act 2004; Natural Environment and Rural Communities Act 2006; Companies Act 2006 (Consequential Amendments etc) Order 2008; Transfer of Tribunal Functions (Lands Tribunal and Miscellaneous Amendments) Order 2009; Public Bodies Act 2011; Tribunals, Courts and Enforcement Act 2007 (Consequential Amendments) Order 2012; Enterprise and Regulatory Reform Act 2013; Historic Environment (Wales) Act 2023
Relates to	Wellington Museum Act 1947

Status: Amended

Text of statute as originally enacted

Revised text of statute as amended

The National Heritage Act 1983 (c. 47) established the Victoria and Albert Museum, the Science Museum, the Armouries and the Royal Botanic Gardens, Kew as non-departmental public bodies to be governed by boards of trustees.

Section 30 of the act made provision for the designation and funding of the Armed Forces Museums.

Prior to 1982, other British ancient or historical monuments and buildings had been protected through the Department of the Environment. This was felt by the ruling Conservative government to be lacking in public respect and to be excessively expensive. The 1983 Act created the Historic Buildings and Monuments Commission (HBMC), another non-departmental public body, to be given the a broad remit of managing the historic built environment of England. After the passing of the act, the HBMC was given the shorter working name of English Heritage, by which it was commonly known until 2015. After 2015, the body was divided into two parts, with the Commission being renamed Historic England. English Heritage remained as a charitable organisation, looking after the National Heritage Collection including properties like Audley End and Kenwood House.

==== National Heritage (Scotland) Act 1985 ====
National Heritage (Scotland) Act 1985 (Note: Section 25(2).)
- Act of Parliament
- Parliament of the United Kingdom
- Long title: An Act to transfer responsibility for the Royal Scottish Museum and the National Museum of Antiquities of Scotland to a new Board of Trustees of the National Museums of Scotland, to establish a Board of Trustees of the Royal Botanic Garden, Edinburgh, to make provision as to the status, functions and powers of the new Boards, and as to the property to be held by them, to make further provision as to the Boards of Trustees of the National Galleries of Scotland and the National Library of Scotland, to confer on the Secretary of State power to make grants for cultural and scientific purposes, to amend the Public Records (Scotland) Act 1937 and the Historic Buildings and Ancient Monuments Act 1953 and for connected purposes.
- Citation: 1985 c. 16
- Territorial extent: Scotland (Note: Section 25(3).)

Dates
- Royal assent: 4 April 1985
- Commencement: 4 June 1985; 1 October 1985; 1 April 1986; (Note: Section 25(1). The National Heritage (Scotland) Act 1985 Commencement Order 1985.)
Other legislation
Amends	National Galleries of Scotland Act 1906; National Library of Scotland Act 1925; Public Records (Scotland) Act 1937; Historic Buildings and Ancient Monuments Act 1953; National Gallery and Tate Gallery Act 1954; Museums and Galleries Admission Charges Act 1972; Inheritance Tax Act 1984
Repeals/revokes	National Museum of Antiquities of Scotland Act 1954
Amended by	Museums and Galleries Act 1992; Requirements of Writing (Scotland) Act 1995; Employment Rights Act 1996; Local Government and Rating Act 1997; Employment Rights (Dispute Resolution) Act 1998; Scotland Act 1998 (Consequential Modifications) (No.2) Order 1999; Public Finance and Accountability (Scotland) Act 2000; Public Services Reform (Scotland) Act 2010; National Library of Scotland Act 2012

Status: Amended

Text of statute as originally enacted

Revised text of statute as amended

The National Heritage (Scotland) Act 1985 (c. 16) followed the National Galleries of Scotland Act 1906 and established boards of trustees responsible for the Royal Scottish Museum, The National Museum of Antiquities of Scotland and the Royal Botanic Garden, Edinburgh. It made more provision for the boards of trustees for National Galleries of Scotland and the National Library of Scotland.

==== National Heritage Act 1997 ====
National Heritage Act 1997 (Note: Section 4(1).)
- Act of Parliament
- Parliament of the United Kingdom
- Long title: An Act to extend the powers of the Trustees of the National Heritage Memorial Fund.
- Citation: 1997 c. 14
- Territorial extent: United Kingdom (Note: Section 4(3).)

Dates
- Royal assent: 27 February 1997
- Commencement: 4 March 1998 (Note: Section 4(2). The National Heritage Act 1997 (Commencement) Order 1998.)
Other legislation
Amends	National Heritage Act 1980; Planning (Northern Ireland) Order 1991; National Lottery etc. Act 1993; Historic Monuments and Archaeological Objects (Northern Ireland) Order 1995

Status: Current legislation

Text of statute as originally enacted

Revised text of statute as amended

The National Heritage Act 1997 (c. 14) amended the 1980 act by extending the scope of the National Heritage Memorial Fund to include

things of any kind which are of scenic, historic, archaeological, aesthetic, architectural, engineering, artistic or scientific interest, including animals and plants which are of zoological or botanical interest.

It also modified the 1983 act, inserting section 31A to make specific provision for preservation of the Royal Naval College site.

==== National Heritage Act 2002 ====
National Heritage Act 2002 (Note: Section 8(1).)
- Act of Parliament
- Parliament of the United Kingdom
- Long title: An Act to make further provision in relation to the functions of the Historic Buildings and Monuments Commission for England; and for connected purposes.
- Citation: 2002 c. 14
- Territorial extent: England and Wales; Scotland (sections 3 and 8); Northern Ireland (sections 3 and 8); (Note: Section 8(4)–(5).)

Dates
- Royal assent: 1 May 2002
- Commencement: 1 July 2002 (Note: Section 8(2).)
Other legislation
Amends	Ancient Monuments and Archaeological Areas Act 1979; National Heritage Act 1983

Status: Current legislation

Text of statute as originally enacted

Revised text of statute as amended

The National Heritage Act 2002 (c. 14) extended the powers of the Historic Buildings and Monuments Commission to encompass underwater archaeology within the territorial waters of the United Kingdom.

== See also ==
- Listed building
- Scheduled monument
- National Register of Historic Parks and Gardens
- Protection of Wrecks Act 1973
