= All Britain Anti-Poll Tax Federation =

1989–1991 British campaign organisation

- Abbreviation: ABAPTF
- Nickname: The Fed
- Formation: 25 November 1989; 36 years ago
- Founded at: Free Trade Hall, Manchester
- Dissolved: March 1991; 35 years ago
- Merger of: Anti-Poll Tax Unions
- Type: Advocacy group
- Purpose: Abolition of the poll tax
- Location: United Kingdom
- Methods: Tax resistance, political demonstrations
- Chair: Tommy Sheridan

The All Britain Anti-Poll Tax Federation (ABAPTF), commonly known as "the Fed", was an organisation in Great Britain to co-ordinate the activities of local Anti-Poll Tax Unions (APTUs) campaigning against the Poll tax (officially the "Community Charge") brought in by Margaret Thatcher's Conservative government in 1989 (Scotland) and 1990 (England and Wales).

The BBC technicians' union, Broadcasting and Entertainment Trades Alliance (Beta) affiliated to the Fed, unlike many other trade unions.

== Formation ==
In November 1989 the All Britain Anti-Poll Tax Federation was set up largely by the Militant tendency as a national body which included many Anti-Poll Tax Unions.

Prior to the first conference of the Fed, a steering committee was organised by 20 regional anti-poll tax federations, with Tommy Sheridan as chair and had gained the support of 15 Labour MPs.

The first conference was held at Manchester Free Trade Hall on 25 November 1989, attracting around 2000 delegates. It elected a chair, secretary and treasurer as well as a wider steering committee. Fraternal greetings were given by Douggie Daniels from the Manchester Confederation of Engineering Unions, Ken Strath deputy leader of Manchester City Council and a representative from the ambulance workers.

The Scottish Fed had been established a year earlier.

== Mass non-payment campaign ==
The Fed argued for a mass campaign of non-payment of the poll tax, as had been adopted at its founding conference. This view was opposed by some Labour MPs such as Harry Barnes but was supported by groups such as the Militant (part of which later became the Socialist Party) and the Socialist Workers Party. Eventually, up to 18 million people refused to pay the tax.

The committee called a demonstration in London for 31 March 1990. Three days before the event, organisers realised the march would be larger than 60,000 (the capacity of Trafalgar Square) and asked permission from the MPS and the Department of the Environment to divert the march to Hyde Park. The request was denied.

== Demonstrations ==
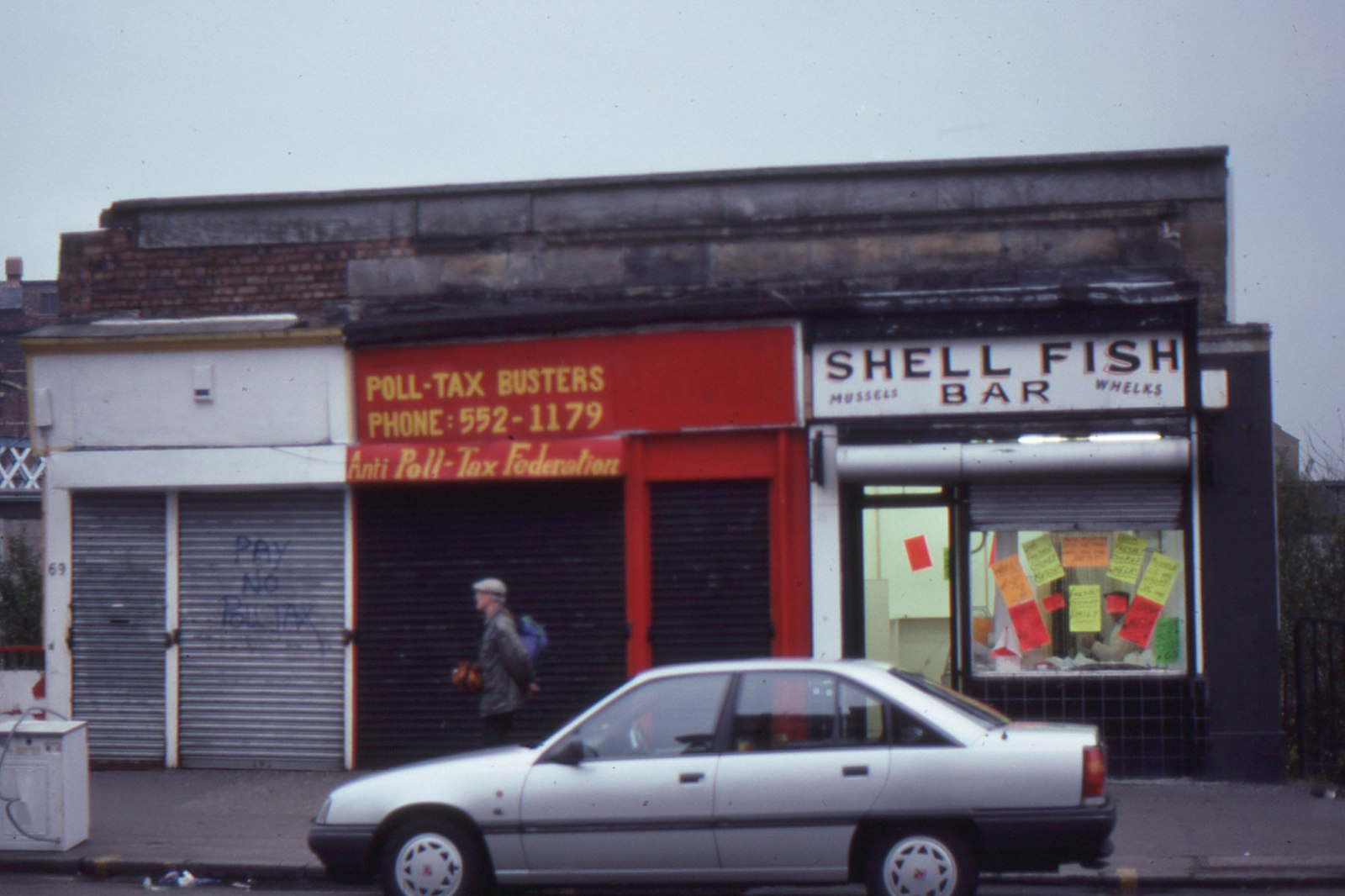
Headquarters of the Anti-Poll Tax Federation in Glasgow

The first demonstrations organised by the Fed were the 200,000 strong demonstration in London, parts of which turned into the Poll Tax Riots, and a simultaneous 50,000 strong demonstration in Glasgow on 31 March 1990. Federation leaders Tommy Sheridan and Steve Nally criticised the participants of the riot, and were said to promise to "name names". However, Militant claimed that this was "totally false" and criticised those such as Roy Hattersley who had called for punishment of those involved.

They also organised a 50,000 strong march in London the following year on 23 March 1991.

== Officers ==
- Chair – Tommy Sheridan (Glasgow)
- Secretary – Steve Nally (Lambeth)
- Treasurer – Maureen Reynolds (Manchester)
- Communications Officer – Kevin Miles (Wallsend) – elected in 1990

== See also ==
- Don't Pay UK
- Scottish Socialist Party (a party that advocates for an alternative to council tax, which the poll tax became from 1993 onwards)
