= National Galleries of Scotland =

Network of art galleries in Scotland

National Galleries Scotland
- Gailearaidhean Nàiseanta na h-Alba

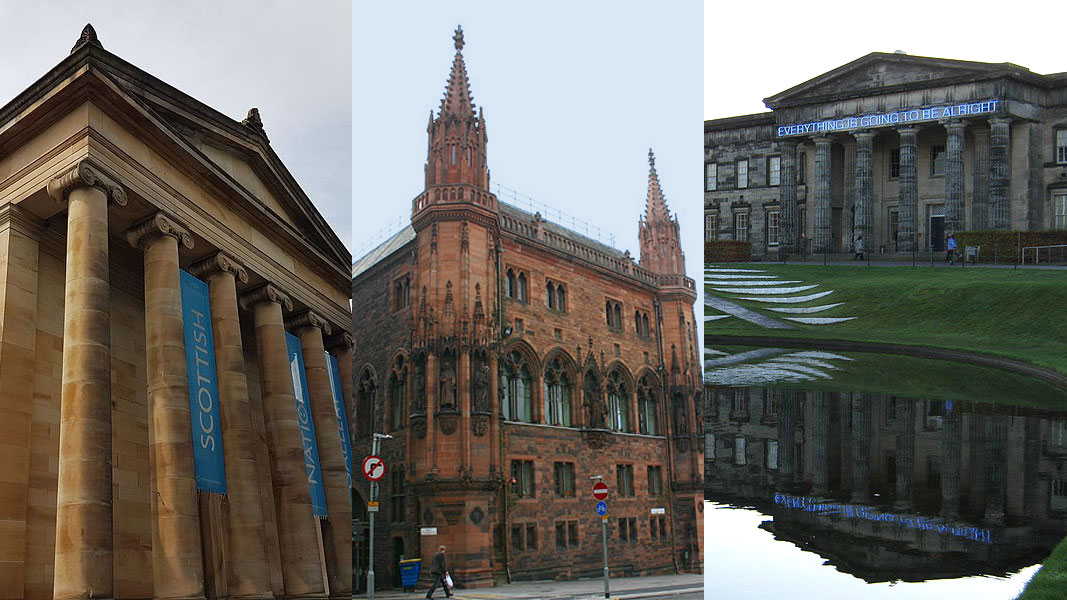
- The three galleries owned by National Galleries of Scotland: (left to right) the National gallery, the Portrait gallery and the Modern gallery

Non Departmental Public Body overview
- Type: Executive Non Departmental Public Body
- Jurisdiction: Scottish Government
- Headquarters: Modern Two, 75 Belford Road, Edinburgh, EH4 3DR; 55°57′07″N 3°13′26″W
- Employees: 327
- Non Departmental Public Body executive: Anne Lyden, Director-General
- Child agencies: Scottish National Gallery; Scottish National Portrait Gallery; Scottish National Gallery of Modern Art; Paxton House; Duff House; Granton Centre for Art
- Key document: National Galleries of Scotland Act 1906 National Heritage (Scotland) Act 1985
- Website: www.nationalgalleries.org

Footnotes
- Charity registered in Scotland (No.SC003728)

The National Galleries of Scotland (Scottish Gaelic: Gailearaidhean Nàiseanta na h-Alba, sometimes also known as National Galleries Scotland) is the executive non-departmental public body that controls the three national galleries of Scotland and two partner galleries, forming part of the National Collections of Scotland.

The purpose of National Galleries Scotland (NGS) was set out by an act of Parliament in the National Galleries of Scotland Act 1906, amended by the National Heritage (Scotland) Act 1985. Its role is to manage the National Galleries of Scotland, care for, preserve and add to the objects in its collections, exhibit artworks to the public and to promote education and public enjoyment and understanding of the Fine Arts. It is governed by a board of trustees who are appointed by ministers of the Scottish Government.

== History ==
National Galleries of Scotland Act 1906 (Note: Section 1.)
- Act of Parliament
- Parliament of the United Kingdom
- Long title: An Act to establish a Board of Trustees to manage the National Galleries of Scotland; and for other purposes.
- Citation: 6 Edw. 7. c. 50
- Territorial extent: Scotland

Dates
- Royal assent: 21 December 1906
- Commencement: 21 December 1906 (Note: The Acts of Parliament (Commencement) Act 1793.)

Other legislation
- Amends: Revenue of Scotland Act 1718; Herring Fishery (Scotland) Act 1808; Public Revenue and Consolidated Fund Charges Act 1854
- Repeals/revokes: Linen and Hempen Manufactures (Scotland) Act 1726; Fisheries (Scotland) Act 1726; Manufactures Improvement Fund (Scotland) Act 1847; National Gallery and Museums (Scotland) Act 1850
- Amended by: Secretaries of State Act 1926; Statute Law Revision Act 1927; National Galleries of Scotland Act 1959; National Heritage (Scotland) Act 1985; Statute Law (Repeals) Act 1986; Museums and Galleries Act 1992; Scotland Act 1998 (Consequential Modifications) (No.2) Order 1999; Public Finance and Accountability (Scotland) Act 2000

Status: Amended

Text of statute as originally enacted

Revised text of statute as amended

Text of the National Galleries of Scotland Act 1906 as in force today (including any amendments) within the United Kingdom, from legislation.gov.uk.

The National Gallery of Scotland (now called the National) was opened to the public in 1859. Located on The Mound in the centre of Scotland's capital city, Edinburgh, the building was originally shared between the National Gallery and the collection of the Royal Scottish Academy (RSA). The gallery was a success, and in response to increasing public demand for the celebration of Scottish history and culture, the Scottish National Portrait Gallery (SNPG) was opened in 1889 to display portraits of noted Scots. The National Gallery collection was nevertheless constrained by lack of space in the premises on The Mound, and the National Galleries of Scotland Act 1906 (6 Edw. 7. c. 50) granted to the RSA perpetual tenancy of the Royal Institution building in front of the National Gallery, allowing the National Galleries collection to take over the entire National Gallery of Scotland building. Since then, the Royal Institution building became known as the Royal Scottish Academy.

In 1959, National Galleries of Scotland expanded further with the establishment of the Scottish National Gallery of Modern Art (SNGMA), housed in Inverleith House in the Royal Botanic Garden Edinburgh. Twentieth-century artworks in the National Galleries collection were relocated to the new gallery, and the gallery began to acquire many more objects after 1960. By 1984, the modern art gallery had outgrown its first home, and the SNGMA relocated to the vacant John Watson's Institution building, a former school. In 1999, the SNGMA expanded with the opening of The Dean Gallery (now called Modern Two) in a former orphanage opposite the Gallery of Modern Art.

In 2012, National Galleries of Scotland underwent a rebranding exercise, and the National Gallery of Scotland building on The Mound was renamed the Scottish National Gallery to distinguish it from the organisation that manages it.

A further rebranding was undertaken in 2023, when a new visual identity was introduced, including a three-dimensional logo consisting of a pair coloured rectangles placed at an angle, said to "evoke the idea of discovery and different perspectives". The names of the individual gallery buildings were considered to be too long, and were given "snappier and more memorable" names within the branding family: National, Portrait and Modern.

== List of national galleries ==
- The Scottish National Gallery
- The Scottish National Portrait Gallery
- The Scottish National Gallery of Modern Art

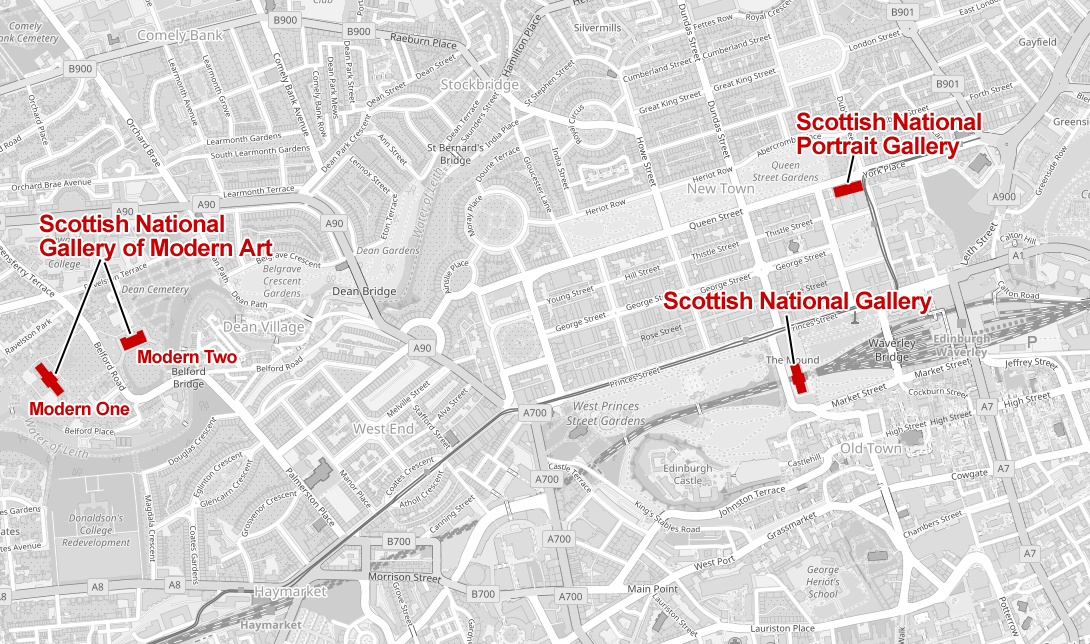
Map of the three National Galleries Scotland premises in Edinburgh

The Partner Galleries are:

- Duff House in Banff, Aberdeenshire
- Paxton House, Berwickshire

== See also ==
- Board of Manufactures
- The Playfair Project
- Scottish Publishers Association
