= Local Government Finance Act 1992 =

Act of the Parliament of the United Kingdom

Local Government Finance Act 1992 (Note: Section 119(1).)
- Act of Parliament
- Parliament of the United Kingdom
- Long title: An Act to provide for certain local authorities to levy and collect a new tax, to be called council tax; to abolish community charges; to make further provision with respect to local government finance (including provision with respect to certain grants by local authorities); and for connected purposes.
- Citation: 1992 c. 14
- Introduced by: Norman Lamont (Commons)
- Territorial extent: England and Wales; Scotland; (Note: Section 119(3)–(4).)

Dates
- Royal assent: 6 March 1992
- Commencement: various (Note: Section 119(2).)

Other legislation
- Amends: International Organisations Act 1968; Pensions (Increase) Act 1971; Water (Scotland) Act 1980; Local Government Finance Act 1988; Human Fertilisation and Embryology Act 1990; Social Security Contributions and Benefits Act 1992; Social Security Administration Act 1992
- Repeals/revokes: Abolition of Domestic Rates Etc. (Scotland) Act 1987
- Amended by: Tribunals and Inquiries Act 1992; Justices of the Peace Act 1997; Statute Law (Repeals) Act 1998; National Health Service (Consequential Provisions) Act 2006; Co-operative and Community Benefit Societies Act 2014; Cities and Local Government Devolution Act 2016; Policing and Crime Act 2017; Sentencing Act 2020; Renters' Rights Act 2025

Status: Amended

Text of statute as originally enacted

Revised text of statute as amended

Text of the Local Government Finance Act 1992 as in force today (including any amendments) within the United Kingdom, from legislation.gov.uk.

The Local Government Finance Act 1992 (c. 14) is an act of the Parliament of the United Kingdom. The act includes obligations of the occupants or (in the case of vacant properties and houses in multiple occupation) the owners of properties in the United Kingdom (except Northern Ireland) to pay Council Tax. It repealed large sections of the Local Government Finance Act 1988, which introduced the unpopular Community Charge (known as the "poll tax"), which was replaced by the new Council Tax.
