= Non-Domestic Rating Act 2023 =

Act of the Parliament of the United Kingdom

Non-Domestic Rating Act 2023 (Note: Section 20.)
- Act of Parliament
- Parliament of the United Kingdom
- Long title: An Act to make provision about non-domestic rating.
- Citation: 2023 c. 53
- Introduced by: Michael Gove, Secretary of State for Levelling Up, Housing and Communities (Commons); The Baroness Scott of Bybrook, Parliamentary Under-Secretary of State for Faith and Communities (Lords)
- Territorial extent: England and Wales; Northern Ireland (section 11); (Note: Section 18.)

Dates
- Royal assent: 26 October 2023
- Commencement: Various (Note: Section 19.)
Other legislation
| Amends | National Heritage Act 1980; Local Government Finance Act 1988; Local Government and Rating Act 1997; Postal Services Act 2000; Local Government Act 2003; Business Rate Supplements Act 2009; Corporation Tax Act 2010; Localism Act 2011; Postal Services Act 2011; Non-Domestic Rating (Chargeable Amounts) (England) Regulations 2022 |
| Repeals/revokes | Rating (Former Agricultural Premises and Rural Shops) Act 2001; Rating (Empty Properties) Act 2007; Telecommunications Infrastructure (Relief from Non-Domestic Rates) Act 2018; Non-Domestic Rating (Preparation for Digital Services) Act 2019; Non-Domestic Rating (Public Lavatories) Act 2021 |
| Amended by | Local Government Finance (Wales) Act 2024 |

Status: Amended

History of passage through Parliament

Text of statute as originally enacted

Revised text of statute as amended

The Non-Domestic Rating Act 2023 (c. 53) is an act of the Parliament of the United Kingdom.

The act's aim is to reform the business rates system in England and Wales and reduce business rates for smaller businesses. It was in the government's plans for tackling high prices and which mechanisms were put in place.

== Parliamentary passage ==
The bill for the act was introduced to the House of Commons by Michael Gove on 11 May 2022 and had its third reading in the House of Lords, after being introduced by Baroness Scott of Bybrook, on 13 June 2023. The act was agreed to in its final form during the wash-up period leading up to the 2023 prorogation of Parliament on 25 October 2023 and received royal assent on 26 October 2023.
