= Poll tax (Great Britain) =

Controversial system of taxation from 1989 to 1993

A leaflet explaining the Community Charge (the so-called "poll tax"), Department of the Environment, April 1989

The Community Charge, colloquially known as the poll tax, was a system of local taxation introduced by Margaret Thatcher's government, whereby each taxpayer was taxed the same fixed sum (a "poll tax" or "head tax"), with the precise amount being set by each local authority. Enabled by the passage of the Local Government Finance Act 1988, the Charge replaced domestic rates in Scotland from 1989, and from 1990, it was similarly introduced into England and Wales. The repeal of the poll tax was announced in 1991, and in 1993, the current system of the Council Tax was instated.

Since the 1970s, the Conservative Party under Thatcher aimed to do away with the domestic rating system, which funded local government by levying taxes based on property valuation. By the 1980s, the system had become a significant point of friction between several Labour-controlled local councils and Thatcher's government, the latter of whom sought to limit the taxation and spending powers of the former via the Rates Act 1984. At the same time, criticism mounted that the periodic revaluations required by the rating system were not being carried out effectively.

The Charge replaced the rating system's valuation-based tax on property with a fixed tax on individuals, with limited adjustment for a person's financial circumstance. As such, it was viewed as regressive and engendered public opposition. Tens of thousands attended demonstrations that sometimes boiled over into riots, the largest of which injured more than 100 in Trafalgar Square on 31 March 1990.

Local councils often struggled to collect the tax, especially in areas with large numbers of transient renters. Many individuals avoided or actively resisted payment, and in England and Wales an estimated £1.2 billion went uncollected in the first year of the Charge.

The tax proved to be a fatal blow to Thatcher's premiership. In the 1990 Conservative Party leadership election, she lost on the first ballot to three contenders who all vowed to abolish the Charge. Its replacement with the Council Tax, based on property valuation, was announced by the Conservative government of John Major in 1991, formalised via the Local Government Finance Act 1992, and enacted on 1 January 1993. Some councils chased poll tax arrears for decades afterward; Scotland put an end to the practice in 2015 and wrote off a total of £425 million in debt.

== Origins ==
The abolition of the rating system of taxes (based on the notional rental value of a house) to fund local government had been unveiled by Margaret Thatcher when she was Shadow Environment Secretary in 1974, and was included in the manifesto of the Conservative Party in the October 1974 general election. In the 1979 elections the Conservative manifesto stated that lowering income tax took priority. The Government published a green paper in 1981 under the title Alternatives to Domestic Rates. It considered a flat-rate per-capita tax as a supplement to another tax, noting that a large flat-rate tax would be seen as unfair.

The 1980s saw a period of general confrontation between central government and Labour-controlled local authorities over levels of expenditure (known as the "rate-capping rebellion"), which eventually led to the abolition of the Greater London Council and the six metropolitan county councils. The commitment to abolish the rates was replaced in the 1983 general election manifesto with a commitment to introduce the ability for central government to cap rates which it saw as excessive. This was introduced by the Rates Act 1984.

Although the rates system was supposed to have regular revaluations to minimise discrepancies, the revaluations in England and Wales had been cancelled in 1978 and 1983. The Scottish revaluation of 1985/1986 led to a great deal of criticism and gave added urgency to rates reform or replacement.

The green paper of 1986, Paying for Local Government, produced by the Department of the Environment from consultations between Lord Rothschild, William Waldegrave and Kenneth Baker, proposed the poll tax. This was a fixed tax per adult resident, although there was a reduction for poor people. This charged each person for the services provided in their community. Owing to the variations in the amount of local taxes paid and the amount of grant provided by central government to individual local authorities, there were differences in the amount charged between councils.

It become known as the "poll tax" as this is a general term referring to a tax charged at an equal amount per head (also known as a head-tax), but also as a reference to historical unpopular head-taxes, in particular the English poll taxes of 1376–1381.

This proposal was contained in the Conservative manifesto for the 1987 General Election. The legislation introducing the poll tax was passed as part of the Local Government Finance Act 1988, and the new tax replaced the rates in Scotland from the start of the 1989/90 financial year and in England and Wales from the start of the 1990/91 financial year. Additionally, the Uniform Business Rate, levied by local government at a rate set by central government and then apportioned between local authorities in proportion to their population, was introduced.

The tax was not implemented in Northern Ireland, which continued, as it still does as of 2026, to levy the rating system.

== Implementation ==
The poll tax went into effect on 1 April 1990. It encountered a number of administrative and enforcement difficulties. The initial register, which was based on the rates register for "owned" houses, contained many irregularities from supplementary data sources such as housing benefit recipients. Councils attempted to compile registers of taxpayers from sources such as the electoral register and university enrollment data. Some renters did not pay, knowing they would have moved elsewhere by the time the bills arrived. Councils of towns with highly mobile populations, such as university towns, were faced with big store rooms of unprocessed "gone-aways". The nature of the shared house market meant that not even the landlord knew exactly who was living there; tenants were replaced and may have shared a "single" room with their partner. Therefore, the local council did not know who was living where and when.

Thatcher herself was warned in writing by Westminster City Council for failing to register for the poll tax at 10 Downing Street, reflecting widespread uncertainty among even the Charge's architects about the details of its implementation.

A significant collection issue was the 20 per cent / 100 per cent split. People in employment had to pay 100 per cent, while students and the registered unemployed paid 20 per cent. Full exemption from the tax was rare, and included the mentally disabled and members of enclosed religious orders.

Councils were burdened with the task of pursuing the large numbers of defaulters, many of whom were participating in organised resistance to the charge, and some councils attempted increasingly dramatic tactics to induce payment. On 15 January 1990, Strathclyde Regional Council issued 250000 summary warrants to those who had not paid. Sheriffs who attempted to recoup the tax debt by poinding were often harassed by demonstrators, who at one point raided the Council's offices and destroyed records of nonpayers.

There is also some evidence that the poll tax had a lasting effect of people not registering themselves on the electoral register to evade collection attempts, possibly because of the false impression that the words "poll tax" created. This may have affected the results of the 1992 general election, which ended in a fourth successive Conservative victory, despite most opinion polls pointing to a hung parliament or narrow Labour majority.

In the first year of the poll tax in England and Wales, an estimated £1.2 billion was not collected.

== Opposition ==
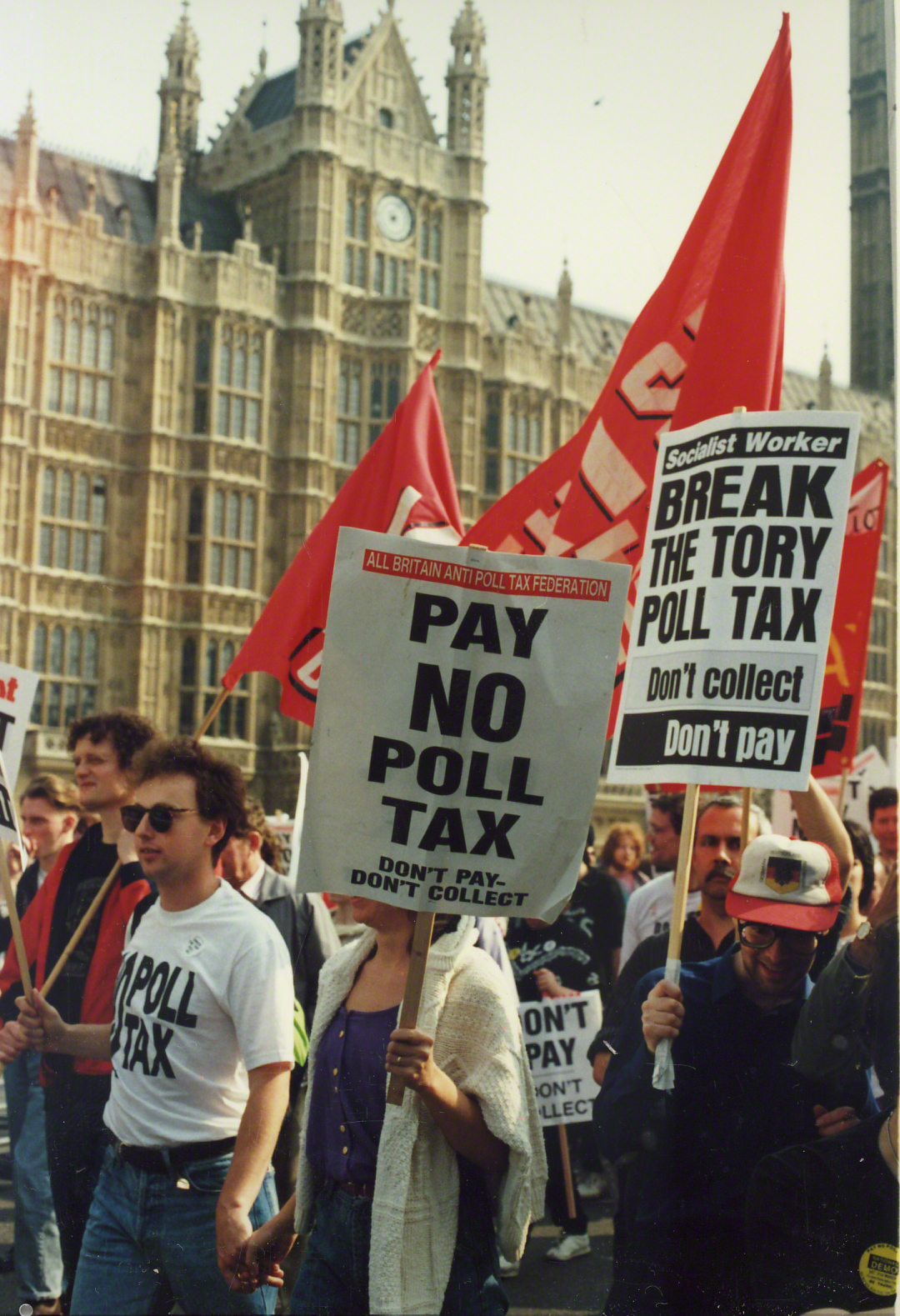
People demonstrating against the poll tax on 31 March 1990

The change from payment based on the worth of one's house to a fixed rate was widely criticised as being unfair, and needlessly burdensome on those less well-off. Mass protests were co-ordinated by the All Britain Anti-Poll Tax Federation, other national networks such as 3D (Don't Register, Don't Pay, Don't Collect) and by hundreds of local Anti-Poll Tax Unions (APTUs), which were not aligned to any particular political grouping. In Scotland, where the tax was implemented first, the APTUs called for mass non-payment. As the tax neared its implementation in England, protests against it began to increase. That culminated in a number of poll tax riots. The most serious of those was on 31 March 1990, the eve of the tax's implementation, when between 70,000 and 200,000 people demonstrated around Trafalgar Square. The demonstration left 113 people injured and 340 under arrest, with over 100 police officers needing treatment for injuries. There were further conflicts and protests, but none on the scale of the Trafalgar Square riot.

As the amount of the poll tax began to rise and the inefficiency of local councils in their collection of the tax became apparent, large numbers of people refused to pay. Local councils tried to respond with enforcement measures, but they were largely ineffective given the huge numbers of non-payers. According to the British Broadcasting Corporation, up to 30 per cent of former ratepayers in some areas refused to pay.

The anti-poll-tax organisations encouraged non-payers not to register, to clog up the courts by contesting local council attempts to gain liability orders, and ultimately, not to attend court hearings arising from their non-compliance. In November 1990, South Yorkshire Police said they were planning to refuse to arrest poll tax defaulters, even when instructed to by the courts, because it would be "physically impossible for the police because of the large number of defaulters".

The opposition Labour Party, at its 1988 annual conference, had decided against support for a non-payment campaign. In July 1991, Terry Fields, Labour Member of Parliament (MP) for Liverpool Broadgreen, and a member of the Militant tendency, was imprisoned for sixty days for refusing to pay. At the time of Fields' jailing, Labour leader Neil Kinnock commented: "Law makers must not be law breakers."

In popular culture, the punk band The Exploited featured the song "Don't Pay The Poll Tax" in their album The Massacre, which was released on 15 April 1990.

Over 40 people collaborated on Punk Aide's 1989 compilations Axe The Tax, Can't Pay Won't Pay and Fuck The Poll Tax. Oi Polloi and Chumbawamba released and toured an EP called Smash the Poll Tax. A compilation album, A Pox Upon The Poll Tax, was also released in 1989. The Orchids released "Defy The Law" in response to the Poll Tax.

On their 22 March 1990 Top Of The Pops appearance, Orbital performed "Chime" while wearing hoodies with a crosshair and seemingly abstract images on them. Upon closer inspection, those images read "no poll tax".

== Political consequences ==
After the poll tax was announced, opinion polls showed the Labour opposition opening a strong lead over the Conservative government. Following the Poll Tax Riots, Conservative ministers contemplated abolition of the tax but knew that, as a flagship Thatcherite policy, its abolition would not be possible while Thatcher was still Prime Minister. Kinnock had vowed to abolish the poll tax if he won the next general election.

For this, among other reasons, Thatcher was challenged by Michael Heseltine for the Conservative leadership in November 1990. Although she prevailed by a margin of fifty votes, she narrowly missed the threshold to avoid a second vote, and on 22 November 1990 she announced her resignation after more than a decade in office. All three of the contenders to succeed her pledged to abandon the tax.

The successful candidate, John Major, appointed Heseltine to the post of Environment Secretary, responsible for replacing the poll tax. In early 1991 the Chancellor of the Exchequer, Norman Lamont, announced a rise in Value Added Tax from 15 to 17.5 per cent to pay for a £140 reduction in the tax. The abolition of the poll tax was announced on 21 March 1991.

The Conservative government was re-elected for a fourth successive term in office at the 1992 general election, shaking off the strong challenge from the Labour Party. The Labour Party leader, Neil Kinnock, resigned, having seen his party defeated in this way.

== Abolition ==
The Local Government Finance Act 1992 replaced the Community Charge with the Council Tax, and went into effect from 1 January 1993.

Council Tax strongly resembled the domestic rates system that had been in effect prior to the poll tax. The main differences (at the Council Tax's inception) were that properties were placed in bands based on a range of property values, thereby capping the maximum amount, and that the tax was levied on the property's capital value rather than on its notional rental value. Households with only one occupant were also entitled to a 25 per cent discount. The only substantial change since the introduction of the Council Tax form of direct taxation is the gradual introduction of certain exemptions and discounts.

Community Charge Debt (Scotland) Act 2015
- Act of the Scottish Parliament
- Scottish Parliament
- Long title: An Act of the Scottish Parliament to extinguish various liabilities arising by virtue of the Abolition of Domestic Rates Etc. (Scotland) Act 1987.
- Citation: 2015 asp 3

Dates
- Royal assent: 25 March 2015

Text of statute as originally enacted

Text of the Community Charge Debt (Scotland) Act 2015 as in force today (including any amendments) within the United Kingdom, from legislation.gov.uk.

== Aftereffects ==
The Scottish government continued to collect poll tax debt for two decades after the Charge was abolished. The government collected £396000 in 2013, and in 2014 figured that more than £425 million of debt was outstanding. The following year, the remaining debt was written off with the passage of the Community Charge Debt (Scotland) Act 2015 (asp 3).

== See also ==
- Poll tax riots
- Peasants' Revolt – 14th-century rebellion against serfdom and the imposition of a poll tax
- Tommy Sheridan, Scottish socialist who originally came to prominence protesting against the poll tax
- Bedroom tax
- Window tax
- Poll tax
