= Lyons Inquiry =

English local government inquiry

The Lyons Inquiry was an independent inquiry into the form, function and funding of local government in England. Appointed jointly by the Chancellor of the Exchequer (Gordon Brown) and the Deputy Prime Minister (John Prescott) in the summer of 2004, Sir Michael Lyons produced several reports over the next 3 years, culminating in a final report on the future of local government published alongside the Chancellor's Budget in March 2007.

== Origins of the Inquiry ==
While local government activities in England are financed from a variety of sources, including central government grant, the key local taxes since 1992 have been the uniform business rate (set centrally but collected locally) and council tax. Both are property taxes, based on the rental or resale value of a property at a given point in time.

The Local Government Act 2003 introduced a commitment to revalue all domestic properties in England and Wales, for the purposes of calculating council tax bills, by 2007. This would have been the first revaluation to take place since council tax was introduced in 1993.

Following that Act, the Government commissioned a Balance of Funding review, which reported with recommendations in July 2004. At the same time, a House of Commons Select Committee conducted an inquiry into local government revenue, again reporting their conclusions in July 2004.

== Initial Inquiry ==
In July 2004 the Government appointed Sir Michael Lyons to undertake a comprehensive Inquiry into local government funding, focussing in particular on:

- the most pressing issues affecting local government funding
- how council tax should be reformed
- other possible sources of local funding, such as local income tax, reformed non-domestic rates and other local taxes and charges
- the implications for the financing of possible elected regional assemblies

Work on the Inquiry began in ernest in October 2004, and encompassed the commissioning of research and a number of public consultation events.

In November 2004, the voters in North East England rejected a proposal for an Elected Regional Assembly, following which the Government abandoned its plans to proceed with the introduction elected assemblies across England.

== First extension of the Inquiry's remit ==
In September 2005, the Government announced its decision to delay the revaluation of domestic properties by 2007, citing the ongoing Lyons Inquiry as a key reason for the delay. At the same time, the Government agreed an extension to his Inquiry with Sir Michael, "to cover questions relating to the functions of local government and its future role, as well as how it is funded."

The Inquiry published an interim report in December 2005, which detailed the work conducted on local government funding and invited views on the future form and function of local government. The report included detailed analyses of possible council tax reforms; conclusions on other potential local government revenue streams were not included in the document.

Following the extension to his remit, Sir Michael launched a year-long, multi-stranded consultation exercise with a wide range of groups, as well as commissioning new research.

In April 2006 the Government introduced the Dedicated Schools Grant, a ring-fenced grant to local authorities which could only be spent on schools. This marked a significant change in the structure of local government funding, as education was by far the largest service for which local authorities in England were responsible.

Sir Michael Lyons published his second report in May 2006. In this report, he concentrated on the form and function of local government in England. Key points included:

- an analysis of future pressures on local government
- the need to clarify the role between central and local government
- the concept of 'place shaping', and the role of local government in promoting economic, social and environmental well-being of communities

In October 2006 the Government published a White Paper on the future of Local Government. While the White Paper took on board some of the Inquiry's recommendations - for instance the concept of place-shaping - it was criticised in some quarters for being published before the Inquiry had finished its work on local government funding arrangements.

== Second extension of the Inquiry's remit ==
Following the extension of his remit, Sir Michael had planned to publish his final report before the end of 2006. In December the Government announced that it had asked Sir Michael to further extend his Inquiry to take into account a set of other reports commissioned by the Chancellor.

== Final report ==
The Inquiry's Final Report, Place-shaping: a shared ambition for the future of local government was published on 21 March 2007, on the same day as the Chancellor's annual budget statement. In an accompanying Press Notice Sir Michael announced that his short term recommendations included:

- greater flexibility for local authorities to place-shape with less control from the centre - by reducing specific and ring fenced grants, a new power to levy a supplementary business rate in consultation with business, and a new power to charge for domestic waste to help manage pressures on council tax, and an end to capping of council tax;
- changes to improve fairness of council tax, recognising that council tax benefit is a rebate, automating the system to ensure 1.8billion pounds in unclaimed benefit helps the poorest households, and raising the savings limit for pensioners to 50,000 pounds;
- improving transparency in the funding system by being clear about the contribution made by national taxation, and ensuring a more independent voice to inform Parliament and the public; and
- improving incentives for local authorities to promote economic prosperity and growth, initially through reform of the Local Authority Business Growth Incentives Scheme.

In the medium term, he advised that the Government should:

- revalue council tax to update the tax base and improve fairness;
- at the same time, reform council tax by adding new bands to reduce bills for those in the lowest value properties, paid for by increased bills for those in higher value properties paying more - there should be no increase in average council tax bills as a result of this;
- consider assigning a fixed proportion of income tax to local government;
- find ways to improve the incentives within the grant system; and
- consider introducing the power to levy a tourist tax if local government makes a strong case based on local public support - this would be appropriate only in some areas.

In the longer term, Sir Michael said that future governments could consider more radical reform options such as local income tax or re-localisation of the business rate, but these reforms may require greater public support and understanding than currently exists.
