= Michael Lyons (BBC chairman) =

British politician (born 1949)

Sir Michael Lyons
- Born: Michael Thomas Lyons; 15 September 1949 (age 77)
- Education: Middlesex University, and Queen Mary & Westfield College
- Employer(s): English Cities Fund, BBC Trust
- Political party: Labour Party
- Children: 3

Sir Michael Thomas Lyons (born 15 September 1949) is a British politician and former chairman of the BBC Trust (now the BBC Board). He currently serves as non-executive chairman of the English Cities Fund and chairs the board of the SQW Group.

A former British Labour Party councillor and council chief executive in the United Kingdom, he was involved in some of the key central government commissions and reports into local government finance from 2000 to 2007.

== Career ==
Michael Lyons was educated at Stratford Grammar School, London, Middlesex University, and Queen Mary & Westfield College, University of London. Whilst completing his formal education, he worked for two years as a part-time street trader at Bell St Market, London. Lyons then worked as a lecturer in economics at Wallbrook College, London, and the University of Nottingham.

Lyons worked in the public sector as an economist, and between 1980 and 1983 served as an elected Labour councillor on Birmingham City Council. He then became Chief Executive of three significant local authorities: Wolverhampton Borough Council (1985–90); Nottinghamshire County Council (1990–94); and finally Birmingham City Council (1994–2001).

In 2004 he was the chaired two successful government projects: the Review of Public Sector Relocation on behalf of the Chancellor and prime minister, and the Corporate Governance Commission on behalf of Cardiff City Council. He was Deputy Chairman of the Audit Commission for two years until October 2006, including a period as acting chairman. In March 2007, he published the final report and recommendations from his three-year independent inquiry into the future role, function and funding of local government.

Lyons was the Head of Inlogov, the leading Local Government Public Policy school in the United Kingdom at Birmingham University from 2001 to 2006, and was awarded an honorary LL.D by Birmingham University in 2009. He also holds an honorary doctorate from Middlesex University.

Lyons served as a governor of the Royal Shakespeare Company as well as a non-executive director on the boards of Mouchel, Wragge & Co Solicitors and SQW Group Ltd. A former chairman of the City of Birmingham Symphony Orchestra and former member of the boards of City Pride, Birmingham Marketing Partnership and Millennium Point Property Trust Company, he was also previously a director of Central Independent Television, until 1993.

He was knighted in January 2000 for Services to Local Government.

In 2022 he chaired the Independent Review of Invest Northern Ireland.

== BBC chairman ==
On 1 May 2007, Lyons was appointed Chairman of the BBC Trust, following Michael Grade's departure to become Executive Chairman of rival broadcaster ITV. On 3 August 2007, a House of Lords all-party select committee criticised the appointment process, claiming government ministers had too much influence over his appointment. Lyons dismissed the allegations, pledging "absolute independence and impartiality".

On 14 September 2010, Lyons announced that he would serve for only one four-year term and would not seek reappointment in May 2011. He was succeeded in May 2011 by Chris Patten.

== Housing Commission ==
At Labour Party Conference 2013, the Leader of the Opposition, Ed Miliband, launched a Housing Commission to review public policy of Housing in the United Kingdom. Sir Michael Lyons headed this commission and published the report on 16 October 2014.

A summary of the initial parameters was given by Civic Voice:

Sir Michael Lyons has identified a number of key areas on which he would like to focus:

1. The land market
2. Investment in housing and infrastructure
3. The role of a new generation of New Towns and Garden Cities
4. Co-operation between adjoining local authorities in the planning process.
5. Sharing the benefit of development with local communities.

== Personal ==
Lyons is married with three children and lives in Sutton Coldfield, Birmingham.

Media offices
Preceded by Chitra Bharucha as Acting Chair of the BBC Trust	Chair of the BBC Trust; 1 May 2007 – 30 April 2011	Succeeded by Chris Patten
