= Agency Workers Regulations 2010 =

United Kingdom statutory instrument in labour law

Agency Workers Regulations 2010 (Note: Section 1(1).)
- Statutory Instrument
- Parliament of the United Kingdom
- Citation: SI 2010/93
- Territorial extent: England and Wales; Scotland; (Note: Section 1(2).)

Dates
- Made: 20 January 2010
- Laid before Parliament: 21 January 2010
- Commencement: 1 October 2011
Other legislation
Amends	Employment Tribunals Act 1996; Employment Rights Act 1996
Made under	European Communities Act 1972; Health and Safety at Work etc. Act 1974
Transposes	Directive 2008/104/EC

Status: Amended

Text of statute as originally enacted

Text of the Agency Workers Regulations 2010 as in force today (including any amendments) within the United Kingdom, from legislation.gov.uk.

The Agency Workers Regulations 2010 (SI 2010/93) are a statutory instrument forming part of United Kingdom labour law. They aim to combat discrimination against people who work for employment agencies, by stating that agency workers should be no less favourably treated in pay and working time than their full-time counterparts who undertake the same work. It gives effect in UK law to the European Union's Temporary and Agency Workers Directive.

== Background ==
The Temporary and Agency Workers (Prevention of Less Favourable Treatment) Bill, introduced by Paul Farrelly MP was talked out in 2007. Almost identical, the new (Equal Treatment) Bill has had real support and success in Parliament when introduced by Andrew Miller MP.

The regulations were the culmination of a succession of attempts to improve rights for agency workers. A previous proposal, the Temporary and Agency Workers (Equal Treatment) Bill 2008, was introduced in the British parliament, designed to secure equal pay and terms for working time between vulnerable agency workers and their permanent staff counterparts. It has now been superseded by (though it was in all material respects identical to) by the Temporary and Agency Workers Directive (2008/104/EC), which the UK was required to transpose into UK law by December 2011 at the latest.

The bill had been introduced by a private member, Labour backbencher Andrew Miller MP, and would have formed an important part of the United Kingdom agency worker law, and an addition to the growing categories of employment discrimination law in the UK. The bill's substance is modelled on a proposed European Directive, which has been blocked by the UK government since 2002. However the government had recently indicated that it would introduce a modified version of the bill, through a statutory instrument under the European Communities Act 1972 to implement the TAW Directive, with a 12-week (3-month) waiting period before agency workers will get equal pay and working time conditions.

The bill has been supported by a majority of the Labour Party, and trade unions, and vigorously opposed by the Conservative Party and the CBI. The calls for legislation have been bolstered by the particularly vulnerable position of people who work for agencies. They lack almost all of the rights guaranteed for normal workers from the Employment Rights Act 1996. However the legislation does not seek to make any but minor alterations for the position of agency workers on this front.

The bill is modelled, more or less directly, on the proposals put forward by the European Commission for a draft Temporary Agency Worker Directive (COD 2002/0149). This proposal was itself shelved, because of the UK government's consistent opposition to agency regulation, in the interests of labour market flexibility. According to newspaper reports, the UK got the backing of Germany to torpedo the draft Directive in return for the UK to help sink the Takeover Directive (Germany has comprehensive agency work regulation under its Arbeitnehmerüberlassungsgesetz and its Civil Code, especially §622, and the UK has strong Takeover Regulation, especially Rule 21 of the City Code). The significant difference between the proposed directive and the bill is that the former UK government managed to insert a 6-week qualification period in the directive before the equal treatment rights click in (Art. 5(4)). The bill has no proposed qualification period, though voices in the City have been calling for this to be one year. The latest reports suggest a 12-week qualifying period has been agreed between the private MP backers and the government, meaning a significant step back from the protection the directive would offer. The directive included equal treatment only pay, hours, parental rights and anti-discrimination (Art. 3(1)(d)). A significant omission therefore was any regulation on reasonable notice before dismissal (in the UK, ERA s.86; Germany has this for all workers already, regardless of their agency status, §622 BGB).

Before the 2005 United Kingdom general election, the trade unions and the government made the so-called Warwick Agreement (after its signing place, the University of Warwick). This included a promise on the government's part to reverse its opposition to the European Directive. But by 2007, the government was yet to deliver, and Paul Farrelly MP introduced the Temporary and Agency Workers (Prevention of Less Favourable Treatment) Bill. It mirrored the directive in all respects, save that there would be no six-week qualifying period. In that period's climate, the bill did not gain enough attention and was talked out of time. In the Court of Appeal case James v. Greenwich LBC which further entrenched the subordinate position of agency workers, Mummery LJ pronounced it "doomed to failure for lack of support from the Government". But no sooner as that had been said, almost exactly the same bill was reintroduced by Andrew Miller MP, with a small title change to emphasise "Equal Treatment" rather than "Prevention of Less Favourable Treatment". Identical in every way, save a tighter definition of employment agency and more provision for regulatory enforcement, it won the support of almost the whole Labour bench in the House of Commons. It was being heard in committee each Wednesday morning as from 7 May. As of 21 May, the government has signalled that it will allow something similar to the bill, but not the bill itself, to be passed. It will incorporate a 12-week waiting period before the right to equal pay and time off begins, or six6 weeks less protection than the original 2002 directive.

== Scope ==
The Agency Workers Regulations aim to give effect to the Temporary and Agency Workers Directive in UK law. They require employers to treat agency workers and permanent staff equally in their contract terms on:

- Hours and holiday time
- Pay, including sick pay
- Time off for parenting (for women only)
- Discrimination law (though this is unnecessary because agency workers are already explicitly covered by the Equality Act 2010).

== See also ==
- United Kingdom labour law
- United Kingdom agency worker law
- Employment Agencies Act 1973
- Gangmasters (Licensing) Act 2004
- Employment Agency Standards Inspectorate

== Bibliography ==
- N Countouris, 'The Temporary Agency Work Directive: Another Broken Promise?' [2009] 38(3) ILJ 329
- E McGaughey, 'Should Agency Workers be Treated Differently?' (2010) SSRN
