= Public employment service =

Government program

A public employment service is a government's organization which matches employers to employees.

== History ==
One of the oldest references to a public employment agency was in 1650, when Henry Robinson proposed an "Office of Addresses and Encounters" that would link employers to workers. The English Parliament rejected the proposal, but he himself opened such a business, although it was short-lived.

Since the beginning of the twentieth century, every developed country has created a public employment agency as a way to combat unemployment and help people find work. In 1988, public employment services from six countries founded the World Association of Public Employment Services. As of 2016, 85 PES from all over the world have joined the association.

== Public employment service by country ==
=== United Kingdom ===
In the United Kingdom the first agency began in London, through the Labour Bureau (London) Act 1902, and subsequently went nationwide, a movement prompted by the Liberal government through the Labour Exchanges Act 1909. The present public provider of job search help is called Jobcentre Plus.

=== United States ===
In the United States, a federal programme of employment services was rolled out in the New Deal. The initial legislation was called the Wagner-Peyser Act of 1933. More recently, job services happen through one-stop centers established by the Workforce Investment Act of 1998, reformed by the Workforce Innovation and Opportunity Act of 2013.

=== Other countries ===
- Pôle emploi, France's Public employment service
- Hello Work (Japanese government's Employment Service Center)
- PESO (Public Employment Service agency of the Philippines)
- Public Employment Service (Lithuania)
- AMS, Austria (Arbeitsmarktservice)
- Bundesagentur für Arbeit, (Federal employment agency of Germany)
- PSZ, Poland (Publiczne Służby Zatrudnienia)
- Hellenic Manpower Employment Organization, Greece (Οργανισμός Απασχολήσεως Εργατικού Δυναμικού (ΟΑΕΔ))

== See also ==
- Employment agency
- UK agency worker law
