= Employment Act 1990 =

Act of the Parliament of the United Kingdom

Employment Act 1990 (Note: Section 18(1).)
- Act of Parliament
- Parliament of the United Kingdom
- Long title: An Act to make it unlawful to refuse employment, or any service of an employment agency, on grounds related to trade union membership; to amend the law relating to industrial action and ballots; to make further provision with respect to the Commissioner for the Rights of Trade Union Members; to confer a power to revise or revoke Codes of Practice; to provide for the merger of the Redundancy Fund with the National Insurance Fund; to amend the Education (Work Experience) Act 1973; and for connected purposes.
- Citation: 1990 c. 38
- Territorial extent: United Kingdom

Dates
- Royal assent: 1 November 1990
- Commencement: various (Note: Section 18(2)–(3).)
Other legislation
Amended by	Trade Union and Labour Relations (Consolidation) Act 1992; Employment Tribunals Act 1996; Employment Rights Act 1996; Education Act 1996

Status: Amended

Text of statute as originally enacted

Revised text of statute as amended

Text of the Employment Act 1990 as in force today (including any amendments) within the United Kingdom, from legislation.gov.uk.

The Employment Act 1990 (c. 38) is an act of the Parliament of the United Kingdom.

The act, a piece of industrial relations legislation, banned closed shops, which had already been restricted by the Employment Act 1982 by requiring 80-85% to support them (such an impractical requirement that they had been effectively almost banned). It also banned secondary action in industrial disputes, again building on restrictions on that form of picketing introduced by the Employment Act 1980.
