= Employment Act 2008 =

Act of the Parliament of the United Kingdom

Employment Act 2008 (Note: Section 23.)
- Act of Parliament
- Parliament of the United Kingdom
- Long title: An Act to make provision about the procedure for the resolution of employment disputes; to provide for compensation for financial loss in cases of unlawful underpayment or non-payment; to make provision about the enforcement of minimum wages legislation and the application of the national minimum wage to Cadet Force Adult Volunteers and voluntary workers; to make provision about the enforcement of offences under the Employment Agencies Act 1973; to make provision about the right of trade unions to expel or exclude members on the grounds of membership of a political party; and for connected purposes.
- Citation: 2008 c. 24
- Introduced by: Pat McFadden, Minister of State, Department for Business, Enterprise and Regulatory Reform (Commons)
- Territorial extent: United Kingdom (Note: Section 21.)

Dates
- Royal assent: 13 November 2008
- Commencement: Various (Note: Section 22.)
Other legislation
Amends	Agricultural Wages Act 1948; Employment Tribunals Act 1996; Employment Rights Act 1996; Tribunals, Courts and Enforcement Act 2007
Amended by	Employment Rights Act 2025

Status: Amended

History of passage through Parliament

Text of statute as originally enacted

Revised text of statute as amended

The Employment Act 2008 (c. 24) is an act of the Parliament of the United Kingdom which reformed a wide range of different provisions of UK labour law. It is an amending statute, and therefore simply altered pre-existing law to remedy perceived problems in the law's operation to do with dispute resolution, strengthen enforcement of the minimum wage and employment agency standards and to conform with updated case law on trade unions, in particular, ASLEF v United Kingdom.

== Provisions ==
The act strengthened the enforcement framework for the National Minimum Wage.

=== Sections 1-7, dispute resolution ===
Through the Employment Act 2002 the government had introduced a mandatory statutory dismissal procedure, which had been designed to be followed in any case. If employers did not follow the procedure before dismissing their employees, the dismissal would be deemed automatically unfair. This meant that any employer who did not follow the mandatory procedure precisely could face severe penalties, even when acting in good faith. Section 1 repealed that part of the EA 2002 (and with it ERA 1996 s 98A) and instead gave tribunals a discretion to adjust the award by 25% if an employer had not complied with the Code of Practice for its industry on dismissal procedure (s 3). It also changes procedure for ACAS and employment tribunals. Essentially ACAS need only endeavour to reach a settlement, rather than having to reach a settlement and if someone does not turn up for a tribunal hearing both parties consent, then a judgment can be given by the tribunal without the expense of the hearing (ss 4-7).

=== Sections 8-14, minimum wage ===
Sections 8-12 change the NMWA 1998, which provides a statutory minimum wage for every worker in the UK. The minimum wage has three main methods for enforcement. First, it is hoped to be largely "self enforcing" because a well publicised minimum should be abided by everyone. Second, where workers are underpaid, they can bring claims to a tribunal by themselves. This individual enforcement is not perceived to be very effective, since workers will often not understand their exact rights, know how to bring a case to a tribunal or have the money to hire decent legal representation. This makes the third method of enforcement, by a government or administrative body, important for providing concrete adherence to the law. Just as consumers can complain to the Office of Fair Trading or pensioners can ask for help from the Pensions Regulator, workers can get help from the Inland Revenue. The changes in the EA 2008 were designed to strengthen this kind of enforcement.

Section 9 replaced ss 19-22F with ss 19-19H. It means there is now one notice that the Inland Revenue will give to employers who underpay, and a civil penalty of up to £5000 may follow. Section 10 says that now minimum wage enforcement officers can remove documents if they return them as soon as reasonably possible, rather than just looking at them and copying them when they inspect. Section 11 means that offences can be tried in a Crown or magistrates court. Section 13 clarifies that Cadet Force Adult Volunteers do not qualify for the NMW. Section 14 makes a wordy and insignificant amendment to the s 44 NMWA 1998, which says voluntary workers do not get paid a minimum wage, but can claim reasonable expenses for the purpose of their volunteer work. Section 8 also altered the formula for calculating arrears of the minimum wage.

=== Sections 15-18, employment agencies ===
The Employment Agency Standards Inspectorate is the small unit, a sub-division of the Department of Business, Innovation and Skills, which is charged with monitoring and enforcing standards for over 1.3m agency workers. These standards are found in the Employment Agencies Act 1973 and the Conduct of Employment Agencies and Businesses Regulations 2003 (SI 2003/3319), and include things like penalties for false advertising of jobs, prohibitions on strike breaking and extra sanctions for failing to give agency workers their statutory rights. Section 15 now makes offences triable in the Crown or magistrates' court. EASI has additional inspection powers, and if a Scottish partnership is the employer who fails to comply with the relevant standards then the partners will be personally liable. Section 18 requires that Inland Revenue officers enforcing the minimum wage and EASI inspectors work together.

=== Section 19, union member expulsion ===
Section 19 amends trade union membership law in line with the decision by the European Court of Human Rights in ASLEF v United Kingdom. This decided that members of the quasi-fascist British National Party could lawfully be expelled from membership of a trade union, and that it did not breach the right to freedom of association under Article 11 of the European Convention on Human Rights.

== Reception ==
The leader of the BNP, Nick Griffin, described the safeguards for unions to expel members due to their membership of a political party as "totalitarian".

Conservative MP, Jonathan Djanogly, described the legislation as returning the United Kingdom to the "dark days of the 1970s".

== See also ==
- Agricultural Wages Act 1948
- National Minimum Wage Act 1998
- Employment Relations Act 1999, statutory recognition procedure
- Employment Act 2002, flexible working
- Employment Relations Act 2004
- Gangmasters (Licensing) Act 2004
- Work and Families Act 2006, flexible working time for carers
- Employment Act 2008, strengthening enforcement
