= Buchan v Secretary of State for Trade and Industry =

Buchan v SS for Trade and Industry
- Full case name: Buchan and Ivey v Secretary of State for Trade and Industry
- Citation: [1997] IRLR 80

Keywords
- Insolvency protection

Buchan and Ivey v Secretary of State for Trade and Industry [1997] IRLR 80 is a UK insolvency law and labour law case, concerning the protection of employees' salaries on their employer's insolvency.

== Facts ==
Two directors held the company's shares. They made a claim against the National Insurance Fund, for statutory redundancy under the Employment Protection (Consolidation) Act 1978 (now the Employment Rights Act 1996 section 160). The Employment Tribunal held that because directors could block decisions at board level, including decisions over their dismissal, they were not employees.

== Judgment ==
Mummery J for the Employment Appeal Tribunal held the purpose of the legislation is not to help people whose businesses have failed. Therefore, he upheld the tribunal, that the directors could not claim reimbursement from National Insurance.

If the claimant is able, by reason of a beneficial interest in the shares of the company, to prevent his dismissal from his position in the company, he is outside the class of persons intended to be protected by the provisions of the 1978 Act and is not an employee within the meaning of that Act… A controlling shareholder can prevent the company from dismissing him from his position. It would be inconsistent with the purposes of the 1978 Act to extend protection to a person who cannot be dismissed from his position in a company without his agreement. This result conforms both to common sense and to the industrial or commercial realities of the situation… The decision does not mean that there will always be a contract of service in such circumstances. It all depends on the context. That was a case of a claim for compensation. The purpose of the insurance arrangements covering employees of the company was to provide compensation for a dependant, such as a widow, in the event of an accident to an employee. That purpose would be defeated if it were held that Mr Lee was not a worker under a contract of service. The liability to pay compensation could not be avoided by an attack on the validity of the contractual relations between Mr Lee and the company (which was not suggested to be a sham). His position as a controlling shareholder did not make it impossible in those circumstances for his wife to satisfy the conditions for the payment of compensation under the insurance arrangement.

== See also ==
- UK insolvency law
- UK labour law
