= Cairns v Visteon UK Ltd =

United Kingdom court case about labour law

- Court: Employment Appeal Tribunal
- Decided: 29 November 2006
- Citation: [2007] IRLR 175, [2007] ICR 616, [2006] UKEAT 0494_06_2911

Cairns v Visteon UK Ltd (2006) is a United Kingdom labour law case, regarding the scope of protection available to agency workers.*

== Facts ==
An assistant manager of 7 years with Visteon UK Ltd, Ms Cairns became an agency worker for the four most recent years through an agency named ‘MSX’. She was dismissed for allegedly falsifying her time sheets. The agency did investigations and cleared her, but Ms Cairns was not allowed back to work. The agency gave her pay in lieu of notice and redundancy. But she wanted compensation for unfair dismissal and brought a claim to the tribunal.

== Judgment ==
Judge Peter Clark held that Ms Cairns was not an "employee" under ERA 1996 s 230, and therefore could not bring an unfair dismissal claim. Doubting dicta in Dacas v Brook Street Bureau (UK) Ltd by Sedley LJ he insisted there was different policy behind ERA 1996 Part 10 to that of tort law, and there was "no good policy reason for extending that protection to a second parallel employer."
