= Employment (Allocation of Tips) Act 2023 =

UK employment legislation

Employment (Allocation of Tips) Act 2023 (Note: Section 15.)
- Act of Parliament
- Parliament of the United Kingdom
- Long title: An Act to ensure that tips, gratuities and service charges paid by customers are allocated to workers.
- Citation: 2023 c. 13
- Introduced by: Virginia Crosbie MP (Commons); Andrew Robathan (Lords)
- Territorial extent: England and Wales; Scotland; (Note: Section 13.)

Dates
- Royal assent: 2 May 2023
- Commencement: 1 October 2024 (Note: Section 14.)
Other legislation
Amends	Trade Union and Labour Relations (Consolidation) Act 1992; Employment Rights Act 1996; Employment Tribunals Act 1996; Employment Relations Act 1999

Status: Current legislation

History of passage through Parliament

Text of statute as originally enacted

Revised text of statute as amended

The Employment (Allocation of Tips) Act 2023 (c. 13) (sometimes known as the Tipping Act) is an act of the Parliament of the United Kingdom designed to ensure tips, gratuities and service charges are allocated to workers.

== History ==
Several employers such as Pizza Express and Giraffe were accused of abusing a voluntary code of conduct. Wahaca was criticised for taking deductions from certain employees' tips, although they had changed the policies by 2024.

== Provisions ==
Under the act, a statutory code of practice will provide guidance on implementation

Agency workers are also included by the legislation.

It is unclear if the legislation will require sharing tips with employees on maternity leave.

Employment law is devolved to the Northern Ireland Assembly, so the act does not apply to Northern Ireland.

== Reception ==
Nisha Katona, owner of Mowgli Street Foods, said the law was necessary because "young people depend on the law to protect them", but also said that some businesses which would be "casualties" because they were unprepared. Harriet Mansell, chef-owner of Lilac in Lyme Regis, acknowledged the need for transparency around tips, but also said that "some relief, independent restaurants like mine won't have the capacity to buffer this situation forever".

Unite indicated that the trade union had concerns about businesses imposing unelected individuals and senior managers as heads of tip-pooling committees. The fact that Northern Ireland would not have this legal protection, which was also in place in the Republic of Ireland was also criticised by Unite.
