= Labour Exchanges Act 1909 =

Act of the Parliament of the United Kingdom

Labour Exchanges Act 1909 (Note: Section 6.)
- Act of Parliament
- Parliament of the United Kingdom
- Long title: An Act to provide for the establishment of Labour Exchanges and for other purposes incidental thereto.
- Citation: 9 Edw. 7. c. 7
- Territorial extent: United Kingdom

Dates
- Royal assent: 20 September 1909
- Commencement: 20 September 1909 (Note: The Acts of Parliament (Commencement) Act 1793.)
- Repealed: England and Wales and Scotland: 13 July 1948; Northern Ireland: 21 December 1950
Other legislation
Repealed by	England and Wales and Scotland: Employment and Training Act 1948; Northern Ireland: Employment and Training Act (Northern Ireland) 1950

Status: Repealed

Text of statute as originally enacted

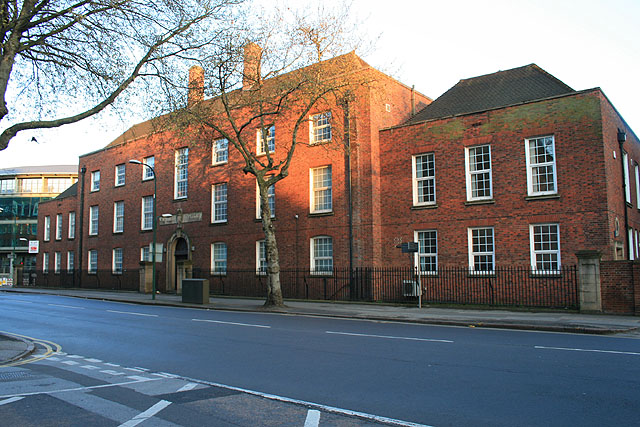
Labour Exchange in Nottingham

The Labour Exchanges Act 1909 (9 Edw. 7. c. 7) was an act of the Parliament of the United Kingdom which saw the state-funded creation of labour exchanges, also known as employment exchanges. The stated purpose was to help the unemployed find employment.

Prior to the creation of these government-funded labour exchanges, workers would have to search for jobs themselves; the first labour exchange was established by social reformer and employment campaigner Alsager Hay Hill in London in 1871.

The act also wanted to improve the mobility of the workforce, which until then had not been achieved. However, the exchanges were not very effective since only 25% of those listed on the labour exchange workforce found employment through them.

The law was opposed by some trade unions that feared their bargaining power would be reduced by the law and make it easier to recruit cheap labour from distant parts of the country.

== See also ==
- Liberal welfare reforms
- Labour Bureaux (London) Act 1902
- Employment Agencies Act 1973
- United Kingdom agency worker law
- United Kingdom labour law
