= Public Interest Disclosure Act =

Stock short title used for legislation

Public Interest Disclosure Act is a stock short title used in the United Kingdom and several Australian jurisdictions for legislation that is intended to protect whistleblowers:

== Australia ==
=== Federal ===
- The Public Interest Disclosure Act 2013 (Cth)

=== Australian Capital Territory ===
- The Public Interest Disclosure Act 2012 (ACT)

=== Queensland ===
- The Public Interest Disclosure Act 2010 (Qld)

=== Tasmania ===
- The Public Interest Disclosures Act 2002 (Tas)

=== Western Australia ===
- The Public Interest Disclose Act 2003 (WA)

=== Northern Territory ===
- The Public Interest Disclosure Act 2008 (NT)

== United Kingdom ==
- The Public Interest Disclosure Act 1998 (c. 23)
