= Job Today =

Mobile employment application

JOB TODAY
- Trade name: JOB TODAY SA
- Company type: Employment Networking Service
- Industry: Recruitment
- Founded: Barcelona, Spain
- Headquarters: Luxembourg City, Luxembourg
- Area served: United States, Spain, United Kingdom, Luxembourg
- Key people: Eugene Mizin (Chief Executive Officer); Polina Montano (Head of PR & Branding)
- Services: Mobile app, Recruitment, Employment agencies (UK only)
- Owners: Privately owned
- Number of employees: 50+
- Website: jobtoday.com

Job Today is a mobile employment application that operates in the United States, United Kingdom, and Spain. Their mobile applications have enabled interactions between over 100 million job seekers and over 400,000 businesses.

== Overview ==
Job Today is a mobile app that facilitates connections between individuals seeking employment and opportunities in several industries.

The company has onboarded 20,000 employers within the first eight months since its launch, and it has received two million job applications, resulting in 10,000 individuals securing employment.

== History ==
Job Today was launched in May 2015 in Barcelona and Madrid. In January 2016, the company announced an initiative to secure funding with the goal of expanding its operations to London. Accel Partners, Mangrove Capital Partners, and Felix Capital invested in Job Today after the company's expansion to London.

In October 2016, media entities, including Channel 4, RTL Germany, Atresmedia, and German Media Pool VC made strategic investments in the venture of Job Today. Job Today is experiencing rapid growth and is increasingly becoming the primary method for employers to fill job vacancies in sectors such as bartending, restaurants, hotels, retail, and small businesses. Job Today has managed more than 100 million applications for temporary positions within the hospitality and retail sectors since 2015.

== Awards ==
In December 2016, Job Today was named the winner of the social category in the Startup Europe Awards’ Luxembourg category.

In 2020, Job Today was recognized by the World Economic Forum as part of the 100 Most Promising Technology Pioneers of 2020.
