= Public Employment Service (Lithuania) =

- Užimtumo tarnyba

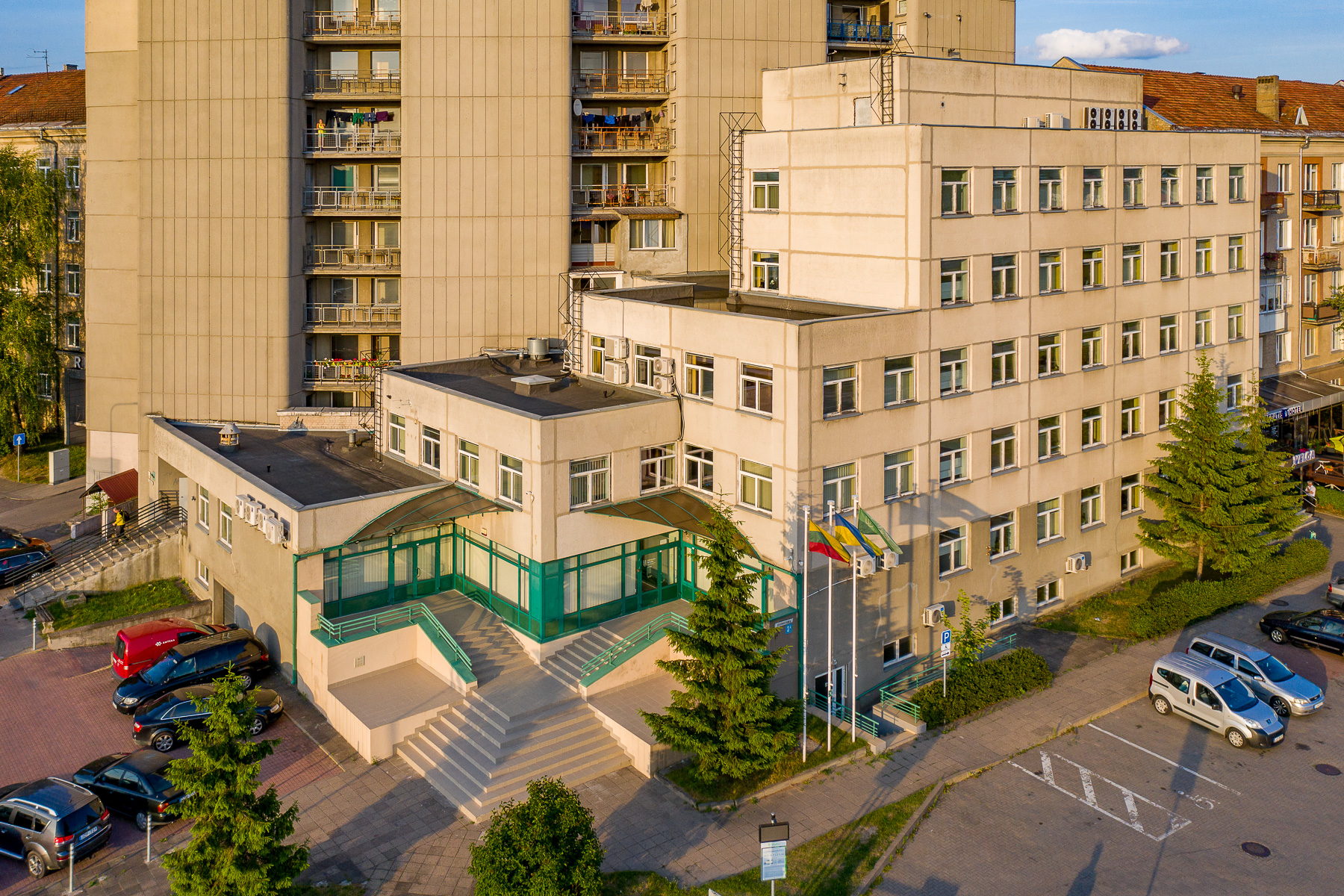
- Headquarters of the Public Employment Service in Vilnius

Executive Agency overview
- Formed: 1 March 1991; 35 years ago
- Jurisdiction: Lithuania
- Headquarters: Geležinio Vilko g. 3A, 03131 Vilnius
- Employees: 1 234
- Executive Agency executive: Inga Balnanosienė, Director
- Parent Ministry: Ministry of Social Security and Labour
- Website: uzt.lt

The Public Employment Service (Lithuanian: Užimtumo tarnyba), is a government agency in Lithuania organized under the Ministry of Social Security and Labour and serving as the public employment service.

The agency should help facilitate meetings and bring together employers with job seekers, especially those who are long-term unemployed and have particular difficulties in finding work. In addition to this, the agency should work to increase employment in the long term. This is primarily done by providing active support to companies in the recruitment process, facilitating meetings at the agency's premises and providing free searchable database. Until 2018, the agency was called the Labour Exchange (Lithuanian: Darbo birža), but it was then reformed and renamed.

== See also ==
- Ministry of Social Security and Labour (Lithuania)
- Jobcentre Plus
