= Pay in lieu of notice =

Concept in United Kingdom labour law

In United Kingdom labour law, payment in lieu of notice, or PILON, is a payment made to employees by an employer for a notice period that they have been told by the employer that they do not have to work. Employees dismissed for gross misconduct are not entitled to be paid their notice, unless stated otherwise within Terms and Conditions of their employment, but they are entitled to be paid for any statutory leave they have accumulated.

If a notice period such as one month is required for an employer to terminate a contract, a 'payment in lieu of notice' is immediate compensation at an amount equal to that an employee would have earned as salary or wages by working through the whole notice period: for example, one month's salary. A payment in lieu will include payment for holiday entitlements if the employee has them.

PILON can either be set out in the contract as an option for the employer, or it may simply be paid to cover any potential damages for breach of contract.

If there is a pay in lieu of notice clause in the employee's contract, the amount the employee will get will normally be set out there. If not, it is up to the employee to agree to an amount. Sometimes, employees may be willing to accept a small amount if it is in their interests to leave early. The amount to be paid will normally cover all salaries that would have been earned during the notice period.

That will normally cover basic pay and may include other things like commission and compensation for the loss of benefits, like personal use of a company car, phone, or medical insurance. The employer might instead decide to give the use of the benefits for the notice period. If employees think that the amount the employer is offering does not match what they would have earned, they can still consider making a breach of contract claim.

== See also ==
- Employment Rights Act 1996
