= Employment Act 1982 =

Act of the Parliament of the United Kingdom

Employment Act 1982 (Note: Section 22(1).)
- Act of Parliament
- Parliament of the United Kingdom
- Long title: An Act to provide for compensation out of public funds for certain past cases of dismissal for failure to conform to the requirements of a union membership agreement; to amend the law relating to workers, employers, trade unions and employers' associations; to make provision with respect to awards by industrial tribunals and awards by, and the procedure of, the Employment Appeal Tribunal; and for connected purposes.
- Citation: 1982 c. 46
- Territorial extent: England and Wales; Scotland; Northern Ireland (paragraph 13(4) of schedule 3); (Note: Section 22(5).)

Dates
- Royal assent: 28 October 1982
- Commencement: various (Note: Section 22(2).)
- Repealed: 22 July 2004
Other legislation
Amends	Employment Protection (Consolidation) Act 1978
Amended by	Companies Consolidation (Consequential Provisions) Act 1985; Trade Union Reform and Employment Rights Act 1993; Employment Tribunals Act 1996; Employment Rights Act 1996
Repealed by	Statute Law (Repeals) Act 2004

Status: Repealed

Text of statute as originally enacted

Revised text of statute as amended

The Employment Act 1982 (c. 46) was an act of the Parliament of the United Kingdom, mainly relating to trade unions. It increased compensation for those dismissed because of the closed shop and restricted the immunities enjoyed by trade unions.

== Background ==
The Conservative government had already passed the Employment Act 1980 which restricted the definition of lawful picketing and introduced ballots on the existence of the closed shop where it operated, needing 80% support of the workers to be maintained. The 1982 Act was a direct response to the consultations held on the basis of the green paper, Trade Union Immunities (Cmnd. 8128), published in January 1981.

The Secretary of State for Employment, Norman Tebbit, introduced the Bill in the House of Commons, saying:

We have not sought to transform the whole framework of industrial relations law...we have tried to provide specific remedies for real abuses, to promote effective protection where it has been shown to be necessary, and to redress the imbalance of bargaining power to which the legislation of the last Government had contributed so significantly.

== Provisions ==
The act's main provisions came into force on 1 December 1982. The statute:

1. Gave the government the power to issue compensation to some of those who were fired from their jobs due to the closed shop under the Labour government's legislation between 1974 and 1980. The people entitled to compensation are those whose sackings would have been unlawful if the clauses of the Employment Act 1980 had been law at the time.
2. Extensively enlarged the amount of money that can be awarded in compensation to those who are unlawfully fired for not belonging to a trade union in a closed shop. The compensation in these cases, under the act, are between £12,000 and £30,000 and can be lessened if a tribunal discovers that the employee contributed to his own dismissal.
3. Deemed it unlawful to sack a worker for not being a trade union member in a closed shop where the closed shop arrangements have not been approved in the previous five years by the necessary 80% of workers or 85% of workers voting in secret ballots. This clause came into force on 1 November 1984 to enable trade unions and employers enough time to organise ballots.
4. Outlawed "trade union labour only contracts". This makes it unlawful to deny to put companies in tendering lists or to award or offer contracts to them for reasons that they hire either trade union members or non-trade union members. Also, it removes the immunity from those who pressurise employers to act in this way or who organise industrial action to inhibit non-trade union companies from honouring their contracts.
5. Immunity from civil action for trade unions was brought into line with individual trade union officials, therefore making trade unions open to damages, depending on the size of the trade union, between £10,000 and £250,000 where they are responsible for unlawful industrial action.
6. Lawful trade disputes were restricted to those disputes between employers and their workers concerning working conditions, wages, etc. This new definition, therefore, excludes disputes between an employer and a trade union where (i) none of the workers are in a dispute, (ii) disputes between trade unions and workers, (iii) and disputes connected only to working conditions, wages, etc. and not about them either mainly or wholly. This definition also does not include disputes on foreign matters unless the jobs of the workers striking in Great Britain are likely to be affected by the outcome of the dispute. Immunity is removed from secondary action when taken by workers of one company to pressurise another company where there is no dispute between their workers and employers.
7. Empowered employers to fire striking workers and not face unfair dismissal claims if all workers involved in the strike at a particular workplace on a particular day are sacked. This allows employers to selectively fire striking workers, like those who continue to strike whilst other workers have returned to work.
8. Firms with more than 250 workers were required to include a statement in their annual report documenting the action they have pursued to develop arrangements for involving and consulting their workers. This clause came into effect on 1 January 1983.
9. Sections of the Trade Union and Labour Relations Act 1974 which the courts had interpreted as giving immunity to those who "sit-in" or "occupy" their workplaces were repealed.

== Response ==
A Trades Union Congress Special Conference was held on 5 April 1982, where trade union leaders voted to support an eight-point plan to oppose the act. A campaign pack entitled Fight Tebbit's Law was issued, and a travelling exhibition toured trade union conferences. The TUC encouraged trade unions to refuse to vote in closed shop ballots; to refuse public money for ballots under the Employment Act 1980; to gain the support of other trade unions in disputes; to forbid their members to sit on industrial tribunals concerning cases on the closed shop; and to help the TUC co-ordinate industrial action in support of any trade union facing legal action by an employer. A levy of ten pence per trade union member was raised to finance this campaign, which raised over one million pounds to 'Kill the Bill'. Trade union leaders voted overwhelmingly at the TUC Conference on 7 September 1982 for militant resistance—including industrial action—to the act.

The General Secretary of the TUC, Len Murray, said of the TUC campaign:

We cannot be sure that we can deliver...[Government propaganda] has even found credence among many of our members who value what their own unions do for them but are, paradoxically and illogically, at best apathetic and at worst sympathetic to the Government's purpose. We have a major job alerting trade unionists themselves to the real nature of the proposals.

The President of the National Union of Mineworkers, Arthur Scargill, said of the act: There is only one response that this movement can give, faced with this legislation. We should say "We will defy the law".

Chairman of the TUC Employment Committee, Bill Keys, said:

I will say publicly anywhere, if it is a bad law that doesn't nurture good, that doesn't look after the interests of ordinary people in this nation I will oppose the law and I will influence other people to oppose the law...if that means breaking the law I will do it.

The TUC President for 1982, Frank Chapple, disagreed:

Those who advocate that bad laws should not be obeyed—in circumstances where such "bad" laws are enacted by a democratically elected government—are putting at risk the entire conception of civilised society. That directly challenges democracy...the way to change bad laws is to change the government that has made them.

Judging by opinion polls, the act had the support of the general public and trade unionists. A MORI poll in November 1981 revealed that 79% of the public and 77% of trade unionists agreed that regular ballots should be held in existing closed shops; 70% of the public and 61% of trade unionists agreed that a company should be allowed to sue a trade union if it lost money in dispute which was unconnected to the company; and 76% of the public and 70% of trade unionists agreed that companies should be able to sue trade unions which broke agreements.

A Marplan poll showed that half of the trade unionists questioned opposed unlawful action in defiance of the act. Less than 50% of trade unionists in a MORI poll supported the TUC campaign, and a Gallup poll found that over 50% of the public and trade unionists believed that leaders of trade union who broke the law should be sent to prison.

Tebbit in his memoirs says of the act: "I have no doubt that Act was my greatest achievement in Government and I believe it has been one of the principal pillars on which the Thatcher economic reforms have been built."

== Subsequent developments ==
The whole act was repealed by section 1(1) of, and part 8 of schedule 1 to, the Statute Law (Repeals) Act 2004, which came into force on 22 July 2004.
