= British agency worker law =

United Kingdom Law of employment agencies

British agency worker law refers to the law which regulates people's work through employment agencies in the United Kingdom. Though statistics are disputed, there are currently between half a million and one and a half million agency workers in the UK, and probably over 17,000 agencies. As a result of judge made law and absence of statutory protection, agency workers have more flexible pay and working conditions than permanent staff covered under the Employment Rights Act 1996.

For most of the 20th century, employment agencies were quasi-legal entities in international law. The International Labour Organization in many Conventions called on member states to abolish them. However, the UK never signed up. The major piece of legislation which regulates agency practices is the Employment Agencies Act 1973, though it was slimmed considerably by the Deregulation and Contracting Out Act 1994. This abolished licences, so agencies operate without governmental oversight, except for a small inspectorate and occasional court cases. After the 2004 Morecambe Bay cockling disaster, Parliament enacted the Gangmasters (Licensing) Act 2004, requiring agencies (gangmasters) in the agricultural, shellfish and food packing sectors to be licensed.

In January 2010, the Government passed The Agency Workers Regulations 2010 (SI 2010/93) which require, at least, equal pay and working time rights when compared with what a direct worker would be paid. This is designed to implement the EU Agency Workers Directive, which is the first transnational legal measure to ensure agency workers are treated equally. The Directive was the culmination of initial resistance by the Government under Tony Blair, and a final surge of Parliamentary support for a Temporary and Agency Workers (Equal Treatment) Bill. The Regulations and the Directive are the third pillar of law, along with the Part-time Workers (Prevention of Less Favourable Treatment) Regulations 2000 and Fixed Term Employees (Prevention of Less Favourable Treatment) Regulations 2002 to regulate atypical workers.

== Employment agency regulation ==
The Employment Agencies Act 1973 regulates the conduct of the 17,000 odd agencies operating in the UK. It prohibits most agencies charging upfront fees, makes it an offence to put out misleading advertising for jobs which do not exist, sets standards for assessing an employee's experience, and more. It was introduced after similar (though stronger) legislation was passed in France and Germany regulating agencies (for Germany, see Arbeitnehmerüberlassungsgesetz). The 1973 Act was amended by the Conservative government through the Deregulation and Contracting Out Act 1994, ostensibly to increase efficiency. It abolished the system of agency licensing, so that agencies can operate freely, unless inspectors find violations and close them down.

Supporting the Act are The Conduct of Employment Agencies and Employment Businesses Regulations 2003. These regulations restrict agencies from,

- selling other services (r.5)
- sending workers to employers as strike breakers (r.7)
- sharing the agency worker's personal details (r.28)
- advertising jobs which do not exist (r.27)
- withholding pay from workers, regardless of whether they have timesheets
- charging any fees directly to a worker for their work
- require agencies to document the health and safety standards of employers they send workers to
- require agencies to give a written statement of the pay and hours they will have, and state their contractual status (see the common law section below)

In reality these requirements are not enforced, because there are minimal resources devoted to oversight. Regulation enforcement relies on individual workers bringing claims, and these claims are simply non-existent. There is no reported case of an agency worker claiming a breach of regulations. The watchdog, the Employment Agency Standards Inspectorate, has 15 inspectors and 4 call centre staff. This was increased by twelve inspectors after the Employment Act 2008 ss 15-18. In a £26 billion industry with 17,000 agencies, in 2004 the Inspectorate investigated 1,057 complaints, secured 8 convictions (solely in the entertainment industry, 2 agencies were banned for 10 years) and £5,735 in compensation for workers.

The Gangmasters (Licensing) Act 2004 covers some of the lowest-paid workers in a more comprehensive way. It was introduced in the wake of the 2004 Morecambe Bay cockling disaster. It requires all agencies (commonly known as "gangmasters") which provide labour in the agricultural, shell fishing and food packaging sectors to operate under a licence. The Gangmasters Licensing Authority issues these (currently there are 1,159 licences) and it oversees and enforces standards requiring employees to be treated fairly.

== Common law ==
The regulation of agency workers is affected by the interpretation by the courts of the word "employee" under s.230 of the Employment Rights Act 1996. If an individual is considered to be an "employee" then all the entitlements (such as a written statement of contract, reasonable notice before dismissal, time off for parenting, etc.) under the Employment Rights Act 1996 apply. But the courts have often held that agency workers fall outside of this definition, because they lack "mutuality of obligation" in their contracts.

The first important case was O'Kelly v Trusthouse Forte plc. Some waiters worked various dinner functions in the Grosvenor House Hotel. They tried to form a union. They were dismissed. They claimed that this was unfair, and to do that, they had to show they were "employees" within the meaning of the unfair dismissal legislation. The word "employee" had hitherto always been taken to mean someone who is obviously not in business on his own account (i.e. not "self employed"), but recognised as subordinate labour, economically dependent on the employer. However, Alexander Irvine QC argued that the waiters had no "mutuality of obligation" with the employer: they were not bound to accept work engagements when they were called up, and the employer was under no obligation to call them up. They could leave, or be fired, at will. Sir John Donaldson accepted this argument and deemed the waiters to fall outside of the scope of unfair dismissal legislation.

Not all judges took the same view. In Nethermere (St Neots) Ltd v Gardiner home-working ladies stitching flaps onto trousers were held to be employees within the meaning of the Act. The leading judge, Stephenson LJ, held that "mutuality of obligation" was nothing to do with the promise of future work, but simply the exchange of work for a wage, and control over one's job by the employer in the employment contract. Before the case reached the Court of Appeal, a young Tony Blair had been arguing the exact opposite in the Employment Appeals Tribunal, that O'Kelly's case should be followed. Agency workers were presumed to fall outside the scope of protective employment legislation. In 1997, when Tony Blair led New Labour to election victory, the approach to employment policy he brought was one of upholding labour market flexibility. The position of agency workers was reaffirmed when Derry Irvine was appointed Lord Chancellor, and he sat in on, and gave the leading judgement in, Carmichael v National Power plc. He reasserted his view of "mutuality of obligation". It is notable that the Constitutional Reform Act 2005 removed the power of the Lord Chancellor to decide on cases in this manner; it now being an incursion on the separation of powers within government.

Current authority could be said to still be ambivalent. On the one hand, the recent case of Dacas v Brook Street Bureau (UK) Ltd [2004] IRLR 358 held that an agency worker would be the "employee" of the end-employer. But then a slightly differently constituted Court of Appeal in James v Greenwich LBC [2008] EWCA Civ 35 has held that a contract of employment only exists with the agency itself. A feature of this ongoing debate is that, despite the fact that court cases for the last five years have always found an agency worker to be an "employee" of at least someone, generally speaking, neither end-employers nor employment agencies regard themselves as the employer who is bound by the Employment Rights Act 1996.

Under UK law, a contractor can be found caught by the tax initiative IR35, that is to say there is a virtual ("deemed") employment because that would be the case had the contract between worker and hirer been direct and the worker is then subject to extra taxes to compensate the government in that regard, yet he still has no apparent employment entitlements. This is partly because the Tax Commissioners and the Employment Tribunals, and Tax and Employment Law, respectively allow for different treatments.

== Securing equal pay and hours ==
The Temporary and Agency Workers (Prevention of Less Favourable Treatment) Bill, introduced by Paul Farrelly MP was talked out in 2007. Almost identical, the new (Equal Treatment) Bill has had real support and success in Parliament when introduced by Andrew Miller MP.

Even if agency workers had any of the entitlements under the Employment Rights Act 1996, there would still exist no requirement of equal pay for agency workers who do work of equal value compared to a permanent employer. An agency worker can be treated less favourably in his or her pay and conditions than someone doing exactly the same job, simply because they come through an agency. A proposed Temporary and Agency Workers (Equal Treatment) Bill sought to adjust this position, joining another ten pieces of employment discrimination law in the UK (on gender, race, disability, religion, sexuality, age, part-time work, fixed time work and trade union membership). After the Bill's second reading, the proposal was dropped and an older draft of a European Union Directive, the Temporary and Agency Workers Directive was revived, and passed by the European Parliament. This was possible for the first time in 2008 because the United Kingdom government dropped its opposition. In fact, the directive and the Bill are almost identical. It is understood that the law will be passed, but with a 12-week wait before agency workers will be eligible for equal pay and hours.

=== Scope ===
European directives have to be implemented by a UK law before they take effect in the country. This will mean that the UK government will either introduce an Act of Parliament or create a statutory instrument under the European Communities Act 1972 which puts the directive's required rules in place. In fact, the proposed 2008 Bill was based on the directive, and serves as a very good guide indeed as to what any implementation will look like. All the essentials are identical. The core of the new law is to oblige employers to treat agency workers and permanent staff equally in their contract terms, but only regarding

- Hours and holiday time
- Pay, including sick pay
- Time off for parenting (for women only)
- Discrimination law (though this is unnecessary because agency workers are already explicitly covered in existing laws)

The bill does not protect agency workers from being fired at the will of the employer. The courts are of two minds about whether agency workers should be considered "employees" (under s 230 ERA) and importantly whom they should be considered "employees" of. Confusion in the courts has encouraged more claims, and has prevented the enforcement of clear rights. Agency workers have almost none of the main entitlements under the Employment Rights Act 1996. None of this is covered in the directive. That means agency workers may potentially be left without the following rights.

- Right to reasonable notice before dismissal (s 86 ERA)
- Right to written statement of contract (s 1 ERA, these two rights form the bedrock of individual labour law, since they were the first national minimum standards to be introduced in the Contracts of Employment Act 1963)
- Right to request flexible working time (s 80F)
- Right to parental and paternity leave (in Part VIII)
- Right to redundancy payments (s 135)
- Compensation from the government for lost earnings when an employer goes insolvent (s 182)

In cl 4(1) the Bill created a right to have access to an Employment Tribunal under s 111 ERA 1996. This gives any person the right to bring an unfair dismissal claim against an "employer", and the bill expressly provided in cl 4(2) that for this purpose both the agency and the end-user are employers. However, in an action for unfair dismissal, the claimant would need to show that an employer had (unsurprisingly) in some way acted "unfairly" (s 98 ERA 1996). The way people demonstrate "unfairness" is to show that some pre-existing right has been breached. If an agency worker is not considered an "employee", then he will probably not be able to rely on the ERA 1996 rights which require it. So while the rights to equal treatment in the directive would be effective, agency workers would remain unprotected by almost every right in the ERA 1996.

=== Background ===
The Bill largely implements the European Commission's Agency Worker Directive 2008/104/EC which evolved from a Draft Temporary and Agency Worker Directive of 2002 (COD 2002/0149). The latter was delayed these six years due largely to the UK government's consistent opposition to substantial agency working regulations – it preferred labour market flexibility. Per newspaper reports, the UK got the backing of Germany to torpedo the draft Directive in return for the UK to help sink the Takeover Directive (Germany has comprehensive agency work regulation under its Arbeitnehmerüberlassungsgesetz and its Civil Code, esp §622, and the UK has strong Takeover Regulation, especially Rule 21 of the City Code.) The significant difference between the proposed Directive and the Bill is that governments, particularly the UK, managed to stipulate protections apply from 6 weeks of work in the Directive (equal treatment rights) per draft Art. 5(4). The first tabling of the Bill was undecided on this point, though more than one business consortium in the City of London called for one year of agency (or similar) work for a business to gain the protections.

The Directive included equal treatment only for pay, hours, parental rights and anti-discrimination (Art. 3(1)(d)). A significant omission therefore was any formulaic, fixed definition of minimum "reasonable notice before dismissal" enshrined in the UK by the ERA s.86 and defined by subsequent case law (common law).

Before the 2005 United Kingdom general election, the trade unions and the government made the Warwick Agreement (after its signing place, the University of Warwick). This included a promise of the government to support the European Directive. But by 2007, the government was yet to deliver, and Paul Farrelly MP introduced the Temporary and Agency Workers (Prevention of Less Favourable Treatment) Bill. It mirrored the Directive in all respects, save that there would be no 6-week qualifying period. In that period's climate, the Bill did not gain enough attention and was talked out of time. In the Court of Appeal case James v Greenwich LBC which further entrenched the subordinate position of agency workers, Mummery LJ pronounced it "doomed to failure for lack of support from the Government". But no sooner as that had been said, almost exactly the same Bill was reintroduced by Andrew Miller MP, with a small title change to emphasise "Equal Treatment" rather than "Prevention of Less Favourable Treatment". Identical in every way, save a tighter definition of employment agency and more provision for regulatory enforcement, it won the support of almost the whole Labour bench in the House of Commons. It was being heard in Committee each Wednesday morning as from 7 May. As of 21 May, the government said that it would table and move for Regulations. These passed (both Houses), received assent and became the Agency Workers Regulations 2010. They require a 12-week period of work before the rights to equal pay and time off begin.

== See also ==
- UK labour law
- Employment Agencies Act 1973
- Gangmasters (Licensing) Act 2004
- Employment Agency Standards Inspectorate
- Agency Workers Directive
