= Fixed-term Employees (Prevention of Less Favourable Treatment) Regulations 2002 =

United Kingdom Statutory Instrument

Fixed-term Employees (Prevention of Less Favourable Treatment) Regulations 2002 (Note: Section 1(1).)
- Statutory Instrument
- Parliament of the United Kingdom
- Citation: SI 2002/2034
- Territorial extent: United Kingdom

Dates
- Commencement: 1 October 2002
Other legislation
Amends	Social Security Contributions and Benefits Act 1992; Employment Tribunals Act 1996

Status: Amended

Text of statute as originally enacted

Text of the Fixed-term Employees (Prevention of Less Favourable Treatment) Regulations 2002 as in force today (including any amendments) within the United Kingdom, from legislation.gov.uk.

The Fixed-term Employees (Prevention of Less Favourable Treatment) Regulations 2002 (SI 2002/2034) are a UK statutory instrument aimed at protecting employees who have fixed-term contracts of employment. The regulations are in part intended to implement the European Union's Fixed-term Work Directive 1999 (99/70/EC) on fixed term workers.

They came into effect on 1 October 2002.

== Law ==
The principle of the directive on which the regulations are based is that a person with a fixed-term contract should not be treated less favourably than a comparable permanent co-worker.

== Implementation ==
It is argued that the regulations fail adequately to implement the requirements of the directive, because they do not protect the full range of "workers" that the directive refers to. In UK labour law, the definitions of "worker" and "employee" are not the same (see s.230 Employment Rights Act 1996), and the concept of a "worker" is considered broader, but the regulations are said to apply merely to the more limited category of "employees".

Also, r.2(2) provides that "an employee is not a comparable permanent employee if his employment has ceased". But in a decision by the European Court of Justice, Macarthy v. Smith [1980] ECR I-01275, it was held that a woman could compare herself for the purpose of Art. 119 of the EC Treaty (now Art. 141, the equal treatment provision on which the FTW Directive is based) with her predecessor in employment.

== See also ==
- UK labour law
- Adeneler v Ellinikos Organismos Galaktos [2006] IRLR 716 (C-212/04) on objective justification for use of fixed-term contracts disclosing a genuine need, and measures employed are proportionate to that aim, and twenty days is too little to break continuity
- Del Cerro Alonso v Osakidetza (2007) C-307/05, [2008] ICR 145

== Bibliography ==
- Aileen McColgan, 'The Fixed Term Employees (Prevention of Less Favourable Treatment) Regulations 2002: Fiddling While Rome Burns?' [2003] 32 ILJ 194
