= Race Relations Act 1976 =

Act of the Parliament of the United Kingdom

Race Relations Act 1976 (Note: Section 80(1).)
- Act of Parliament
- Parliament of the United Kingdom
- Long title: An Act to make fresh provision with respect to discrimination on racial grounds and relations between people of different racial groups; and to make in the Sex Discrimination Act 1975 amendments for bringing provisions in that Act relating to its administration and enforcement into conformity with the corresponding provisions in this Act.
- Citation: 1976 c. 74
- Territorial extent: England and Wales; Scotland; Northern Ireland (in part); (Note: Section 80(2).)

Dates
- Royal assent: 22 November 1976
- Commencement: 1 September 1977 (Note: Section 79.)
- Repealed: 1 October 2010

Other legislation
- Amends: Sex Discrimination Act 1975; House of Commons Disqualification Act 1975
- Amended by: Employment Protection (Consolidation) Act 1978; Armed Forces Act 1981; Industrial Training Act 1982; Public Order Act 1986; Trade Union and Labour Relations (Consolidation) Act 1992; Trade Union Reform and Employment Rights Act 1993; Employment Tribunals Act 1996; Employment Rights Act 1996; Education Act 1996; Petroleum Act 1998; Employment Relations Act 1999; Race Relations (Amendment) Act 2000; Statute Law (Repeals) Act 2004; Railways Act 2005; Immigration, Asylum and Nationality Act 2006National Lottery Act 2006; National Health Service (Consequential Provisions) Act 2006; UK Borders Act 2007
- Repealed by: Equality Act 2010
- Relates to: Sex Discrimination Act 1975

Status: Repealed

Text of statute as originally enacted

Revised text of statute as amended

The Race Relations Act 1976 (c. 74) was an act of the Parliament of the United Kingdom to prevent discrimination on the grounds of race. The scope of the legislation included discrimination on the grounds of race, colour, nationality, ethnic and national origin in the fields of employment, the provision of goods and services, education and public functions. The act also established the Commission for Racial Equality with a view to review the legislation, which was put in place to make sure the act's rules were followed.

The act incorporated the earlier Race Relations Act 1965 and Race Relations Act 1968 and was later amended by the Race Relations Amendment Act 2000, notably imposing a statutory duty on public bodies to promote racial equality and to demonstrate that procedures to prevent race discrimination were effective.

The act was repealed by the Equality Act 2010, which superseded and consolidated previous discrimination law in the UK.

== Employment ==
In the field of employment, section 7 of the act extended protection to "contract workers", that is, someone who works (or is prevented from working) for a person but is employed not by that person ("the principal") but by another person, who supplies the worker under a contract between the principal and the worker's employer. Typically this clause protects the rights of agency workers to be protected from racial discrimination. This provision was reviewed in a 2010 legal case, Leeds City Council v Woodhouse and Another, in which the court opted for "a broad reading" of section 7 and the type of employment relationship involved, "so as not to restrict the protection for contract workers". In this particular case it was confirmed that employees of an arms length housing management organisation were protected as contract workers even though the principal had no management control over how their employer dealt with its staff.

== Commission for Racial Equality ==
Section 43 established "a body of Commissioners named the Commission for Racial Equality", whose collective duties were:

1. to work towards the elimination of discrimination;
2. to promote equality of opportunity, and good relations, between persons of different racial groups generally; and
3. to keep under review the working of this act and, when they are so required by the Secretary of State or otherwise think it necessary, draw up and submit to the Secretary of State proposals for amending it.

== See also ==
- Equality and diversity (United Kingdom)
- Ethnic groups in the United Kingdom
- Ethnic relations
- UK employment discrimination law
