= James v Greenwich LBC =

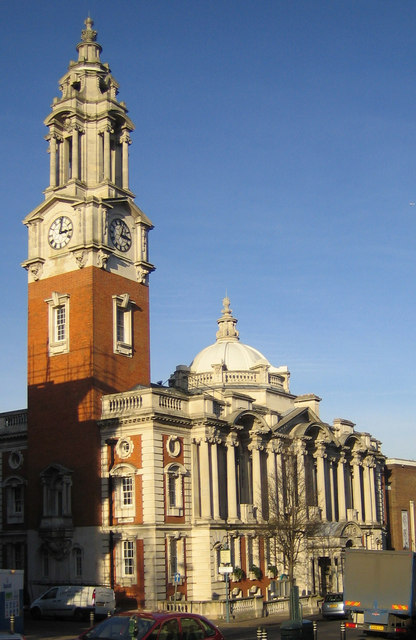
- Court: Court of Appeal of England and Wales
- Decided: 5 February 2008
- Citation: [2008] EWCA Civ 35

Court membership
- Judges sitting: Mummery LJ, Thomas LJ and Lloyd LJ

Keywords
- Implied contract

James v Greenwich London Borough Council [2008] EWCA Civ 35 is a UK labour law case, concerning implied contracts for workers who work through employment agencies. Its opinion was reversed by the Agency Workers Regulations 2010 and superseded by the more recent Supreme Court decision by Lord Clarke in Autoclenz Ltd v Belcher.

== Facts ==
Mrs James had worked for Greenwich Council (through a Brook Street plc subsidiary) for three years. She had begun with one agency, but then had changed to a different agency. She signed a new ‘temporary worker agreement’. The agencies paid her based on weekly timesheets. She was dismissed after she apparently took sick leave for two months without informing the agency or the council for her reasons. When Mrs James returned, she had been replaced. She claimed that she was unfairly dismissed.

The Employment Tribunal held that Mrs James did not have the requisite mutuality of obligation to support a contract existing between her and the local council, and a contract of service could not be implied. This meant she was not even an employee, and so that whether or not she was in fact fairly dismissed, under the ERA 1996 sections 94 and 230 she had no right to claim at all. Mrs James argued that this was a perverse finding, and the fact that she was an employee was the only one that matched the practical reality of the work relationship.

== Judgment ==
The Court of Appeal decision, read by Mummery LJ, dismissed Mrs James’ appeal and held the tribunal was entitled to find Mrs James was not the council’s employee, because there was neither an express nor an implied contract. The only express contractual relationship was with the employment agency, for both Mrs James and the council. To imply a contract a tribunal must ask whether it is necessary to do so, and the tribunal was not perverse in holding it was unnecessary. The council providing work, its payments to the employment agency and the performance of work by Mrs James were all explained by their respective express contracts with the agency.

== See also ==
- UK labour law
- Consistent Group Ltd v Kalwak [2008] EWCA Civ 430
