= Employment Tribunals Act 1996 =

Act of the Parliament of the United Kingdom

Employment Tribunals Act 1996 (Note: Section 1(2) of the Employment Rights (Dispute Resolution) Act 1998; and by section 48 of the Employment Tribunals Act 1996, as amended by section 1(2)(c) of the Employment Rights (Dispute Resolution) Act 1998.)
- Act of Parliament
- Parliament of the United Kingdom
- Long title: An Act to consolidate enactments relating to employment tribunals and the Employment Appeal Tribunal.
- Citation: 1996 c. 17
- Territorial extent: England and Wales; Scotland; (Note: Section 47.)

Dates
- Royal assent: 22 May 1996
- Commencement: 22 August 1996 (Note: Section 46.)
Other legislation
Amends	Judicial Pensions Act 1981; Social Security Administration Act 1992; Judicial Pensions and Retirement Act 1993; See § Repealed enactments
Repeals/revokes	See § Repealed enactments
Amended by	Arbitration Act 1996; Employment Rights (Dispute Resolution) Act 1998; Social Security Act 1998; National Minimum Wage Act 1998; Working Time Regulations 1998; Tax Credits Act 1999; Employment Relations Act 1999; Transnational Information and Consultation of Employees Regulations 1999; Tax Credits Act 2002; Employment Act 2002; Fixed-term Employees (Prevention of Less Favourable Treatment) Regulations 2002; Employment Equality (Religion or Belief) Regulations 2003; Employment Equality (Sexual Orientation) Regulations 2003; Disability Discrimination Act 1995 (Amendment) Regulations 2003; Employment Relations Act 2004; Fishing Vessels (Working Time: Sea-fishermen) Regulations 2004; Information and Consultation of Employees Regulations 2004; Constitutional Reform Act 2005; Equality Act 2006; Transfer of Undertakings (Protection of Employment) Regulations 2006; Occupational and Personal Pension Schemes (Consultation by Employers and Miscellaneous Amendment) Regulations 2006; Employment Equality (Age) Regulations 2006; European Cooperative Society (Involvement of Employees) Regulations 2006; Welfare Reform Act 2007; Tribunals, Courts and Enforcement Act 2007; Companies (Cross-Border Mergers) Regulations 2007; Employment Act 2008; Pensions Act 2008; Cross-border Railway Services (Working Time) Regulations 2008; Transfer of Tribunal Functions Order 2008; Apprenticeships, Skills, Children and Learning Act 2009; Welfare Reform Act 2009; Employment Tribunals Act 1996 (Tribunal Composition) Order 2009; European Public Limited-Liability Company (Employee Involvement) (Great Britain) Regulations 2009; Agency Workers Regulations 2010; Arbitration (Scotland) Act 2010 (Consequential Amendments) Order 2010; Employment Relations Act 1999 (Blacklists) Regulations 2010; Equality Act 2010 (Consequential Amendments, Saving and Supplementary Provisions) Order 2010; Employment Tribunals (Increase of Maximum Deposit) Order 2012; Employment Tribunals Act 1996 (Tribunal Composition) Order 2012; Tribunals, Courts and Enforcement Act 2007 (Consequential Amendments) Order 2012; Crime and Courts Act 2013; Enterprise and Regulatory Reform Act 2013; Universal Credit (Consequential, Supplementary, Incidental and Miscellaneous Provisions) Regulations 2013; Merchant Shipping (Maritime Labour Convention) (Hours of Work) (Amendment) Regulations 2014; Employment Tribunals Act 1996 (Application of Conciliation Provisions) Order 2014; Criminal Justice and Courts Act 2015; Small Business, Enterprise and Employment Act 2015; Employment Tribunals Act 1996 (Application of Conciliation Provisions) Order 2015; Posted Workers (Enforcement of Employment Rights) Regulations 2016; Courts and Tribunals (Judiciary and Functions of Staff) Act 2018; Merchant Shipping (Maritime Labour Convention) (Hours of Work) Regulations 2018; Employment Rights Act 1996 (NHS Recruitment – Protected Disclosure) Regulations 2018; Companies, Limited Liability Partnerships and Partnerships (Amendment etc.) (EU Exit) Regulations 2019; Agency Workers (Amendment) Regulations 2019; Employment Rights (Miscellaneous Amendments) Regulations 2019; Public Service Pensions and Judicial Offices Act 2022; Judicial Review and Courts Act 2022; Employment Tribunals Act 1996 (Application of Conciliation Provisions) Order 2022; Employment (Allocation of Tips) Act 2023; Workers (Predictable Terms and Conditions) Act 2023; Employment Rights Act 2025
Relates to	Employment Rights Act 1996

Status: Amended

Text of statute as originally enacted

Text of the Employment Tribunals Act 1996 as in force today (including any amendments) within the United Kingdom, from legislation.gov.uk.

The Employment Tribunals Act 1996 (c. 17), formerly called the Industrial Tribunals Act 1996, (Note: Section 48) is an act of the Parliament of the United Kingdom, relating to UK labour law, that establishes the Employment Tribunals and Employment Appeal Tribunal, and sets their jurisdiction.

== Provisions ==
Part I concerns Employment Tribunals. Section 1 allows the Secretary of State to make provisions for Employment Tribunals. Sections 2 to 3 concern the Tribunal's jurisdiction. Sections 4 to 5 concern Membership of the tribunals and pay. Sections 6 to 15 elaborate on procedure through hearings, practice directions, mediation, pre-hearing reviews, confidential information, publicity and costs, and enforcement. Sections 16 and 17 concern recoupment of social security benefits. Sections 18 to 19A deal with conciliation procedures.

Part II concerns the Employment Appeal Tribunal. Sections 20 to 37 concern the jurisdiction, membership, procedure, decisions and further appeals.

Part III contains supplementary provisions, in sections 38 to 42, while final provisions are in sections 43 to 48.

=== Repealed enactments ===
Section 242 of the act repealed 60 enactments and revoked 7 instruments, listed in parts I and II of schedule 3 to the act, respectively.

Part I
Citation	Short title	Extent of repeal
1963 c. 2	Betting, Gaming and Lotteries Act 1963	Section 31A. In Schedule 5A, paragraphs 1 to 20 and 22.
1969 c. 48	Post Office Act 1969	In Schedule 9, paragraph 33.
1971 c. 11	Atomic Energy Authority Act 1971	Section 10(1).
1976 c. 74	Race Relations Act 1976	In Schedule 2, in paragraph 11, in sub-paragraph (1), the words "and the following" and sub-paragraphs (2), (3) and (5) and paragraphs 12 and 13.
1978 c. 44	Employment Protection (Consolidation) Act 1978	Sections 1 to 6. Sections 8 to 22C. Sections 29 to 47. Sections 49 to 57A. Sections 59 to 61. Sections 63 to 93. Section 96. Sections 98 to 102. Sections 106 to 108. Sections 110 to 112. Sections 114 to 120. Section 122. Sections 124 to 127. Section 129. Section 137. Section 138(1) to (6), (7)(a) to (d) and (f) and (8). Section 139(1)(a) to (c) and (e) and (2) to (9). Section 139A(1), (2), (3)(b) and (4) to (6). Sections 140 to 142. Section 144. Section 146. Section 146A. Sections 148 to 160. Schedules 1 to 4. Schedule 7. Schedule 8. Schedules 12 to 17.
1980 c. 20	Education Act 1980	In Schedule 1, paragraph 30.
1980 c. 42	Employment Act 1980	Section 6. Section 8(2). Section 9. Sections 12 to 14. Section 20. Section 21. In Schedule 1, paragraphs 1, 8, 11, 13, 20, 22, 23, 25, 31 and 33. Schedule 2.
1980 c. 43	Magistrates' Courts Act 1980	In Schedule 7, paragraph 175.
1980 c. 48	Finance Act 1980	In Schedule 19, paragraph 5(4).
1981 c. 64	New Towns Act 1981	Section 54(6).
1982 c. 16	Civil Aviation Act 1982	In Schedule 3, paragraphs 6 and 8(1).
1982 c. 23	Oil and Gas (Enterprise) Act 1982	In Schedule 3, paragraph 40.
1982 c. 24	Social Security and Housing Benefits Act 1982	In Schedule 2, paragraph 13.
1982 c. 46	Employment Act 1982	Section 20. Section 21(1) and (3). In Schedule 2, paragraphs 1 to 5, 6(2), (4) and (5), 7(1) and (2) and 9. In Schedule 3, in Part I, paragraphs 1, 2, 4 and 6 and, in Part II, paragraphs 15, 21 to 23, 25, 26, 27(1) and 28 to 30. Schedule 4.
1983 c. 23	Water Act 1983	In Schedule 2, in Part I, paragraph 8(1)(b).
1983 c. 41	Health and Social Services and Social Security Adjudications Act 1983	In Schedule 9, in Part I, paragraph 25.
1984 c. 36	Mental Health (Scotland) Act 1984	Section 126(2)(c).
1985 c. 17	Reserve Forces (Safeguard of Employment) Act 1985	In Schedule 4, paragraph 6.
1985 c. 51	Local Government Act 1985	In section 53, subsection (5) and, in subsection (6), the words "Except as provided in subsection (5) above" and "a redundancy payment under Part VI of the said Act of 1978 or to". Section 55(3) to (5). Section 59(1) to (3).
1985 c. 65	Insolvency Act 1985	Section 218. In Schedule 8, paragraph 31(1), (2) and (5).
1985 c. 66	Bankruptcy (Scotland) Act 1985	In Schedule 7, in Part I, paragraph 14(1), (2) and (4).
1985 c. 71	Housing (Consequential Provisions) Act 1985	In Schedule 4, paragraph 7(2)(a).
1986 c. 45	Insolvency Act 1986	In Schedule 14, the entries relating to the Employment Protection (Consolidation) Act 1978.
1986 c. 47	Legal Aid (Scotland) Act 1986	In Schedule 1, in paragraph 10(2)(a), the words "Part VI of the Employment Protection (Consolidation) Act 1978 shall not apply to him and".
1986 c. 48	Wages Act 1986	Sections 1 to 11. Sections 28 to 33. Schedule 1. In Schedule 4, paragraph 4. Schedule 5. In Schedule 6, paragraph 10.
1986 c. 50	Social Security Act 1986	In Schedule 10, in Part IV, paragraphs 76 and 81.
1986 c. 59	Sex Discrimination Act 1986	Section 3.
1987 c. 26	Housing (Scotland) Act 1987	In Schedule 22, in Part II, paragraph 10(2)(a).
1988 c. 1	Income and Corporation Taxes Act 1988	Section 150(b). In section 579, subsection (2)(a), in subsections (2)(b) and (3)(b) and in subsection (4)(b) as it has effect otherwise than for the purposes of corporation tax, the word "net" and, in subsection (5)(b), the words ", and the full amount of the rebate". Section 580(2).
1988 c. 4	Norfolk and Suffolk Broads Act 1988	In Schedule 6, paragraph 19.
1988 c. 20	Dartford-Thurrock Crossing Act 1988	In Schedule 5, in Part I, paragraph 2(2).
1988 c. 34	Legal Aid Act 1988	In Schedule 7, in paragraph 7(3), the words "Part VI of the Employment Protection (Consolidation) Act 1978 shall not apply to him and".
1988 c. 40	Education Reform Act 1988	In section 173, subsection (6) and, in subsection (7), the words "Except as provided in subsection (6) above" and "a redundancy payment under Part VI of the Act of 1978 mentioned above or to". Section 175(3) to (5). Section 178(1) and (2). In Schedule 12, in Part I, paragraph 23 and, in Part III, paragraph 80.
1988 c. 43	Housing (Scotland) Act 1988	In Schedule 1, in paragraph 12(2), the words "Part VI of the Employment Protection (Consolidation) Act 1978 shall not apply to him and".
1988 c. 50	Housing Act 1988	In Schedule 5, in paragraph 10(2), the words "Part VI of the Employment Protection (Consolidation) Act 1978 shall not apply to him and".
1989 c. 13	Dock Work Act 1989	Section 6(2). Section 7(4). In Schedule 2, paragraphs 6 and 7.
1989 c. 15	Water Act 1989	In section 194(7)(d), the words "and the Employment Protection (Consolidation) Act 1978". In Schedule 25, paragraph 56.
1989 c. 29	Electricity Act 1989	Section 56(2).
1989 c. 38	Employment Act 1989	Sections 15 to 18. Section 19(1). In section 27(1), the words "and 16 to 19". In section 29(1), the definition of "the 1978 Act". Section 30(3)(f). In Schedule 6, paragraphs 21 to 25. In Schedule 9, paragraphs 3 to 5.
1989 c. 39	Self-Governing Schools etc. (Scotland) Act 1989	In Schedule 10, paragraph 7.
1990 c. 19	National Health Service and Community Care Act 1990	In Schedule 9, paragraph 20.
1990 c. 35	Enterprise and New Towns (Scotland) Act 1990	In Schedule 1, in paragraph 17(2), the words "Part VI of the said Act of 1978 shall not apply to him and".
1990 c. 38	Employment Act 1990	Section 13(1), (2) and (4). Section 16. In section 17, subsection (1) and, in subsection (2), the words "Apart from this section,". In Schedule 2, paragraph 1(1) and (3) to (6). Schedule 3.
1990 c. 43	Environmental Protection Act 1990	In Schedule 10, in paragraph 16, the words "Part VI of the Employment Protection (Consolidation) Act 1978 shall not apply to him and".
1991 c. 28	Natural Heritage (Scotland) Act 1991	In Schedule 4, in paragraph 5, the words "Part VI of the Employment Protection (Consolidation) Act 1978 shall not apply to him and".
1992 c. 6	Social Security (Consequential Provisions) Act 1992	In Schedule 2, paragraphs 51 and 74.
1992 c. 13	Further and Higher Education Act 1992	In Schedule 8, in Part II, paragraph 89.
1992 c. 37	Further and Higher Education (Scotland) Act 1992	In Schedule 9, paragraph 6.
1992 c. 52	Trade Union and Labour Relations (Consolidation) Act 1992	In Schedule 2, paragraphs 11 to 14, 16 to 18, 21 to 23, 29(2), 30, 33 and 34(1) and (2).
1993 c. 19	Trade Union Reform and Employment Rights Act 1993	Sections 23 to 26. Sections 28 to 31. In section 39, subsection (1) and, in subsection (2), the words ", the Wages Act 1986". Section 54(2)(a) to (e). Schedules 2 to 5. In Schedule 6, paragraph 3. In Schedule 7, paragraphs 2 to 5, 11, 13, 14 and 16. In Schedule 8, paragraphs 10 to 18, 21 to 27, 31, 32, 35 to 37 and 67. In Schedule 9, paragraph 3.
1993 c. 48	Pension Schemes Act 1993	Section 164(6). In Schedule 8, paragraphs 11(1) and 45(a).
1994 c. 10	Race Relations (Remedies) Act 1994	Section 1(2).
1994 c. 18	Social Security (Incapacity for Work) Act 1994	In Schedule 1, in Part II, paragraph 54.
1994 c. 20	Sunday Trading Act 1994	In Schedule 4, paragraphs 1 to 20 and 22.
1994 c. 40	Deregulation and Contracting Out Act 1994	Section 20(3) and (5). Section 36(1). Schedule 8.
1995 c. 17	Health Authorities Act 1995	In Schedule 1, paragraph 103.
1995 c. 25	Environment Act 1995	In Schedule 7, in paragraph 11(3), the words from the beginning to "but".
1995 c. 26	Pensions Act 1995	Sections 42 to 46. In Schedule 3, paragraphs 1 to 7 and 10.
1995 c. 50	Disability Discrimination Act 1995	In Schedule 6, paragraph 3.
1996 c. 14	Reserve Forces Act 1996	In Schedule 10, paragraph 17.

Part II
Citation	Title	Extent of revocation
SI 1983/624	Insolvency of Employer (Excluded Classes) Regulations 1983	The whole instrument.
SI 1993/2798	Sex Discrimination and Equal Pay (Remedies) Regulations 1993	In the Schedule, in paragraph 1, the entry relating to the Employment Protection (Consolidation) Act 1978 and paragraph 2.
SI 1995/31	Employment Protection (Part-time Employees) Regulations 1995	The whole instrument.
SI 1995/278	Insolvency of Employer (Excluded Classes) Regulations 1995	The whole instrument.
SI 1995/2587	Collective Redundancies and Transfer of Undertakings (Protection of Employment) (Amendment) Regulations 1995	Regulation 12(1), (2) and (4). Regulation 13(1), (2) and (4) to (6). Regulation 14.
SI 1996/593	Environment Act 1995 (Consequential Amendments) Regulations 1996	In Schedule 1, paragraph 19.
SI 1996/973	Environment Act 1995 (Consequential and Transitional Provisions) (Scotland) Regulations 1996	In the Schedule, paragraph 4.

== See also ==
- UK labour law
