= Employment Rights (Dispute Resolution) Act 1998 =

Act of the Parliament of the United Kingdom

Employment Rights (Dispute Resolution) Act 1998 (Note: Section 18.)
- Act of Parliament
- Parliament of the United Kingdom
- Long title: An Act to rename industrial tribunals and amend the law relating to those tribunals; to amend the law relating to dismissal procedures agreements and other alternative methods of resolving disputes about employment rights; to provide for the adjustment of awards of compensation for unfair dismissal in cases where no use is made of internal procedures for appealing against dismissal; to make provision about cases involving both unfair dismissal and disability discrimination; and for connected purposes.
- Citation: 1998 c. 8
- Territorial extent: England and Wales; Scotland; Northern Ireland (in part); (Note: Section 16.)

Dates
- Royal assent: 8 April 1998
- Commencement: Various (Note: Section 17.)
Other legislation
Amends	Courts Act 1971; House of Commons Disqualification Act 1975; Judicial Pensions Act 1981; National Heritage Act 1983; National Heritage (Scotland) Act 1985; Legal Aid (Scotland) Act 1986; Courts and Legal Services Act 1990; Trade Union and Labour Relations (Consolidation) Act 1992; Judicial Pensions and Retirement Act 1993; Trade Union Reform and Employment Rights Act 1993; Employment Tribunals Act 1996; Employment Rights Act 1996; Scotland Act 1998
Amended by	Employment Relations Act 1999; Statute Law (Repeals) Act 2004

Status: Amended

Text of statute as originally enacted

Revised text of statute as amended

The Employment Rights (Dispute Resolution) Act 1998 (c. 8) is an act of the Parliament of the United Kingdom concerning dispute resolution in British labour law.

== Purpose ==
The goal of the legislation was to allow disputes to be resolved speedily, efficiently and economically.

== Provisions ==
The 1998 act empowered the Advisory, Conciliation and Arbitration Service (ACAS) to create arbitration hearings as an alternative dispute resolution mechanism to the employment tribunals. The scheme is known as the Acas Arbitration Scheme.

The act renamed industrial tribunals to employment tribunals.

== In practice ==
In 2003 to 2004 the number of tribunal claims was around 50,000 each year. The number of disputes attracted to arbitration under the 1998 act scheme was seven.

== See also ==
- UK labour law
