= Trade Union Reform and Employment Rights Act 1993 =

Act of the Parliament of the United Kingdom

Trade Union Reform and Employment Rights Act 1993 (Note: Section 55.)
- Act of Parliament
- Parliament of the United Kingdom
- Long title: An Act to make further reforms of the law relating to trade unions and industrial relations; to make amendments of the law relating to employment rights and to abolish the right to statutory minimum remuneration; to amend the law relating to the constitution and jurisdiction of industrial tribunals and the Employment Appeal Tribunal; to amend section 56A of the Sex Discrimination Act 1975; to provide for the Secretary of State to have functions of securing the provision of careers services; to make further provision about employment and training functions of Scottish Enterprise and of Highlands and Islands Enterprise; and for connected purposes.
- Citation: 1993 c. 19
- Territorial extent: United Kingdom (Note: Section 54.)

Dates
- Royal assent: 1 July 1993
- Commencement: various (Note: Section 52.)

Other legislation
- Amends: Factories Act 1961; Contracts of Employment and Redundancy Payments Act (Northern Ireland) 1965; Parliamentary Commissioner Act 1967; Transport Act 1968; Finance Act 1969; Equal Pay Act 1970; Chronically Sick and Disabled Persons Act 1970; Employment Agencies Act 1973; Employment and Training Act 1973; House of Commons Disqualification Act 1975; Northern Ireland Assembly Disqualification Act 1975; Sex Discrimination Act 1975; Race Relations Act 1976; Industrial Relations (Northern Ireland) Order 1976; Employment Protection (Consolidation) Act 1978; Nurses, Midwives and Health Visitors Act 1979; Employment Act 1980; Education (Scotland) Act 1980; Transfer of Undertakings (Protection of Employment) Regulations 1981; Agricultural Training Board Act 1982; Industrial Training Act 1982; Employment Act 1982; Wages Act 1986; Social Security Act 1986; Income and Corporation Taxes Act 1988; Employment Act 1988; Legal Aid Act 1988; Dock Work Act 1989; Social Security Act 1989; Employment Act 1989; Enterprise and New Towns (Scotland) Act 1990; Trade Union and Labour Relations (Consolidation) Act 1992
- Repeals/revokes: Offshore Safety (Protection Against Victimisation) Act 1992
- Amended by: Deregulation and Contracting Out Act 1994; Employment Protection (Part-time Employees) Regulations 1995; Industrial Tribunals Act 1996; Employment Rights Act 1996; Employment Rights (Dispute Resolution) Act 1998; Access to Justice Act 1999; Employment Relations Act 1999; Statute Law (Repeals) Act 2004; Equality Act 2006; Transfer of Undertakings (Protection of Employment) Regulations 2006; Equality Act 2010 (Consequential Amendments, Saving and Supplementary Provisions) Order 2010; Trade Union Act 2016; Employment Rights Act 2025

Status: Amended

Text of statute as originally enacted

Revised text of statute as amended

Text of the Trade Union Reform and Employment Rights Act 1993 as in force today (including any amendments) within the United Kingdom, from legislation.gov.uk.

The Trade Union Reform and Employment Rights Act 1993 (c. 19) is an act of the Parliament of the United Kingdom. The act is a UK labour law that abolished the minimum wages set by sectors through 27 remaining wage councils. It also recast parts of the Employment Protection (Consolidation) Act 1978 and altered the Trade Union and Labour Relations (Consolidation) Act 1992. Most parts were then transferred to the Employment Rights Act 1996.

== Overview ==
- ss 43 and 44 narrowed the powers of ACAS, removing power to intervene in collective bargaining by giving advice, and stressing its new "advisory" role, making its services not free of charge, stipulating that ACAS's chairman need not be full-time, and introducing "compromise agreements"

== See also ==
- UK labour law
