= Employment Agencies Act 1973 =

Act of the Parliament of the United Kingdom

Employment Agencies Act 1973 (Note: Section 14(1).)
- Act of Parliament
- Parliament of the United Kingdom
- Long title: An Act to regulate employment agencies and businesses; and for connected purposes.
- Citation: 1973 c. 35
- Introduced by: Kenneth Lewis (Commons)
- Territorial extent: England and Wales; Scotland; (Note: Section 14(5).)

Dates
- Royal assent: 18 July 1973
- Commencement: 30 June 1978; 1 July 1976; 1 November 1976; (Note: Section 14(4). The Employment Agencies Act 1973 (Commencement) Order 1976 (SI 1976/709).)
Other legislation
Amended by	Trade Union Reform and Employment Rights Act 1993; Employment Relations Act 1999; Policing and Crime Act 2017; Employment Rights Act 2025

Status: Amended

Text of statute as originally enacted

Text of the Employment Agencies Act 1973 as in force today (including any amendments) within the United Kingdom, from legislation.gov.uk.

The Employment Agencies Act 1973 (c. 35) is an act of the Parliament of the United Kingdom and part of a wider body of UK agency worker law. It regulates the conduct of employment agencies which recruit and manage temporary and permanent labour. It applies to approximately 17,000 employment agencies operating in the UK. It was introduced by a private member's bill by Kenneth Lewis, member of parliament for Rutland and Stamford.

== History ==
=== Introduction ===
In its original form, the act provided for a system of licensing. Each business that wanted to set up an employment agency was required to have a license which would be denied or revoked if set standards (e.g. no registration fees for workers; no advertising of non-existent jobs) were not followed. The act came at the same time as similar reforms around Europe, for instance, the German Arbeitnehmerüberlassungsgesetz (Employee Hiring Law of 1972).

Regulations prescribing further detailed rules were implemented in 1976.

=== Amendments ===
In 1994, the Conservative government, in its deregulation drive, abolished the system of licenses with the Deregulation and Contracting Out Act 1994. Instead, enforcement of regulations would rely on the Employment Agency Standards Inspectorate.

In 1999 the Employment Relations Act 1999 section 31 with schedule 7 empowering the Secretary of State to make further regulations affecting agencies and their workers.

In 2003 new regulations were introduced, replacing those from 1976. The Conduct of Employment Agencies and Employment Businesses Regulations 2003 prohibit the charging of fees, except in a small number of mostly arts related professions (e.g. modelling). The additions made in 2003 were few, primarily relating to confidentiality of information and candidate qualification checks.

== See also ==
- UK labour law
- UK agency worker law
- Gangmasters (Licensing) Act 2004
- Temporary and Agency Workers (Equal Treatment) Bill

Historical

- Robert Owen
- Labour Bureau (London) Act 1902
- Labour Exchanges Act 1909
- Adams v. Tanner, 244 US 590 (1917), a US Supreme Court case where a conservative bench, with liberal judges dissenting, decided that a Washington state law prohibiting employment agencies was "unconstitutional".
- Unemployment Convention, 1919, after the ILO's first Recommendation, this called for public employment agencies to be established with a monopoly
- Fee-Charging Employment Agencies Convention, 1933 (shelved)
- Fee-Charging Employment Agencies Convention (Revised), 1949
- Private Employment Agencies Convention, 1997 (n.b. the UK never signed up to any of these ILO conventions)
