= Employment Relations Act 1999 =

Act of the Parliament of the United Kingdom

Employment Relations Act 1999 (Note: Section 47.)
- Act of Parliament
- Parliament of the United Kingdom
- Long title: An Act to amend the law relating to employment, to trade unions and to employment agencies and businesses.
- Citation: 1999 c. 26
- Introduced by: Stephen Byers, Secretary of State for Trade and Industry (Commons)
- Territorial extent: United Kingdom (Note: Section 46.)

Dates
- Royal assent: 27 July 1999
- Commencement: Various (Note: Section 45.)
Other legislation
Amends	Parliamentary Commissioner Act 1967; Employment Agencies Act 1973; House of Commons Disqualification Act 1975; Northern Ireland Assembly Disqualification Act 1975; Race Relations Act 1976; Trade Union and Labour Relations (Consolidation) Act 1992; Trade Union Reform and Employment Rights Act 1993; Disability Discrimination Act 1995; Employment Tribunals Act 1996; Employment Rights Act 1996; Employment Rights (Dispute Resolution) Act 1998; Public Interest Disclosure Act 1998; School Standards and Framework Act 1998; National Minimum Wage Act 1998; Tax Credits Act 1999
Repeals/revokes	Maternity (Compulsory Leave) Regulations 1994
Amended by	Statute Law (Repeals) Act 2004; Employment (Allocation of Tips) Act 2023; Employment Rights Act 2025

Status: Amended

Text of statute as originally enacted

Revised text of statute as amended

The Employment Relations Act 1999 (c. 26) is an act of the Parliament of the United Kingdom. The act implemented measures proposed in the Fairness at Work white paper, so the act was sometimes known as the "Fairness at Work Bill".

It made significant amendments in UK labour law to the Trade Union and Labour Relations (Consolidation) Act 1992.

== Provisions ==
=== Trade unions ===
Sections 1 to 6 concern changes implementing a new statutory procedure for employers to recognise and collectively bargain with a trade union, in any business with over 20 employees. Section 1 and Schedule 1 achieves this by amending the Trade Union and Labour Relations (Consolidation) Act 1992 and inserting a new section 70A and Schedule A1, which sets out the statutory recognition procedure.

The act established a right to collective organising.

Section 2 and Schedule 2 amended TULRCA 1992 to require that union members are not subject to any detriment short of dismissal for attempts to organise.

Section 3 allows the Secretary of State to make regulations prohibiting any blacklisting of union members.

Sections 4 and Schedule 3 amends the provisions in TULRCA 1992 relating to ballots before industrial action. Section 5 implements TULRCA 1992 sections 70B and 70C, which enhances the rights employees have to workplace training. Section 6 ensures that union members have a right to claim for unfair dismissal connected with the statutory recognition procedure.

=== Leave for family and domestic reasons ===
The act gives three months unpaid parental leave for mothers and fathers. The act gives individuals the right to time off for caring for a sick relative.

=== Disciplinary and grievance hearings ===
Section 10 creates a right for employees to be accompanied to disciplinary or grievance meetings by a companion of their choice provided that the chosen companion is a member of one of the following categories:

- a paid official of a trade union;
- an unpaid official of a trade union who is certified as competent to act as a companion; or
- another of the employer's workers.

Where an employer refuses to allow the employee to be accompanied in this way the employee may present a claim in an Employment Tribunal and be entitled to limited financial compensation.

In certain circumstances a failure to permit accompaniment may also amount to a breach of the implied contractual term that an employer will not without reasonable or proper cause conduct itself in such a way that is calculated or likely to destroy or seriously damage the relationship of trust and confidence that exists between an employer and its employee.

=== Other rights of individuals ===
Section 16 to 23 cover other individual employment rights. Section 23 gives the Secretary of State the power to explicitly include categories of workers within the scope of employment protection legislation. Conspicuously, the minister has not done this for agency workers.

=== CAC, ACAS, Commissioners and Certification Officer ===
Sections 24 to 29 cover changes in rules concerning the Central Arbitration Committee, ACAS the commissioners and certification officers.

=== Miscellaneous ===
Sections 30 to 41 concern a variety of unrelated amendments to various previous laws.

Section 31 implements Schedule 7, which changed the rules on fees under the Employment Agencies Act 1973.

=== General ===
Sections 42 to 47 concern general provisions.

== See also ==
- Employment Relations Act
- Employment Rights Act 1996
