= Temporary Agency Work Directive 2008 =

The Temporary Agency Work Directive 2008/104/EC is an EU Directive agreed in November 2008 which seeks to guarantee those working through employment agencies equal pay and conditions with employees in the same business who do the same work. It is the third piece of legislation in the European Union's employment law package to protect atypical working (the others being for part-time workers and fixed-term workers). Though it was proposed in 2002, the British, German, Danish and Irish governments blocked its enactment until 2008.

== Provisions ==
The Directive on temporary agency work includes two main principles, which are at the same time at the centre of a balanced approach to regulation on temporary agency work:

Article 4 sets clear limits to prohibitions and restrictions that may be imposed on the use of temporary agency work. These are only justified on grounds related to the protection of temporary agency workers, to ensure that the labour market functions properly and that abuses are prevented. EU Member States are obliged to review prohibitions and restrictions on temporary agency work until and to report to the European Commission.

Article 5 establishes the principle of equal treatment for temporary agency workers. The basic employment and working conditions shall be – for the duration of the assignment at the user company – equal to those of a worker employed directly by that company to occupy the same position. Article 5 allows for derogations from this principle for open-ended contracts providing pay between assignments (Article 5, paragraph 2), to uphold collective labour agreements (Article 5, paragraph 3) or based on agreements of social partners (Article 5, paragraph 4).

== Purpose ==
As with several other EU directives in the area of employment and social policy, the political purpose of this directive is to set common minimum standards for temporary agency work in the EU. The political goals this serves is to prevent "unfair competition" between different member states. Common minimum standards are preferred by politicians to prevent a "race to the bottom" where every country tries to deregulate to attract business, and, theoretically, all end up "losing". The political goals are to ensure a higher standard of living and quality of life, consistent with the aims of the Treaty on European Union. Critics contend that the policies increase labour market inefficiencies and ultimately raise unemployment levels and reduce business output, leading to lowered living standards for those not already securely seated in permanent positions in the labour market.

== See also ==
- UK agency worker law
- UK Temporary and Agency Workers (Equal Treatment) Bill 2008
