= Norfolk and Suffolk Broads Act 1988 =

Act of the Parliament of the United Kingdom

Norfolk and Suffolk Broads Act 1988 (Note: Section 27(1).)
- Act of Parliament
- Parliament of the United Kingdom
- Long title: An Act to establish an authority to be known as the Broads Authority; to make provision with respect to its powers; to make provision with respect to the area commonly known as the Broads and with respect to the Great Yarmouth Port and Haven and its Commissioners; to provide for the making of grants to the Authority by the Secretary of State; and for connected purposes.
- Citation: 1988 c. 4
- Territorial extent: England and Wales (Note: Section 27(3).)

Dates
- Royal assent: 15 March 1988
- Commencement: various (Note: Section 26. The Norfolk and Suffolk Broads Act 1988 (Commencement) Order 1988 (SI 1988/155).)
Other legislation
Amends	Employers' Liability (Compulsory Insurance) Act 1969; Rent Act 1977; County Courts Act 1984
Amended by	Planning (Consequential Provisions) Act 1990; Employment Tribunals Act 1996; Employment Rights Act 1996; Justices of the Peace Act 1997Audit Commission Act 1998; Countryside and Rights of Way Act 2000; Commons Act 2006

Status: Amended

Text of statute as originally enacted

Revised text of statute as amended

Text of the Norfolk and Suffolk Broads Act 1988 as in force today (including any amendments) within the United Kingdom, from legislation.gov.uk.

The Norfolk and Suffolk Broads Act 1988 (c. 4) is an act of the Parliament of the United Kingdom which created the Broads Authority. It is the framework for the creation of Broads, an area qualifying for special conservation on account of its ecological value and giving the Broads a similar status, in part, and funding to the national parks of England and Wales.

The first ten British national parks were designated as such in the 1950s under the National Parks and Access to the Countryside Act 1949 in mostly poor-quality agricultural upland and designations subsequent to the Broads are also under the auspices of the 1949 Act. The Broads required separate legislation to give special consideration to the needs of navigation. The Act requires the Broads Authority to take account of the area's national importance and the need to protect it. It must promote public enjoyment, preserve natural amenity and maintain, improve and develop the navigation area.

== See also ==
- National parks of the United Kingdom
- National parks of England and Wales
- Areas of Outstanding Natural Beauty in England and Wales
