= Employment Agency Standards Inspectorate =

Division of the Labour Markets Directorate

The Employment Agency Standards Inspectorate (EAS) is located within the Department for Business and Trade. EAS is the government regulator for the private recruitment sector, regulating all employment agencies and employment businesses that provide work-finding services in Great Britain. It takes complaints and investigates breaches of the Employment Agencies Act 1973 and the Conduct of Employment Agencies and Businesses Regulations 2003. It also conducts inspections to ensure agencies' compliance with the legislation.

There are an estimated 32,000 private recruitment agencies in the UK, representing an industry turnover in excess of £38.9 billion a year.

== Annual report 2020–2021 ==
In the reporting year 2020–2021, it cleared 1800 complaints, completed 177 inspections, found 900 infringements and issued 267 warning letters. The total amount of money recovered for workers was £132.570. EAS also sought legal advice on 22 cases, resulting in 2 successful prosecutions, 3 prohibitions and 1 Labour Market Enforcement Undertakings Order (LMEO).

== Accounts ==
The budget for 2020/21 was increased from £1.125m to £1.525m, an increase of approx. 36%, to allow for the recruitment of more frontline inspectors as recommended by the DLME (Director Labour Market Enforcement), and to prepare for the introduction of the ‘Key Information Document’, which came into force on 6 April 2020. As a result of the growth of EAS, the inspectorate restructured to create a dedicated Operations Team of 18 frontline inspectors supported by colleagues on Intelligence, Risk, and IT (Information Technology).

== Past accounts ==
According to the Minister for Employment in 2005, the Inspectorate had the following resources,

2002–03, budget expenditure £659,000

- 12 regionally based Inspectors
- 3 Managers also with inspection powers
- 5 Helpline staff (to receive complaints, advise and answer worker and agency questions)

2003–04, budget expenditure £581,000

- 12 regionally based Inspectors
- 3 Managers also with inspection powers
- 4 Helpline staff (to receive complaints, advise and answer worker and agency questions)

2004–05, budget expenditure £566,000

- 12 regionally based Inspectors
- 3 Managers also with inspection powers
- 4 Helpline staff (to receive complaints, advise and answer worker and agency questions)

== See also ==
- UK agency worker law
- Gangmasters and Labour Abuse Authority
- Employment Act 2008
