= Gangmasters (Licensing) Act 2004 =

Act of the Parliament of the United Kingdom

Gangmasters (Licensing) Act 2004 (Note: Section 30(1).)
- Act of Parliament
- Parliament of the United Kingdom
- Long title: An Act to make provision for the licensing of activities involving the supply or use of workers in connection with agricultural work, the gathering of wild creatures and wild plants, the harvesting of fish from fish farms, and certain processing and packaging; and for connected purposes.
- Citation: 2004 c. 11
- Territorial extent: England and Wales; Scotland; Northern Ireland; (Note: Section 30(2).)

Dates
- Royal assent: 8 July 2004
- Commencement: Various (Note: Section 29.)
Other legislation
Amended by	Serious Organised Crime and Police Act 2005; Serious Crime Act 2007; Immigration Act 2016; Sentencing Act 2020; Employment Rights Act 2025

Status: Amended

Text of statute as originally enacted

Revised text of statute as amended

The Gangmasters (Licensing) Act 2004 (c. 11) is an act of the Parliament of the United Kingdom regulating agency workers.

== Background ==
The legislation was proposed soon after 23 Chinese cockle-pickers died as a result of the Morecambe Bay cockling disaster.

== Legislative passage ==
The legislation was passed as a private member's bill.

== Provisions ==
The act establishes a system of registration and licensing for employers.

Those operating without a licence can receive a sentence of up to 10 years, and farmers and food companies can face a sentence of up to 6 months.

The authority regulates the agriculture, shellfish and processing and packing sectors.

== Commencement ==
The following commencement orders have been made for this act:

- Gangmasters (Licensing) Act 2004 (Commencement No. 1) Order 2004 (SI 2004/2857)
- Gangmasters (Licensing) Act 2004 (Commencement No. 2) Order 2005 (SI 2005/447)
- Gangmasters (Licensing) Act 2004 (Commencement No. 3) Order 2006 (SI 2006/2406)
- Gangmasters (Licensing) Act 2004 (Commencement No. 4) Order 2006 (SI 2006/2906)
- Gangmasters (Licensing) Act 2004 (Commencement No. 5) Order 2007 (SI 2007/695)

== Reception ==
The bill was supported by the Environment, Food and Rural Affairs Select Committee.

== See also ==
- UK agency worker law
- Agency Workers Directive
- Employment Agencies Act 1973
