= Public Interest Disclosure Act 1998 =

Act of the Parliament of the United Kingdom

Public Interest Disclosure Act 1998 (Note: Section 18(1).)
- Act of Parliament
- Parliament of the United Kingdom
- Long title: An Act to protect individuals who make certain disclosures of information in the public interest; to allow such individuals to bring action in respect of victimisation; and for connected purposes
- Citation: 1998 c. 23
- Introduced by: Richard Shepherd (Commons)
- Territorial extent: England and Wales; Scotland; Northern Ireland (section 17 only); (Note: Section 18(5).)

Dates
- Royal assent: 2 July 1998
- Commencement: 2 July 1998 (in part); 2 July 1999 (rest of act); (Note: Section 18(3)–(5). The Public Interest Disclosure Act 1998 (Commencement) Order 1999 (SI 1999/23).)
Other legislation
Amends	Trade Union and Labour Relations (Consolidation) Act 1992; Employment Rights Act 1996
Amended by	Employment Relations Act 1999; Police Reform Act 2002

Status: Amended

Text of statute as originally enacted

Revised text of statute as amended

The Public Interest Disclosure Act 1998 (c. 23) is an act of the Parliament of the United Kingdom that protects whistleblowers from detrimental treatment by their employer. Influenced by various financial scandals and accidents, along with the report of the Committee on Standards in Public Life, the bill was introduced to Parliament by Richard Shepherd and given government support, on the condition that it become an amendment to the Employment Rights Act 1996. After receiving royal assent on 2 July 1998, the act came into force on 2 July 1999. It protects employees who make disclosures of certain types of information, including evidence of illegal activity or damage to the environment, from retribution from their employers, such as dismissal or being passed over for promotion. In cases where such retribution takes place the employee may bring a case before an employment tribunal, which can award compensation.

As a result of the act, employers are advised by organisations such as ACAS to have internal whistleblowing procedures. The act has been criticised for failing to force employers to institute such a policy, containing no provisions preventing the "blacklisting" of employees who make such disclosures, and failing to protect the employee from libel proceedings should their allegation turn out to be false.

Under the act a non-disclosure agreement (NDA) between an employer and employee, often a condition of compensation for loss of employment for some reason, does not remove a worker’s right to make a protected disclosure, i.e. to blow the whistle. In 2019 a consultation was held on adding limitations on confidentiality clauses, following evidence that some employers used confidentiality clauses to intimidate victims of harassment or discrimination into silence, suggesting that the worker did not have the right to blow the whistle, take a matter to a tribunal, or even discuss with people such as the police, a doctor, or a therapist.

== Background ==
Prior to the 1998 act, whistleblowers in the United Kingdom had no protection against being dismissed by their employer. Although they could avoid being sued for breach of confidence thanks to a public interest defence, that did not prevent subtle or open victimisation in the workplace, including disciplinary action, dismissal, failure to gain promotion or a pay rise. During the early to mid-1990s, interest in whistleblower protection grew, partially because of a series of financial scandals and health and safety accidents, which investigations showed could have been prevented if employees had been permitted to voice their concerns, and partially because of the work of the Committee on Standards in Public Life.

In 1995 and 1996, two private member's bills dealing with whistleblowers were introduced to Parliament, by Tony Wright and Don Touhig respectively, but both efforts fell through. When Richard Shepherd proposed a similar bill, however, he got government support for it on the condition that it be an amendment to the Employment Rights Act 1996 rather than a new area of law in its own right. Public Concern at Work, a UK-based whistleblowers charity, was involved in the drafting and consultation stages of the bill. The case of Graham Pink added to the pressure to introduce whistleblower protection legislation.

The Public Interest Disclosure Bill was introduced to the House of Commons by Shepherd in 1997, and given its second reading on 12 December before being sent to a committee. After being passed by the Commons it moved to the House of Lords on 27 April 1998, and was passed on 29 June, receiving Royal Assent on 2 July and becoming the Public Interest Disclosure Act 1998. Originally scheduled to come into force on 1 January 1999, the act instead became applicable law on 2 July.

== Contents ==
Section 1 of the act inserts sections 43A to L into the Employment Rights Act 1996, titled "Protected Disclosures". It provides that a disclosure which the whistleblower makes to their employer, a "prescribed person", in the course of seeking legal advice, Ministers of the Crown, individuals appointed by the Secretary of State for that purpose, or, in limited circumstances, "any other person", is protected. In addition, the disclosure must be one which the whistleblower "reasonably believes" shows a criminal offence, a failure to comply with legal obligations, a miscarriage of justice, danger to the health and safety of employees, damage to the environment, or the hiding of information which would show any of the above actions. These disclosures do not have to be of confidential information, and this section does not abolish the public interest defence; in addition, it can be the disclosure of information about actions which have already occurred, are occurring, or could occur in the future. In Miklaszewicz v Stolt Offshore Ltd, the Employment Appeal Tribunal confirmed that the disclosure does not have to have been made after the act came into force; it is sufficient for the dismissal or other persecution by the employer to have happened after that time.

The list of "prescribed persons" is found in the Public Interest Disclosure (Prescribed Persons) Order 1999, and includes only official bodies; the Health and Safety Executive, the Data Protection Registrar, the Certification Officer, the Environment Agency and the Secretary of State for Trade and Industry. An employee will be protected if he "makes a disclosure in good faith" to one of these people, and "reasonably believes that the relevant failure...is a matter in respect of which the person is prescribed and the information is substantially true". Other prescribed persons include the Scottish Environment Protection Agency, in relation to "acts or omissions which have an actual or potential effect on the environment... including those relating to pollution".

If an employee makes such a disclosure, Section 2 inserts a new Section 47B, providing that the employee shall suffer no detriment in their employment as a result. That includes both negative actions and the absence of action and so covers discipline, dismissal, or failing to gain a pay rise or access to facilities which would otherwise have been provided. If an employee suffers a detriment, he is permitted to make a complaint before an employment tribunal under Section 3. In front of an employment tribunal, the law is amended in Sections 4 and 5 to provide compensation, and to reverse the burden of proof. If an employee has been dismissed for making a protected disclosure, this dismissal is automatically considered unfair. Similarly, under Section 6, an employee cannot be given priority when he discusses redundancies simply because he made such a disclosure. These sections take into account Section 7, which notes that there is no requirement of age or length of employment before they come into effect.

Under Section 8, the Secretary of State could pass a statutory instrument setting out the rules and limits surrounding compensation for the employee's dismissal after making a protected disclosure; until this is done, Section 9 provided interim remedies, which were the same as in other cases of unfair dismissal. The Secretary of State passed such an instrument, the Public Interest Disclosure (Compensation) Regulations 1999, but Section 8 has now been repealed under Section 44 of the Employment Relations Act 1999. Under Section 10, the act applies to crown servants, excepting under Section 11, those who are employees of MI5, MI6 or GCHQ. The act does exclude, in Sections 12 and 13, serving police officers and those employed outside the United Kingdom.

== Assessment and impact ==
Terry Corbin, writing in the Criminal Law and Justice Weekly, notes that the result of the act has been that many more employers have developed internal processes for reporting issues, partially because of a desire to fix problems before they become publicly reported and partially because if employees choose not to use those processes and instead take action under the 1998 act, there is a greater chance that the employer can depict their behaviour as "unreasonable". However, a survey done by Public Concern At Work showed that in 2010, only 38 percent of those surveyed worked for companies with whistleblowing policies in place, and only 23 percent knew that legal protection for whistleblowers existed. The number of cases brought by whistleblowers to employment tribunals has increased more than tenfold, from 157 in 1999/2000 to 1,761 in 2008/9.

David Lewis, writing in the Industrial Law Journal, highlights what he perceives as weaknesses in the legislation. Firstly, it does not force employers to make a policy relating to disclosures. Secondly, it does not prevent employers from "blacklisting" and refusing to hire those who are known within the industry to have made disclosures in previous jobs. The complexity of the law was also criticised, as if such a disclosure turns out to be incorrect, the employee may be sued for libel by his employer. Volunteers and self-employed people are not covered, and the same goes for those who, in disclosing the information, commit a criminal offence. Also, the law does not make any provision for psychological harm caused by whistleblowing, which research shows is common.

== See also ==
- Eileen Chubb

== Bibliography ==
- Corbitt, Terry (2003). "Employees' Family Rights and the Public Interest Disclosure Act 1998". Criminal Law and Justice Weekly. 167 (20). LexisNexis. ISSN 1741-4555.
- Craig, Vic (1999). "Public Interest Disclosure Act 1998: prescribed persons and compensation". Employment Law Bulletin. 32 (2). Sweet & Maxwell. ISSN 1352-2159.
- Gobert, James; Maurice Punch (2000). "Whistleblowers, the Public Interest, and the Public Interest Disclosure Act 1998". Modern Law Review. 63 (1). Blackwell Publishers. ISSN 0026-7961.
- Gunasekara, Gehan (2003). "Whistle-Blowing: New Zealand and UK Solutions to a Common Problem". Statute Law Review. 24 (1). Oxford University Press. ISSN 1464-3863.
- Lewis, David (1998). "The Public Interest Disclosure Act 1998". Industrial Law Journal. 27 (4). Industrial Law Society. ISSN 0305-9332.
- Lewis, David (2005). "Providing Rights for Whistleblowers: Would an Anti-Discrimination Model be More Effective?". Industrial Law Journal. 34 (3). Industrial Law Society. ISSN 0305-9332.
- Lewis, David (2010). "Ten Years of Public Interest Disclosure Act 1998 Claims: What Can We Learn from the Statistics and Recent Research?". Industrial Law Journal. 39 (1). Industrial Law Society. ISSN 0305-9332.
