= Employment Protection (Consolidation) Act 1978 =

Act of the Parliament of the United Kingdom

Employment Protection (Consolidation) Act 1978 (Note: Section 160(1).)
- Act of Parliament
- Parliament of the United Kingdom
- Long title: An Act to consolidate certain enactments relating to rights of employees arising out of their employment; and certain enactments relating to the insolvency of employers; to industrial tribunals; to recoupment of certain benefits; to conciliation officers; and to the Employment Appeal Tribunal.
- Citation: 1978 c. 44
- Territorial extent: England and Wales; Scotland; Northern Ireland (in part); (Note: Section 160(3).)

Dates
- Royal assent: 31 July 1978
- Commencement: 1 November 1978; 1 January 1979; (Note: Section 160(2).)
Other legislation
Amends	Trade Union Act 1913; See § Repealed enactments
Repeals/revokes	See § Repealed enactments
Amended by	Statute Law (Repeals) Act 1981; Judicial Pensions Act 1981; Armed Forces Act 1981; New Towns Act 1981; Civil Aviation Act 1982; Industrial Training Act 1982; Employment Act 1982; Reserve Forces (Safeguard of Employment) Act 1985; Bankruptcy (Scotland) Act 1985; Housing (Consequential Provisions) Act 1985; Wages Act 1986; Social Security Act 1986; Sex Discrimination Act 1986; Income and Corporation Taxes Act 1988; Dock Work Act 1989; Employment Act 1989; Statute Law (Repeals) Act 1989; National Health Service and Community Care Act 1990; Social Security (Consequential Provisions) Act 1992; Trade Union and Labour Relations (Consolidation) Act 1992; Tribunals and Inquiries Act 1992; Pension Schemes Act 1993; Collective Redundancies and Transfer of Undertakings (Protection of Employment) (Amendment) Regulations 1995; Employment Tribunals Act 1996; Employment Rights Act 1996; Trade Union Reform and Employment Rights Act 1993

Status: Partially repealed

Text of statute as originally enacted

Revised text of statute as amended

Text of the Employment Protection (Consolidation) Act 1978 as in force today (including any amendments) within the United Kingdom, from legislation.gov.uk.

The Employment Protection (Consolidation) Act 1978 (c. 44) is an act of the Parliament of the United Kingdom which formed a central part of UK labour law. It consolidated two earlier pieces of legislation, the Contracts of Employment Act 1963 and the Redundancy Payments Act 1965.

The act was partially repealed by the Employment Act 1982, and the remaining clauses were repealed and replaced by the Employment Rights Act 1996.

== Provisions ==
In 1994, the act was found to indirectly discriminate against women, and was therefore incompatible with European Community law.

Religious ministers were not protected by the act.

Ill-health was a permitted reason for dismissal.

=== Repealed enactments ===
Section 159(3) of the act repealed 29 enactments, listed in schedule 17 to the act.

Citation	Short title	Extent of repeal
1964 c. 16	Industrial Training Act 1964	Section 12(2B), (3) and (4).
1965 c. 62	Redundancy Payments Act 1965	Sections 1 to 26. Sections 30 to 44. Sections 46 to 55 except section 55(6)(b). Sections 56 to 58. In section 59, subsection (2) and in subsection (3) the words " except the last preceding section ". Schedules 1 to 9.
1967 c. 17	Iron and Steel Act 1967	In section 31, in subsection (3), paragraph (c) and all the words following paragraph (c), and subsections (4)(b) and (6).
1967 c. 28	Superannuation (Miscellaneous Provisions) Act 1967	Section 9.
1968 c. 13	National Loans Act 1968	In Schedule 1, the paragraph relating to the Redundancy Payments Act 1965.
1969 c. 8	Redundancy Rebates Act 1969	The whole act.
1969 c. 48	Post Office Act 1969	In Schedule 9, paragraph 34.
1970 c. 41	Equal Pay Act 1970	Section 2(7).
1971 c. 75	Civil Aviation Act 1971	In Schedule 9, paragraph 2.
1972 c. 11	Superannuation Act 1972	In Schedule 6, paragraphs 54 and 55.
1972 c. 53	Contracts of Employment Act 1972	The whole act.
1972 c. 54	British Library Act 1972	In paragraph 13(2) of the Schedule, the definition of " the Act of 1963 ".
1972 c. 58	National Health Service (Scotland) Act 1972	In Schedule 6, paragraph 130.
1973 c. 32	National Health Service Reorganisation Act 1973	In Schedule 4, paragraph 106.
1973 c. 38	Social Security Act 1973	In Schedule 27, paragraphs 54 to 59.
1973 c. 50	Employment and Training Act 1973	In Schedule 2 in Part I, paragraph 15.
1974 c. 52	Trade Union and Labour Relations Act 1974	In section 1(2), paragraphs (6) and (c) and, in paragraph (d), the references to sections 146, 148, 149, 150 and 151 of the 1971 Act. In section 30(1), the definitions of " dismissal procedures agreement ", " position " and "job". In Schedule 1, paragraphs 4 to 16, 17(1), 18, 20 to 27 and 30, in paragraph 32, sub-paragraphs (1)(b) and (2)(b) to (e) and, in paragraph 33, sub-paragraphs (3)(c) and (d) and (4A). In Schedule 3, paragraph 16. In Schedule 4, paragraphs 1, 3 and 6(4).
1975 c. 18	Social Security (Consequential Provisions) Act 1975	In Schedule 2, paragraphs 19 to 23.
1975 c. 60	Social Security Pensions Act 1975	Section 30(5).
1975 c. 71	Employment Protection Act 1975	Part II except section 40. Section 108(2) to (8). Section 109. Section 112. In section 118(2), in paragraph (a) the words "section 22 above or " and " section 28 or, as the case may be," and paragraphs (b) and (c). In section 119— subsection (2); in subsection (3) the figures from "22" to "70"; in subsection (4) the figures from "22" to "81"; in subsection (5), the figures from " 22 " to " 81 "; in subsection (7) the figures " 22 " and " 29 "; subsections (8) to (11); in subsection (12) the figures from "59" to "81". Section 120. In section 121— in subsection (1), the reference to sections 47 and 63 to 69; in subsection (5), the reference to sections 47(3) and (4) and 68(3) and (4); subsection (8). In section 122(1), the words " Schedule 1 to the Contracts of Employment Act 1972 and Parts I and II of Schedule 1 to the 1974 Act"; and in paragraph (d), the words "paragraph 21(5)(c) of Schedule 1 to the 1974 Act and". In section 122, subsection (3), in subsection (4) the definition of " civil employment claim " and in subsection (5) the words from "and of the Redundancy" to "employment claim ". In section 123(2)(6) the words " 28 or ". In section 124, subsections (2) to (4). In section 126— in subsection (1), the definitions of " guarantee payment " and " maternity pay"; subsections (3) and (5). In section 127— in subsection (1), paragraphs (c) and (d); in subsection (3)(g), the words from " the following " to " also of". In section 128— in subsection (1), the words " or of the 1974 Act so far as it relates to unfair dismissal " and " and the 1974 Act"; subsection (2); in subsection (3), the words " and the relevant provisions of the 1974 Act" in both places where they occur, and the words " or the relevant provisions of the 1974 Act". Section 129(2). Schedules 2 to 6. In Schedule 12— in paragraph 1, the words from " and " to the end; paragraphs 8 to 12. In Schedule 16— Parts I and II; in Part III, paragraphs 8 to 30 and 34; in Part IV, paragraph 14. In Schedule 17, paragraphs 7 to 10,16 and 17.
1976 c. 7	Trade Union and Labour Relations (Amendment) Act 1976	Section 1(e). Section 3(5) and (6).
1976 c. 68	New Towns (Amendment) Act 1976	In section 13(5), the words " sections 1 and 2 of ".
1976 c. 71	Supplementary Benefits Act 1976	In Schedule 7, paragraph 40.
1976 c. 74	Race Relations Act 1976	In Schedule 3, paragraphs 1(2), (3) and (4).
1976 c. 79	Dock Work Regulation Act 1976	In section 14, subsections (1) to (5) and in subsection (6), paragraph (a) and so much of paragraph (b) as relates to sections 22, 29, 61, 64, 65 and 70 of the Employment Protection Act 1975. In Schedule 1, paragraph 17(2).
1977 c. 5	Social Security (Miscellaneous Provisions) Act 1977	Section 16.
1977 c. 22	Redundancy Rebates Act 1977	The whole act.
1977 c. 38	Administration of Justice Act 1977	Section 6. Section 32(11).
1977 c. 48	Housing (Homeless Persons) Act 1977	In section 14(4)(b), the words " sections 1 and 2 of ".

== See also ==
- United Kingdom labour law
- Polkey v AE Dayton Services Ltd - an unfair dismissal court case.
