= Dacas v Brook Street Bureau (UK) Ltd =

- Court: Court of Appeal
- Citation: [2004] EWCA Civ 217

Court membership
- Judges sitting: Mummery LJ, Sedley LJ and Munby J

Keywords
- Implied contract, mutuality of obligation, employee, unfair dismissal

Dacas v Brook Street Bureau (UK) Ltd [2004] EWCA Civ 217 is a UK labour law case, concerning the employment rights of agency workers.

== Facts ==
Patricia Dacas had worked for Wandsworth LBC (on assignment through Brook Street plc) as a cleaner for four years. She was dismissed for apparent rudeness to a visitor. She claimed unfair dismissal against both Brook Street and the local council.

The Employment Tribunal held that Dacas had neither a contract of service with the employment agency, nor any contract at all with the council. On appeal, the Employment Appeal Tribunal held the Tribunal had erred in law, and found that Dacas was employed by Brook Street.

== Judgment ==
The Court of Appeal, Mummery LJ, Sedley LJ and Munby J, held that Brook Street had been under no obligation to provide Dacas with work, and Dacas had been under no obligation to accept, and simply because Brook Street had paid her, this did not make Brook Street her employer. Instead the council had day to day control. So the Tribunal had been correct to find no employment contract between Dacas and Brook Street. Instead, it was possible for there to have been an implied contract between the council and Dacas, but this point had not been appealed. They thought an employment contract would exist between Dacas and the council after ‘considering all the evidence’.

== See also ==
- UK labour law
