= Employment Act 1980 =

Act of the Parliament of the United Kingdom

Employment Act 1980 (Note: Section 21(1).)
- Act of Parliament
- Parliament of the United Kingdom
- Long title: An Act to provide for payments out of public funds towards trade unions' expenditure in respect of ballots, for the use of employers' premises in connection with ballots, and for the issue by the Secretary of State of Codes of Practice for the improvement of industrial relations; to make provision in respect of exclusion or expulsion from trade unions and otherwise to amend the law relating to workers, employers, trade unions and employers' associations; to repeal section 1A of the Trade Union and Labour Relations Act 1974; and for connected purposes.
- Citation: 1980 c. 42
- Territorial extent: England and Wales; Scotland; Northern Ireland (paragraph 7 of schedule 1); (Note: Section 21(4).)

Dates
- Royal assent: 1 August 1980
- Commencement: various (Note: Section 21(2)–(3).)
Other legislation
Amends	Wages Councils Act 1948
Amended by	Contempt of Court Act 1981; Trade Union and Labour Relations (Consolidation) Act 1992; Trade Union Reform and Employment Rights Act 1993; Employment Tribunals Act 1996; Employment Rights Act 1996

Status: Partially repealed

Text of statute as originally enacted

Revised text of statute as amended

Text of the Employment Act 1980 as in force today (including any amendments) within the United Kingdom, from legislation.gov.uk.

The Employment Act 1980 (c. 42) is an act of the Parliament of the United Kingdom, passed under the first term of Margaret Thatcher's premiership and mainly relating to trade unions.

== Overview ==
It restricted the definition of lawful picketing 'strictly to those who were themselves party to the dispute and who were picketing at the premises of their own employer'.

It also introduced ballots on the existence of closed shops, and at least 80% of the workers in a particular industry need to support them for their maintenance.

== See also ==
- United Kingdom labour law

== Bibliography ==
- B A Hepple, Paul O'Higgins and Lord Wedderburn of Charlton. Sweet & Maxwell's Labour Relations Statutes and Materials. Second Edition. Sweet & Maxwell. London. 1983. ISBN 0 421 32010 9. pp 446–457.
