= Labour Bureaux (London) Act 1902 =

Act of the Parliament of the United Kingdom

Labour Bureaux (London) Act 1902 (Note: Section 4.)
- Act of Parliament
- Parliament of the United Kingdom
- Long title: An Act to authorise the establishment of Labour Bureaux throughout the Metropolis.
- Citation: 2 Edw. 7. c. 13
- Territorial extent: United Kingdom

Dates
- Royal assent: 22 July 1902
- Commencement: 22 July 1902 (Note: The Acts of Parliament (Commencement) Act 1793.)
- Repealed: 18 July 1973
Other legislation
Repealed by	Statute Law (Repeals) Act 1973

Status: Repealed

Text of statute as originally enacted

The Labour Bureaux (London) Act 1902 (2 Edw. 7. c. 13) was an act of the Parliament of the United Kingdom, given royal assent on 22 July 1902 and repealed in 1973.

It authorised the establishment of labour bureaux by borough councils throughout London, to be funded out of the general rates. Ten such bureaux were established between the passage of the act and 1906.

It was passed as a private members' bill.

== Subsequent developments ==
The whole act was repealed by section 1(1) of, and part XIII of schedule 1 to, the Statute Law (Repeals) Act 1973, which came into force on 18 July 1973.
