= Employment agency =

Organization which matches employers to employees

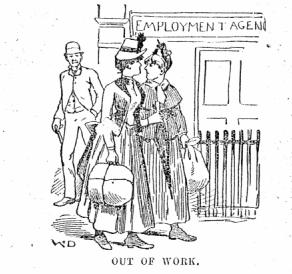
Journalist Nellie Bly investigating employment agencies

An employment agency is an organization which matches employers to employees. In developed countries, there are multiple private businesses which act as employment agencies and a publicly funded employment agency.

== Public employment agencies ==
One of the oldest references to a public employment agency was in 1650, when Henry Robinson proposed an "Office of Addresses and Encounters" that would link employers to workers. The British Parliament rejected the proposal, but he himself opened such a business, which was short-lived.

Called "intelligence offices", employment agencies had by the 1840s developed a seedy reputation. The moral reformer publication, "Friend of Virtue," building on this long-standing ill-fame, consistently depicted employment agents as villains in stories of young women lured to New England cities on false pretenses and tricked into lives of prostitution.

In the United Kingdom, a well-regarded labour exchange was established by social reformer and employment campaigner Alsager Hay Hill in London in 1871. This was later augmented by officially sanctioned exchanges created by the Labour Bureau (London) Act 1902, which subsequently went nationwide, a movement prompted by the Liberal government through the Labour Exchanges Act 1909. The present public provider of job search help is called Jobcentre Plus.

In the United States, a federal program of employment services was rolled out in the New Deal. The initial legislation was called the Wagner-Peyser Act of 1933 and more recently job services happen through one-stop centers established by the Workforce Investment Act of 1998.

In Australia, the first official public employment service was set up in 1946, called the Commonwealth Employment Service.

== Private employment agency ==
The first known private employment agency Robinson, Gabbitas & Thring, was founded in 1873 by John Gabbitas who recruited schoolmasters for public schools in England. In the United States, the first private employment agency was opened by Fred Winslow who started an Engineering Agency in 1893. It later became part of General Employment Enterprises who also owned Businessmen's Clearing House (est. 1902). Another of the oldest agencies was developed by Katharine Felton as a response to the problems brought on by the 1906 San Francisco earthquake and fire.

=== Status from the International Labour Organization ===
The International Labour Organization's first ever Recommendation was targeted at fee charging agencies. The Unemployment Recommendation, 1919 (No.1), Art. 1 called for each member to,

"take measures to prohibit the establishment of employment agencies which charge fees or which carry on their business for profit. Where such agencies already exist, it is further recommended that they be permitted to operate only under government licenses, and that all practicable measures be taken to abolish such agencies as soon as possible."

The Unemployment Convention, 1919, Art. 2 instead required the alternative of

"a system of free public employment agencies under the control of a central authority. Committees, which shall include representatives of employers and workers, shall be appointed to advise on matters concerning the carrying on of these agencies."

In 1933 the Fee-Charging Employment Agencies Convention (No.34) formally called for abolition. The exception was if the agencies were licensed and a fee scale was agreed in advance. In 1949 a new revised Convention (No.96) was produced. This kept the same scheme, but secured an 'opt out' (Art.2) for members that did not wish to sign up. Agencies were an increasingly entrenched part of the labor market. The United States did not sign up to the Conventions. The latest Convention, the Private Employment Agencies Convention, 1997 (No.181) takes a much softer stance and calls merely for regulation.

In most countries, agencies are regulated, for instance in the UK under the Employment Agencies Act 1973, or in Germany under the Arbeitnehmerüberlassungsgesetz (Employee Hiring Law of 1972).

=== Executive recruitment ===
An executive-search firm specializes in recruiting executive personnel for companies in various industries. This term may apply to job-search-consulting firms who charge job candidates a fee and who specialize in mid-to-upper-level executives. In the United States, some states require job-search-consulting firms to be licensed as employment agencies.

Some third-party recruiters work on their own, while others operate through an agency, acting as direct contacts between client companies and the job candidates they recruit. They can specialize in client relationships only (sales or business development), in finding candidates (recruiting or sourcing), or in both areas. Most recruiters tend to specialize in either permanent, full-time, direct-hire positions or in contract positions, but occasionally in more than one. In an executive-search assignment, the employee-gaining client company – not the person being hired – pays the search firm its fee.

=== Executive agent ===
An executive agent is a type of agency that represents executives seeking senior executive positions which are often unadvertised. In the United Kingdom, almost all positions up to £125,000 ($199,000) a year are advertised and 50% of vacancies paying £125,000 – £150,000 are advertised. However, only 5% of positions which pay more than £150,000 (with the exception of the public sector) are advertised and are often in the domain of around 4,000 executive recruiters in the United Kingdom. Often such roles are unadvertised to maintain stakeholder confidence and to overcome internal uncertainties.

=== Staffing types ===
Contract - Contract staffing refers to a type of employment arrangement where an individual is hired by a company for a predetermined period to work on a specific project or task. Contracts can vary in duration and may be short-term or long-term. This arrangement often benefits employers by providing flexibility in staffing for temporary needs. In contract staffing, individuals, often referred to as "contractors" or "consultants," bring specialized skills and expertise to tackle short-term projects or address specific organizational needs. This staffing model is prevalent in industries like IT and engineering, where demand for specialized skills can fluctuate. Contract employees may be called independent contractors, 1099 employees, or freelancers, and are considered self-employed workers who operate on a contract basis for clients

Contract-to-hire - Contract-to-hire, also known as temp-to-perm, is a staffing model where an employee initially works for a company as a contractor or temporary worker with the possibility of being hired as a permanent employee after a trial period. This arrangement allows employers to assess an employee's skills and fit for a role before making a long-term commitment. Contract-to-hire arrangements, sometimes termed "try before you buy", allow companies to evaluate a candidate's cultural fit and performance before committing to a permanent hire. This approach can mitigate hiring risks and ensure a better match between the candidate and the organization's long-term goals.

Temporary - Temporary staffing involves hiring individuals for short-term positions to meet immediate staffing needs. Temporary workers are typically employed by staffing agencies and may work on assignments ranging from a few days to several months. This provides flexibility for employers to manage fluctuations in workload.

Part-time - Part-time staffing refers to employment where individuals work fewer hours than full-time employees. Part-time employees often have a set schedule but work fewer hours per week or month. This arrangement is commonly used in industries with variable workloads or to accommodate employees seeking work-life balance.

Full-time - Full-time staffing is the traditional employment model where individuals work a standard 40-hour workweek. Full-time employees typically receive benefits such as health insurance and paid time off. This type of staffing is common in many industries and offers job stability. This model is standard across many industries, fostering loyalty and long-term commitment.

GAP staffing (graphic arts professional) - GAP staffing, specific to graphic arts professionals, may involve hiring individuals with specialized skills in graphic design, illustration, or related fields on a temporary or contract basis to fill gaps in creative teams. This staffing type is essential for companies with fluctuating design and creative needs. This term is not widely used but is niche within the recruiting space.

=== Terms of business ===
Many agencies offer partial refunds on their fees if appointed staff do not remain for long in employment, if invoices have been paid within seven days of issue. This allows the agency and employer to share risk. In 2006, the Court of Appeal for England and Wales ruled that the loss of such a refund in circumstances where invoices had not promptly been paid did not amount to a "penalty charge" under the English law which then applied, because the legal issues regarding penalty clauses only arose in circumstances where a breach of contract was potentially being penalised. The issues in the case of Euro London Appointments Ltd. v Claessens International Ltd. did not amount to a breach of contract. This ruling enabled UK recruitment agencies to maintain this practice within their terms and conditions.

== See also ==
- Bundesagentur für Arbeit, German federal employment agency
- Contingent workforce
- Hiring hall
- Human resource management
- Olsen v. Nebraska, a US legal case concerning compensation issues with private employment agencies
- Payrolling
- Personnel selection
- Professional employer organization
- Recruitment
- Talent agent
- Temporary work
- UK agency worker law
