= Employment Rights Act 1996 =

Act of the Parliament of the United Kingdom

Employment Rights Act 1996 (Note: Section 245.)
- Act of Parliament
- Parliament of the United Kingdom
- Long title: An Act to consolidate enactments relating to employment rights.
- Citation: 1996 c. 18
- Territorial extent: England and Wales; Scotland (in part); Northern Ireland (in part); (Note: Section 244.)

Dates
- Royal assent: 22 May 1996
- Commencement: 22 August 1996 (Note: Section 243.)
Other legislation
Amends	Attachment of Earnings Act 1971; Lotteries and Amusements Act 1976; New Towns (Scotland) Act 1977; House of Commons (Administration) Act 1978; Employment Protection (Consolidation) Act 1978; National Heritage Act 1983; National Heritage (Scotland) Act 1985; Trustee Savings Banks Act 1985; Legal Aid (Scotland) Act 1986; Debtors (Scotland) Act 1987; Pilotage Act 1987; Social Security Contributions and Benefits Act 1992; Social Security (Consequential Provisions) Act 1992; Further and Higher Education Act 1992; Museums and Galleries Act 1992; Jobseekers Act 1995; See § Repealed enactments
Repeals/revokes	See § Repealed enactments
Amended by	Armed Forces Act 1996; Education Act 1996; Health and Safety (Consultation with Employees) Regulations 1996; Police (Health and Safety) Act 1997; Police Act 1997; Employment Rights (Dispute Resolution) Act 1998; Social Security Act 1998; Petroleum Act 1998; Audit Commission Act 1998; Public Interest Disclosure Act 1998; Teaching and Higher Education Act 1998; School Standards and Framework Act 1998; Government of Wales Act 1998; National Minimum Wage Act 1998; Working Time Regulations 1998; Employment Relations Act 1999; Tax Credits Act 2002; Employment Act 2002; Sunday Working (Scotland) Act 2003; Statute Law (Repeals) Act 2004; Work and Families Act 2006; National Health Service (Consequential Provisions) Act 2006; Employment Act 2008; Apprenticeships, Skills, Children and Learning Act 2009; Welfare Reform Act 2009; Coroners and Justice Act 2009; Agency Workers Regulations 2010; Equality Act 2010; Enterprise and Regulatory Reform Act 2013; Children and Families Act 2014; Deregulation Act 2015; Trade Union Act 2016; Children and Social Work Act 2017; Parental Bereavement (Leave and Pay) Act 2018; Neonatal Care (Leave and Pay) Act 2023; Worker Protection (Amendment of Equality Act 2010) Act 2023; Employment Rights Act 2025
Relates to	Employment Tribunals Act 1996

Status: Amended

Text of statute as originally enacted

Text of the Employment Rights Act 1996 as in force today (including any amendments) within the United Kingdom, from legislation.gov.uk.

The Employment Rights Act 1996 (c. 18) is an act of the Parliament of the United Kingdom passed by the Conservative government to codify existing law on individual rights in UK labour law.

== History ==
Previous statutes, dating from the Contracts of Employment Act 1963, included the Redundancy Payments Act 1965, the Employment Protection Act 1975, and the Wages Act 1986. It deals with rights that most employees can get when they work, including unfair dismissal, reasonable notice before dismissal, time off rights for parenting, redundancy and more. It was amended substantially by the Labour government since 1997, to include the right to request flexible working time. This coincides with the Rights at Work Act 1995.

== Part I, Employment particulars ==
An employee has an employment contract. ERA 1996 section 1(2) states, that the main terms of the contract must be in writing and provided to the employee within two months of the start of their employment. This document is called a "written statement of particulars". It confirms the main express terms of the employment contract. Whilst not definitive of the entire contract, the written statement is intended to be a guide for employees' of their rights, so that they know what kind of terms and conditions of employment to expect. But it is also meant to provide an evidential basis on which to bring a claim for the breach of some right in a court or employment tribunal.

Employers, in particular those in a small business environment, often make an error in believing that the "Written Statement of Particulars" – usually known as the terms and conditions of employment are "The Contract". The requirement in law therefore to produce the written express terms is often forgotten as they have the basis of a contract in place. Common practice is for a combined document "Contract of Employment" which provides the "Written Statement of Particulars" to be provided for the employee, which covers all the legal requirements.

== Parts IVA and V, Disclosures and detriment ==
This part provides protection against "detriment" suffered because of disclosing information for public benefit. These measures were originally added by the Public Interest Disclosure Act 1998 and are intended to provide broad protection to employees to report criminal offences, failures to abide by legal obligations, miscarriages of justice, health and safety violations, or environmental damage (s43B). This does not give employees a right to commit a criminal offence in disclosing information, nor to breach the obligations of legally protected professional privilege (as might apply between a doctor and patient, or a lawyer and client).

== Parts IV, VI and VII, Sundays, betting, time off and suspension ==
- Paid time off work for public duties (e.g. jury duty), antenatal care, and training. (Part VI)
- Dismissal related to health and safety or asserting statutory rights and dismissal related to a request for flexible working are to be considered automatically unfair under the ERA.

== Part IX, Dismissal notice and reasons ==
Employees have a right to reasonable notice before having their contracts terminated under section 86. At present this means everyone should get a minimum of one week's notice before being dismissed if they have worked for the employer for more than a month. After two years, the minimum is two weeks' notice. After three years, three weeks' notice, and so on, up to a maximum of twelve weeks' notice. Many employees will have higher notice periods in their contracts, or under the protection of collective agreements established by the workplace union. However nothing prevents employers giving pay in lieu of notice if it is expressly provided for in the employee's contract of employment, staff handbook, or other relevant documents. Both parties can also agree within that period to waive their rights.

Both this right and the right to written particulars of one's contract of employment were introduced through the Contracts of Employment Act 1963.

== Part X, Unfair dismissal ==
Employees have a right under section 94 of the act not to be unfairly dismissed. This is probably the most important right, because it would usually be under an action after dismissal that a former employee would complain that his other rights were breached. Firstly, it is unusual to commence litigation against an employer while still working for them. Secondly, some rights such as the right to reasonable notice before dismissal (s.86) can logically only be breached when someone is dismissed.

The reasons laid out that an employer can dismiss are in s.98(2). Fair reasons to dismiss an employee are if it,

(a) relates to the capability or qualifications of the employee for performing work of the kind which he or she was employed by the employer to do,

(b) relates to the conduct of the employee,

(c) is that the employee was redundant, or

(d) is that the employee could not continue to work in the position which he held without contravention (either on his part or on that of his employer) of a duty or restriction imposed by or under an enactment.

So there is no restriction on management's right to dismiss (for instance, giving reasonable notice) if the employee is (a) just bad at his job, (b) not a nice person to work with (c) is redundant (see below) or (d) the employer is forced to sack someone because of a law (this last one does not come up often). An important detail, however is that an employer may also dismiss, under s.98(1) for "some other substantial reason".

Most dismissals take place for legitimate business reasons, because the employer will no longer require staff, or maybe because times are bad and the employer can no longer afford to pay. There may be the possibility of claiming redundancy (see below). But employers will usually be happy to write a reference. If they do there is an obligation to be accurate and fair, and that means not providing a so-called "kiss of death" reference on to the next potential employer: if only bad things can be said, nothing should be said at all (see the case, Spring v Guardian Assurance plc).

=== Complaints to a tribunal ===
The way to enforce a claim for unfair dismissal is at an employment tribunal. An employee who is dismissed may also have breach of contract claim(s), based on common law. Common law claim(s) may be brought in a county court. Employment tribunals are spread around the country, in most towns. The right to bring a case falls under Part X, Chapter 2, s.111.

111.— Complaints to employment tribunal

(1) A complaint may be presented to an employment tribunal against an employer by an employee who was unfairly dismissed by the employer.

(2) Subject to subsection (3), an employment tribunal shall not consider a complaint under this section unless it is presented to the tribunal—

(a) before the end of the period of three months beginning with the effective date of termination, or
(b) within such further period as the tribunal considers reasonable in a case where it is satisfied that it was not reasonably practicable for the complaint to be presented before the end of that period of three months.

(3) Where a dismissal is with notice, an employment tribunal shall consider a complaint under this section if it is presented after the notice is given but before the effective date of termination.

(4) In relation to a complaint which is presented as mentioned in subsection (3), the provisions of this Act, so far as they relate to unfair dismissal, have effect as if—

(a) references to a complaint by a person that he was unfairly dismissed by his employer included references to a complaint by a person that his employer has given him notice in such circumstances that he will be unfairly dismissed when the notice expires,
(b) references to reinstatement included references to the withdrawal of the notice by the employer,
(c) references to the effective date of termination included references to the date which would be the effective date of termination on the expiry of the notice, and
(d) references to an employee ceasing to be employed included references to an employee having been given notice of dismissal.

The case of Beasley v National Grid Electricity Transmission upheld the argument that the time limit in section 111(2)(a) operates absolutely in circumstances where it is reasonably practicable to comply with it: applications which are slightly late in being presented (88 seconds in the case of Beasley's application) are nevertheless late and fall out of the jurisdiction of the tribunal.

=== Settlement agreements ===
The settlement agreement is a new concept which replaces the former "compromise agreement". Section 111A(2) of the ERA 1996 (as amended) provides for "pre-termination negotiations" that are: "any offers made or discussions held, before the termination of the employment in question, with a view to it being terminated on terms agreed between the employer and the employee".

The new provisions, which came into force on 29 July 2013, allow an employer to seek agreement with an employee for the latter's dismissal, thereby avoiding any risk of tribunal litigation for wrongful or unfair dismissal. The employee is invited to attend a meeting and may bring a companion (a fellow employee or a trade union officer). The employer, having discussed the issues, can make a written offer of termination, and the employee should be given 10 days to consider. The negotiations are confidential and "without prejudice". A Settlement Agreement is enforceable, but the employer is advised to have a "clawback" clause to allow recovery of any termination sums paid should evidence of misdeeds by the employee later arise. The discussions must observe ACAS Code of Practice 4 guidelines on settlement agreements; failure to comply may amount to "improper behaviour" by the employer, allowing the employee to renege on the agreement.

== Part XI, Redundancy payments ==
Section 135 of the act gives employees a right to redundancy payments. This means when their jobs have become obsolete and employer should compensate them, provided they have become an established employee. The qualifying period for redundancy is having worked for two years with the same employer (s.155). Employees are not entitled to redundancy if they have simply reached retiring age (s.156). And nothing prevents the employer from making a dismissal for misconduct or capability, as outlined under the fairness provisions for dismissal (s.98).

The amount of redundancy is based on a length of service calculation and age. For each year an employee has worked while they were under 21 years old, the employee gets half a week's pay. For each year between ages 21 and 40, one week's pay. For each year over 40, one and a half week's pay (s.162). However, there is an upper limit set on what can be considered a week's pay, which is approximately the same as a week on the minimum wage (if an employee was made redundant on or before 31 January 2011, it was £380 per week – from 1 February 2011 to 31 January 2012, it was £400 – currently it is £508, before tax).

== Part XII, Employer insolvency ==
This right, under section 182, to compensation for lost earnings is for when the employer goes broke. It applies in the unlucky cases where an employer has gone bankrupt or insolvent and there is no money left to pay the staff, who have outstanding pay cheques. The Secretary of State, on behalf of the government, guarantees pay up to a certain maximum, to replace what was lost.

== Part XIII, Miscellaneous ==
=== Repealed enactments ===
Section 242 of the act repealed 60 enactments and revoked 7 instruments, listed in parts I and II of schedule 3 to the act, respectively.

Part I
Citation	Short title	Extent of repeal
1963 c. 2	Betting, Gaming and Lotteries Act 1963	Section 31A. In Schedule 5A, paragraphs 1 to 20 and 22.
1969 c. 48	Post Office Act 1969	In Schedule 9, paragraph 33.
1971 c. 11	Atomic Energy Authority Act 1971	Section 10(1).
1976 c. 74	Race Relations Act 1976	In Schedule 2, in paragraph 11, in sub-paragraph (1), the words "and the following" and sub-paragraphs (2), (3) and (5) and paragraphs 12 and 13.
1978 c. 44	Employment Protection (Consolidation) Act 1978	Sections 1 to 6. Sections 8 to 22C. Sections 29 to 47. Sections 49 to 57A. Sections 59 to 61. Sections 63 to 93. Section 96. Sections 98 to 102. Sections 106 to 108. Sections 110 to 112. Sections 114 to 120. Section 122. Sections 124 to 127. Section 129. Section 137. Section 138(1) to (6), (7)(a) to (d) and (f) and (8). Section 139(1)(a) to (c) and (e) and (2) to (9). Section 139A(1), (2), (3)(b) and (4) to (6). Sections 140 to 142. Section 144. Section 146. Section 146A. Sections 148 to 160. Schedules 1 to 4. Schedule 7. Schedule 8. Schedules 12 to 17.
1980 c. 20	Education Act 1980	In Schedule 1, paragraph 30.
1980 c. 42	Employment Act 1980	Section 6. Section 8(2). Section 9. Sections 12 to 14. Section 20. Section 21. In Schedule 1, paragraphs 1, 8, 11, 13, 20, 22, 23, 25, 31 and 33. Schedule 2.
1980 c. 43	Magistrates' Courts Act 1980	In Schedule 7, paragraph 175.
1980 c. 48	Finance Act 1980	In Schedule 19, paragraph 5(4).
1981 c. 64	New Towns Act 1981	Section 54(6).
1982 c. 16	Civil Aviation Act 1982	In Schedule 3, paragraphs 6 and 8(1).
1982 c. 23	Oil and Gas (Enterprise) Act 1982	In Schedule 3, paragraph 40.
1982 c. 24	Social Security and Housing Benefits Act 1982	In Schedule 2, paragraph 13.
1982 c. 46	Employment Act 1982	Section 20. Section 21(1) and (3). In Schedule 2, paragraphs 1 to 5, 6(2), (4) and (5), 7(1) and (2) and 9. In Schedule 3, in Part I, paragraphs 1, 2, 4 and 6 and, in Part II, paragraphs 15, 21 to 23, 25, 26, 27(1) and 28 to 30. Schedule 4.
1983 c. 23	Water Act 1983	In Schedule 2, in Part I, paragraph 8(1)(b).
1983 c. 41	Health and Social Services and Social Security Adjudications Act 1983	In Schedule 9, in Part I, paragraph 25.
1984 c. 36	Mental Health (Scotland) Act 1984	Section 126(2)(c).
1985 c. 17	Reserve Forces (Safeguard of Employment) Act 1985	In Schedule 4, paragraph 6.
1985 c. 51	Local Government Act 1985	In section 53, subsection (5) and, in subsection (6), the words "Except as provided in subsection (5) above" and "a redundancy payment under Part VI of the said Act of 1978 or to". Section 55(3) to (5). Section 59(1) to (3).
1985 c. 65	Insolvency Act 1985	Section 218. In Schedule 8, paragraph 31(1), (2) and (5).
1985 c. 66	Bankruptcy (Scotland) Act 1985	In Schedule 7, in Part I, paragraph 14(1), (2) and (4).
1985 c. 71	Housing (Consequential Provisions) Act 1985	In Schedule 4, paragraph 7(2)(a).
1986 c. 45	Insolvency Act 1986	In Schedule 14, the entries relating to the Employment Protection (Consolidation) Act 1978.
1986 c. 47	Legal Aid (Scotland) Act 1986	In Schedule 1, in paragraph 10(2)(a), the words "Part VI of the Employment Protection (Consolidation) Act 1978 shall not apply to him and".
1986 c. 48	Wages Act 1986	Sections 1 to 11. Sections 28 to 33. Schedule 1. In Schedule 4, paragraph 4. Schedule 5. In Schedule 6, paragraph 10.
1986 c. 50	Social Security Act 1986	In Schedule 10, in Part IV, paragraphs 76 and 81.
1986 c. 59	Sex Discrimination Act 1986	Section 3.
1987 c. 26	Housing (Scotland) Act 1987	In Schedule 22, in Part II, paragraph 10(2)(a).
1988 c. 1	Income and Corporation Taxes Act 1988	Section 150(b). In section 579, subsection (2)(a), in subsections (2)(b) and (3)(b) and in subsection (4)(b) as it has effect otherwise than for the purposes of corporation tax, the word "net" and, in subsection (5)(b), the words ", and the full amount of the rebate". Section 580(2).
1988 c. 4	Norfolk and Suffolk Broads Act 1988	In Schedule 6, paragraph 19.
1988 c. 20	Dartford-Thurrock Crossing Act 1988	In Schedule 5, in Part I, paragraph 2(2).
1988 c. 34	Legal Aid Act 1988	In Schedule 7, in paragraph 7(3), the words "Part VI of the Employment Protection (Consolidation) Act 1978 shall not apply to him and".
1988 c. 40	Education Reform Act 1988	In section 173, subsection (6) and, in subsection (7), the words "Except as provided in subsection (6) above" and "a redundancy payment under Part VI of the Act of 1978 mentioned above or to". Section 175(3) to (5). Section 178(1) and (2). In Schedule 12, in Part I, paragraph 23 and, in Part III, paragraph 80.
1988 c. 43	Housing (Scotland) Act 1988	In Schedule 1, in paragraph 12(2), the words "Part VI of the Employment Protection (Consolidation) Act 1978 shall not apply to him and".
1988 c. 50	Housing Act 1988	In Schedule 5, in paragraph 10(2), the words "Part VI of the Employment Protection (Consolidation) Act 1978 shall not apply to him and".
1989 c. 13	Dock Work Act 1989	Section 6(2). Section 7(4). In Schedule 2, paragraphs 6 and 7.
1989 c. 15	Water Act 1989	In section 194(7)(d), the words "and the Employment Protection (Consolidation) Act 1978". In Schedule 25, paragraph 56.
1989 c. 29	Electricity Act 1989	Section 56(2).
1989 c. 38	Employment Act 1989	Sections 15 to 18. Section 19(1). In section 27(1), the words "and 16 to 19". In section 29(1), the definition of "the 1978 Act". Section 30(3)(f). In Schedule 6, paragraphs 21 to 25. In Schedule 9, paragraphs 3 to 5.
1989 c. 39	Self-Governing Schools etc. (Scotland) Act 1989	In Schedule 10, paragraph 7.
1990 c. 19	National Health Service and Community Care Act 1990	In Schedule 9, paragraph 20.
1990 c. 35	Enterprise and New Towns (Scotland) Act 1990	In Schedule 1, in paragraph 17(2), the words "Part VI of the said Act of 1978 shall not apply to him and".
1990 c. 38	Employment Act 1990	Section 13(1), (2) and (4). Section 16. In section 17, subsection (1) and, in subsection (2), the words "Apart from this section,". In Schedule 2, paragraph 1(1) and (3) to (6). Schedule 3.
1990 c. 43	Environmental Protection Act 1990	In Schedule 10, in paragraph 16, the words "Part VI of the Employment Protection (Consolidation) Act 1978 shall not apply to him and".
1991 c. 28	Natural Heritage (Scotland) Act 1991	In Schedule 4, in paragraph 5, the words "Part VI of the Employment Protection (Consolidation) Act 1978 shall not apply to him and".
1992 c. 6	Social Security (Consequential Provisions) Act 1992	In Schedule 2, paragraphs 51 and 74.
1992 c. 13	Further and Higher Education Act 1992	In Schedule 8, in Part II, paragraph 89.
1992 c. 37	Further and Higher Education (Scotland) Act 1992	In Schedule 9, paragraph 6.
1992 c. 52	Trade Union and Labour Relations (Consolidation) Act 1992	In Schedule 2, paragraphs 11 to 14, 16 to 18, 21 to 23, 29(2), 30, 33 and 34(1) and (2).
1993 c. 19	Trade Union Reform and Employment Rights Act 1993	Sections 23 to 26. Sections 28 to 31. In section 39, subsection (1) and, in subsection (2), the words ", the Wages Act 1986". Section 54(2)(a) to (e). Schedules 2 to 5. In Schedule 6, paragraph 3. In Schedule 7, paragraphs 2 to 5, 11, 13, 14 and 16. In Schedule 8, paragraphs 10 to 18, 21 to 27, 31, 32, 35 to 37 and 67. In Schedule 9, paragraph 3.
1993 c. 48	Pension Schemes Act 1993	Section 164(6). In Schedule 8, paragraphs 11(1) and 45(a).
1994 c. 10	Race Relations (Remedies) Act 1994	Section 1(2).
1994 c. 18	Social Security (Incapacity for Work) Act 1994	In Schedule 1, in Part II, paragraph 54.
1994 c. 20	Sunday Trading Act 1994	In Schedule 4, paragraphs 1 to 20 and 22.
1994 c. 40	Deregulation and Contracting Out Act 1994	Section 20(3) and (5). Section 36(1). Schedule 8.
1995 c. 17	Health Authorities Act 1995	In Schedule 1, paragraph 103.
1995 c. 25	Environment Act 1995	In Schedule 7, in paragraph 11(3), the words from the beginning to "but".
1995 c. 26	Pensions Act 1995	Sections 42 to 46. In Schedule 3, paragraphs 1 to 7 and 10.
1995 c. 50	Disability Discrimination Act 1995	In Schedule 6, paragraph 3.
1996 c. 14	Reserve Forces Act 1996	In Schedule 10, paragraph 17.

Part II
Citation	Title	Extent of revocation
SI 1983/624	Insolvency of Employer (Excluded Classes) Regulations 1983	The whole instrument.
SI 1993/2798	Sex Discrimination and Equal Pay (Remedies) Regulations 1993	In the Schedule, in paragraph 1, the entry relating to the Employment Protection (Consolidation) Act 1978 and paragraph 2.
SI 1995/31	Employment Protection (Part-time Employees) Regulations 1995	The whole instrument.
SI 1995/278	Insolvency of Employer (Excluded Classes) Regulations 1995	The whole instrument.
SI 1995/2587	Collective Redundancies and Transfer of Undertakings (Protection of Employment) (Amendment) Regulations 1995	Regulation 12(1), (2) and (4). Regulation 13(1), (2) and (4) to (6). Regulation 14.
SI 1996/593	Environment Act 1995 (Consequential Amendments) Regulations 1996	In Schedule 1, paragraph 19.
SI 1996/973	Environment Act 1995 (Consequential and Transitional Provisions) (Scotland) Regulations 1996	In the Schedule, paragraph 4.

== Part XIV, Interpretation ==
The most important point about the act is that there is some confusion about whom it covers. Most British people will be covered, but often vulnerable workers are not. Under section 230 of the act the word "employee" is defined to mean somebody with a "contract of employment". This in turn means someone who has a "contract of service". In legal cases since the early 1980s, some judges have placed a restrictive interpretation on what that means. The opposite of a "contract of service" is a "contract for services", and it is meant to draw the line between someone who is working for another, on their account, under their control and someone who is working on their own account, controlling their own work. In other words, it is meant to be the difference between the truly "employed" and the "self employed".

In many cases, low paid, vulnerable workers, especially agency workers have been held to fall outside the scope of those rights in the Act which are only for "employees". This is because some judges have taken the view that there was not sufficient "control" or "mutuality of obligation" to establish a contract of employment. What those judges have meant by "mutuality of obligation" is that the terms of the contract, especially an obligation to work or not work at any given time and the promise of work in future, were not reciprocal enough. So in O'Kelly v Trusthouse Forte plc [1983] ICR 728, Sir John Donaldson MR held that some waiters who were hired through an agency to do dinner functions were not "employees" (either of the function hall or the agency) because they did not, technically, have to turn up to work for a shift, and they could be sacked at any time. Sir John Donaldson MR said therefore, that the contract lacked "mutuality" and could not be described as one between an "employee" and "employer". The legal effect was to put them in the same boat as the "self employed" and that they were not covered by the Act. The practical effect was they had no right to fair dismissal and could be sacked for organising a trade union.

But other judges have said other things. In Nethermere (St Neots) Ltd v Gardiner [1984] ICR 612, part-time workers were sewing pockets onto Nethermere company's trousers. The sewing machines were provided and they were paid by the piece. There was disagreement over holiday pay and they were removed. Stephenson LJ decided (at 623) "There must, in my judgment, be an irreducible minimum of obligation on each side to create a contract of service." And what he meant by this was an exchange of wages for work and sufficient control to make establish the employee-employer relationship. He did not use the "mutuality" concept, or if he did, he used it to mean the exchange of wages for work, and no more.

There is considerable debate about where the scope of employment rights really lie. Most people will have a contract of employment, and fall squarely within the "employee" category. But it will not apply to professional self-employed people at the top end of the labour market, and it is uncertain whether it always applies to those working through agencies and those whose jobs make them vulnerable.

== Case law ==
Section 139 of the act was at issue in Murray v Foyle Meats Ltd (1999), where the House of Lords determined that an employee's responsibilities as defined in their employment contract were not at issue when a lawful redundancy procedure was undertaken, but what the employee's actual day-to-day responsibilities are.

Section 20 of the act was at issue in Cairns v Visteon UK Ltd (2007) where the Employment Appeal Tribunal held that an agency worker could not claim unfair dismissal.

== See also ==
- United Kingdom labour law
- United Kingdom agency worker law
- Agency Workers Regulations 2010
