= Unfair dismissal in the United Kingdom =

Unfair dismissal in the United Kingdom is the part of UK labour law that requires fair, just and reasonable treatment by employers in cases where a person's job could be terminated. The Employment Rights Act 1996 regulates this by saying that employees are entitled to a fair reason before being dismissed, based on their capability to do the job, their conduct, whether their position is economically redundant, on grounds of a statute, or some other substantial reason. It is automatically unfair for an employer to dismiss an employee, regardless of length of service, for becoming pregnant, or for having previously asserted certain specified employment rights. Otherwise, an employee must have worked for two years. This means an employer only terminates an employee's job lawfully if the employer follows a fair procedure, acts reasonably and has a fair reason.

The Employment Tribunal will judge the reasonableness of the employer's decision to dismiss on the standard of a "band of reasonable responses" assessing whether the employer's decision was one which falls outside the range of reasonable responses of reasonable employers.

== History ==
In 1968, Lord Donovan led the Royal Commission on Trade Unions and Employers' Associations. This recommended a statutory system of remedies for unfair dismissal. The recommendation was put into the Industrial Relations Act 1971. Exclusive jurisdiction to hear complaints and give remedies was conferred upon the newly created National Industrial Relations Court. The Trade Union and Labour Relations Act 1974 soon replaced the unfair dismissal provisions, as was the National Industrial Relations Court with a system of Industrial Tribunals, since renamed Employment Tribunals. Often a tribunal is composed of one legally qualified Employment Judge (formally a "chairperson") and two lay members, one from an employee friendly background (e.g. from a trade union) and the other from an employer friendly background. However, more recently straightforward claims, such as unlawful deduction from wages claims, are dealt with by an Employment Judge sitting alone. Unfair dismissal rights were recast in the Employment Protection (Consolidation) Act 1978. The present law is found in the Employment Rights Act 1996.

- Ridge v Baldwin [1964] AC 40, Lord Reid propounds the at will employment rule
- Malloch v Aberdeen Corp (No 1) [1971] 1 WLR 1578, on the right to be heard before dismissal

== Dismissal ==
A dismissal may be lawful or wrongful (insufficient notice) at common law. It may or may not involve discrimination under statute. It may be actual (with notice or intention) or constructive (by fundamental breach). It may be fair or unfair under statute. It can be absolutely any combination of these. Accordingly, discrimination, wrongful dismissal and constructive dismissal are best dealt with separately. This article addresses the statutory concept of fairness.

- Wrongful dismissal: in particular, a termination by the employer in breach of the employee's contract of employment (in other words a dismissal without notice, where the employer is obliged to give notice) is described as "wrongful dismissal", and not as unfair dismissal.
- Discrimination: Where an employee has grounds to believe that he or she has been discriminated against in being dismissed, the Equality Act 2010 may apply. (The Equality Act 2010 is a consolidating reform which repeals and replaces the Race Relations Act 1976, the Disability Discrimination Act 1995, the Equal Pay Act 1970 and the Sex Discrimination Act 1975).
- Constructive dismissal: Where the employee resigns or terminates their contract (without notice) due to some action on the part of the employer which would entitle the employee to terminate without notice (whether or not the employee actually gives notice), this is known as constructive dismissal. The normal circumstances in which an employee would be so entitled are in cases of a "fundamental breach of contract" (also known as a "repudiatory breach of contract") by the employer.

== Substantive fairness ==
Assuming the employee has proven dismissal, the first stage is to establish what was the reason for dismissal, e.g. was it a potentially fair reason or an automatically unfair reason. The burden of proof for this is on the employer. If the employer pleads a potentially fair reason, the burden is on him to prove it. As mentioned above, it would have to be capability or qualifications, conduct, redundancy or statutory requirements or "some other substantial reason".

The second stage is to establish whether the dismissal was reasonable, and that means whether the fair reason was sufficient to be also judged as reasonable. Even if the employer proves a fair reason, it often falls over on procedure when the tribunal looks at whether the decision was reasonable.

To be unreasonable though, the employer's conduct would have to be outside the band of reasonable responses of any reasonable employer. Roughly speaking, the conduct is reasonable if some decent employers would have handled it similarly, but unreasonable if no reasonable employer would have handled it the same or the dismissal was not based on an honest and genuine decision on reasonable grounds. The tribunal cannot take account of industrial pressure to sack somebody.

If the employee proves that there could have been a competing reason then the burden shifts back to the employer to prove that their alleged reason was the main one. The reason might not be as the employer said, as they might have been wrong on facts or law, short of evidence, or have been trying to be kind to the employee by dressing up capability as redundancy. The tribunal can decide the reason was different from what either party claims, as long as it gives the parties the chance to change their case. Employers can, at the risk of reducing credibility, plead alternative reasons. Where the dismissal was the employee's fault and he knew it, a fake reason given by the employer does not automatically mean unfairness.

To prove the reason, the employer cannot dredge up what it did not know until after the termination, nor can it blame events that happened after termination, although this could all be relevant to the remedy available, e.g. the compensation could be reduced to as low as nil. The employer can, however, take account of what happens between giving notice and termination.

=== Capability and qualifications ===
Capability is mainly about ability, which can be affected by aptitude or training. Incapability is distinct from disability, where an employer must include and give reasonable adjustments to the disabled person under the Equality Act 2010. Incapability has also been distinguished from misconduct as being "sheer incapability due to an inherent incapacity to function". The underperforming, or unadaptable and inflexible employee could be fairly dismissed on ground of capability. For incompetence, the employer must normally give a warning and time to improve unless it can prove the employee already knew what was required. If the employee could not have improved then that is not necessarily an excuse not to warn and wait, but could justify a reduction in compensation, although any reduction in compensation based on allegations that employment would have come to end anyway are subject to the tribunal asking the parties about the probability. If the employee has long service with no complaints or has just had a good appraisal it will take a while for the employer to prove it has given a fair chance of improvement or it may be impossible to prove incompetence. The employee may blame lack of training. If the employer supervises the remedial period too closely, the employee may claim constructive dismissal through bullying. If the employer issued a final written warning and then gave a long time for improvement, the employee may argue it is stale. The employer ideally needs complaints from customers and staff.

The qualifications ground will be viewed sceptically by tribunals, as if an employee was good enough to employ for two years to give him unfair dismissal rights, a claim that he is suddenly under-qualified may hint at there being another genuine reason, which would make the dismissal unfair on the grounds that the employee never had the chance to respond to the true reason. Unless the law requires the qualification or the employee lied about having it on his CV, this is not a likely ground for success.

Ill health can lead to an employee's incapacity in respect of their employment obligations. Illness is not misconduct so disciplinary procedures are not appropriate means to address employer concerns relating to an employee's ill-health. An employer may be able to end an employment relationship without dismissing an employee where the employee's functionality and capacity to undertake their work has been permanently compromised, however tribunals are wary of cases involving employers claiming to have experienced contractual frustration in preference to making reasonable adjustments required by law and addressing the issues within the framework of existing sickness policies in that organisation.

In the case of long term ill health, the employer should try to get medical reports and consult the employee and then is entitled to decide how long to wait for recovery and whether it can give an alternative job. If the employee does not give access to medical reports and does not accept alternative work the employer must still give a right of appeal against dismissal, even if it looked inevitable.

For intermittent absences the employer should consider alternative work, and whether it cannot reassure itself of a recovery time, factor in the percentage of time absent and the effect on colleagues, warn the employee early on what is required and what will happen if not adhered to and allow representations, and warn the employee when the time has come to stop being absent or lose their job. Because the employer cannot obtain a prognosis for intermittent unrelated absences it can set an acceptable attendance standard and dismiss if it not met.

Any dismissal based on disability that is discriminatory is unlawful. If an illness is a disability (because it hinders the employee in professional life) the employer has to make reasonable adjustments, which might mean sick pay, redistributing work, giving him a vacancy, being flexible in hours, etc. An employer must implement systems that favour the disabled person. For example, a disabled employee must be given priority over other better suited applicants if there is a vacancy for a more suitable job to his disability.

In any event, the employer must take care not to unreasonably sabotage the employee's income protection insurance - there is an implied term that the employer will keep a sick employee on the books to keep his insurance going.

If the employer caused the illness, e.g. a nervous breakdown, it may be less reasonable to dismiss, and the employer could end up liable for more compensation and for a longer time. But any mental illness is dangerous territory for the employer.

Due to Polkey, as with capability, a failure to consult the employee will usually cause an unfair dismissal regardless of whether it would have made any difference - employers cannot just suddenly decide for themselves that an employee is a busted flush.

=== Conduct ===
Conduct is mainly about willingness, which can be failure to use talent through laziness or carelessness, or misbehaviour. In other words, the employee will not do the job. The intransigent type of inflexible employee, or malingerer, could be fairly dismissed on grounds of conduct, capability or SOSR. Misconduct has been distinguished from incapability as being "a failure to exercise to the full such talent as is possessed".

Suspicion of a crime is an example of where the employer need only prove it believed guilt as opposed to the employee being found guilty, although an investigation is still needed, even if the crime is against the disciplinary code, but not until before termination - it can be after notice of dismissal. Acquittal makes no difference. Even being charged is sufficient, as if the CPS have decided guilt on the balance of probabilities then the employer is entitled to that safe harbour. However, the employer cannot dismiss based on the employee's legal troubles without giving him the chance to defend himself. Employers can undermine their claim that the crime made the employee unsuitable by delaying in acting or allowing him to work his notice. A crime only counts if it means the employee is unsuitable for their work - personal dislike of particular crimes do not count. However, the employee could become unsuitable by virtue of being unable to perform thanks to colleagues not accepting his continued employment - the employer may need unsolicited complaints along this line. Even incest can be insufficient to justify dismissal. Dishonesty counts more if the job requires honesty, e.g. involves handling cash, third partys' goods, acting as security guard. For example, a shop worker who is caught shoplifting in another shop cannot be trusted. Hiding a conviction might be grounds, but the problem may be that the employer cannot obtain proof of conviction. Anything less than a prison term of 30 months eventually becomes "spent" after which an employer is not allowed to dismiss for it nor is the employee obliged to disclose. Tribunals may be dubious of dismissals of long serving employees with a clean HR record on grounds of some minor or irrelevant offence years ago.

Imprisonment is not just a pretty good proof of guilt, but can frustrate the contract if for more than a few months, which would bring the contract to an end without the need for procedure or compensation. Being held on remand could justify a short spell of suspension on full pay, but if this is without pay or for too long (more than a few months) it creates a constructive dismissal. The employer may simply be able to say that a court has decided there was sufficient probability of guilt to lock him up and this informed its investigation, justifying dismissal.

An employer can be entitled to dismiss multiple employees where it cannot prove who is guilty or to dismiss only some of those guilty based on blameworthiness. To dismiss several staff for incompetence because the employer does not know which one is the weakest will usually look arbitrary and could easily show lack of an adequate investigation. It could easily be fair though if safety is at risk meaning damage could be done that cannot be put right with money, for example, somebody forgot to bolt a jumbo jet's windscreen back in place and a pilot is sucked out mid-flight.

Summary dismissal may be difficult to justify unless the employee appeared to have been guilty of a clear heinous wrongdoing. Summary dismissal for a first offence can only be fair if gross misconduct, warnings will not work, or the warning was already given. An example of where warnings will not work is where the employee is wedded to a campaign against the employer. Employers need to distinguish between one-off lapses and dishonesty.

Factors in reasonableness can be whether other employees previously guilty of the same were also dismissed, and length of service. The employer might try to add that the employee previously committed acts of the conduct they were dismissed for, to add retroactive cause - this could allow the employee to argue that he was allowed to behave the same in the past and so had a reasonable expectation that he would not suddenly be sacked for the latest instalment of the same conduct, that the misconduct was waived or was even acceptable conduct. If an employer suddenly wishes to start laying down the law, it can but has to start with warnings, and verbal warnings in the past for others will not be enough to justify picking somebody out for dismissal in the future. The employee may argue he was not made aware of the rule. Oral distribution of what should be a memo probably will not be enough. Neither will be telling a union but not staff. If the employer suddenly purports to add a draconian new rule that is not in staff contracts, it may face claims of constructive dismissal. Employers who rely on old unrelated warnings will struggle to prove a new minor offence justifies dismissal. The employer must consider what happened to other employees found guilty of the same and adjust for mitigation.

If the employer blames gross misconduct for summary dismissal, the tribunal may be wary of the risk that misconduct was trumped up to gross misconduct to avoid paying for the notice period. For example, using a company car or phone for personal use may or may not be enough, as dishonesty would need to be proven and even then does not necessarily prove reasonableness. Equally, if the employer complains that the employee has taken to working away from the office, the employee may argue that the employer has acquiesced. Being under the influence of drugs can be grounds, especially if there is a published policy against it, but an odd case of being drunk will not be enough unless it happened to be accompanied by violence or customer complaint. ACAS have published examples of potentially gross misconduct, including dishonesty, violence, bullying, gross insubordination, gross negligence and bringing the employer into disrepute. The last could be caused by conviction of a crime that affects work through bad publicity.

Putting safety at risk could be enough, even just interfering with a safety switch on one machine. So would moonlighting on sick leave. Being a drug addict can be sufficient reason for dismissal. Unprovoked unexpected violence is grounds unless length of service mitigates it - often violence will be provoked by somebody and/or the alleged culprit had a clean record until the outburst or "self-defence".

Downloading porn is sufficient, as is hacking. Misusing the internet depends on how much and how inappropriately, and whether there was a policy in place. If there was no policy in place but the conduct was blatant, the dismissal might be unfair but compensation would be reduced to reflect the employee's fault. Borrowing someone's password to access what the employee is entitled to is not enough.

Refusal to carry out lawful and reasonable instructions can be enough, unless it effectively changes the employee's job description so much that he can claim the instruction was unreasonable or even amounted to constructive dismissal. The more fundamental the instruction the greater the need for the employee to comply, e.g. the employee must work on a different floor in the same building if asked, but failure to take the rubbish out at the traditional time will not cut it without warnings and frequent re-offending.

Even then, a tribunal may suspect that if trivia is being used to dispense with somebody who is presumably useful to the business there must be some hidden agenda. The employee may defeat the allegation by showing that he received conflicting instructions, or if there had been a breach of health and safety he could become a whistleblower making it next to impossible to dismiss him without a settlement.

=== Standard of proof for capability or conduct ===
For capability or conduct, the employer does not have to prove on the balance of probabilities that the employee is incompetent or badly behaved, merely that based on sufficient evidence it honestly believes on reasonable grounds that he is. In the case of conduct, the employer must also base its belief on a reasonable investigation.

So the employer could fall over at any of the three stages of belief, grounds and investigation, for all of which it has the burden of proof. Even then, there is the fourth test for the tribunal to decide, but for neither party to prove, of whether dismissal fell within a reasonable range of responses.

The employer cannot hark back to expired warnings.

=== Redundancy ===
Redundancy is a topic in itself and there are regulations for where over 20 staff are at risk, whereby unions or employee representatives have also to be consulted. There are, however, always minimum requirements for consultation, selection and alternative employment. Redundancy means either the job has gone, the place has gone or the requirement for employees to do work of a particular kind has reduced. It does not necessarily mean the employee's work has reduced, nor does it mean the amount of anyone else's work has reduced - the employer may simply have found an efficiency that allows the same work to be done by fewer staff. A business reorganisation might or might not also be a redundancy - a mere reshuffle is not a redundancy. If the employer honestly believes there is no redundancy then the reason must be something else.

==== Bumping ====
It is established practice that "bumping" may be fair. This means making one employee redundant to save another's job, typically on a last-in-first-out ("LIFO") basis. But the employer has no duty to do so and the bumped employee may succeed in a claim for unfair dismissal.

==== Sham redundancies ====
Employers might want to dress up a redundancy as a business reorganisation to circumvent disciplinary procedure (e.g. right to be accompanied), consultation, paid time off and redundancy payments. Employers may want to save face for both parties where the real ground is conduct that was not addressed in time, capability that is difficult to prove, pregnancy or the hope simply that somebody who does not figure in future plans will grab an enhanced redundancy payment and run. In such a case it will be hard to overturn the employer's claim of redundancy, but a genuine redundancy can still be unfair dismissal. Even if there is a genuine redundancy, the dismissal must be handled fairly.

==== Time off during notice of redundancy ====
An employee given notice of redundancy is entitled to 40% of paid time off for jobseeking or retraining. Combined with unused holiday, the employee may effectively therefore be able to disappear once the clock starts ticking. Any attempt to make it difficult to take holiday or jobseeking opportunities at that vulnerable time may not look like a reasonable employer.

==== Consultation ====
In a redundancy situation the employer must consult those in the "pool" identified at risk and carry out a fair selection. The consultation must start when the employer decides or proposes redundancy - any delay could entitle the employee to compensation for loss of jobseeking time. Depending on size of firm and how many redundancies are proposed, it may need to include ways of avoiding redundancies, saving jobs and mitigating effects of redundancy. It certainly has to be while proposals are formative, give adequate information and time, and give conscientious consideration.

==== Selection ====
The selection used to often hinge on length of service, which could be fair on its own, but as that is now age discrimination it may have to be based on more objective performance measures.

==== Alternative employment ====
The employer should refer the employee to any reasonable alternative employment in the group. Offering a reasonable alternative job which is not taken can defeat a claim for unfair dismissal, but the redundancy payment will still be due unless the job was suitable. The test is whether it is subjectively suitable for the employee, so it is easy for him to prove he did not need to accept it. Confusingly, a "reasonable alternative" is a job the employee could do, whereas a "suitable alternative" tends to be a sub-set of reasonable jobs, meaning one that would be reasonable for him to do. The job will tend not to be suitable if it involves more hours for the same pay, the same hours for less pay, a substantially longer commute (unless the employee refuses to view the location), less status or responsibilities, or insufficient time is given to decide.

==== Misconduct during redundancy notice ====
An employer could avoid a redundancy payment by dismissing for misconduct during the notice period, but only for a repudiatory breach, which effectively means the employee would have acted as if he has torn up the employment contract, e.g. by going on strike, emptying the company safe or punching out the managing director.

==== Dual claim - unfair redundancy ====
If the employee claims redundancy at the same time then the burden of proving redundancy is on the employee. If the claim was for redundancy and not unfair dismissal then the burden would be on the employer to disprove redundancy.

=== Statutory requirements ===
Statutory requirements could, for example, be a lorry driver losing his driving licence. However, although it could be a fair reason, the employer still has to decide reasonably, so automatic sacking may not be the answer - maybe the driver could take a pay cut to help in the office until he gets a new licence. A mistaken belief as to a statutory reason is not grounds, but could be "some other substantial reason" below.

=== "Some other substantial reason" ===
"Some other substantial reason" (SOSR), words taken from section 98 of the Employment Rights Act 1996,

some other substantial reason of a kind such as to justify the dismissal of an employee holding the position which the employee held

, is a "statutory catch-all provision", which employers use to justify a potentially fair dismissal. It is usually a business reorganisation or contract change that the employee refuses to consent to. Despite it looking like a "get out of jail card" for employers, tribunals will be alert to employers using SOSR as a pretext for managing somebody out whose face does not fit. All the employer has to show is a potential good sound business reason.

==== Common law grounds ====
Common law examples are imminent defection to competitor, unreasonable refusal to agree a contract change, going AWOL, repeated complaints of constructive dismissal without resignation, damaging breakdown in relations caused by the employee, threats to resign followed by ambiguous absence, imprisonment, expiry of fixed term and pressure from a customer or supplier. If the breakdown in relations could have been caused by several staff then all must be given warnings and eventually all may have to be dismissed if one culprit cannot fairly be singled out. If a customer demands a dismissal, the impact on the employer of keeping the employee needs to outweigh the impact on the employee of the dismissal. If a supplier demands a dismissal, the employer needs to weigh up the cost of going elsewhere. The employer should always consider a transfer to another department.

==== Statutory grounds ====
Statutory categories are employees drafted in to cover for pregnancy or sickness, and TUPE economic, technical or organisational changes (when a firm is taken over).

==== Changing terms ====
If the employer wants employees to sign a new contract, it might be relevant whether it paid for legal advice or gave time to think, and certainly the issues are wider than just looking at the terms of the new draft contract. To secure consent to a change, the employer needs to pay for it, e.g. using a salary review.

==== Dismissal at the request of a third party ====
Several cases within the jurisdiction of the Employment Appeal Tribunal and elsewhere have looked at the lawfulness of dismissals "at the behest of a third party" such as a major customer of the employer.

Selected Cases:

- Scott Packing & Warehousing Co Ltd. v Paterson, 1978, IRLR 166, established that third party pressure to dismiss could constitute "a substantial reason" for a fair dismissal. Under the Employment Rights Act 1996 and preceding statutes, "some other substantial reason" may be sufficient to render a dismissal "fair".
- Dobie v Burns International Security Services (UK) Ltd: Court of Appeal, 14 May 1984. Dobie worked as a security officer for Burns International Security Services, who provided security at Liverpool Airport, which was at that time operated by Merseyside County Council. The Council had the right of approval of any employee of the company at the airport. There was a complaint about Mr Dobie and as a result the council asked for him to be removed from airport employment. Dobie moved him to a lower-paid position elsewhere in the area, an action which is treated in English law as a dismissal. An Industrial Tribunal (IT, now known as an Employment Tribunal) held that there was a substantial reason justifying dismissal, and by a majority the Employment Appeal Tribunal upheld this decision. However, the Court of Appeal disagreed, stating that in deciding whether Burns had acted reasonably, the tribunal needed to consider whether an injustice had been done to the complainant. The IT had failed to consider this and the Court of Appeal referred the matter back to the Industrial Tribunal.
- Henderson v Connect (South Tyneside) Ltd., 8 September 2009: an employee responsible for driving a school bus was dismissed by his employer at the insistence of a local authority, South Tyneside Council. Allegations of sexual abuse had been made which the appellant denied and for which the police had declined to prosecute. The South Tyneside Safeguarding Children Board had reviewed the case, and its conclusion was that Mr Henderson could no longer work with children. Under the terms of the contract between the Council and the employer, the Council had an absolute right to veto the employment of particular individuals in providing the service. As there were no other roles he could undertake, the employer decided there was no other option but to dismiss him. His appeal was dismissed. The Employment Appeal Tribunal considered the effect of the Dobie ruling but stated that Dobie
  did not mean that an omission expressly to refer to the injustice caused to an employee ... was an error in law, provided that it was apparent that the tribunal had taken that factor into account.
- Bancroft v Interserve (Facilities Management) Ltd., 13 December 2012: Interserve provided a catering service in a bail hostel operated by Lincolnshire Probation Trust. Dobie and Henderson were referred to in this case as the correct basis on which an Employment Tribunal should direct itself when considering whether an employer has "taken all steps to mitigate the injustice caused to a [dismissed employee] removed at the behest of a third party".

== Procedural fairness ==
In addition to having a valid substantive reason to dismiss an employee, for a dismissal to be legal, the employer should be able to show that the procedure followed to dismiss the employee was procedurally fair. The requirement for procedural fairness was introduced by the Lords in Polkey v AE Dayton Services Ltd. In 2002, the Employment Rights Act 1996 was amended to give a statutory basis to procedural fairness—following a public consultation, this was repealed in 2008 and the law reverted to Polkey.

=== Warnings ===
A classic error is not giving the employee warnings, disciplinary rules, details of the allegations, the right of appeal or to be accompanied at a dismissal hearing, alternative employment options before termination subject to the group's size, or the chance to improve. Large employers will be expected to be professional. A re-hearing can rectify an unfair dismissal.

=== Statement of reasons ===
The employee is entitled to receive within 14 days a written statement of reasons for dismissal. The employer can comply by saying anything it believes. A missing, inadequate or untrue statement is itself grounds for a complaint to tribunal. The tribunal can then make its mind up as to the reason for dismissal and will award two weeks' pay for this procedural breach. The employee can use the statement to block the employer from changing the reason in its defence to a claim or to attack its credibility if there is such a change.

=== Investigations ===
Investigations must result in notes being kept and given to the employee. They cannot just consist of uncorroborated anonymous informants; sometimes the employee will be entitled to know his accusers and the accusations, although the employee is not entitled to know everything as long as he knows the accusation. Anonymous accusers are easy to attack anyway as there may be questions around grudges, ability to have seen what they say they saw and how they remember details. An employee is rarely entitled to cross-examine accusers.

A confession could still leave a dismissal unfair if the disciplinary procedure was defective, in fact the employer must always follow a fair procedure before dismissal for misconduct.

If the employee is a trade union official the employer must consult a senior union leader, otherwise unfair dismissal is likely and there may easily be a suspicion that charges were trumped up. If a decision maker is a witness that may make dismissal unfair.

== Remedies ==
Claims of unfair dismissal can only be brought before an employment tribunal. There are strict and very short time limits for claims of unfair dismissal. Normally a claim must be brought within three months of the last day of employment, counting the last day of employment as the first day of the three-month period. This rule is often summarised as "three months less a day". The claim must be lodged using the prescribed form ET1 which can be obtained from the Employment Tribunals Service. Employees may bring such claims themselves, either with or without representation. Solicitors and certain other representatives regulated by the Ministry of Justice may represent employees in Employment Tribunal proceedings. Trade unions may support employees' claims, and independent arbitration and conciliation services may be called upon. Published employment tribunal decisions, including unfair dismissal cases, are publicly searchable through GOV.UK and may also be found in plain-English case summary databases such as LawReporter.

If the tribunal finds unfair dismissal it can order re-instatement (old job back) or re-engagement (new job), and/or compensation.

=== Compensation ===
Compensation mainly consists of a "basic award", calculated in the same way as a statutory redundancy payment and subject to the same limit on a week's pay (£751 for dismissals taking effect on or after 6 April 2026), giving a maximum of £22,530. On top of this a "compensatory award" covers loss of earnings, statutory rights and benefits and expenses, capped at the lower of £123,543 or 52 weeks' gross pay. The cap does not apply where the dismissal is for a health and safety reason or for whistleblowing, and dismissals for reasons such as trade union membership or activities attract a minimum basic award of £9,157. The limits are revised each April. So even in an accidental unfair dismissal, the employer could be ordered to pay up to £146,073.

If the employee adds a claim for breach of contract, up to a further £25,000 could be awarded in the tribunal, taking the total potential compensation to £171,073.

Note that the 'Polkey deduction' principle applies: just because an employee has successfully claimed unfair dismissal does NOT mean that they will receive the full Compensatory award. It may be reduced to reflect the likelihood that there would have been a fair dismissal even if a fair process had been fully followed. On the principle that an employee should not be compensated over and above what is an actual reflection of their loss. The Polkey deduction is so named due to a court case: Polkey v AE Dayton Services Ltd, and was clarified more recently at the 2013 appeal case for Contract Bottling v Cave.

==== Risk factors ====
Mainly though, the compensatory award depends on what the employee earned before it all went wrong, and how long they will take to get back similarly paid work. Factoring in the smaller basic award, the nightmare scenario in a tribunal for the employer is therefore ruining a 41-year-old high flier's career after they have been with them for 20 years.

"Big money" cases tend to be restricted to discrimination, where the tribunal's unfair dismissal cap is lifted, or breach of contract or psychiatric injury, where there is no limit to what can be claimed in court. So a worst-case scenario overall for the employer is not just ruining a high flier's career, but a man doing so by bullying a woman and giving her a nervous breakdown. Compensation tends to roughly double in disability or race discrimination cases, so it can be even worse.

==== Tribunal statistics ====
The reality of tribunals is that the average award of £4,000 does not cover the time and money spent by the employee on the claim, and consequently the employer - who also spends about £5,000 on legal fees - usually merely avoids paying less than it loses on lawyers, publicity, management time and staff penning witness statements and testifying. It is generally in both parties' interests to settle.

The risks of being sucked into a tribunal are real - 40,000 unfair dismissal cases are heard every year. 69% of claims are settled; of the other 31%, 19% are thrown out and 12% win. So claimants may be aware they have an 81% chance of extracting some cash.

31% of cases that proceed to a full hearing result in compensation. The median award is £4,000 and mean is £8,058. Costs are awarded to employers in fewer than 0.2% of cases and to employees in fewer than 0.1% of cases, and average a median of £1,000 and mean of £2,095.

Three quarters of claimants are represented.

==== Factors for & against settling ====
However, the employer may worry that compromising undermines the decision to dismiss and thus the authority of management, or that it would create a precedent for everyone who leaves to demand "a bit extra to go quietly". The employee may simply want his day in court.

The employer may have little economic option but to offer a few months' wages ex gratia to get rid of the nuisance. It often costs that anyway to keep a disgruntled employee whilst working through grievances and disciplinary hearings, sometimes dragged out even longer by sick leave, so two months' wages is not really an "extra" cost. By offering an apology, a good reference, tax-free lump sum and avoidance of the time and cost and risk of losing, the employer may persuade the employee to make a similarly economic decision to drop the claim, sign a compromise agreement and clear his desk. It can be essential that the employee feels the employer has lost - hence the apology and payment. Winning a tribunal case is rarely an economic "win" - the parties being able to move on with their lives and business is more likely to be such an optimum economic outcome.

=== Employer's tactics ===
- The claimant may have named the wrong person as employer and ended up missing the three-month deadline by the time he realises.
- The claimant may not be able to afford a lawyer, whereas the employer may be insured.
- The claimant may have not exhausted the grievance procedure.
- The claimant may have missed the three-month deadline.
- The employer could offer the claimant a new job to try to stop the clock ticking on liability for loss of earnings (not likely to work if unsuitable or amounting to an invitation to work in a hostile environment).
- The claim may on the face of it have little prospect of success, enabling the employer to apply for a pre-hearing review which may result in the claimant having to pay a deposit of up to £1,000. Only one third of such claimants continue their claim. This helps stamp out timewasters or to negotiate a lower settlement, but if used frivolously will simply leave the employer with a claimant who thinks he is on a winner and so will cost more to settle.
- The employer can ask questions in advance via the tribunal, to hopefully expose lacking evidence.
- Whoever calls a witness cannot cross-examine him. So the employer may prefer to sit back and let the claimant call witnesses.
- The employer can offer the claimant a settlement that gives him some of the savings he would make by avoiding recoupment of social security from an award.
- The employer can make a "Calderbank" offer - a without prejudice letter warning that the employer thinks the claim is inflated and that costs will be sought if it wins, and offering a sum to settle, which if the employee fails to beat in his award, entitles the tribunal to consider whether refusal of the offer was unreasonable and therefore costs could be awarded against the employee.
- The employer can offer the claimant a good reference to be agreed in a compromise agreement in return for accepting a relatively small sum to drop the claim.
- The claimant may have failed to mitigate his loss by not jobseeking enough.
- The employee may be unable to bring a claim due to illegality, but the employer will probably come off worst from such allegations. For example, the employee may have no right to work or may be not paying the right tax - the first person to be fined for that will be the employer, and the publicity of hiring illegal workers or implication in tax scams may be scant reward for trying to kill off a small claim.
- Most importantly, the employer might consider the motivation for a claim. Does the employee really think he will win enough money to make it worth the hassle? Or does he want to punish the employer for the way he thinks he was treated. It may be that a without prejudice apology is worth thousands of pounds.

=== Employee's tactics ===
- The employer may have used an employment consultant as opposed to a lawyer, in which case the claimant can demand copies of letters between them, which could devastate the defence.
- The employer may have missed a deadline or omitted a procedural step.
- The claimant can request an order for production of documents from the employer, even confidential ones are fair game - if the employer protests the tribunal can look at them privately to decide whether to give them to the claimant.
- The claimant can tie up a large proportion of staff with requests for witnesses.

=== Avoiding a tribunal hearing ===
Settlement Agreements

The Settlement Agreement is a new concept that replaces the former "Compromise Agreement". Section 111A(2) of the ERA 1996 (as amended) provides for "Pre-termination Negotiations" that are: "any offers made or discussions held, before the termination of the employment in question, vita a view to it being terminated on terms agreed between the employer and the employee".

The new provisions, which came into force on 29 July 2013, allows an employer to seek agreement with an employee for the latter's dismissal, thereby avoiding any risk of tribunal litigation for wrongful or unfair dismissal. The employee is invited to attend a meeting and may bring a companion (a fellow employee or a trade union officer). The employer, having discussed the issues, can make a written offer of termination, and the employee should be given 10 days to consider. The negotiations are confidential and "without prejudice". A Settlement Agreement is enforceable, but the employer is advised to have a "clawback" clause to allow recovery of any termination sums paid should evidence of misdeeds by the employee later arise. The discussions must observe ACAS Code of Practice 4 guidelines on settlement agreements; failure to comply may amount to "improper behaviour" by the employer, allowing the employee to renege on the agreement.

== Conflicts of laws ==
- Serco Ltd v Lawson [2006] UKHL 3, a UK labour law case concerning the jurisdictional application of employment rights.
- Duncombe v Department for Education and Skills [2011] UKSC 36, teachers employed by the British government, under contracts governed by English law, to work in EU schools abroad were protected under ERA 1996 s 94

== See also ==
- Employment Rights Act 1996
- Unfair dismissal
- WorkChoices
- Wrongful dismissal
- Redfearn v United Kingdom [2012] ECHR 1878
- Enterprise and Regulatory Reform Act 2013, Part 2
- Orr v Milton Keynes Council [2011] EWCA Civ 62, Aikens LJ, band of reasonable responses means asking what a "hypothetical reasonable employer" would do
- Turner v East Midlands Trains Ltd [2012] EWCA Civ 1470, Elias LJ the band of reasonable responsible test would be compatible with HRA 1998 s 3 and ECHR article 8, if it had been engaged. It is not Wednesbury unreasonableness
- Christou v Haringey LBC [2013] EWCA Civ 178, Elias LJ dismissal of council workers who were responsible for Baby P not unfair
