= Agricultural Advisory Panel for Wales =

Welsh Government body

- Y Panel Cynghori ar Amaethyddiaeth Cymru

Agency overview
- Type: Executive non-departmental public body
- Jurisdiction: Wales
- Headquarters: County Hall, Llandrindod Wells
- Website: www.gov.wales/agricultural-advisory-panel-wales

The Agricultural Advisory Panel for Wales (Welsh: Y Panel Cynghori ar Amaethyddiaeth Cymru) is an executive non-departmental public body of the Welsh Government which regulates wages for farm workers within Wales.

== History ==
Agricultural Sector (Wales) Act 2014
- Act of the National Assembly for Wales
- National Assembly for Wales
- Long title: An Act of the National Assembly for Wales to make provision in relation to the agricultural sector in Wales; and for connected purposes.
- Citation: 2014 anaw 6
- Territorial extent: Wales

Dates
- Royal assent: 30 July 2014
- Commencement: 30 July 2014
- Expired: ~~30 July 2018~~

Other legislation
- Relates to: Agricultural Sector (Wales) Act 2014 (Continuation of Effect) Order 2018

Status: Current legislation

Text of statute as originally enacted

Text of the Agricultural Sector (Wales) Act 2014 as in force today (including any amendments) within the United Kingdom, from legislation.gov.uk.

Initially, the Agricultural Wages Board (AWB) was responsible for setting minimum wage for farm workers in both England and Wales. however, during the so-called "bonfire of the quangos" by the Cameron–Clegg government, the AWB was one of many governmental bodies abolished by the Enterprise and Regulatory Reform Act 2013.

In August 2013, the Welsh Assembly responded by passing the Agricultural Sector (Wales) Bill in an attempt to maintain a regulatory body within Wales for agricultural wages. Despite the bill passing in the Assembly, it was blocked by then UK Attorney General, Dominic Grieve, who claimed it was not a devolved matter. The dispute went to the Supreme Court, which ruled in favour of the Welsh Assembly. The bill entered into law as the Agricultural Sector (Wales) Act 2014 (anaw 6), and resulted in the creation of the Agricultural Advisory Panel for Wales

== Board composition ==
The Agricultural Wages Board consisted of seven members and was appointed as such:

- 2 nominated by Unite the Union to represent agricultural workers
- 2 nominated by National Farmers' Union and Farmers' Union of Wales to represent employers (one each)
- 3 independent members (including the board chair) appointed by the Welsh Government

== Counterparts ==
Each of the devolved countries in the United Kingdom currently maintains a counterpart to the AAPW:

- the Scottish Government maintains the Scottish Agricultural Wages Board
- the Northern Ireland Executive's DAERA maintains the Agricultural Wages Board for Northern Ireland

== See also ==
- UK labour law
