= Agricultural Wages Board =

UK government body

The Agricultural Wages Board (AWB) was a non-departmental government body which regulated minimum wages for farm workers in England and Wales. The AWB was abolished in the Conservative led government's "bonfire of the quangos" after the Enterprise and Regulatory Reform Act 2013 (ERRA).

== History ==
The Agricultural Wages Board was re-established in 1948, by the Agricultural Wages (Regulation) Act 1947, and empowered by the Agricultural Wages Act 1948, after it had been abolished by the Agriculture Act 1920. The Macdonald ministry had attempted to restore the Board through Agricultural Wages (Regulation) Act 1924.

The AWG was intended to be a leading force in setting a strong minimum wage for farmworkers. Instead often only served as a safety net for the most vunerable workers.

=== Bonfire of the quangos ===
In 2013, during the so-called "bonfire of the quangos" by the Cameron–Clegg government, the AWB was one of many governmental bodies listed to be abolished by the ERRA.

The move was supported by the Conservative Party, and the Liberal Democrats. As well, the National Farmers' Union, which had lobbied against the AWB since its formation, also supported the AWB's abolition.

The move was opposed by Unite the Union, and the Labour Party. Unite's General Secretary Len McCluskey said the AWB's abolition would drive pay down further, at the benefit of supermarkets. Liberal Democrats' Spokesman for Agriculture Andrew George was one of two Lib Dem rebels who voted for a pro-AWB amendment to the ERRA. George described the plans for abolition as regrettable, and stated it would damage the pay and conditions of agricultural workers.

=== Welsh Assembly court case ===
In August that year, the Welsh Assembly passed the Agricultural Sector (Wales) Bill in an attempt to maintain a regulatory body within Wales for agricultural wages. Despite the bill passing in the Assembly, it was blocked by then UK Attorney General, Dominic Grieve, who claimed it was not a devolved matter. The dispute went to the Supreme Court, which ruled in favour of the Welsh Assembly. The bill entered into law as the Agricultural Sector (Wales) Act 2014 (anaw 6), and resulted in the creation of the Agricultural Advisory Panel for Wales.

== Board composition ==
As of 2012, the Agricultural Wages Board consisted of 21 members and was appointed as such:

- 8 nominated by Unite the Union to represent agricultural workers
- 8 nominated by the National Farmers' Union to represent agricultural employers
- 5 independent members (including the board chairman) appointed by the Secretary of State for Environment, Food and Rural Affairs and the Welsh Government

== Counterparts ==
Each of the devolved countries in the United Kingdom currently maintains a counterpart to the AWB:

- the Scottish Government maintains the Scottish Agricultural Wages Board
- the Northern Ireland Executive's DAERA maintains the Agricultural Wages Board for Northern Ireland
- and the Welsh Government maintains the Agricultural Advisory Panel for Wales

== See also ==
- UK labour law
- National Minimum Wage Act 1998
