= Polkey v AE Dayton Services Ltd =

- Court: House of Lords
- Decided: 19 November 1987
- Citations: [1987] UKHL 8, [1988] ICR 142

Case opinions
- Lord Bridge

Keywords
- Unfair dismissal, Polkey deduction

Polkey v AE Dayton Services Ltd [1987] UKHL 8 is a UK labour law case, concerning the law on unfair dismissal.

The phrase Polkey deduction has become a standard concept in UK Employment Tribunals as a result of this and later cases, meaning that even if a Tribunal decides a dismissal was unfair, it must separately decide whether the compensatory award is to be awarded in full, or be reduced by a percentage based on their estimate of the probability that the dismissal would have occurred anyway, even had a fair process been followed.

== Facts ==
Mr Polkey drove a van for 4 years until he was told to come to his manager’s office and informed that he was being made redundant on the spot.

The Tribunal said this was "heartless disregard of the provisions of the code of practice" but recognized that redundancies were necessary. The code of practice concerned was a statutory code then in place under the Employment Protection Act 1975, Schedule 17.

== Judgment ==
Lord Bridge held that on the proper construction of the fairness test in the Employment Protection (Consolidation) Act 1978 (the predecessor to the Employment Rights Act 1996 section 98), it was irrelevant to ask whether a different outcome may have resulted from a proper procedure, and it was not open for a tribunal to ask that. An employer does not act unreasonably if (1) employees who underperform are warned and given an opportunity to improve (2) employees who engage in misconduct are investigated and given a hearing (3) employees who are redundant are given good warning and a consultation with steps to minimise losses. But if the end result would be the same, then this will go to remedy not liability:

If it is held that taking the appropriate steps which the employer failed to take before dismissing the employee would not have affected the outcome, this will often lead to the result that the employee, though unfairly dismissed, will recover no compensation or, in the case of redundancy, no compensation in excess of his redundancy payment... ... An industrial tribunal may conclude, as in the instant case, that the appropriate procedural steps would not have avoided the employee’s dismissal as redundant.

== History ==
Prior to the decision in Polkey, the law set out in the British Labour Pump v Byrne ruling of 1979 was a so-called "no difference" rule. This case established that, where there was a procedural irregularity in an otherwise fair dismissal, but it could be shown that carrying out the proper procedure would have made no difference to the outcome, then the dismissal was considered fair. The Byrne case concerned whether trade union representation would have affected the outcome, and the Employment Appeal Tribunal ruled that the dismissal was unfair. The ruling was therefore technically obiter because the rule was not integral to an "otherwise fair dismissal" in the case concerned.

After the development of a requirement for procedural fairness in dismissal was introduced by Polkey, an attempt was made in 2002 to amend the Employment Rights Act 1996 to add a statutory basis for procedural fairness. In 2008, the government repealed this attempt at statutory codification and reverted to relying on the case law developed in Polkey.

== See also ==
- UK labour law
