= List of acts of the Parliament of the United Kingdom from 1947 =

This is a complete list of acts of the Parliament of the United Kingdom for the year 1947.

Note that the first parliament of the United Kingdom was held in 1801; parliaments between 1707 and 1800 were either parliaments of Great Britain or of Ireland. For acts passed up until 1707, see the list of acts of the Parliament of England and the list of acts of the Parliament of Scotland. For acts passed from 1707 to 1800, see the list of acts of the Parliament of Great Britain. See also the list of acts of the Parliament of Ireland.

For acts of the devolved parliaments and assemblies in the United Kingdom, see the list of acts of the Scottish Parliament, the list of acts of the Northern Ireland Assembly, and the list of acts and measures of Senedd Cymru; see also the list of acts of the Parliament of Northern Ireland.

The number shown after each act's title is its chapter number. Acts passed before 1963 are cited using this number, preceded by the year(s) of the reign during which the relevant parliamentary session was held; thus the Union with Ireland Act 1800 is cited as "39 & 40 Geo. 3. c. 67", meaning the 67th act passed during the session that started in the 39th year of the reign of George III and which finished in the 40th year of that reign. Note that the modern convention is to use Arabic numerals in citations (thus "41 Geo. 3" rather than "41 Geo. III"). Acts of the last session of the Parliament of Great Britain and the first session of the Parliament of the United Kingdom are both cited as "41 Geo. 3". Acts passed from 1963 onwards are simply cited by calendar year and chapter number.

== 10 & 11 Geo. 6 ==
Continuing the second session of the 38th Parliament of the United Kingdom, which met from 12 November 1946 until 20 October 1947.

This session was also traditionally cited as 10 & 11 G. 6.

=== Public general acts ===
Short title	Citation	Royal assent
Long title
Greenwich Hospital Act 1947 (repealed)	10 & 11 Geo. 6. c. 5	18 February 1947
An Act to repeal certain restrictions on the amount of special Greenwich Hospital pensions and of expenditure out of Greenwich Hospital Funds for the education and maintenance of children, and to make further provision for the granting out of those Funds of widows' pensions, children's allowances and gratuities to dependants. (Repealed by Statute Law (Repeals) Act 2008 (c. 12))
Trustee Savings Banks Act 1947 (repealed)	10 & 11 Geo. 6. c. 6	18 February 1947
An Act to make further provision as to the superannuation benefits of officers of trustee savings banks and of the Inspection Committee, and to empower trustee savings banks to make advances for the extension or formation of other such banks. (Repealed by Trustee Savings Banks Act 1954 (2 & 3 Eliz. 2. c. 63))
Pensions (Increase) Act 1947 (repealed)	10 & 11 Geo. 6. c. 7	18 February 1947
An Act to authorise further increases under, and otherwise amend, the Pensions (Increase) Act, 1944, (Note: Pensions (Increase) Act 1944 (7 & 8 Geo. 6. c. 21)) and to continue that Act in force as amended; to authorise further increases under the Pensions (Increase) Act, 1920; (Note: Pensions (Increase) Act 1920 (10 & 11 Geo. 5. c. 36)) and to authorise increases in pensions to which that Act does not apply. (Repealed by Pensions (Increase) Act 1971 (c. 56))
Road Traffic (Driving Licences) Act 1947 (repealed)	10 & 11 Geo. 6. c. 8	18 February 1947
An Act to revoke certain emergency provision as to licences to drive motor vehicles, and make provision with respect to the grant of such licences to persons who have held such licences under the emergency provision; and to amend the law as to the destination of fees in respect of driving tests. (Repealed by Road Traffic Act 1960 (8 & 9 Eliz. 2. c. 16))
Malta (Reconstruction) Act 1947 (repealed)	10 & 11 Geo. 6. c. 9	18 February 1947
An Act to assist the government of Malta to meet their liabilities for war damage and other expenses, and for purposes connected therewith. (Repealed by Statute Law (Repeals) Act 1973 (c. 39))
House of Commons (Redistribution of Seats) Act 1947 (repealed)	10 & 11 Geo. 6. c. 10	18 February 1947
An Act to relax the rules set out in the Third Schedule to the House of Commons (Redistribution of Seats) Act, 1944, (Note: House of Commons (Redistribution of Seats) Act 1944 (7 & 8 Geo. 6. c. 41)) so far as they relate to the application of the electoral quota and, in consequence thereof, to postpone the enumeration date for the purposes of the initial report under section three of that Act. (Repealed by House of Commons (Redistribution of Seats) Act 1949 (12, 13 & 14 Geo. 6. c. 66))
Appellate Jurisdiction Act 1947 (repealed)	10 & 11 Geo. 6. c. 11	11 March 1947
An Act to authorise the appointment of additional Lords of Appeal in Ordinary. (Repealed by Constitutional Reform Act 2005 (c. 4))
Births and Deaths Registration Act 1947 (repealed)	10 & 11 Geo. 6. c. 12	11 March 1947
An Act to provide for an additional type of birth certificate. (Repealed by Births and Deaths Registration Act 1953 (1 & 2 Eliz. 2. c. 20))
County Councils Association Expenses (Amendment) Act 1947 (repealed)	10 & 11 Geo. 6. c. 13	11 March 1947
An Act to alter the maximum annual subscription which county councils may pay to the County Councils Association. (Repealed by Local Government (Financial Provisions) Act 1963 (c. 46))
Exchange Control Act 1947 (repealed)	10 & 11 Geo. 6. c. 14	11 March 1947
An Act to confer powers, and impose duties and restrictions, in relation to gold, currency, payments, securities, debts, and the import, export, transfer and settlement of property, and for purposes connected with the matters aforesaid. (Repealed by Finance Act 1987 (c. 16))
Agricultural Wages (Regulation) Act 1947 (repealed)	10 & 11 Geo. 6. c. 15	11 March 1947
An Act to transfer functions of agricultural wages committees to the Agricultural Wages Board and to the Scottish Agricultural Wages Board; to make further provision as to the fixing, cancelling and varying of minimum rates of agricultural wages, as to learners employed in agriculture, and as to agricultural workers disabled from earning the minimum rate of wages; to remove restrictions on the holidays which may be granted to agricultural workers under the Holidays with Pay Act, 1938; (Note: Holidays with Pay Act 1938 (1 & 2 Geo. 6. c. 70)) to extend the definition of "agriculture" in the enactments relating to the regulation of agricultural wages; and for purposes connected with the matters aforesaid. (Repealed for England and Wales by Agricultural Wages Act 1948 (11 & 12 Geo. 6. c. 47) and for Scotland by Agricultural Wages (Scotland) Act 1949 (12, 13 & 14 Geo. 6. c. 30))
Summer Time Act 1947 (repealed)	10 & 11 Geo. 6. c. 16	11 March 1947
An Act to amend the Summer Time Acts, 1922 (Note: Summer Time Act 1922 (12 & 13 Geo. 5. c. 22)) and 1925. (Note: Summer Time Act 1925 (15 & 16 Geo. 5. c. 64)) (Repealed by Summer Time Act 1972 (c. 6))
Consolidated Fund (No. 1) Act 1947 (repealed)	10 & 11 Geo. 6. c. 17	27 March 1947
An Act to apply certain sums out of the Consolidated Fund to the service of the years ending on the thirty-first day of March, one thousand nine hundred and forty-six, one thousand nine hundred and forty-seven and one thousand nine hundred and Forty-eight. (Repealed by Statute Law Revision Act 1950 (14 Geo. 6. c. 6))
Air Navigation Act 1947 (repealed)	10 & 11 Geo. 6. c. 18	27 March 1947
An Act to provide for giving effect to a Convention on International Civil Aviation (Note: Convention on International Civil Aviation.) signed at Chicago on the seventh day of December, nineteen hundred and forty-four, and to make further provision for the regulation of air navigation; to provide for giving effect to certain provisions of an Interim Agreement on International Civil Aviation so signed; and for purposes connected with the matters aforesaid. (Repealed by Civil Aviation Act 1949 (12, 13 & 14 Geo. 6. c. 67))
Polish Resettlement Act 1947	10 & 11 Geo. 6. c. 19	27 March 1947
An Act to provide for the application of the Royal Warrant as to pensions, etc., for the military forces to certain Polish forces, to enable the Assistance Board to meet the needs of, and to provide accommodation in camps or other establishments for, certain Poles and others associated with Polish forces, to provide for their requirements as respects health and educational services, to provide for making arrangements and meeting expenses in connection with their emigration, to modify as respects the Polish resettlement forces and past members of certain Polish forces provisions relating to the service of aliens in the forces of the Crown, to provide for the discipline and internal administration of certain Polish forces and to affirm the operation up to the passing of this Act of provision previously made therefor, and for purposes connected therewith and consequential thereon.
Dog Racecourse Betting (Temporary Provisions) Act 1947 (repealed)	10 & 11 Geo. 6. c. 20	27 March 1947
An Act to make temporary provision for limiting betting on licensed dog racecourses to Saturdays and certain other days, for varying for those days the restrictions on the number of races on which and the time during which such betting may take place, and for purposes connected therewith. (Repealed by Statute Law Revision Act 1950 (14 Geo. 6. c. 6))
Forestry Act 1947 (repealed)	10 & 11 Geo. 6. c. 21	27 March 1947
An Act to provide for the dedication of land to forestry purposes; for the deduction from compensation of grants made by the Forestry Commissioners in the event of compulsory purchase of the land in respect of which the grants were made; and for the execution on behalf of the Secretary of State of instruments relating to land placed at the disposal of the Forestry Commissioners. (Repealed by Forestry Act 1967 (c. 10))
Civic Restaurants Act 1947	10 & 11 Geo. 6. c. 22	2 April 1947
An Act to empower local authorities to establish and carry on restaurants, and otherwise provide for the supply to the public of meals and refreshments, and for purposes connected with the matters aforesaid. (Repealed for Scotland by Local Government and Planning (Scotland) Act 1982 (c. 43))
Treaties of Peace (Italy, Roumania, Bulgaria, Hungary and Finland) Act 1947	10 & 11 Geo. 6. c. 23	29 April 1947
An Act to provide for carrying into effect Treaties of Peace between His Majesty and certain other Powers.
Naval Forces (Enforcement of Maintenance Liabilities) Act 1947 (repealed)	10 & 11 Geo. 6. c. 24	29 April 1947
An Act to authorise deductions under the Naval and Marine Pay and Pensions Act, 1865, (Note: Naval and Marine Pay and Pensions Act 1865 (28 & 29 Vict. c. 73)) for the maintenance of wives and children; to restrict the discontinuance of allotments of pay; and for purposes connected with the matters aforesaid. (Repealed by Armed Forces Act 2006 (c. 52))
Army and Air Force (Annual) Act 1947 (repealed)	10 & 11 Geo. 6. c. 25	29 April 1947
An Act to provide, during twelve months, for the discipline and regulation of the Army and the Air Force. (Repealed by Statute Law Revision Act 1950 (14 Geo. 6. c. 6) and Revision of the Army and Air Force Acts (Transitional Provisions) Act 1955 (3 & 4 Eliz. 2. c. 20))
Cotton (Centralised Buying) Act 1947 (repealed)	10 & 11 Geo. 6. c. 26	21 May 1947
An Act to make provision for centralised buying, selling and distribution of raw cotton, for the establishment of a Commission for that purpose and for the purpose of research in connection with raw cotton and its manufacture, and for matters connected therewith. (Repealed by Statute Law (Repeals) Act 1973 (c. 39))
National Health Service (Scotland) Act 1947 (repealed)	10 & 11 Geo. 6. c. 27	21 May 1947
An Act to provide for the establishment of a comprehensive health service for Scotland, and for purposes connected therewith. (Repealed by National Health Service (Scotland) Act 1978 (c. 29))
Isle of Man Harbours Act 1947 (repealed)	10 & 11 Geo. 6. c. 28	18 July 1947
An Act to dissolve the Isle of Man Harbour Commissioners and to transfer to a body specified or constituted by Act of Tynwald the functions, property, rights and liabilities of those Commissioners and of His Majesty's Receiver-General for the Isle of Man in his capacity as such. (Repealed by Harbours (Isle of Man) Act 1961 (An Act of Tynwald))
Penicillin Act 1947 (repealed)	10 & 11 Geo. 6. c. 29	18 July 1947
An Act to control the sale and supply of penicillin and certain other substances. (Repealed by Therapeutic Substances Act 1956 (4 & 5 Eliz. 2. c. 25))
Indian Independence Act 1947	10 & 11 Geo. 6. c. 30	18 July 1947
An Act to make provision for the setting up in India of two independent Dominions, to substitute other provisions for certain provisions of the Government of India Act, 1935, (Note: Government of India Act 1935 (26 Geo. 5 & 1 Edw. 8. c. 2)) which apply outside those Dominions, and to provide for other matters consequential on or connected with the setting up of those Dominions.
National Service Act 1947 (repealed)	10 & 11 Geo. 6. c. 31	18 July 1947
An Act to confine the operation of the National Service Acts to male British subjects and to service in the armed forces of the Crown; to make provision as to the terms and conditions of such service and as to the period for which those Acts shall continue in operation; and for purposes connected with the matters aforesaid. (Repealed by National Service Act 1948 (11 & 12 Geo. 6. c. 64))
Agriculture (Emergency Payments) Act 1947 (repealed)	10 & 11 Geo. 6. c. 32	18 July 1947
An Act to authorise the making out of moneys provided by Parliament of acreage payments in respect of crops grown in the year nineteen hundred and forty-seven on land affected by abnormal flooding; to amend the Hill Farming Act, 1946, (Note: Hill Farming Act 1946 (9 & 10 Geo. 6. c. 73)) as respects subsidy payments for sheep; and to authorise the making of advances in respect of such subsidy payments for the years nineteen hundred and forty-eight and nineteen hundred and forty-nine. (Repealed by Statute Law (Repeals) Act 1973 (c. 39))
Foreign Marriage Act 1947	10 & 11 Geo. 6. c. 33	18 July 1947
An Act to amend the Foreign Marriage Act, 1892 (Note: Foreign Marriage Act 1892 (55 & 56 Vict. c. 23)) and for purposes connected therewith.
Trafalgar Estates Act 1947	10 & 11 Geo. 6. c. 34	18 July 1947
An Act to terminate the annuity payable to the holder for the time being of the title of Earl Nelson, and to make further provision as to the Trafalgar Estates.
Finance Act 1947	10 & 11 Geo. 6. c. 35	31 July 1947
An Act to grant certain duties, to alter other duties, and to amend the law relating to the National Debt, the Public Revenue and Savings Banks and to make further provision in connection with Finance.
Education (Exemptions) (Scotland) Act 1947	10 & 11 Geo. 6. c. 36	31 July 1947
An Act to make temporary provision for the exemption of children from attendance at school to enable their employment in ingathering the potato crop.
Northern Ireland Act 1947	10 & 11 Geo. 6. c. 37	31 July 1947
An Act to enlarge the legislative power of the Parliament of Northern Ireland in respect of certain matters and, in connection therewith, to remove doubts regarding the validity of certain laws made by that Parliament; to validate the Fire Services (Emergency Provisions) Act (Northern Ireland), 1942; (Note: Fire Services (Emergency Provisions) Act (Northern Ireland) 1942 (6 & 7 Geo. 6. c. 5 (N.I.))) to apply Part III of the Requisitioned Land and War Works Act, 1945, (Note: Requisitioned Land and War Works Act 1945 (8 & 9 Geo. 6. c. 43)) to Northern Ireland; to extend section two of the Northern Ireland (Miscellaneous Provisions) Act, 1945; (Note: Northern Ireland (Miscellaneous Provisions) Act 1945 (8 & 9 Geo. 6. c. 12)) and for purposes connected with the matters aforesaid.
Probation Officers (Superannuation) Act 1947 (repealed)	10 & 11 Geo. 6. c. 38	31 July 1947
An Act to make fresh provision with respect to the payment of superannuation allowances and gratuities to or in respect of probation officers and certain former probation officers and to make provision with respect to the payment of such allowances and gratuities to or in respect of clerks appointed to assist probation officers in the performance of their duties. (Repealed by Local Government Superannuation Act 1953 (1 & 2 Eliz. 2. c. 25))
Statistics of Trade Act 1947	10 & 11 Geo. 6. c. 39	31 July 1947
An Act to enable certain government departments to obtain more readily the information necessary for the appreciation of economic trends and for the discharge of their functions; to consolidate and amend the law relating to the census of production; to provide for a census of distribution and other services; and for purposes connected with the matters aforesaid.
Industrial Organisation and Development Act 1947	10 & 11 Geo. 6. c. 40	31 July 1947
An Act to provide for the establishment of development councils to exercise functions for improving or developing the service rendered to the community by industries and for other purposes in relation thereto, for making funds available for certain purposes in relation to industries for which there is no development council, for the disposal of any surplus of funds levied under emergency provision for encouragement of exports, for the making of grants to bodies established for the improvement of design, and for purposes connected therewith and consequential thereon.
Fire Services Act 1947 (repealed)	10 & 11 Geo. 6. c. 41	31 July 1947
An Act to make further provision for fire services in Great Britain; to transfer fire-fighting functions from the National Fire Service to fire brigades maintained by the councils of counties and county boroughs; to provide for the combination of areas for fire service purposes; to make further provision for pensions and other awards in respect of persons employed in connection with the provision of fire services; and for purposes connected with the matters aforesaid. (Repealed for England and Wales by Fire and Rescue Services Act 2004 (c. 21) and for Scotland by Fire (Scotland) Act 2005 (asp 5))
Acquisition of Land (Authorisation Procedure) (Scotland) Act 1947	10 & 11 Geo. 6. c. 42	31 July 1947
An Act to re-enact in the form in which they apply to Scotland the provisions of the Acquisition of Land (Authorisation Procedure) Act, 1946. (Note: Acquisition of Land (Authorisation Procedure) Act 1946 (9 & 10 Geo. 6. c. 49))
Local Government (Scotland) Act 1947	10 & 11 Geo. 6. c. 43	31 July 1947
An Act to consolidate with amendments the enactments relating to authorities for the purposes of local government in Scotland.
Crown Proceedings Act 1947	10 & 11 Geo. 6. c. 44	31 July 1947
An Act to amend the law relating to the civil liabilities and rights of the Crown and to civil proceedings by and against the Crown, to amend the law relating to the civil liabilities of persons other than the Crown in certain cases involving the affairs or property of the Crown, and for purposes connected with the matters aforesaid.
Public Offices (Site) Act 1947	10 & 11 Geo. 6. c. 45	31 July 1947
An Act to make provision for the acquisition of a site for public offices in Westminster, to amend the Westminster Hospital Act, 1913, (Note: Westminster Hospital Act 1913 (3 & 4 Geo. 5. c. cxiv)) and for purposes connected with the matters aforesaid.
Wellington Museum Act 1947	10 & 11 Geo. 6. c. 46	31 July 1947
An Act to transfer to the Crown Apsley House and the site, forecourt and garden thereof and certain chattels formerly belonging to the first Duke of Wellington; to provide for the use of Apsley House partly as a museum for the preservation and exhibition of the said chattels and other chattels associated with the said first Duke or his times and for other public purposes, and partly as a residence for the Dukes of Wellington; to amend the enactments relating to the Wellington estates, so as to provide for the automatic devolution of the property subject to the trusts thereof whenever there is a change in the person holding office as First Lord of the Treasury, Chancellor of the Exchequer or Speaker of the House of Commons; and for purposes connected with the matters aforesaid.
Companies Act 1947	10 & 11 Geo. 6. c. 47	6 August 1947
An Act to amend the law relating to companies and unit trusts and to dealing in securities, and in connection therewith to amend the law of bankruptcy and the law relating to the registration of business names.
Agriculture Act 1947	10 & 11 Geo. 6. c. 48	6 August 1947
An Act to make further provision for agriculture.
Transport Act 1947 (repealed)	10 & 11 Geo. 6. c. 49	6 August 1947
An Act to provide for the establishment of a British Transport Commission concerned with transport and certain other related matters, to specify their powers and duties, to provide for the transfer to them of undertakings, parts of undertakings, property, rights, obligations and liabilities, to amend the law relating to transport, inland waterways, harbours and port facilities, to make certain consequential provision as to income tax, to make provision as to pensions and gratuities in the case of certain persons who become officers of the Minister of Transport, and for purposes connected with the matters aforesaid. (Repealed by Local Government Act 1948 (11 & 12 Geo. 6. c. 26), Transport Act 1953 (1 & 2 Eliz. 2. c. 13), Post Office Act 1953 (1 & 2 Eliz. 2. c. 36), Road Traffic Act 1956 (4 & 5 Eliz. 2. c. 67), Statute Law Revision Act 1960 (8 & 9 Eliz. 2. c. 56), Road Traffic Act 1960 (8 & 9 Eliz. 2. c. 16), Transport Act 1962 (10 & 11 Eliz. 2. c. 46), Transport Act 1968 (c. 73) and Statute Law (Repeals) Act 1974 (c. 22))
Isle of Man (Customs) Act 1947 (repealed)	10 & 11 Geo. 6. c. 50	6 August 1947
An Act to amend the law with respect to customs in the Isle of Man. (Repealed for the Isle of Man by Customs and Excise etc. Order 1976 (GC No 1/76))
Town and Country Planning Act 1947 or the Green Belt Act 1947 (repealed)	10 & 11 Geo. 6. c. 51	6 August 1947
An Act to make fresh provision for planning the development and use of land, for the grant of permission to develop land and for other powers of control over the use of land; to confer on public authorities additional powers in respect of the acquisition and development of land for planning and other purposes, and to amend the law relating to compensation in respect of the compulsory acquisition of land; to provide for payments out of central funds in respect of depreciation occasioned by planning restrictions; to secure the recovery for the benefit of the community of development charges in respect of certain new development; to provide for the payment of grants out of central funds in respect of expenses of local authorities in connection with the matters aforesaid; and for purposes connected with the matters aforesaid. (Repealed by Planning (Consequential Provisions) Act 1990 (c. 11))
Appropriation Act 1947 (repealed)	10 & 11 Geo. 6. c. 52	13 August 1947
An Act to apply a sum out of the Consolidated Fund to the service of the year ending on the thirty-first day of March, one thousand nine hundred and forty-eight, and to appropriate the Supplies granted in this Session of Parliament. (Repealed by Statute Law Revision Act 1950 (14 Geo. 6. c. 6))
Town and Country Planning (Scotland) Act 1947	10 & 11 Geo. 6. c. 53	13 August 1947
An Act to make fresh provision with respect to Scotland for planning the development and use of land, for the grant of permission to develop land and for other powers of control over the use of land; to confer on public authorities additional powers in respect of the acquisition and development of land for planning and other purposes, and to amend the law relating to compensation in respect of the compulsory acquisition of land; to provide for payments out of central funds in respect of depreciation occasioned by planning restrictions; to secure the recovery for the benefit of the community of development charges in respect of certain new development; to provide for the payment of grants out of central funds in respect of expenses of local planning authorities in connection with the matters aforesaid; and for purposes connected with the matters aforesaid.
Electricity Act 1947	10 & 11 Geo. 6. c. 54	13 August 1947
An Act to provide for the establishment of a British Electricity Authority and Area Electricity Boards and for the exercise and performance by that Authority and those Boards and the North of Scotland Hydro-Electric Board of functions relating to the supply of electricity and certain other matters; for the transfer to the said Authority or any such Board as aforesaid of property, rights, obligations and liabilities of electricity undertakers and other bodies; to amend the law relating to the supply of electricity; to make certain consequential provision as to income tax; and for purposes connected with the matters aforesaid.
Supplies and Services (Extended Purposes) Act 1947 (repealed)	10 & 11 Geo. 6. c. 55	13 August 1947
An Act to extend the purposes of the Supplies and Services (Transitional Powers) Act, 1945. (Note: Supplies and Services (Transitional Powers) Act 1945 (9 & 10 Geo. 6. c. 10)) (Repealed by Emergency Laws (Repeal) Act 1959 (7 & 8 Eliz. 2. c. 19))

=== Local acts ===
Short title	Citation	Royal assent
Long title
Forth Road Bridge Order Confirmation Act 1947	10 & 11 Geo. 6. c. iv	29 April 1947
An Act to confirm a Provisional Order under the Private Legislation Procedure (Scotland) Act 1936 (Note: Private Legislation Procedure (Scotland) Act 1936 (26 Geo. 5 & 1 Edw. 8. c. 52)) relating to Forth Road Bridge.
	Forth Road Bridge Order 1947 Provisional Order to provide for the construction and maintenance of a road bridge across the Firth of Forth at Queensferry with approach roads in connection therewith to establish a Joint Board for that purpose to make provision for the abandonment of the existing ferry of the London and North Eastern Railway Company between North Queensferry and South Queensferry and for other purposes.	
Cotton Industry War Memorial Trust Act 1947	10 & 11 Geo. 6. c. v	21 May 1947
An Act to constitute the Cotton Industry War Memorial Trust and to make provision with respect to its property and funds to incorporate the governing body of the Cotton Industry War Memorial Trust to revoke the deed of trust made by the Cotton Control Board by James Stanley Addison esquire then described as of Št. James's Buildings Oxford Street in the city of Manchester a member of the said board and the Board of Trade relating to the Cotton Trade War Memorial Fund and for other purposes.
Havant and Waterloo Urban District Council Act 1947	10 & 11 Geo. 6. c. vi	18 July 1947
An Act to authorise the urban district council of Havant and Waterloo to acquire certain foreshore and other lands on Hayling Island to recover improvement rates from the owners of lands benefited by sea defence works to make provision with respect to the development of certain lands on Hayling Island and for other purposes.
Southern Railway Act 1947	10 & 11 Geo. 6. c. vii	18 July 1947
An Act to confirm the diversion and stopping up of certain footpaths and the purchase of certain lands by the Southern Railway Company to extend the time for the completion of certain works and the compulsory purchase of certain lands to confer further powers on the Company to confer further powers on the East Kent Light Railway Company and for other purposes.
South Metropolitan Gas Act 1947	10 & 11 Geo. 6. c. viii	18 July 1947
An Act to confer further powers upon the South Metropolitan Gas Company and for other purposes.
South-West Middlesex Crematorium Act 1947	10 & 11 Geo. 6. c. ix	18 July 1947
An Act to constitute a joint board comprising representatives of the mayor aldermen and burgesses of the boroughs of Heston and Isleworth Southall and Twickenham and the urban district councils of Feltham and Sunbury-on-Thames to authorise the Board to provide and maintain a crematorium and for other purposes.
Felixstowe Urban District Council Act 1947	10 & 11 Geo. 6. c. x	18 July 1947
An Act to confer further powers on the Council in regard to their electricity undertaking lands and other matters to make further and better provision for the improvement health and local government of their district and for other purposes.
Nottinghamshire and Derbyshire Traction Act 1947 (repealed)	10 & 11 Geo. 6. c. xi	18 July 1947
An Act to confer further powers upon the Nottinghamshire and Derbyshire Traction Company and for other purposes. (Repealed by Statute Law (Repeals) Act 1995 (c. 44))
Wear Navigation and Sunderland Dock Act 1947 (repealed)	10 & 11 Geo. 6. c. xii	18 July 1947
An Act to provide for the continuation of certain persons in office as elected members of the River Wear Commissioners and the retirement from office of those persons and the election of new Commissioners in their stead to make temporary provisions as to the election and term of office of co-opted members and of a chairman and a vice-chairman of the said Commissioners and for other: purposes. (Repealed by Sunderland Corporation Act 1972 (c. xxiii))
Swindon Corporation Act 1947	10 & 11 Geo. 6. c. xiii	18 July 1947
An Act to confer further powers upon the mayor aldermen and burgesses of the borough of Swindon in regard to lands and to make further and better provision in reference to the improvement health local government and finances of the borough and for other purposes.
Luton Corporation Act 1947 (repealed)	10 & 11 Geo. 6. c. xiv	18 July 1947
An Act to confer further powers upon the mayor aldermen and burgesses of the borough of Luton with reference to the repairing of private streets and for other purposes. (Repealed by Luton Borough Council Act 1985 (c. xi))
Felixstowe Pier Act 1947	10 & 11 Geo. 6. c. xv	18 July 1947
An Act to validate past sales of the Felixstowe Pier undertaking to authorise future sales thereof to make further provision for the finance of the said undertaking to provide for the revision of the authorised rates and for other purposes.
London County Council (Money) Act 1947 (repealed)	10 & 11 Geo. 6. c. xvi	18 July 1947
An Act to regulate the expenditure on capital account and lending of money by the London County Council during the financial period from the first day of April one thousand nine hundred and forty-seven to the thirtieth day of September one thousand nine hundred and forty-eight and for other purposes. (Repealed by London County Council (Loans) Act 1955 (4 & 5 Eliz. 2. c. xxvi))
Dundee Corporation Order Confirmation Act 1947 (repealed)	10 & 11 Geo. 6. c. xvii	31 July 1947
An Act to confirm a Provisional Order under the Private Legislation Procedure (Scotland) Act 1936 relating to Dundee Corporation. (Repealed by Dundee Corporation (Consolidated Powers) Order Confirmation Act 1957 (6 & 7 Eliz. 2. c. iv))
	Dundee Corporation Order 1947 Provisional Order to alter the designation of the lord provost magistrates and councillors of the city and royal burgh of Dundee to empower the Corporation to acquire lands and construct a sewer work to make provision with respect to the art galleries museums and public libraries of the Corporation to authorise the Corporation to borrow further moneys and for other purposes.	
Inverness Burgh Order Confirmation Act 1947	10 & 11 Geo. 6. c. xviii	31 July 1947
An Act to confirm a Provisional Order under the Private Legislation Procedure (Scotland) Act 1936 relating to Inverness Burgh.
	Inverness Burgh Order 1947 Provisional Order to confer powers on the provost magistrates and councillors of the burgh of Inverness as to the licensing of employment agencies to make provision with respect to the local government and health of the burgh to authorise the said provost magistrates and councillors to borrow money and for other purposes.	
Kingston-upon-Hull Provisional Order Confirmation Act 1947	10 & 11 Geo. 6. c. xix	31 July 1947
An Act to confirm a Provisional Order made by one of His Majesty's Principal Secretaries of State under the Public Health Act 1875 (Note: Public Health Act 1875 (38 & 39 Vict. c. 55)) relating to Kingston-upon-Hull.
	Kingston-upon-Hull Order 1947 Provisional Order made by the Secretary of State under the Kingston-upon-Hull Corporation Act 1907. (Note: Kingston-upon-Hull Corporation Act 1907 (7 Edw. 7. c. cvi))	
Provisional Orders (Marriages) Confirmation Act 1947 (repealed)	10 & 11 Geo. 6. c. xx	31 July 1947
An Act to confirm certain Provisional Orders made by one of His Majesty's Principal Secretaries of State under the Marriages Validity (Provisional Orders) Acts 1905 (Note: Provisional Order (Marriages) Act 1905 (5 Edw. 7. c. 23)) and 1924. (Note: Marriages Validity (Provisional Orders) Act 1924 (14 & 15 Geo. 5. c. 20)) (Repealed by Statute Law (Repeals) Act 1977 (c. 18))
	Dinam Chapel Nantymoel Order.	
	Abbey Church Saint Andrew the Less Order.	
	Church of Saint Joseph Crickhowell Order.	
	Trinity Presbyterian Church Aberdare Order.	
	Durham Road Baptist Church Gateshead Order.	
	Methodist Church Lancing Order.	
	Baptist Chapel Melton Mowbray Order.	
	Saint George's Presbyterian Church Northgate Order.	
	Ebenezer Welsh Baptist Chapel Aberavon Order.	
Ministry of Health Provisional Order Confirmation (Gloucester) Act 1947	10 & 11 Geo. 6. c. xxi	31 July 1947
An Act to confirm a Provisional Order of the Minister of Health relating to the city of Gloucester.
	Gloucester Markets Order 1947 Provisional Order altering amending and partially repealing local Acts.	
Ministry of Health Provisional Order Confirmation (Tunbridge Wells) Act 1947 (repealed)	10 & 11 Geo. 6. c. xxii	31 July 1947
An Act to confirm a provisional order of the Minister of Health relating to the borough of Royal Tunbridge Wells. (Repealed by County of Kent Act 1981 (c. xviii))
	Tunbridge Wells Order 1947 Provisional order altering a local Act. (Note: Tunbridge Wells Corporation Act 1929 (19 & 20 Geo. 5. c. xci))	
Ministry of Health Provisional Order Confirmation (Leeds) Act 1947	10 & 11 Geo. 6. c. xxiii	31 July 1947
An Act to confirm a Provisional Order of the Minister of Health relating to the city of Leeds.
	Leeds Markets Order 1947 Provisional Order altering a local Act (Note: Leeds Corporation (Consolidation) Act 1905 (5 Edw. 7. c. i)) and a Provisional Order.	
Ministry of Health Provisional Order Confirmation (Torquay) Act 1947 (repealed)	10 & 11 Geo. 6. c. xxiv	31 July 1947
An Act to confirm a Provisional Order of the Minister of Health relating to the borough of Torquay. (Repealed by Torbay Corporation Act 1971 (c. xxxiii))
	Torquay Corporation Order 1947 Provisional Order altering a local Act. (Note: Torquay Corporation Act 1923 (13 & 14 Geo. 5. c. cii))	
Brighton Corporation (Trolley Vehicles) Order Confirmation Act 1947 (repealed)	10 & 11 Geo. 6. c. xxv	31 July 1947
An Act to confirm a Provisional Order made by the Minister of Transport under the Brighton Corporation (Transport) Act 1938 (Note: Brighton Corporation (Transport) Act 1938 (1 & 2 Geo. 6. c. lxxxix)) relating to Brighton Corporation trolley vehicles. (Repealed by East Sussex Act 1981 (c. xxv))
	Brighton Corporation (Trolley Vehicles) Order 1947 Order authorising the mayor aldermen and burgesses of the borough of Brighton to provide maintain equip and use trolley vehicles upon additional routes in that borough.	
Mexborough and Swinton Traction (Trolley Vehicles) Order Confirmation Act 1947	10 & 11 Geo. 6. c. xxvi	31 July 1947
An Act to confirm a Provisional Order made by the Minister of Transport under the Mexborough and Swinton Tramways Act 1926 (Note: Mexborough and Swinton Tramways Act 1926 (16 & 17 Geo. 5. c. lxxvi)) relating to Mexborough and Swinton Traction Company's trolley vehicles.
	Mexborough and Swinton Traction (Trolley Vehicles) Order 1947 Order authorising the Mexborough and Swinton Traction Company to use trolley vehicles upon certain routes in the urban districts of Mexborough and Conisbrough in the west riding of the county of York.	
Dudley Corporation Act 1947 (repealed)	10 & 11 Geo. 6. c. xxvii	31 July 1947
An Act to confer further powers upon the mayor aldermen and burgesses of the borough of Dudley with reference to the supply of heat by means of hot water and steam the central collection of house refuse in connection with certain of their housing estates and the acquisition maintenance and use of Dudley Castle to make further provision for the improvement health and local government of the borough and for other purposes. (Repealed by Dudley Corporation Act 1969 (c. liii))
Tendring Hundred Water and Gas Act 1947	10 & 11 Geo. 6. c. xxviii	31 July 1947
An Act to empower the Tendring Hundred Waterworks Company to construct new waterworks and to raise additional capital and for other purposes.
Cheshire and Lancashire County Councils (Runcorn-Widnes Bridge, &c.) Act 1947	10 & 11 Geo. 6. c. xxix	31 July 1947
An Act to empower the county council of the administrative county of the county palatine of Chester and the county council of the administrative county of the county palatine of Lancaster to construct a bridge across the river Mersey and the Manchester Ship Canal between Runcorn and Widnes and approaches to such bridge to provide for the removal of the existing transporter bridge to amend the Lancashire Quarter Sessions Act 1928 (Note: Lancashire Quarter Sessions Act 1928 (18 & 19 Geo. 5. c. xxx)) and the Manchester Division and Borough of Salford (Stipendiary Justices) Act 1878 (Note: Manchester Division and Borough of Salford (Stipendiary Justices) Act 1878 (41 & 42 Vict. c. lv)) and for other purposes.
Hove Corporation Act 1947 (repealed)	10 & 11 Geo. 6. c. xxx	31 July 1947
An Act to provide that certain private enclosures in the borough of Hove shall become public pleasure grounds to confer further powers upon the mayor aldermen and burgesses of that borough to make further and better provision for the health local government and improvement of the borough and for other purposes. (Repealed by East Sussex Act 1981 (c. xxv))
City of London (Tithes) Act 1947	10 & 11 Geo. 6. c. xxxi	31 July 1947
An Act for extinguishing tithes and tithe rates and other payments by way or in lieu of tithes in the city of London and for other purposes.
Sunderland Corporation Act 1947	10 & 11 Geo. 6. c. xxxii	31 July 1947
An Act to empower the mayor aldermen and burgesses of the borough of Sunderland to construct a quay extension and other works to make further provision with reference to the local government of the borough and for other purposes.
Southend-on-Sea Corporation Act 1947	10 & 11 Geo. 6. c. xxxiii	31 July 1947
An Act to empower the mayor aldermen and burgesses of the county borough of Southend-on-Sea to construct sea walls harbours street works and other works to authorise the acquisition of lands for sundry purposes and the development of lands for industrial and other purposes to confer further powers on them in reference to their pier electricity gas water transport and entertainments undertakings and the provision of trolley vehicles to enact provisions relating to houseboats &c. and to make further and better provision in reference to the foreshore and the improvement health local government and finances of the borough and for other purposes.
Helston and Porthleven Water Act 1947	10 & 11 Geo. 6. c. xxxiv	31 July 1947
An Act to confirm the construction of certain works to confer further powers upon the Helston and Porthleven Water Company and for other purposes.
London, Midland and Scottish Railway Act 1947	10 & 11 Geo. 6. c. xxxv	31 July 1947
An Act to empower the London Midland and Scottish Railway Company to construct railways and works and to acquire lands to confer powers upon the Great Northern and London and North Western Joint Committee and for other purposes.
Nottingham Corporation Act 1947	10 & 11 Geo. 6. c. xxxvi	31 July 1947
An Act to authorise the lord mayor aldermen and citizens of the city of Nottingham and county of the same city to construct waterworks and to provide and work trolley vehicles on a further route to make further provision with regard to the water and transport undertakings of the said lord mayor aldermen and citizens to provide for the transfer to them of the yarn and textile testing bureau of the University College of Nottingham to make further financial provision and for other purposes.
Paisley Corporation Order Confirmation Act 1947	10 & 11 Geo. 6. c. xxxvii	6 August 1947
An Act to confirm a Provisional Order under the Private Legislation Procedure (Scotland) Act 1936 relating to Paisley Corporation.
	Paisley Corporation Order 1947 Provisional Order to extend the municipal and police boundaries of the burgh of Paisley in the county of Renfrew to confer further powers on the provost magistrates and councillors of the burgh with respect to streets buildings sewers and other cognate matters and with respect to public health and the general municipal administration of the burgh to authorise them to borrow money and make provision with respect to the finances of the burgh to confer powers with respect to stevedoring at the River Cart Navigation and for other purposes.	
National Trust for Scotland Order Confirmation Act 1947	10 & 11 Geo. 6. c. xxxviii	6 August 1947
An Act to confirm a Provisional Order under the Private Legislation Procedure (Scotland) Act 1936 relating to the National Trust for Scotland.
	National Trust for Scotland Order 1947 Provisional Order to confer further powers upon the National Trust for Scotland for Places of Historic Interest or Natural Beauty.	
Nazeing Wood or Park Act 1947	10 & 11 Geo. 6. c. xxxix	6 August 1947
An Act to provide for the better regulation and management of a piece of ground called Nazeing Wood or Nazeing Park in the parish of Nazeing in the county of Essex and for other purposes.
Borough of Croydon (Rating) Act 1947 (repealed)	10 & 11 Geo. 6. c. xl	6 August 1947
An Act to alter the dates as from which amendments of the valuation list of the borough of Croydon in respect of certain hereditaments in that borough shall take effect. (Repealed by Croydon Corporation Act 1960 (8 & 9 Eliz. 2. c. xl))
Tynemouth Corporation Act 1947	10 & 11 Geo. 6. c. xli	6 August 1947
An Act to empower the mayor aldermen and burgesses of the county borough of Tynemouth to construct waterworks and to acquire lands for those and other purposes to make. further provision with respect to their water undertaking and with respect to the local government and improvement of the borough and for other purposes.
London and North Eastern Railway Act 1947	10 & 11 Geo. 6. c. xlii	6 August 1947
An Act to empower the London and North Eastern Railway Company to construct railways widenings of railways dock and other works and to acquire lands to extend the time for the completion of certain railways and for the compulsory purchase of certain lands to confer further powers on the Company to dissolve the Hull South Bridge Company and for other purposes.
North Cumberland Water Board Act 1947 (repealed)	10 & 11 Geo. 6. c. xliii	13 August 1947
An Act to constitute a joint board consisting of representatives of the county council of the administrative county of Cumberland the urban district councils of Cockermouth Maryport and Penrith and the rural district councils of Border Cockermouth and Penrith to authorise the Board to execute works and to acquire lands and easements and to supply water and for other purposes. (Repealed by North Cumberland Water Board Order 1958 (SI 1958/442))
Newhaven and Seaford Sea Defences Act 1947	10 & 11 Geo. 6. c. xliv	13 August 1947
An Act to alter the constitution of the Commissioners for the Newhaven and Seaford Sea Defence Works to extend their powers for the construction repair and protection of sea defence works to make further and better provision for their finances and for other purposes.
Preston Corporation Act 1947	10 & 11 Geo. 6. c. xlv	13 August 1947
An Act to increase the harbour tolls dock rates and market tolls leviable by the corporation of Preston to confer powers upon the Corporation with reference to the development of certain lands and the acquisition of other lands to make further provision with regard to the water transport electricity and markets undertakings of the Corporation and the health improvement local government and finance of the borough of Preston and for other purposes.
London County Council (General Powers) Act 1947	10 & 11 Geo. 6. c. xlvi	13 August 1947
An Act to confer further powers upon the London County Council and other authorities and for other purposes.
London Passenger Transport Act 1947	10 & 11 Geo. 6. c. xlvii	13 August 1947
An Act to empower the London Passenger Transport Board to construct new works to acquire lands to abandon an unconstructed portion of a work to confer further financial powers on the Whitechapel and Bow Railway Company and for other purposes.

== 11 & 12 Geo. 6 ==
The third session of the 38th Parliament of the United Kingdom, which met from 21 October 1947 until 13 September 1948.

This session was also traditionally cited as 11 & 12 G. 6.

=== Public general acts ===
Short title	Citation	Royal assent
Long title
Expiring Laws Continuance Act 1947 (repealed)	11 & 12 Geo. 6. c. 1	10 December 1947
An Act to continue certain expiring laws. (Repealed by Statute Law Revision Act 1953 (2 & 3 Eliz. 2. c. 5))
Jersey and Guernsey (Financial Provisions) Act 1947	11 & 12 Geo. 6. c. 2	10 December 1947
An Act to authorise the payment out of the Consolidated Fund to the States of Jersey and Guernsey of amounts equal to sums received in respect of Crown revenues accruing in those islands.
Burma Independence Act 1947 (repealed)	11 & 12 Geo. 6. c. 3	10 December 1947
An Act to provide for the independence of Burma as a country not within His Majesty's dominions and not entitled to His Majesty's protection, and for consequential and connected matters. (Repealed by Statute Law (Repeals) Act 1989 (c. 43))
New Zealand Constitution Amendment Act 1947 (repealed)	11 & 12 Geo. 6. c. 4	10 December 1947
An Act to provide for the amendment of the Constitution of New Zealand. (Repealed by Statute Law (Repeals) Act 1989 (c. 43))
Ministers of the Crown (Treasury Secretaries) Act 1947 (repealed)	11 & 12 Geo. 6. c. 5	10 December 1947
An Act to provide for the salary of an Economic Secretary to the Treasury, and to render the holder of that office capable of being elected to, and of sitting and voting in, the House of Commons. (Repealed by Ministers of the Crown Act 1964 (c. 98))
Housing (Temporary Accommodation) Act 1947 (repealed)	11 & 12 Geo. 6. c. 6	10 December 1947
An Act to increase the sums available for defraying expenses incurred by the Minister of Works under section one of the Housing (Temporary Accommodation) Act, 1944. (Note: Housing (Temporary Accommodation) Act 1944 (7 & 8 Geo. 6. c. 36)) (Repealed by National Loans Act 1968 (c. 13))
Ceylon Independence Act 1947 renamed to Sri Lanka Independence Act 1947 (Note: Name of act changed by the Sri Lanka Republic Act 1972 (c. 55).)	11 & 12 Geo. 6. c. 7	10 December 1947
An Act to make provision for, and in connection with, the attainment by Ceylon of fully responsible status within the British Commonwealth of Nations.
Mandated and Trust Territories Act 1947	11 & 12 Geo. 6. c. 8	10 December 1947
An Act to make provision as to the application and modification of enactments in relation to mandates of the League of Nations and the trusteeship system of the United Nations.
Finance (No. 2) Act 1947	11 & 12 Geo. 6. c. 9	18 December 1947
An Act to grant certain duties, to alter other duties and to make certain amendments in the law relating to the Public Revenue.
Emergency Laws (Miscellaneous Provisions) Act 1947	11 & 12 Geo. 6. c. 10	18 December 1947
An Act to make further provision with respect to the Defence Regulations continued in force by the Emergency Laws (Transitional Provisions) Act, 1946, (Note: Emergency Laws (Transitional Provisions) Act 1946 (9 & 10 Geo. 6. c. 26)) and with respect to certain emergency and temporary enactments extended by or contained in that Act; to repeal certain other emergency enactments; and for purposes connected with the matters aforesaid. (Repealed for the Isle of Man by Statute Law Revision (Isle of Man) Act 1991 (c. 61))
Medical Practitioners and Pharmacists Act 1947 (repealed)	11 & 12 Geo. 6. c. 11	18 December 1947
An Act to make provision for the registration as medical practitioners or as pharmacists of certain persons having qualifications other than the United Kingdom qualifications required by the Medical Acts and the Pharmacy Acts, and to repeal certain provisions as to pharmacists in that behalf. (Repealed by Medical Act 1978 (c. 12))
Pensions (Governors of Dominions, &c.) Act 1947 (repealed)	11 & 12 Geo. 6. c. 12	18 December 1947
An Act to amend the Pensions (Governors of Dominions, &c.) Acts, 1911 to 1936. (Repealed by Governors' Pensions Act 1957 (5 & 6 Eliz. 2. c. 62))
Public Works Loans Act 1947 (repealed)	11 & 12 Geo. 6. c. 13	18 December 1947
An Act to grant money for the purpose of certain local loans out of the Local Loans Fund and for other purposes relating to local loans. (Repealed by Public Works Loans Act 1964 (c. 9))

=== Local acts ===
Short title	Citation	Royal assent
Long title
Stornoway Harbour Order Confirmation Act 1947	11 & 12 Geo. 6. c. i	10 December 1947
An Act to confirm a Provisional Order under the Private Legislation Procedure (Scotland) Act 1936 (Note: Private Legislation Procedure (Scotland) Act 1936 (26 Geo. 5 & 1 Edw. 8. c. 52)) relating to Stornoway Harbour.
	Stornoway Harbour Order 1947 Provisional Order to amend the Stornoway Harbour Order 1926 in relation to the constitution of the Stornoway Pier and Harbour Commission and the levying and collection of dues rates and charges to authorise the Commissioners to construct new works and to borrow money and for other purposes.	
Edinburgh Merchant Company Widows' Fund (Amendment) Order Confirmation Act 1947 (repealed)	11 & 12 Geo. 6. c. ii	10 December 1947
An Act to confirm a Provisional Order under the Private Legislation Procedure (Scotland) Act 1936 relating to the Edinburgh Merchant Company Widows' Fund. (Repealed by Edinburgh Merchant Company Order Confirmation Act 1960 (8 & 9 Eliz. 2. c. xix))
	Edinburgh Merchant Company Widows' Fund (Amendment) Order 1947 Provisional Order to amend the provisions of Part III—Widows' Fund—of the Edinburgh Merchant Company Act 1898 (Note: Edinburgh Merchant Company Act 1898 (61 & 62 Vict. c. xxii)) relative to the Trustees of the Widows' Fund of the Company of Merchants of the City of Edinburgh.	
Coatbridge Burgh Extension, &c. Order Confirmation Act 1947	11 & 12 Geo. 6. c. iii	18 December 1947
An Act to confirm a Provisional Order under the Private Legislation Procedure (Scotland) Act 1936 relating to Coatbridge Burgh Extension, &c.
	Coatbridge Burgh Extension, &c. Order 1947 Provisional Order to extend the municipal and police boundaries of the burgh of Coatbridge in the county of Lanark and for other purposes.	

== See also ==
- List of acts of the Parliament of the United Kingdom
