= Agricultural Wages Act 1948 =

Act of the Parliament of the United Kingdom

Agricultural Wages Act 1948 (Note: Section 21(1).)
- Act of Parliament
- Parliament of the United Kingdom
- Long title: An Act to consolidate the Agricultural Wages (Regulation) Acts, 1924 to 1947, and so much of the Holidays with Pay Act, 1938, as enables a wage regulating authority to make provision for holidays and holiday remuneration for workers employed in agriculture in England and Wales.
- Citation: 11 & 12 Geo. 6. c. 47
- Territorial extent: England and Wales (Note: Section 21(2).)

Dates
- Royal assent: 13 July 1948
- Commencement: 13 July 1948 (Note: The Acts of Parliament (Commencement) Act 1793.)
Other legislation
Amends	See § Repealed enactments
Repeals/revokes	See § Repealed enactments
Amended by	Statute Law Revision Act 1950; Transfer of Functions (Ministry of Food) Order 1955; London Government Order 1965; Agricultural Wages Committees (Transitional Provisions) Order 1974; Employment Protection Act 1975; National Minimum Wage Act 1998; Agricultural Wages Act 1948 (Amendment) Regulations 1999; Statute Law (Repeals) Act 2004; Employment Relations Act 2004; Employment Act 2008; Local Government (Structural Changes) (Miscellaneous Amendments and Other Provision) Order 2009; Enterprise and Regulatory Reform Act 2013
Relates to	Agricultural Wages (Scotland) Act 1949

Status: Partially repealed

Text of statute as originally enacted

Revised text of statute as amended

Text of the Agricultural Wages Act 1948 as in force today (including any amendments) within the United Kingdom, from legislation.gov.uk.

The Agricultural Wages Act 1948 (11 & 12 Geo. 6. c. 47) is an act of the Parliament of the United Kingdom that consolidated enactments related to agricultural wages in England and Wales. The Agricultural Wages Board regulated the amount that farm workers were paid under the act, in order to guarantee a fair minimum wage scale, depending, for example, on type of work, or years of experience. After the National Minimum Wage Act 1998 was introduced, agricultural wages tended to be slightly higher than those at the minimum. However, the Conservative-Liberal-Democrat coalition government decided to allow farm worker wages to be reduced by repealing most of the act in the Enterprise and Regulatory Reform Act 2013.

== Provisions ==
=== Repealed enactments ===
Section 20 of the act repealed 3 enactments, listed in the fifth schedule to the act.

Citation	Short title	Extent of repeal
14 & 15 Geo. 5. c. 37	Agricultural Wages (Regulation) Act 1924	The whole act.
1 & 2 Geo. 6. c. 70	Holidays with Pay Act 1938	Sections one, two, three and five so far as they relate to workers employed in agriculture.
10 & 11 Geo. 6. c. 15	Agricultural Wages (Regulation) Act 1947	The whole act.

== Subsequent developments ==
The Enterprise and Regulatory Reform Act 2013 repealed a number of the act's provisions with effect from 25 June 2013, including section 1 (which had established the Agricultural Wages Board for England and Wales) and sections 3 and 4 (which had conferred power on the Board to fix rates of wages and to enforce holiday provisions). Several other provisions remain in force, including section 5 (permits to incapacitated persons), section 11 (avoidance of agreements in contravention of the act) and section 12 (officers).

== See also ==
- Agriculture Act 1920
- Agricultural Wages (Regulation) Act 1924
- Agricultural Wages (Scotland) Act 1949
- Minister of Food (United Kingdom)
- Scottish Agricultural Wages Board
