= Armed Forces Act 1981 =

Act of the Parliament of the United Kingdom

Armed Forces Act 1981 (Note: Section 30.)
- Act of Parliament
- Parliament of the United Kingdom
- Long title: An Act to continue the Army Act 1955, the Air Force Act 1955 and the Naval Discipline Act 1957; to amend those Acts and other enactments relating to the armed forces; to confer new powers for the temporary detention abroad of servicemen or civilians subject to those Acts suffering from mental disorder or the children of service and certain civilian families in need of care or control; to complete the assimilation for statutory purposes of the women's services with the rest of the armed forces; to amend the Patents Act 1977 in relation to inventions by members of the armed forces; to abolish the office of Accountant General of the Navy; to make further provision in relation to the naval prize cash balance; and for connected purposes.
- Citation: 1981 c. 55
- Territorial extent: United Kingdom

Dates
- Royal assent: 28 July 1981
- Commencement: 28 July 1981 (in part) (Note: Section 29(4).)1 November 1981 (section 6) (Note: Section 29(1). The Armed Forces Act 1981 (Commencement No. 1) Order 1981 (SI 1981/1503).); 1 May 1982 (Note: Section 29(1). The Armed Forces Act 1981 (Commencement No. 2) Order 1982 (SI 1982/497).)

Other legislation
- Amends: Pensions Commutation Act 1871; See § Repealed enactments
- Repeals/revokes: See § Repealed enactments
- Amended by: Children (Northern Ireland Consequential Amendments) Order 1995; Armed Forces Act 1996; Reserve Forces Act 1996 (Consequential Provisions etc.) Regulations 1998; Youth Justice and Criminal Evidence Act 1999; Armed Forces Act 2001; Marriage (Northern Ireland) Order 2003; Statute Law (Repeals) Act 2004; Armed Forces Act 2006; Legal Aid, Sentencing and Punishment of Offenders Act 2012

Status: Partially repealed

Text of statute as originally enacted

Revised text of statute as amended

Text of the Armed Forces Act 1981 as in force today (including any amendments) within the United Kingdom, from legislation.gov.uk.

The Armed Forces Act 1981 (c. 55) is an act of the Parliament of the United Kingdom that continued the Army Act 1955 (3 & 4 Eliz. 2. c. 18), the Air Force Act 1955 (3 & 4 Eliz. 2. c. 19) and the Naval Discipline Act 1957 (5 & 6 Eliz. 2. c. 53), and amended enactments relating to the armed forces of the United Kingdom.

== Provisions ==
=== Repealed enactments ===
Section 28(2) of the act repealed 46 enactments, listed in parts I and II of the fifth schedule to the act.

Part I — Repeals consequent on assimilation of Women's Services
Citation	Short title	Extent of repeal
Acts of the Parliament of the United Kingdom
5 & 6 Geo. 6. c. 8	War Orphans Act 1942	In section 1(4), the words "Nursing Service or other"
6 & 7 Geo. 6. c. 39	Pensions Appeal Tribunals Act 1943	In section 12(1), in the definition of "His Majesty's naval, military or air forces" the words "the nursing service and" and "other"
7 & 8 Geo. 6. c. 10	Disabled Persons (Employment) Act 1944	In section 7(1)(c) the words from "or in" to "this Act". In section 16 the words "of the following classes, that is to say (a) men" and paragraph (b) together with the word "and" at the end of paragraph (a). Schedule 1.
10 & 11 Geo. 6. c. 44	Crown Proceedings Act 1947	In section 38, subsection (5).
11 & 12 Geo. 6. c. 21	Army and Air Force (Women's Service) Act 1948	Section 3(1).
12, 13 & 14 Geo. 6. c. 68	Representation of the People Act 1949	In section 46, subsection (2).
12, 13 & 14 Geo. 6. c. 76	Marriage Act 1949	In section 68, in subsection (2), paragraph (d) and subsections (4) and (5). Schedule 3.
14 & 15 Geo. 6. c. 10	Reinstatement in Civil Employment Act 1950	In section 1, paragraph (e). In section 5(2), paragraph (iii) and the words "or paragraph (iii)". In section 8(1), the definition of "the competent naval, military or air force authority" and, in the definition of "service in the armed forces of the Crown", the words following "regular forces".
14 & 15 Geo. 6. c. 65	Reserve and Auxiliary Forces (Protection of Civil Interests) Act 1951	In section 64, subsection (2). In Schedule 1, in paragraph 1, sub-paragraph (v).
3 & 4 Eliz. 2. c. 18	Army Act 1955	In section 225(1), in the definition of "Her Majesty's naval forces", the words from "(which includes" to "those services)".
3 & 4 Eliz. 2. c. 19	Air Force Act 1955	In section 223(1), in the definition of "Her Majesty's naval forces", the words from "(which includes" to "those services)".
1970 c. 10	Income and Corporation Taxes Act 1970	In section 366(3) the following words, namely, "either", "or women serving in any of the capacities mentioned at the end of this subsection", "or women serving in any of the capacities so mentioned" and the list of capacities entitled "women's services". In section 366(4), the words "(whether men or women)".
1970 c. 41	Equal Pay Act 1970	In section 1(9), paragraph (b) and the word "or" immediately preceding it. In section 7(1) the words "or of any women's service administered by the Defence Council" and "or of any such service".
1974 c. 23	Juries Act 1974	In section 9(1), the words "and others". In Schedule 1, in Part III, the words from "the Women's" to "Nursing Service".
1974 c. 46	Friendly Societies Act 1974	In section 108, the words from "(which expression" to "Act)". Schedule 8.
1974 c. 52	Trade Union and Labour Relations Act 1974	In section 30(1), in the definition of "worker", in paragraph (c), the words "or of any women's service administered by the Defence Council".
1975 c. 7	Finance Act 1975	In Schedule 7, in paragraph 1, in sub-paragraph (2) the words "was employed as mentioned in sub-paragraph (3) below or" and the words "and not being so employed" and sub-paragraph (3).
1975 c. 65	Sex Discrimination Act 1975	In section 85, in subsection (4), paragraph (b) and the word "or" immediately preceding it and, in subsection (6), the words "or service" and "(a) or".
1975 c. 71	Employment Protection Act 1975	In section 121(3) the words "or of any women's service administered by the Defence Council".
1976 c. 25	Fair Employment (Northern Ireland) Act 1976	In section 50(4), paragraph (a)(ii) and the immediately preceding "and".
1976 c. 52	Armed Forces Act 1976	In section 4, the words after "effect". In Schedule 9, paragraph 9.
1976 c. 74	Race Relations Act 1976	In section 75(10)(a) the words "(including any women's service administered by the Defence Council)".
1978 c. 44	Employment Protection (Consolidation) Act 1978	In section 138(3), the words "or of any women's service administered by the Defence Council". In Schedule 13, in paragraph 19(3), the words "or of any women's service administered by the Defence Council".
1980 c. 9	Reserve Forces Act 1980	In Schedule 8, paragraph 5(1)(b) and the immediately preceding "and".
Acts of the Parliament of Northern Ireland and instruments relating to Northern Ireland
1945 c. 6 (N.I.)	Disabled Persons (Employment) Act (Northern Ireland) 1945	In section 16, the words "of the following classes, that is to say: (a) men" and paragraph (b) together with the word "and" at the end of paragraph (a). Schedule 1.
1960 c. 4 (N.I.)	Disabled Persons (Employment) Act (Northern Ireland) 1960	Section 4.
1965 c. 19 (N.I.)	Contracts of Employment and Redundancy Payments Act (Northern Ireland) 1965	In Schedule 1, in paragraph 11A(3), the words "or of any women's service administered by the Defence Council".
1967 c. 32 (N.I.)	Marriage (Registration of Buildings) Act (Northern Ireland) 1967	In section 2, in subsection (1), paragraph (d) and subsections (2) and (3). Schedule 1.
1970 c. 32 (N.I.)	Equal Pay Act (Northern Ireland) 1970	In section 1(10) paragraph (b) and the word "or" immediately preceding it.
S.I. 1974/2143 (N.I. 6)	Juries (Northern Ireland) Order 1974	In Schedule 2, in the entry relating to members of the forces the words from "including" to "Council".
S.I. 1976/1042 (N.I. 15)	Sex Discrimination (Northern Ireland) Order 1976	In Article 82, in paragraph (5), sub-paragraph (b) and the word "or" immediately preceding that sub-paragraph and, in paragraph (7), the words "or service" and "(a) or (b)".
S.I. 1976/1043 (N.I. 16)	Industrial Relations (Northern Ireland) Order 1976	In Article 2(2), in the definition of "worker", in sub-paragraph (c), the words "or of any women's service administered by the Defence Council". In Article 79(2) the words "or any women's service administered by the Defence Council".
S.I. 1976/1213 (N.I. 22)	Pharmacy (Northern Ireland) Order 1976	In Article 5, paragraph 5(b) and the preceding "and".
S.I. 1976/2147 (N.I. 28)	Industrial Relations (No. 2) (Northern Ireland) Order 1976	In Article 62(3), the words "or of any women's service administered by the Defence Council".

Part II — Other repeals
Citation	Short title	Extent of repeal
27 & 28 Vict. c. 24	Naval Agency and Distribution Act 1864	In section 17, the words from "and a per-centage" to "by law deducted".
28 & 29 Vict. c. 73	Naval and Marine Pay and Pensions Act 1865	In section 12, the words "shall be published in the London Gazette and".
48 & 49 Vict. c. 42	Greenwich Hospital Act 1885	Section 4.
4 & 5 Geo. 5. c. 83	Army Pensions Act 1914	The whole act (except as mentioned in section 26 of this Act).
21 & 22 Geo. 5. c. 9	Colonial Naval Defence Act 1931	In section 2(1), in paragraph (c), the words from "or of the Royal Naval Volunteer Reserve" to the end and, in the proviso, the words "and the Royal Naval Volunteer Reserve".
12 & 13 Geo. 6. c. 18	Colonial Naval Defence Act 1949	In section 1(4), the words "or of the Royal Naval Volunteer Reserve" and the words from "(and in particular" to the end.
3 & 4 Eliz. 2. c. 18	Army Act 1955	In section 82(2)(b), the words "in special circumstances". Section 99(2). In section 131(2), the words "and the provisions thereof as to the summary dealing with charges". In section 153(3), the words from "the service of the process" to the end. In section 209(3), paragraph (fb). In Schedule 7, in paragraph 6, the words "and so much of Part II as relates to forfeiture of service".
3 & 4 Eliz. 2. c. 19	Air Force Act 1955	In section 82(2)(b), the words "in special circumstances". Section 99(2). In section 131(2), the words "and the provisions thereof as to the summary dealing with charges." In section 153(3), the words from "the service of the process" to the end. In section 209(3), paragraph (fb).
5 & 6 Eliz. 2. c. 53	Naval Discipline Act 1957	In section 51, in subsection (1) the words "this and" and subsection (2). In section 93, the words "death or to". In section 101, subsection (2).
9 & 10 Eliz. 2. c. 52	Army and Air Force Act 1961	Section 24. In section 26, subsection (3).
1963 c. 39	Criminal Justice (Scotland) Act 1963	In section 9, subsections (3) and (4).
1976 c. 52	Armed Forces Act 1976	Section 1. In Schedule 9, paragraph 12.

== Subsequent developments ==
Many provisions of the act were repealed by section 383(2) of, and Schedule 17 to, the Armed Forces Act 2006 (2006 c. 52), with repeals taking effect from 28 March 2009. The sections repealed include sections 2 to 8, 10, 11, 13, 15 to 19, 21, 23, 25 and 27, together with Schedules 1 and 2.
