= Trade Union and Labour Relations Act 1974 =

Act of the Parliament of the United Kingdom

Trade Union and Labour Relations Act 1974 (Note: Section 31.(1))
- Act of Parliament
- Parliament of the United Kingdom
- Long title: An Act to repeal the Industrial Relations Act 1971; to make provision with respect to the law relating to trades union, employers' associations, workers and employers, including the law relating to unfair dismissal, and with respect to the jurisdiction and procedure of industrial tribunals; and for connected purposes.
- Citation: 1974 c. 52
- Territorial extent: England and Wales; Scotland; Northern Ireland (in part); (Note: Section 31(5).)

Dates
- Royal assent: 31 July 1974
- Commencement: 16 September 1974 (Note: Section 31(2)–(4). The Trade Union and Labour Relations Act 1974 (Commencement) Order 1974 (SI 1974/1385).)
- Repealed: 16 October 1992
Other legislation
| Amends | Trade Union Act 1913 |
| Repeals/revokes | Industrial Relations Act 1971 |
| Amended by | House of Commons Disqualification Act 1975; Northern Ireland Assembly Disqualification Act 1975; Trade Union and Labour Relations (Amendment) Act 1976; Administration of Justice Act 1977; Employment Protection (Consolidation) Act 1978; Wages Councils Act 1979; Armed Forces Act 1981 |
| Repealed by | Trade Union and Labour Relations (Consolidation) Act 1992 |
| Relates to | Employment Protection Act 1975; Statute Law (Repeals) Act 1986; Employment Rights Act 1996 |

Status: Repealed

Text of statute as originally enacted

Revised text of statute as amended

The Trade Union and Labour Relations Act 1974 (c. 52) (TULRA) was an act of the Parliament of the United Kingdom on industrial relations.

The act contains rules on the functioning and legal status of trade unions, the presumption that a collective agreement is not binding, and immunity of unions who take strike action in contemplation or furtherance of a trade dispute. Together with the Employment Protection Act 1975, TULRA formed the basis of the Labour Party's employment law programme under the "Social Contract" initiative.

== Background ==
The act was introduced by the Labour Government which succeeded Edward Heath's Conservative administration. TULRA both repealed and replaced the Industrial Relations Act 1971 which had been introduced by Heath's employment minister Robert Carr. The 1971 act had faced massive opposition from the trade unions, whose industrial action contributed to Heath's implementation of the Three-Day Week and ultimately to the defeat of the government.

The victorious Labour Party promptly repealed the Industrial Relations Act 1971, replacing it with their own legislation that was to incorporate the principles within Barbara Castle's 1969 white paper, "In Place of Strife". However, although the Trade Union and Labour Relations Act 1974 scrapped the 1971 act's "offensive" provisions, it nevertheless effectively re-enacted the remaining bulk of Carr's statute.

== Subsequent developments ==
The whole act was repealed by the section 300(1) of, and schedule 1 to, the Trade Union and Labour Relations (Consolidation) Act 1992, which came into force on 16 October 1992.

The main provisions of the 1992 act mirror its predecessor's, albeit now with more complexities and restrictions. It contains rules on trade unions functioning and legal status, the presumption that a collective agreement is not binding, and immunity of unions who take strike action in contemplation or furtherance of a trade dispute.
