= Wages Councils Act 1979 =

Act of the Parliament of the United Kingdom

Wages Councils Act 1979 (Note: Section 32(1).)
- Act of Parliament
- Parliament of the United Kingdom
- Long title: An Act to consolidate the enactments relating to wages councils and statutory joint industrial councils.
- Citation: 1979 c. 12
- Territorial extent: England and Wales; Scotland; (Note: Section 32(3).)

Dates
- Royal assent: 22 March 1979
- Commencement: 22 April 1979 (Note: Section 32(2).)
- Repealed: 25 September 1986
Other legislation
Amends	See § Repealed enactments
Repeals/revokes	Wages Councils Act 1959
Repealed by	Wages Act 1986

Status: Repealed

Text of statute as originally enacted

The Wages Councils Act 1979 (c. 12) was an act of the Parliament of the United Kingdom that consolidated enactments relating to wages councils and statutory joint industrial councils in Great Britain.

== Provisions ==
=== Repealed enactments ===
Section 31(3) of the act repealed 8 enactments, listed in schedule 7 to the act.

Citation	Short title	Extent of repeal
7 & 8 Eliz. 2. c. 69	Wages Councils Act 1959	The whole act.
1968 c. 64	Civil Evidence Act 1968	In the Schedule, the paragraph relating to the Wages Councils Act 1959.
1968 c. 73	Transport Act 1968	In Schedule 11, the paragraph relating to the Wages Councils Act 1959.
1972 c. 68	European Communities Act 1972	In Schedule 4, in paragraph 9(4), the words " and in section 19(3)(b) of the Wages Councils Act 1959 ".
1973 c. 38	Social Security Act 1973	In Schedule 27, paragraph 21.
1974 c. 52	Trade Union and Labour Relations Act 1974	In Schedule 3, paragraph 9.
1975 c. 71	Employment Protection Act 1975	Sections 89 to 96.
1975 c. 71	Employment Protection Act 1975	In section 127(1), paragraph (a).
1975 c. 71	Employment Protection Act 1975	Schedules 7 and 8.
1975 c. 71	Employment Protection Act 1975	In Schedule 17, paragraph 11 and, in paragraph 12, the words "section 11 of the Wages Councils Act 1959".
1976 c. 3	Road Traffic (Drivers' Ages and Hours of Work) Act 1976	In section 2(3), the words "section 19(3)(b) of the Wages Councils Act 1959".

== Subsequent developments ==
The whole act was repealed by section 32(2) of, and part II of schedule 5 to, the Wages Act 1986, which came into force on 25 September 1986.
