= Wages Councils Act 1959 =

Act of the Parliament of the United Kingdom

Wages Councils Act 1959 (Note: Section 27(1).)
- Act of Parliament
- Parliament of the United Kingdom
- Long title: An Act to consolidate the enactments relating to Wages Councils.
- Citation: 7 & 8 Eliz. 2. c. 69
- Territorial extent: England and Wales; Scotland; (Note: Section 27(3).)

Dates
- Royal assent: 29 July 1959
- Commencement: 29 August 1959 (Note: Section 27(2).)
- Repealed: 22 April 1979
Other legislation
Amends	See § Repealed enactments
Repeals/revokes	See § Repealed enactments
Amended by	Statute Law (Repeals) Act 1974; Social Security (Consequential Provisions) Act 1975; House of Commons Disqualification Act 1975; Northern Ireland Assembly Disqualification Act 1975
Repealed by	Wages Councils Act 1979

Status: Repealed

Text of statute as originally enacted

The Wages Councils Act 1959 (7 & 8 Eliz. 2. c. 69) was an act of the Parliament of the United Kingdom that consolidated enactments relating to wages councils.

== Provisions ==
=== Repealed enactments ===
Section 26 of the act repealed 5 enactments, listed in the sixth schedule to the act.

Citation	Short title	Extent of repeal
8 & 9 Geo. 6. c. 17	Wages Councils Act 1945	The whole act.
9 & 10 Geo. 6. c. 62	National Insurance (Industrial Injuries) Act 1946	In section six, paragraph (c).
9 & 10 Geo. 6. c. 67	National Insurance Act 1946	In section six, in subsection (4), paragraph (c).
12, 13 & 14 Geo. 6. c. 7	Wages Councils Act 1948	The whole act, except the words from "Parts II" to the end in paragraph (c) of subsection (i) of section one and the First Schedule.
7 & 8 Eliz. 2. c. 26	Terms and Conditions of Employment Act 1959	The whole act, except section eight and so much of subsection (1) of section nine as provides for the short title.

== Subsequent developments ==
Schedule 6 to the act was repealed by section 1 of, and part XI of the schedule to, the Statute Law (Repeals) Act 1974, which came into force on 27 June 1974.

The act was repealed by section 31(3) of, and schedule 7 to, the Wages Councils Act 1979, which came into force on 22 April 1979.
