= Farmers' Union of Wales =

Welsh farmers' organisation

- Undeb Amaethwyr Cymru
- Abbreviation: FUW
- Founded: 1955; 71 years ago
- Type: Employer association
- Headquarters: Llys Amaeth, Plas Gogerddan, Aberystwyth, Ceredigion SY23 3BT
- Location: Wales
- President: Ian Rickman
- Deputy President: Dai Miles
- Chief Executive: Guto Bebb
- Website: fuw.org.uk

The Farmers’ Union of Wales (FUW), known as the Undeb Amaethwyr Cymru (UAC) in Welsh, is a member organisation that was formed in 1955 to represent farmers in Wales.

== History ==
=== Split from the NFU ===
Prior to the FUW, the National Farmers' Union (NFU) was the only organisation representing farming businesses in Wales. Increasingly, some Welsh members believed the NFU had been inadequate in negotiations during annual agricultural price review, and that the NFU prioritised big English farms over small Welsh ones. Further, the NFU refused to recognise the NFU Welsh Council. This was added to the recent increase in Welsh nationalist sentiment into the mid-20th century, as well as anger at the cost of the new NFU headquarters at Knightsbridge

These grievances culminated in 1955 when JB Evans and Ivor Davies agreed to canvass support for a new organisation. At a meeting of NFU's Carmarthenshire County Executive, the proposition of a new organisation was put forward, and Ivor Davies asked anyone who agreed to stay behind after the meeting. Twelve members did and they went on to form the Farmers' Union of Wales.

Ivor Davies was chosen as chairman and DT Davies as vice-chairman. J. B. Evans became the General Secretary of the FUW, and following a meeting in Aberystwyth, John Morris became the Deputy Secretary General and legal officer of the union. Speaking to JB Evans, NFU Welsh secretary Verley Merchant said "We will smash you in three months".

John Morris had originally only planned to take legal work for the NFU for a few months, but stayed in the position for three years. He helped open an office in Caernarfon to recruit members in Caernarfonshire and Anglesey. By the time Morris left the FUW in 1957, there were also offices in Dolgellau, Llangefni and Aberystwyth.

=== Recognition ===
During the Lib–Lab pact government, Liberal agricultural spokesman Geraint Howells pushed for official recognition of the FUW. Howells himself was a FUW member. On February 7, 1978, the FUW once again applied for formal recognition. Asked by John Silkin, the Minister of Agriculture, what Howells really wanted, Howells answered "Full recognition, nothing more, nothing less," to which Silkin affirmed would happen. The application was granted in under two months.

== Function ==
FUW offers expert advice, discounts and offers to members, advice on the policy and law, a network of local offices, and lobbies government and decision makers to give a voice to Welsh farmers.

The FUW nominates one of the two employers' representatives on the seven-member Agricultural Advisory Panel for Wales.

== Structure ==
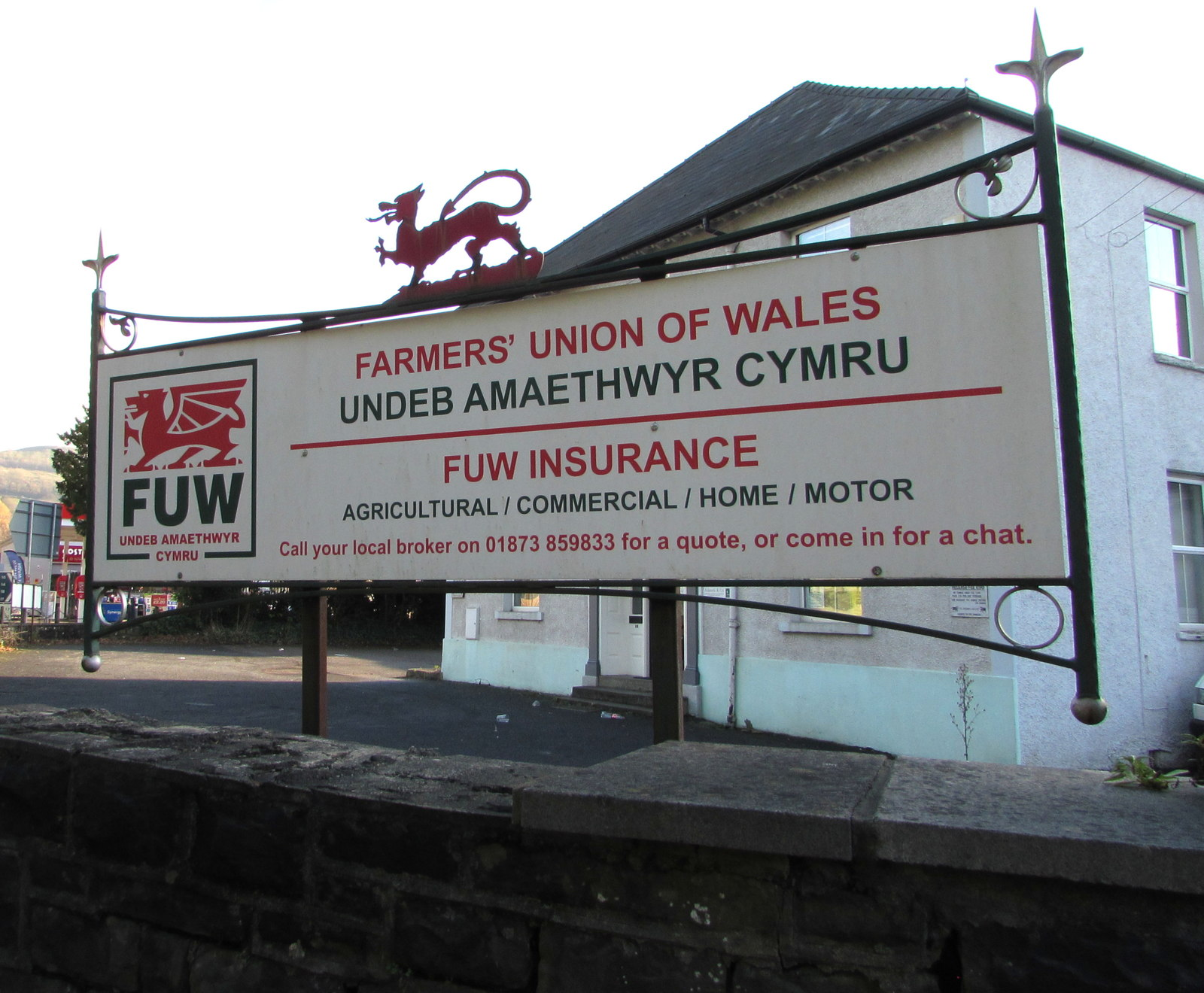
FUW office in Abergavenny

FUW members elect a Presidential Policy Team at national level who speak on behalf of Welsh farmers at local, national and international level and represent the FUW at ministerial meetings, stakeholder workshops and local branch meetings. There are 12 county branches, members of which elect the county committee including a president and a chairman and there is an office for each county branch. The local offices are located at:

- Llangefni (Anglesey)
- Caernarfon (Caernarfonshire)
- Ruthin (Denbighshire and Flintshire)
- Dolgellau (Merionethshire)
- Newtown (Montgomery)
- Builth Wells (Brecon and Radnor)
- Lampeter (Ceredigion)
- Haverfordwest (Pembrokeshire)
- Carmarthen (Carmarthenshire)
- Llanfoist (Gwent)
- Pencoed (Glamorgan)

There are 4 sector committees, made up of democratically elected farmers' representatives from the Union's 12 county branches for:

- Animal Health and Dairy
- Land Use & Climate Change
- Livestock & Hill Farming
- Rural Affairs Committee

Sector committee members, county officials, FUW officials and staff meet at the bi-monthly in the General Council, which is the FUW's main elected body

The FUW's headquarters are located in Aberystwyth, Ceredigion.

== Officers ==
=== Current ===
As of August 2024, the current officers of the FUW are:

- Ian Rickman (President)
- Dai Miles (Deputy President)
- Alun Owen (Regional Vice President)
- Brian Bowen (Regional Vice President)
- Anwen Hughes (Regional Vice President)

=== Former Presidents ===
- 1955–1958: Ivor T. Davies
- 1958–1961: D. T. Lewis
- 1961–1966: Glyngwyn Roberts
- 1966–1984: T. Myrddin Evans
- 1984–1991: H. R. M. Hughes
- 1991–2003: Bob Parry
- 2003–2011: Gareth Vaughan
- 2011–2015: Emyr Jones
- 2015–2023: Glyn Roberts

== See also ==
- Agriculture in the United Kingdom
- Agriculture in Wales
