= Agricultural Wages (Scotland) Act 1949 =

Act of the Parliament of the United Kingdom

Agricultural Wages (Scotland) Act 1949 (Note: Section 19.)
- Act of Parliament
- Parliament of the United Kingdom
- Long title: An Act to consolidate the Agricultural Wages (Regulation) (Scotland) Acts 1937 to 1947, and so much of the Holidays with Pay Act, 1938, as enables a wage regulating authority to make provision for holidays and holiday remuneration for workers in Agriculture in Scotland.
- Citation: 12, 13 & 14 Geo. 6. c. 30
- Territorial extent: Scotland (Note: Section 19.)

Dates
- Royal assent: 26 April 1949
- Commencement: 26 April 1949 (Note: The Acts of Parliament (Commencement) Act 1793.)

Other legislation
- Amends: See § Repealed enactments
- Repeals/revokes: See § Repealed enactments
- Amended by: Agriculture (Miscellaneous Provisions) Act 1972; Employment Protection Act 1975; National Minimum Wage Act 1998; Agricultural Wages (Scotland) Act 1949 (Amendment) Regulations 1999; Agriculture and Rural Communities (Scotland) Act 2024
- Relates to: Agricultural Wages (Regulation) Act 1947; Agricultural Wages Act 1948

Status: Partially repealed

Text of statute as originally enacted

Revised text of statute as amended

Text of the Agricultural Wages (Scotland) Act 1949 as in force today (including any amendments) within the United Kingdom, from legislation.gov.uk.

The Agricultural Wages (Scotland) Act 1949 (12, 13 & 14 Geo. 6. c. 30) is an act of the Parliament of the United Kingdom that consolidated enactments related to agricultural wages in Scotland.

The act established the Scottish Agricultural Wages Board.

== Provisions ==
=== Repealed enactments ===
Section 18 of the act repealed 3 enactments, listed in the fourth schedule to the act.

Citation	Short title	Extent of repeal
1 Edw. 8 & 1 Geo. 6. c. 53	Agricultural Wages (Regulation) (Scotland) Act 1937	The whole act.
1 & 2 Geo. 6. c. 70	Holidays with Pay Act 1938	Sections one, two, three and five so far as they relate to workers employed in agriculture.
10 & 11 Geo. 6. c. 15	Agricultural Wages (Regulation) Act 1947	The whole act.

== Subsequent developments ==
The Agriculture (Miscellaneous Provisions) Act 1972 abolished Scottish agricultural wages committees, repealing sections 2 and 8 of, and the second schedule to, the act.

The Employment Protection Act 1975 modified the functions of the Scottish Agricultural Wages Board.

The National Minimum Wage Act 1998 introduced provisions linking the act to the national minimum wage framework, including the insertion of section 17A, which governs the relationship between the act and the National Minimum Wage Act 1998.

The Agriculture and Rural Communities (Scotland) Act 2024 substituted section 13 of the act, relating to annual reporting requirements, with effect from 16 June 2025.

== See also ==
- Agricultural Wages Act 1948
- Agricultural Wages (Regulation) (Scotland) Act 1937
- Scottish Agricultural Wages Board
