= Agricultural Wages (Regulation) Act 1924 =

Act of the Parliament of the United Kingdom

Agricultural Wages (Regulation) Act 1924 (Note: Section 18.)
- Act of Parliament
- Parliament of the United Kingdom
- Long title: An Act to provide for the Regulation of Wages of Workers in Agriculture, and for purposes incidental thereto.
- Citation: 14 & 15 Geo. 5. c. 37
- Territorial extent: England and Wales

Dates
- Royal assent: 7 August 1924
- Commencement: 7 August 1924 (Note: The Acts of Parliament (Commencement) Act 1793.)
- Repealed: 13 July 1948
Other legislation
Amends	Corn Production Acts (Repeal) Act 1921
Repealed by	Agricultural Wages Act 1948

Status: Repealed

Text of statute as originally enacted

The Agricultural Wages (Regulation) Act 1924 (14 & 15 Geo. 5. c. 37) was an act of the Parliament of the United Kingdom passed in 1924 by the minority Labour Government.

It was the first attempt since the ill-fated Agriculture Act 1920 (10 & 11 Geo. 5. c. 76) to establish minimum wages for farm labourers. These wages were to be controlled by county wage committees, allowing wages to be set on a local level rather than a single national scale.

These county committees were independent of central government, and some set very low minimums, but the level of pay did slowly improve. An early draft of the bill had the Minister of Agriculture power to override the decisions of the county committees if they made decisions he felt unfair, but this clause was struck out by the Liberals before the bill was passed.

== Subsequent developments ==
The whole act was repealed by section 20 of, and the fifth schedule to, the Agricultural Wages Act 1948, which came into force on 13 July 1948.

== Bibliography ==
- Facts and Figures for Socialists, 1951. Labour Party Research Department, London, 1950
