= Holidays with Pay Act 1938 =

Act of the Parliament of the United Kingdom

Holidays with Pay Act 1938 (Note: Section 6(1).)
- Act of Parliament
- Parliament of the United Kingdom
- Long title: An Act to enable wage regulating authorities to make provision for holidays and holiday remuneration for workers whose wages they regulate, and to enable the Minister of Labour to assist voluntary schemes for securing holidays with pay for workers in any industry.
- Citation: 1 & 2 Geo. 6. c. 70
- Territorial extent: England and Wales; Scotland; (Note: Section 6(2).)

Dates
- Royal assent: 29 July 1938
- Commencement: 29 July 1938 (Note: The Acts of Parliament (Commencement) Act 1793.)
- Repealed: 22 July 2004
Other legislation
Amended by	Agricultural Wages (Regulation) Act 1947; Agricultural Wages (Scotland) Act 1949; Secretary of State for Employment and Productivity Order 1968; Statute Law (Repeals) Act 1975
Repealed by	Statute Law (Repeals) Act 2004

Status: Repealed

Text of statute as originally enacted

Revised text of statute as amended

The Holidays with Pay Act 1938 (1 & 2 Geo. 6. c. 70) was an act of the Parliament of the United Kingdom which provided for paid holidays for working class employees, and was the result of a twenty-year campaign.

It led to the popularity of holiday camps such as those run by Butlins

The provisions of the act have largely been replaced by the European Working Time Directive enacted by statutory instrument 1998/1833 - Working Time Regulations 1998.

== Subsequent developments ==
Sections 1, 2, 3 and 5 of the act so far as they relate to workers employed in agriculture were repealed by section 20 of, and the fifth schedule to, the Agricultural Wages Act 1948, which came into force on 13 July 1948.

Sections 1, 2, 3 and 5 of the act were repealed by section 1(1) of, and part V of the schedule to, the Statute Law (Repeals) Act 1975, which came into force on 13 March 1975.

The whole act was repealed by section 1(1) of, and part 8 of schedule 1 to, the Statute Law (Repeals) Act 2004, which came into force on 22 July 2004.
