= List of acts of the National Assembly for Wales from 2014 =

This is a list of acts of the National Assembly for Wales passed in 2014. Acts of the National Assembly for Wales are acts of Senedd Cymru enacted by Senedd Cymru (the Welsh Parliament; or simply the Senedd) under its former name of the National Assembly for Wales. It has legislative authority over devolved matters in relation to Wales under the authority of the Government of Wales Act 2006. All legislation passed by the Senedd is bilingual, with the English and Welsh texts being equally authoritative. Acts are cited by calendar year, in the same fashion as acts of Parliament of the United Kingdom. Each act passed in a respective year is numbered consecutively with Arabic numerals, following the prefix "anaw" (or, in Welsh, "dccc").

7 acts of the National Assembly for Wales were passed in 2014.

indicates that an act is available to view at legislation.gov.uk, and indicates the location of the original act in the National Library of Wales.

== Acts of the National Assembly for Wales ==
{{legislationuk|act |- | {{|Further and Higher Education (Governance and Information) (Wales) Act 2014|cyshort=Deddf Addysg Bellach ac Uwch (Llywodraethu a Gwybodaeth) (Cymru) 2014|anaw|1|27-01-2014|maintained=y|url=deddf-addysg-bellach-ac-uwch-llywodraethu-gwybodaeth-cymru-further-and-higher-education-governance-and-information-wales-act|An Act of the National Assembly for Wales to make provision about the governance of institutions within the further education sector and about the supply of information in connection with the provision of support to students in further or higher education.|cylong=Deddf gan Gynulliad Cenedlaethol Cymru i wneud darpariaeth ynghylch llywodraethu sefydliadau o fewn y sector addysg bellach ac ynghylch cyflenwi gwybodaeth mewn cysylltiad â darparu cymorth i fyfyrwyr mewn addysg bellach neu uwch.}} |- | {{|National Health Service Finance (Wales) Act 2014|cyshort=Deddf Cyllid y Gwasanaeth Iechyd Gwladol (Cymru) 2014|anaw|2|27-01-2014|maintained=y|url=deddf-cyllid-y-gwasanaeth-iechyd-gwladol-cymru-national-health-service-finance-wales-act|An Act of the National Assembly for Wales to make provision in relation to the financial duties of Local Health Boards.|cylong=Deddf Cynulliad Cenedlaethol Cymru i wneud darpariaeth mewn perthynas â dyletswyddau ariannol y Byrddau Iechyd Lleol.}} |- | {{|Control of Horses (Wales) Act 2014|cyshort=Deddf Rheoli Ceffylau (Cymru) 2014|anaw|3|27-01-2014|maintained=y|url=deddf-rheoli-ceffylau-cymru-control-of-horses-wales-act|An Act of the National Assembly for Wales to make provision for and in connection with the taking of action in relation to horses which are in public places without lawful authority or which are on other land without consent.|cylong=Deddf gan Gynulliad Cenedlaethol Cymru i wneud darpariaeth ar gyfer gweithredu mewn perthynas â cheffylau sydd mewn mannau cyhoeddus heb awdurdod cyfreithlon neu sydd ar dir arall heb ganiatâd, ac mewn cysylltiad â hynny.}} |- | {{|Social Services and Well-being (Wales) Act 2014|cyshort=Deddf Gwasanaethau Cymdeithasol a Llesiant (Cymru) 2014|anaw|4|01-05-2014|maintained=y|url=deddf-gwasanaethau-cymdeithasol-a-llesiant-cymru-social-services-and-well-being-wales-act|An Act of the National Assembly for Wales to reform social services law; to make provision about improving the well-being outcomes for people who need care and support and carers who need support; to make provision about co-operation and partnership by public authorities with a view to improving the well-being of people; to make provision about complaints relating to social care and palliative care; and for connected purposes.|cylong=Deddf Cynulliad Cenedlaethol Cymru i ddiwygio cyfraith gwasanaethau cymdeithasol; gwneud darpariaeth ynghylch gwella'r canlyniadau llesiant i bobl y mae arnynt angen gofal a chymorth ac i ofalwyr y mae arnynt angen cymorth; gwneud darpariaeth ynghylch cydweithredu a phartneriaeth gan awdurdodau cyhoeddus gyda golwg ar wella llesiant pobl; gwneud darpariaeth ynghylch cwynion sy'n ymwneud â gofal cymdeithasol a gofal lliniarol; ac at ddibenion cysylltiedig.}} |- | {{|Education (Wales) Act 2014|cyshort=Deddf Addysg (Cymru) 2014|anaw|5|12-05-2014|maintained=y|url=deddf-addysg-cymru-education-wales-act|An Act of the National Assembly for Wales to make provision about the Education Workforce Council (formerly the General Teaching Council for Wales); to extend the registration, qualification and training requirements of the education workforce; to make provision about the determination of school term and holiday dates in Wales; to make provision in connection with appointments to Her Majesty's Inspectorate of Education and Training in Wales; and for connected purposes.|cylong=Deddf gan Gynulliad Cenedlaethol Cymru i wneud darpariaeth ynghylch Cyngor y Gweithlu Addysg (Cyngor Addysgu Cyffredinol Cymru gynt); i estyn gofynion cofrestru, cymhwyso a hyfforddi'r gweithlu addysg; i wneud darpariaeth ynghylch penderfynu ar ddyddiadau tymhorau a gwyliau ysgol yng Nghymru; i wneud darpariaeth mewn cysylltiad â phenodiadau i Arolygiaeth Ei Mawrhydi dros Addysg a Hyfforddiant yng Nghymru; ac at ddibenion cysylltiedig.}} |- | {{|Agricultural Sector (Wales) Act 2014|cyshort=Deddf Sector Amaethyddol (Cymru) 2014|anaw|6|30-07-2014|maintained=y|archived=n|An Act of the National Assembly for Wales to make provision in relation to the agricultural sector in Wales; and for connected purposes.|cylong=Deddf gan Gynulliad Cenedlaethol Cymru i wneud darpariaeth mewn perthynas â'r sector amaethyddol yng Nghymru; ac at ddibenion cysylltiedig.}} |- | {{|Housing (Wales) Act 2014|cyshort=Deddf Tai (Cymru) 2014|anaw|7|17-09-2014|maintained=y|archived=n|An Act of the National Assembly for Wales to provide for the regulation of private rented housing; to reform the law relating to homelessness; to provide for assessment of the accommodation needs of Gypsies and Travellers and to require local authorities to meet those needs; to make provision about the standards of housing provided by local authorities; to abolish housing revenue account subsidy; to allow fully mutual housing associations to grant assured tenancies; to make provision about council tax payable for empty dwellings; and for other housing purposes.|cylong=Deddf gan Gynulliad Cenedlaethol Cymru i ddarparu ar gyfer rheoleiddio tai rhent preifat; diwygio'r gyfraith yn ymwneud â digartrefedd; i ddarparu ar gyfer asesu anghenion Sipsiwn a Theithwyr am lety ac i'w gwneud yn ofynnol i awdurdodau lleol gwrdd â'r anghenion hynny; i wneud darpariaeth ynghylch safonau'r tai y mae awdurdodau lleol yn eu darparu; i ddiddymu'r cymhorthdal cyfrif refeniw tai; i ganiatáu i gymdeithasau tai cwbl gydfuddiannol roi tenantiaethau sicr; i wneud darpariaeth ynghylch y dreth gyngor sy'n daladwy ar gyfer anheddau gwag; ac at ddibenion eraill sy'n ymwneud â thai.}} }}
