= Employment Protection Act 1975 =

Act of the Parliament of the United Kingdom

Employment Protection Act 1975 (Note: Section 129(1).)
- Act of Parliament
- Parliament of the United Kingdom
- Long title: An Act to establish machinery for promoting the improvement of industrial relations; to amend the law relating to workers' rights and otherwise to amend the law relating to workers, employers, trade unions and employers' associations; to provide for the establishment and operation of a Maternity Pay Fund; to provide for the extension of the jurisdiction of industrial tribunals; to amend the law relating to entitlement to and recoupment of unemployment benefit and supplementary benefit; to amend the Employment Agencies Act 1973 as respects the exercise of licensing functions under that Act; to amend the Employment and Training Act 1973 as respects the status of bodies established, and the powers of the Secretary of State, under that Act; to amend the Health and Safety at Work etc. Act 1974 as respects the appointment of safety representatives, health and safety at work in agriculture, the status of bodies established and the disclosure of information obtained under that Act; to provide for the extension of employment legislation to certain parliamentary staff and to certain areas outside Great Britain; and for connected purposes.
- Citation: 1975 c. 71
- Territorial extent: England and Wales; Scotland; (Note: Section 129(6).)

Dates
- Royal assent: 12 November 1975
- Commencement: various (Note: Section 129(2)–(4).)
Other legislation
Amends	Trade Union Act 1913; Agricultural Wages Act 1948; House of Commons Disqualification Act 1975
Repeals/revokes	Conciliation Act 1896; Terms and Conditions of Employment Act 1959
Amended by	Employment Protection (Consolidation) Act 1978; Administration of Justice Act 1977; House of Commons (Administration) Act 1978; Employment Protection (Consolidation) Act 1978; Wages Councils Act 1979; Employment Act 1980; Education (Scotland) Act 1980; Armed Forces Act 1981; Broadcasting Act 1981; Wages Act 1986; Employment Act 1990; Trade Union and Labour Relations (Consolidation) Act 1992; Statute Law (Repeals) Act 2004; Employment Rights Act 2025
Relates to	Trade Union and Labour Relations Act 1974

Status: Partially repealed

Text of statute as originally enacted

Revised text of statute as amended

Text of the Employment Protection Act 1975 as in force today (including any amendments) within the United Kingdom, from legislation.gov.uk.

The Employment Protection Act 1975 (c. 71) (EPA 1975) is an act of the Parliament of the United Kingdom. The long title was,

An Act to establish machinery for promoting the improvement of industrial relations; to amend the law relating to workers' rights and otherwise to amend the law relating to workers, employers, trade unions and employers' associations; to provide for the establishment and operation of a Maternity Pay Fund; to provide for the extension of the jurisdiction of employment tribunals; to amend the law relating to entitlement to and recoupment of unemployment benefit and supplementary benefit; to amend the Employment Agencies Act 1973 as respects the exercise of licensing functions under that Act; to amend the Employment and Training Act 1973 as respects the status of bodies established, and the powers of the Secretary of State, under that Act; to amend the Health and Safety at Work etc. Act 1974 as respects the appointment of safety representatives, health and safety at work in agriculture, the status of bodies established and the disclosure of information obtained under that Act; to provide for the extension of employment legislation to certain parliamentary staff and to certain areas outside Great Britain; and for connected purposes.

== Outline ==
Together with the Trade Union and Labour Relations Act 1974, these acts constituted the Labour Party's employment law programme during the era of the Social Contract, and the EPA established the employment tribunal system as a separate entity from the previous, formal court system. The act also established the Advisory, Conciliation and Arbitration Service (ACAS) as a statutory body.

== Provisions ==
=== Repealed enactments ===
Section 125 of the act repealed enactments, listed in schedule 6 to the act.

=== Short title, commencement and extent ===
Section 129(1) of the act provided that the act may be cited as the Employment Protection Act 1975.

Section 129(2) of the act provided that sections 87 and 88 of, and schedule 6 to, the act would come into force on days appointed by the Lord Chancellor.

Section 129(3) of the act provided that the rest of the act would come into force on days appointed by the Lord Chancellor.

Section 129(6) of the act provided that the act would not extend to Northern Ireland.
