= Social Contract (Britain) =

1970s British government policy

The Social Contract was an economic policy of the Labour governments of Harold Wilson and James Callaghan in 1970s Britain. The contract referred to a pact between the Labour government and the Trades Union Congress (TUC) in order to allow the former to govern the country more effectively. The main goal of the Social Contract was the control of wage inflation.

In return for a package of measures, such as the repeal of the Industrial Relations Act 1971, increased social expenditure, and measures to control the cost of living, such as food subsidies, price controls and a freeze on rent increases, the trade unions would ensure that their members would cooperate with a programme of voluntary wage restraint, in which pay rises were held down to limits set down by the government.

It should not be confused with the general concept of a social contract.

== Background ==
The idea for the contract was drawn up in January 1973 by Harold Wilson and Vic Feather of the TUC, in a document entitled Economic Policy and the Cost of Living. It was adopted as Labour Party policy soon after. It represented Labour's attempt at combating the rampant inflation which took hold in the early-1970s following the "Barber boom" and the 1973 oil crisis, by utilizing their close links with the trade union movement. The trade unions were a powerful force in 1970s Britain, with more than 13 million members.

== Results ==
When Labour returned to government in the February 1974 election The Social Contract was put into practice. For the first four years it operated with reasonable success: Inflation did decline significantly; it peaked at 26.9% in August 1975, and then steadily declined, reaching 12.9% in July 1976, it edged up to 17.7% the following June, before falling to 7.4% in June 1978. The government however, was unable to deliver the increased social expenditure which had been promised as part of the package, due to cuts in public spending imposed by the IMF after 1976. The Social Contract broke down however due to James Callaghan's attempt at holding pay rises to 5% or less in late 1978, which caused the unions to reject further pay restraint. The result was a breakdown in the government's pay policy, and widespread strikes in favour of higher pay rises over the winter of 1978–79, which became known as the Winter of Discontent.

== Influence in other countries ==
The Australian Labor Party adopted a modified version of The Social Contract, known as the Prices and Incomes Accord, which was introduced by the Labor government of Bob Hawke in 1983, and operated until 1996. The Accord was introduced by Ralph Willis, the Minister of Employment Relations, who had made a fact-finding mission to Britain in the late-1970s. In Willis's view, The Social Contract had been fairly successful, but fell apart because of what he saw as the inflexible and unrealistic 5% pay policy, he determined that similar mistakes would not be made in Australia. Other countries also adopted similar policies, such as the Wassenaar Agreement in the Netherlands.
