= Industrial Relations Act 1971 =

Act of the Parliament of the United Kingdom

Industrial Relations Act 1971 (Note: Section 170(1).)
- Act of Parliament
- Parliament of the United Kingdom
- Long title: An Act to amend the law relating to employers and workers and to organisations of employers and organisations of workers; to provide for the establishment of a National Industrial Relations Court and for extending the jurisdiction of industrial tribunals; to provide for the appointment of a Chief Registrar of Trade Unions and Employers' Associations, and of assistant registrars, and for establishing a Commission on Industrial Relations as a statutory body; and for purposes connected with those matters.
- Citation: 1971 c. 72
- Introduced by: Robert Carr (Commons)
- Territorial extent: England and Wales; Scotland; Northern Ireland (in part); (Note: Section 170(4).)

Dates
- Royal assent: 5 August 1971
- Commencement: 1 October 1971: in part (Note: The Industrial Relations Act 1971 (Commencement No. 1) Order 1971.); 1 November 1971: in part (Note: The Industrial Relations Act 1971 (Commencement No. 2) Order 1971.); 1 December 1971: in part (Note: The Industrial Relations Act 1971 (Commencement No. 3) Order 1971.); 28 February 1972: in part (Note: The Industrial Relations Act 1971 (Commencement No. 4) Order 1972.)
- Repealed: 16 September 1974
Other legislation
| Repeals/revokes | Provident Nominations and Small Intestacies Act 1883 |
| Repealed by | Trade Union and Labour Relations Act 1974 |

Status: Repealed

Text of statute as originally enacted

The Industrial Relations Act 1971 (c. 72) was an act of the Parliament of the United Kingdom, since repealed. It was based on proposals outlined in the governing Conservative Party's manifesto for the 1970 general election. The goal was to stabilise industrial relations by forcing concentration of bargaining power and responsibility in the formal union leadership, using the courts. The act was intensely opposed by unions, and helped undermine the government of Edward Heath. It was repealed by the Trade Union and Labour Relations Act 1974 when the Labour Party returned to government.

== Background ==
The act followed the Report of the Royal Commission on Trade Unions and Employers' Associations, led by Lord Donovan, which sought to reduce industrial conflict and introduce a claim for unfair dismissal. However, under a Conservative government, the protection for workers was reduced compared to the Donovan Report proposals, and coupled with suppression of the right to collective bargaining, compared to the previous position.

The second reading of the Industrial Relations Bill took place on 14 and 15 of December 1970, and the third reading on 24 March 1971.

== Contents ==
Workers were given the right to belong to a registered trade union or not to belong to a registered or unregistered trade union. Collective agreements were to be legally enforceable unless a disclaimer clause was inserted. There was a greater chance that collective 'no strike' clauses could be implied into individual contracts of employment. Only registered trade unions had legal rights and to enjoy legal immunities. Continued registration was dependent on the organisation having rules which specified how, when and by whom, authority was to be exercised, especially concerning the taking of industrial action.

A grievance procedure was required to be included in the written statement of particulars of the contract of employment. A worker under a normal contract of employment could receive compensation for unfair dismissal to encourage the development of dismissal procedures.

The law limited wildcat strikes and prohibited limitations on legitimate strikes. It also established the National Industrial Relations Court, which was empowered to grant injunctions as necessary to prevent injurious strikes and settle a variety of labour disputes.

== Trade union reaction ==
The Trades Union Congress (TUC) under the leadership of General Secretary Vic Feather campaigned against the legislation with a nationwide "Kill the Bill" campaign. On 12 January 1971 the TUC held a 'day of action' in protest, with a march through London. In March, 1,500,000 members of the Amalgamated Engineering Union staged a one-day strike. After the bill received royal assent, in September 1971 the TUC voted to require its member unions not to comply with its provisions (including registering as a union under the act). The Transport and General Workers' Union was twice fined for contempt of court over its refusal to comply. However, some smaller unions did comply and 32 were suspended from membership of the TUC at the 1972 congress.

== Protest ==
Campaigning against the bill eventually coalesced around individual workers. When the Pentonville Five were arrested for refusing to appear before the National Industrial Relations Court and imprisoned in the summer of 1972, their case received great publicity. Eventually, the Official Solicitor intervened to order their release.

== Repeal ==
Prime Minister Edward Heath called a general election over the issue of "Who Governs Britain?" in February 1974, during a lengthy dispute with the National Union of Mineworkers. Two days before polling day, the Director-General of the Confederation of British Industry Campbell Adamson made a speech in which he said "I should like to see the next government repeal the Act so that we can get proper agreement on what should replace it". Adamson's statement made headlines, and was thought to have damaged the Conservative Party's election prospects. Adamson's statement was repudiated by CBI President Sir Michael Clapham, and he offered to resign (the offer was refused).

The incoming Labour government repealed the act through the Trade Union and Labour Relations Act 1974.

== See also ==
- United Kingdom labour law

== Bibliography ==
- Moore, Charles. Margaret Thatcher: From Grantham to the Falklands (2013), ch. 10.
- Moran, Michael. The Politics of Industrial Relations: The Origins, Life and Death of the 1971 Industrial Relations Act (London: Macmillan, 1977) .
- Panitch, Leo. Social Democracy and Industrial Militancy: The Labour Party, the Trade Unions, and Incomes Policy, 1945–1974 (Cambridge U. Pr., 1976).
- Rideout, R. W. 'The Industrial Relations Act 1971' (1971) 34(6) Modern Law Review 655.
- Industrial Relations and the Limits of Law, Weekes, Mellish, Dickens, Loyd, 1975, p. 4, Basil Blackwell, Oxford.
