= Scottish Agricultural Wages Board =

Agency overview
- Formed: 1949
- Type: Executive non-departmental public body
- Jurisdiction: Scotland
- Headquarters: Saughton House, Edinburgh
- Agency executive: John Evans, Chair
- Website: www.gov.scot/groups/scottish-agricultural-wages-board/

The Scottish Agricultural Wages Board (SAWB) is an executive non-departmental public body of the Scottish Government. It sets minimum pay rates and other conditions for agricultural workers, as set out in the Agricultural Wages (Scotland) Order (No.73).

The board was set up in 1949, under the Agricultural Wages (Scotland) Act. The board's counterpart in England and Wales, the Agricultural Wages Board, was abolished on 25 June 2013, however in December 2015 the Scottish Government decided to retain the SAWB. This was announced shortly after they published analysis showing that without the board wages could be driven down for agricultural workers, with young apprentices and migrant workers thought to be particularly at risk.

The board usually meets twice a year to determine minimum wages for agricultural workers, and to set conditions for holiday and sick pay entitlement. It consists of 17 members:

- 6 nominated by the National Farmers' Union of Scotland and Scottish Land and Estates to represent the interests of employers
- 6 nominated by Unite the Union to represent the interests of workers
- 5 independent members appointed by the Scottish Government
