= Enterprise and Regulatory Reform Act 2013 =

Act of the Parliament of the United Kingdom

Enterprise and Regulatory Reform Act 2013 (Note: Section 104.)
- Act of Parliament
- Parliament of the United Kingdom
- Long title: An Act to make provision about the UK Green Investment Bank; to make provision about employment law; to establish and make provision about the Competition and Markets Authority and to abolish the Competition Commission and the Office of Fair Trading; to amend the Competition Act 1998 and the Enterprise Act 2002; to make provision for the reduction of legislative burdens; to make provision about copyright and rights in performances; to make provision about payments to company directors; to make provision about redress schemes relating to lettings agency work and property management work; to make provision about the supply of customer data; to make provision for the protection of essential supplies in cases of insolvency; to make provision about certain bodies established by Royal Charter; to amend section 9(5) of the Equality Act 2010; and for connected purposes.
- Citation: 2013 c. 24
- Introduced by: Vince Cable MP (Commons); Viscount Younger of Leckie (Lords)
- Territorial extent: United Kingdom (Note: Section 102.)

Dates
- Royal assent: 25 April 2013
- Commencement: Various (Note: Section 103.)
Other legislation
Amends	Osborne Estate Act 1902; Agricultural Wages Act 1948; House of Commons Disqualification Act 1975; Customs and Excise Management Act 1979; Solicitors (Scotland) Act 1980; National Heritage Act 1983; Town and Country Planning Act 1990; Planning (Listed Buildings and Conservation Areas) Act 1990; Law Reform (Miscellaneous Provisions) (Scotland) Act 1990; Water Industry Act 1991; Social Security (Consequential Provisions) Act 1992; Employment Tribunals Act 1996; Employment Rights Act 1996; Equality Act 2006; Wireless Telegraphy Act 2006; Tribunals, Courts and Enforcement Act 2007; Legal Services Act 2007; Postal Services Act 2011
Repeals/revokes	Wireless Telegraphy Act 1967
Amended by	Sentencing Act 2020; Digital Markets, Competition and Consumers Act 2024; Employment Rights Act 2025

Status: Amended

Text of statute as originally enacted

Revised text of statute as amended

The Enterprise and Regulatory Reform Act 2013 (c. 24), also known as ERRA, is an act of the Parliament of the United Kingdom aimed at reforming the regulatory environment faced by small and medium-sized business. It established a UK Green Investment Bank (part 1), reformed several aspects of employment law (part 2), cut regulation (part 5) and addressed a range of other regulatory issues. The act also strengthened the regulatory settlement on mergers and anti-competitive behaviour (parts 3 and 4). In doing so, part 3 of the Act established a new combined Competition and Markets Authority, which took over the functions of the Office of Fair Trading and the Competition Commission. It received Royal Assent on 25 April 2013. It implemented reforms to UK competition procedures which had been announced in March 2012.

== UK Green Investment Bank ==
Part 1 of the act dealt with the role and purposes of the UK Green Investment Bank.

== Competition provisions ==
A major feature of the act was the merger of the Office of Fair Trading (OFT) and Competition Commission to form a single Competition and Markets Authority (CMA) responsible for both "Phase 1" and "Phase 2" investigations, allowing greater synergy between the two. The ERRA also strengthened the criminal penalties for cartel behaviour by removing the requirement that such behaviour be dishonest: it "will be enough for prosecutors to show that an individual knowingly participated in one of the categories of criminal cartel agreement ... and that relevant information about the arrangements was not to be given to customers, or published, before its implementation". The CMA took on the role of primary enforcer for competition cases, although the Serious Fraud Office can also take action alongside the CMA.

== Mergers ==
The previous merger control regime, which was voluntary in nature, remained in place but the CMA's powers were extended to allow it to require merging businesses to operate independently until its review process had been completed.

== Criminal cartels ==
The requirement for dishonesty in criminal cartel conduct was removed.

== See also ==
- Competition Act 1998
- Enterprise Act 2002
