= Part-time job =

Form of employment that carries fewer hours per week than a full-time job

Part-time employment rate (%) in OECD countries

A part-time job is a form of employment that carries fewer hours per week than a full-time job. Workers are commonly considered to be part-time if they work fewer than 30 hours per week. Their hours of work may be organised in shifts. The shifts are often rotational.

According to the International Labour Organization, the number of part-time workers has increased from one-quarter to a half in the past 20 years in most developed countries, excluding the United States. There are many reasons for working part-time, including the desire for a less stressful schedule, having one's hours cut back by an employer and being unable to find a full-time job. The International Labour Organisation Convention 175 requires that part-time workers be treated no less favourably than full-time workers.

In some cases the nature of the work itself may require that the employees work part time. For example, some amusement parks are closed during the winter months and keep only a skeleton crew on hand for maintenance and office work. As a result of this cutback in staffing during the off season, employees who operate rides, or run gaming stands or staff concession stands may be classified as part-time workers owing to the months-long down time during which they may be technically employed, but not necessarily on active duty.

== Part-time contracts in Europe ==
=== European Union ===
In the EU, there is a strong East–West divide, where: "in Central and Eastern European countries part-time work remains a marginal phenomenon even among women, while the Western countries have embraced it much more widely." The highest percentage of part-time work is in the Netherlands (see below) and the lowest in Bulgaria. There is also a gap between women (32.1% EU average in 2015) and men (8.9%).

The Netherlands has by far the highest percentage of part-time workers in the EU. In 2012, 76.9% of women and 24.9% of men worked part-time. The high percentage of women working part-time has been explained by social norms and the historical context of the country, where women were among the last in Europe to enter the workforce, and when they did, most of them did so on a part-time basis; according to The Economist, fewer Dutch men had to fight in the world wars of the 20th century, and so Dutch women worked for pay to a lesser extent than in other countries. The wealth of the country, coupled with the fact that "[Dutch] politics was dominated by Christian values until the 1980s" meant that Dutch women were slower to enter the workforce. Research in 2016 led by professor Stijn Baert (Ghent University) debunked the idea that part-time work by students is an asset for their CV in respect of later employment chances.

=== United Kingdom ===
- Part-time Workers Directive
- Part-time Workers (Prevention of Less Favourable Treatment) Regulations 2000 (SI 2000/1551)

== Part-time contracts outside Europe ==
=== Australia ===
Part-time employment in Australia involves a comprehensive framework. Part-time employees work fewer hours than their full-time counterparts within a specific industry. This can vary, but is generally less than 32 hours per week. Part-time employees within Australia are legally entitled to paid annual leave, sick leave, and having maternity leave etc. except it is covered on a 'pro-rata' (percentage) basis depending on the hours worked each week. Furthermore, as a part-time employee is guaranteed a ular roster within a workplace, they are given an annular salary paid each week, fortnight, or month. Employers within Australia are obliged to provide minimum notice requirements for termination, redundancy and change of rostered hours in relation to part-time workers. As of January 2010, the number of part-time workers within Australia was approximately 3.3 million out of the 10.9 million individuals within the Australian workforce.

=== Canada ===
In Canada, part-time workers are those who usually work fewer than 30 hours per week at their main or only job. In 2007, just over 1 in every 10 employees aged 25 to 54 worked part-time. A person who has a part-time placement is often contracted to a company or business in which they have a set of terms they agree with. 'Part-time' can also be used in reference to a student (usually in higher education) who works only few hours a day. Usually students from different nations (India, China, Mexico etc.) prefer Canada for their higher studies due to the availability of more part-time jobs.

=== Iran ===
Part-time employment contracts are recognized under Iranian labor law. There are no specific legal requirements regarding the minimum or maximum number of hours a part-time employee can work, but they must receive benefits and protections proportionate to their working hours compared to full-time employees. According to Article 39 of Iran's Labor Law The wages and benefits payable to the workers who are engaged in work on part-time basis or for hours less than the officially determined working hours, shall be calculated and paid in proportion to the hours of work actually performed.

=== Japan ===
In Japan, part-time jobs are referred to as "Arubaito" (アルバイト; sometimes shortened as "Baito")—loanword from German Arbeit—or simply "Pāto" (パート). Despite both Arubaito and Pāto having the same definition by law, Arubaito mostly refers to students, while the latter refers to stay-at-home parent or freeter. Part-time workers in Japan are also entitled to the rights of workers such as paid annual leave, and are eligible for the same employee benefits that the company offers to full-time employees. It is popular among foreign students (especially for those who came from developing country) because it provides financial stability and language proficiency are often not required.

=== United States ===
According to the Bureau of Labor Statistics, working part-time is defined as working between 1 and 34 hours per week. In August 2026, 4.39 million people worked part time for economic reasons on a seasonally adjusted basis, while 22.75 million worked part time for noneconomic reasons. The Bureau of Labor Statistics defines the first group as people who worked 1 to 34 hours during the survey reference week because of conditions such as slack work, inability to find full-time work, or seasonal declines in demand. Typically, part-time employees in the United States are not entitled to employee benefits, such as health insurance. The Institute for Women's Policy Research reports that females are nine times likelier than males to work in a part-time capacity over a full-time capacity as a result of caregiving demands of their family members.

Increasing use of part-time workers in the United States is associated with employee scheduling software often resulting in expansion of the part-time workforce, reduction of the full-time workforce and scheduling which is unpredictable and inconvenient.

== Motives for part-time work ==
Part-time work makes it easier to take care of housework and family work after the birth of a child and to continue to work or to get back to work after a baby break and thus reconcile family and work. Part-time jobs leave more time for other activities (such as hobbies, further education, volunteering). Productivity of part-time workers can be higher than that of full-time workers because of lower stress, lower absenteeism, better work–life balance, and a more flexible work organization. Employees who are not fully resilient for health reasons may remain longer in part-time employment and it can be a smooth transition into retirement. Working less fits the lifestyle of simple living and earning and spending less can contribute to climate change mitigation.

== See also ==
- Temporary work
- Part-time student
- UK labour law
- US labor law
- Iranian labor law
