= Fixed-term Work Directive 1999 =

Directive 1999/70/EC
- European Union directive
- Title: Council Directive 1999/70/EC of 28 June 1999 concerning the framework agreement on fixed-term work concluded by ETUC, UNICE and CEEP
- Made by: Council

The Fixed-term Work Directive 99/70/EC is one of three EU Directives that regulate atypical work. Alongside the Part-time Work Directive and the Agency Work Directive its aim is to ensure that people who have not contracted for permanent jobs are nevertheless guaranteed a minimum level of equal treatment compared to full-time permanent staff. Fixed-term work contracts purport to be of limited duration, but staff with such contracts can claim that they are permanent after a maximum of four years. Member states in the European union can, and usually do, go beyond the minimum.

== Content ==
Article 1 of the Directive states its purpose to enforce the framework agreement between the ETUC, the UNICE and the CEEP. This gives rise to the various provisions on fixed-term worker rights in the Directive.

- clause 3(1) states that a fixed term worker is ‘a person having an employment contract or relationship entered into directly between an employer and a worker where the end of the employment relationship is determined by objective conditions such as reaching a specific date, completing a specific task, or the occurrence of a specific event’. This definition was intended to exclude agency workers by referring to an employment contract entered into ‘directly’: their rights are found in the Agency Work Directive.
- clause 4(1) says that ‘in respect of employment conditions, fixed-term workers shall not be treated in a less favourable manner than comparable permanent workers solely because they have a fixed term contract or relation unless different treatment is justified on objective grounds.’ (2) pro-rata (3) social partners should be consulted before qualification periods set (4) ‘Period-of service qualifications relating to particular conditions of employment shall be the same for fixed-term workers as for permanent workers except where different length-of service qualifications are justified on objective grounds.’
- clause 5 prevents abuse of fixed term contracts, by implementing either (a) objective reasons for renewal (b) a limit of total duration of successive fixed term contracts (c) a limit of number of renewals
- clause 6 requires that fixed-term workers receive the same information and employment opportunities
- clause 7 requires that fixed-term workers receive the same information and consultation rights
- clause 8, says that member states can be more favourable in their national laws

== Implementation ==
=== EU case law ===
- Adeneler v Ellinikos Organismos Galaktos (2006) C-212/04, [2006] IRLR 716
- Mangold v Helm [2006] IRLR 143 (C-144/04)
- Del Cerro Alonso v Osakidetza-Servicio Vasco de Salud (2007) C-307/05, [2007] IRLR 911
- MP v Consejería de Presidencia, Justicia e Interior de la Comunidad de Madrid and IP v Universidad Nacional de Educación a Distancia (UNED) and IK v Agencia Madrileña de Atención Social de la Comunidad de Madrid (2024) C‑59/22, C‑110/22 and C‑159/22

=== United Kingdom ===
In UK labour law, the ERA 1996 sections 95(1)(b), 136(1)(b), 235(2B) already regulated fixed-term work for the purpose of unfair dismissal. In Ford v Warwickshire CC the House of Lords held that a teacher who was employed each year, but who always continued to work after the summer break, did count as having continuous employment for the purpose of an unfair dismissal claim.

The Fixed-term Employees (Prevention of Less Favourable Treatment) Regulations 2002 implemented the Directive.
