= List of statutory instruments of the United Kingdom, 2000 (1–1700) =

This is an incomplete list of statutory instruments of the United Kingdom in 2000 (1–1700).

== 1–100 ==
- The Rent Officers (Housing Benefit Functions) (Amendment) Order 2000 (S.I. 2000 No. 1)
- The M62 Motorway (New Junction 8 and Widening Junction 8 to 9) Connecting Roads Scheme 2000 (S.I. 2000 No. 2)
- The Rent Officers (Housing Benefit Functions) (Scotland) Amendment Order 2000 (S.I. 2000 No. 3)
- The Housing Benefit and Council Tax Benefit (General) Amendment Regulations 2000 (S.I. 2000 No. 4)
- The Council Tax and Non-Domestic Rating (Demand Notices) (England) (Amendment) Regulations 2000 (S.I. 2000 No. 5)
- The Rail Vehicle Accessibility (Croydon Tramlink Class CR4000 Vehicles) Exemption Order 2000 (S.I. 2000 No. 6)
- The Retailers' Records for Veterinary Medicinal Products Regulations 2000 (S.I. 2000 No. 7)
- The Road Traffic (Permitted Parking Area and Special Parking Area) (Metropolitan Borough of Sefton) Order 2000 (S.I. 2000 No. 8)
- The Children (Performances) Amendment Regulations 2000 (S.I. 2000 No. 10)
- The Community Care (Direct Payments) Amendment Regulations 2000 (S.I. 2000 No. 11)
- The Civil Aviation (Canadian Navigation Services) (Revocation) Regulations 2000 (S.I. 2000 No. 12)
- The Potatoes Originating in Egypt (Amendment) (England) Regulations 2000 (S.I. 2000 No. 22)
- The A40 Trunk Road (Park Royal Slip Roads) Order 2000 (S.I. 2000 No. 38)
- The Sea Fishing (Enforcement of Community Control Measures) Order 2000 (S.I. 2000 No. 51)
- The Adoption (Intercountry Aspects) Act 1999 (Commencement No. 1) Order 2000 (S.I. 2000 No. 52 (C. 1)])
- The Television Broadcasting Regulations 2000 (S.I. 2000 No. 54)
- The Social Security Amendment (Education Maintenance Allowance) Regulations 2000 (S.I. 2000 No. 55)
- The Education (Funding for Teacher Training) Designation Order 2000 (S.I. 2000 No. 57)
- The Cremation (Amendment) Regulations 2000 (S.I. 2000 No. 58)
- The Llanelli (North Dock) Harbour Revision Order 2000 (S.I. 2000 No. 62)
- The Local Authorities (Goods and Services) (Public Bodies) Order 2000 (S.I. 2000 No. 63)
- The Primary Care Trusts (Membership, Procedure and Administration Arrangements) Regulations 2000 (S.I. 2000 No. 89)
- The Health Act 1999 (Supplementary, Consequential etc. Provisions) Order 2000 (S.I. 2000 No. 90)
- The Food Standards Act 1999 (Commencement No. 1) Order 2000 (S.I. 2000 No. 92 (C. 2))

== 101–200 ==
- The Nursery Education (England) Regulations 2000 (S.I. 2000 No. 107)
- The Superannuation (Admission to Schedule 1 to the Superannuation Act 1972) Order 2000 (S.I. 2000 No. 108)
- The Export of Goods (Control) (Amendment) Order 2000 (S.I. 2000 No. 109)
- The Social Security and Child Support (Decisions and Appeals) Amendment Regulations 2000 (S.I. 2000 No. 119)
- The National Health Service (Pharmaceutical Services) Amendment Regulations 2000 (S.I. 2000 No. 121)
- The National Health Service (Charges for Drugs and Appliances) Amendment Regulations 2000 (S.I. 2000 No. 122)
- The Health Service Medicines (Control of Pricesof Branded Medicines) Regulations 2000 (S.I. 2000 No. 123)
- The Health Service Medicines (Price Control Appeals) Regulations 2000 (S.I. 2000 No. 124)
- The Tax Credits (Decisions and Appeals) (Amendment) Regulations 2000 (S.I. 2000 No. 127)
- The Pressure Systems Safety Regulations 2000 (S.I. 2000 No. 128)
- The Trade Marks Rules 2000 (S.I. 2000 No. 136)
- The Trade Marks (Fees) Rules 2000 (S.I. 2000 No. 137)
- The Trade Marks (International Registration) (Amendment) Order 2000 (S.I. 2000 No. 138)
- The Public Order (Prescribed Forms) Regulations (Northern Ireland) 2000 (S.I. 2000 No. 155)
- The Telecommunications (Data Protection and Privacy) (Amendment) Regulations 2000 (S.I. 2000 No. 157)
- The Public Telecommunication System Designation (WTI Telecom (UK) Limited) Order 2000 (S.I. 2000 No. 162)
- The Public Telecommunication System Designation (Vine Telecom Networks Limited) Order 2000 (S.I. 2000 No. 163)
- The Immigration and Asylum Act 1999 (Commencement No. 2 and Transitional Provisions) Order 2000 (S.I. 2000 No. 168 (C. 3)])
- The Inheritance Tax (Settled Property Income Yield) Order 2000 (S.I. 2000 No. 174)
- The Social Security (Contributions) (Amendment) Regulations 2000 (S.I. 2000 No. 175)
- The Social Security (Contributions) (Amendment) (Northern Ireland) Regulations 2000 (S.I. 2000 No. 176)
- The Firearms (Amendment) Act 1988(Firearms Consultative Committee) Order 2000 (S.I. 2000 No. 177)
- The Health Authorities Act 1995 (Rectification of Transitional Arrangements) Order 2000 (S.I. 2000 No. 179)
- The Infant Class Sizes (Admission and Standard Numbers) (England) Regulations 2000 (S.I. 2000 No. 180)
- The Sea Fishing (Enforcement of Community Satellite Monitoring Measures) Order 2000 (S.I. 2000 No. 181)
- The Rail Vehicle Accessibility (LTS Rail Class 357 Vehicles) Exemption Order 2000 (S.I. 2000 No. 182)
- The Data Protection Act 1998 (Commencement) Order 2000 (S.I. 2000 No. 183 (C.4)])
- The Data Protection (Corporate Finance Exemption) Order 2000 (S.I. 2000 No. 184)
- The Data Protection (Conditions under Paragraph 3 of Part II of Schedule 1) Order 2000 (S.I. 2000 No. 185)
- The Data Protection (Functions of Designated Authority) Order 2000 (S.I. 2000 No. 186)
- The Data Protection (Fees under section 19(7)) Regulations 2000 (S.I. 2000 No. 187)
- The Data Protection (Notification and Notification Fees) Regulations 2000 (S.I. 2000 No. 188)
- The Data Protection Tribunal (Enforcement Appeals) Rules 2000 (S.I. 2000 No. 189)
- The Data Protection (International Co-operation) Order 2000 (S.I. 2000 No. 190)
- The Data Protection (Subject Access) (Fees and Miscellaneous Provisions) Regulations 2000 (S.I. 2000 No. 191)
- The Conservation (Natural Habitats, &c.) (Amendment) (England) Regulations 2000 (S.I. 2000 No. 192)

== 201–300 ==
- The Agriculture (Closure of Grant Schemes) (England) Regulations 2000 (S.I. 2000 No. 205)
- The Data Protection Tribunal (National Security Appeals) Rules 2000 (S.I. 2000 No. 206)
- The Financial Assistance for Environmental Purposes Order 2000 (S.I. 2000 No. 207)
- The Greater London Authority Elections Rules 2000 (S.I. 2000 No. 208)
- The Hillingdon Primary Care Trust (Establishment) Order 2000 (S.I. 2000 No. 209)
- The South Manchester Primary Care Trust (Establishment) Order 2000 (S.I. 2000 No. 210)
- The Daventry and South Northamptonshire Primary Care Trust (Establishment) Order 2000 (S.I. 2000 No. 211)
- The National Health Service Trusts (Trust Funds: Appointment of Trustees) Order 2000 (S.I. 2000 No. 212)
- The Local Authorities (Alteration of Requisite Calculations) (England) Regulations 2000 (S.I. 2000 No. 213)
- The Major Precepting Authorities (Excessive Budget Requirements—Payments) (England) Regulations 2000 (S.I. 2000 No. 214)
- The Powers of Attorney (Welsh Language Forms) Order 2000 (S.I. 2000 No. 215)
- The Trustee Delegation Act 1999 (Commencement) Order 2000 (S.I. 2000 No. 216 (C. 5)])
- The Osteopaths Act 1993 (Commencement No. 5) Order 2000 (S.I. 2000 No. 217 (C. 6)])
- The Central Derby Primary Care Trust (Establishment) Order 2000 (S.I. 2000 No. 218)
- The North East Lincolnshire Primary Care Trust (Establishment) Order 2000 (S.I. 2000 No. 219)
- The National Health Service (General Medical Services) Amendment Regulations 2000 (S.I. 2000 No. 220)
- The Civil Procedure (Amendment) Rules 2000 (S.I. 2000 No. 221 (L.1)])
- The Defamation Act 1996 (Commencement No. 2) Order 2000 (S.I. 2000 No. 222 (C.7)])
- The Newark and Sherwood Primary Care Trust (Establishment) Order 2000 (S.I. 2000 No. 223)
- The Meat (Hygiene and Inspection) (Charges) (Amendment) (England) Regulations 2000 (S.I. 2000 No. 224)
- The Meat (Enhanced Enforcement Powers) (England) Regulations 2000 (S.I. 2000 No. 225)
- The Mansfield District Primary Care Trust (Establishment) Order 2000 (S.I. 2000 No. 226)
- The Contaminated Land (England) Regulations 2000 (S.I. 2000 No. 227)
- The Maidstone and Tunbridge Wells National Health Service Trust (Establishment) Order 2000 (S.I. 2000 No. 237)
- The Kent and Sussex Weald and the Mid Kent Healthcare National Health Service Trusts (Dissolution) Order 2000 (S.I. 2000 No. 238)
- The Jobseeker's Allowance (Amendment) Regulations 2000 (S.I. 2000 No. 239)
- The Greater London Magistrates' Courts Authority (Transitional Provisions) Order 2000 (S.I. 2000 No. 240)
- The General Osteopathic Council (Professional Conduct Committee) (Procedure) Rules Order of Council 2000 (S.I. 2000 No. 241)
- The General Osteopathic Council (Health Committee) (Procedure) Rules Order of Council 2000 (S.I. 2000 No. 242)
- The General Osteopathic Council (Health Committee) (Appeals) Rules Order of Council 2000 (S.I. 2000 No. 243)
- The National Park Authorities Levies (Wales) (Amendment) Regulations 2000 (S.I. 2000 No. 244 (W. 2))
- Rheoliadau Ardollau Awdurdodau'r Parciau Cenedlaethol (Cymru) (Diwygio) 2000 (S.I. 2000 Rhif 244 (Cy. 2))
- The Gas Act 1995 (Standards of Performance) (Extension of Period) Order 2000 (S.I. 2000 No. 245)
- The A23 Trunk Road (Croydon) Red Route (Prohibited Turns) (No. 3) Experimental Traffic Order 1998 Revocation Order 2000 (S.I. 2000 No. 246)
- The A1 Trunk Road (Islington) Red Route (Bus Priority) Experimental Traffic Order 2000 (S.I. 2000 No. 247)
- The Transfer of Functions (Minister for the Civil Service and Treasury) Order 2000 (S.I. 2000 No. 250)
- The Judicial Committee (Osteopaths Rules) Order 2000 (S.I. 2000 No. 251)
- The Naval, Military and Air Forces Etc. (Disablement and Death) Service Pensions Amendment Order 2000 (S.I. 2000 No. 252)
- The National Assembly for Wales (Transfer of Functions) Order 2000 (S.I. 2000 No. 253 (W. 5)])
- The Nelson and West Merton Primary Care Trust (Establishment) Order 2000 (S.I. 2000 No. 254)
- The Poole Bay Primary Care Trust (Establishment) Order 2000 (S.I. 2000 No. 255)
- The Poole Central and North Primary Care Trust (Establishment) Order 2000 (S.I. 2000 No. 256)
- The Southampton East Healthcare Primary Care Trust (Establishment) Order 2000 (S.I. 2000 No. 257)
- The Value Added Tax (Amendment) Regulations 2000 (S.I. 2000 No. 258)
- The Local Authorities (Capital Finance) (Rate of Discount for 2000/01) (England) Regulations 2000 (S.I. 2000 No. 259)
- The Competition Act 1998 (Concurrency) Regulations 2000 (S.I. 2000 No. 260)
- The Competition Commission Appeal Tribunal Rules 2000 (S.I. 2000 No. 261)
- The Competition Act 1998 (Small Agreements and Conduct of Minor Significance) Regulations 2000 (S.I. 2000 No. 262)
- The Competition Act 1998 (Notification of Excluded Agreements and Appealable Decisions) Regulations 2000 (S.I. 2000 No. 263)
- The Immigration (Regularisation Period for Overstayers) Regulations 2000 (S.I. 2000 No. 265)
- The Value Added Tax (Deemed Supply of Goods) Order 2000 (S.I. 2000 No. 266)
- The National Health Service (Functions of Health Authorities and Administration Arrangements) Amendment Regulations 2000 (S.I. 2000 No. 267)
- The North Peterborough Primary Care Trust (Establishment) Order 2000 (S.I. 2000 No. 283)
- The South Peterborough Primary Care Trust (Establishment) Order 2000 (S.I. 2000 No. 284)
- The Tendring Primary Care Trust (Establishment) Order 2000 (S.I. 2000 No. 285)
- The Fenland Primary Care Trust (Establishment) Order 2000 (S.I. 2000 No. 286)
- The Epping Forest Primary Care Trust (Establishment) Order 2000 (S.I. 2000 No. 287)
- The Special Commissioners (Jurisdiction and Procedure) (Amendment) Regulations 2000 (S.I. 2000 No. 288)
- The Enduring Powers of Attorney (Welsh Language Prescribed Form) Regulations 2000 (S.I. 2000 No. 289)
- The Consumer Credit (Credit Reference Agency) Regulations 2000 (S.I. 2000 No. 290)
- The Consumer Credit (Conduct of Business) (Credit References) (Amendment) Regulations 2000 (S.I. 2000 No. 291)
- The Medicines for Human Use (Marketing Authorisations Etc.) Amendment Regulations 2000 (S.I. 2000 No. 292)
- The Competition Act 1998 (Director's rules) Order 2000 (S.I. 2000 No. 293)
- The Education (Exclusion from School) (Prescribed Periods) (Amendment) (England) Regulations 2000 (S.I. 2000 No. 294)
- The Education (Pupil Information) (England) Regulations 2000 (S.I. 2000 No. 297)
- The Oxfordshire County Council (Buscot Footbridge) Scheme 1999 Confirmation Instrument 2000 (S.I. 2000 No. 298)
- The Water Undertakers (Rateable Values) (Wales) Order 2000 (S.I. 2000 No. 299 (W.6))
- Gorchymyn Ymgymerwyr Dŵ r (Gwerthoedd Ardrethol) (Cymru) 2000 (S.I. 2000 Rhif 299 (Cy.6))
- The Crime and Disorder Strategies (Prescribed Descriptions) (Amendment) Order 2000 (S.I. 2000 No. 300)

== 301–400 ==
- The Personal Injuries (Civilians) Amendment Scheme 2000 (S.I. 2000 No. 301)
- The Southend on Sea Primary Care Trust (Establishment) Order 2000 (S.I. 2000 No. 307)
- The Greater London Authority (Elections and Acceptance of Office) Order 2000 (S.I. 2000 No. 308)
- The Competition Act 1998 (Determination of Turnover for Penalties) Order 2000 (S.I. 2000 No. 309)
- The Competition Act 1998 (Land and Vertical Agreements Exclusion) Order 2000 (S.I. 2000 No. 310)
- The Competition Act 1998 (Transitional, Consequential and Supplemental Provisions) Order 2000 (S.I. 2000 No. 311)
- The London Borough of Bexley (Electoral Changes) Order 2000 (S.I. 2000 No. 312)
- The London Borough of Havering (Electoral Changes) Order 2000 (S.I. 2000 No. 313)
- The London Borough of Richmond upon Thames (Electoral Changes) Order 2000 (S.I. 2000 No. 314)
- The London Borough of Wandsworth (Electoral Changes) Order 2000 (S.I. 2000 No. 315)
- The London Borough of Harrow (Electoral Changes) Order 2000 (S.I. 2000 No. 316)
- The London Borough of Hounslow (Electoral Changes) Order 2000 (S.I. 2000 No. 317)
- The London Borough of Merton (Electoral Changes) Order 2000 (S.I. 2000 No. 318)
- The London Borough of Lambeth (Electoral Changes) Order 2000 (S.I. 2000 No. 319)
- The London Borough of Barnet (Electoral Changes) Order 2000 (S.I. 2000 No. 333)
- The London Borough of Ealing (Electoral Changes) Order 2000 (S.I. 2000 No. 334)
- The London Borough of Redbridge (Electoral Changes) Order 2000 (S.I. 2000 No. 335)
- The London Borough of Waltham Forest (Electoral Changes) Order 2000 (S.I. 2000 No. 336)
- The Local Government Best Value (Exemption) (England) Order 2000 (S.I. 2000 No. 339)
- The Environment Act 1995 (Commencement No. 16 and Saving Provision) (England) Order 2000 (S.I. 2000 No. 340 (C. 8)])
- The Judicial Pensions (Additional Voluntary Contributions) (Amendment) Regulations 2000 (S.I. 2000 No. 342)
- The Greater London Authority (Allocation of Grants for Precept Calculations) Regulations 2000 (S.I. 2000 No. 343)
- The Competition Act 1998 (Commencement No. 5) Order 2000 (S.I. 2000 No. 344 (C. 9)])
- The Social Security (Contributions) (Amendment No. 2) (Northern Ireland) Regulations 2000 (S.I. 2000 No. 346)
- The Housing (Right to Buy) (Priority of Charges) (Wales) Order 2000 (S.I. 2000 No. 349 (W. 7))
- Gorchymyn Tai (Hawl i Brynu) (Blaenoriaeth Arwystlon) (Cymru) 2000 (S.I. 2000 Rhif 349 (Cy. 7))
- The Potatoes Originating in Egypt (Amendment) (Wales) Regulations 2000 (S.I. 2000 No. 350 (W. 8))
- Rheoliadau Tatws sy'n Deillio o'r Aifft (Diwygio) (Cymru) 2000 (S.I. 2000 Rhif 350 (Cy. 8))
- The BG plc (Rateable Value) (Wales) Order 2000 (S.I. 2000 No 352 (W. 10))
- Gorchymyn BG plc (Gwerth Ardrethol) (Cymru) 2000 (S.I. 2000 Rhif 352 (Cy. 10))
- The Contracting Out (Functions in Relation to Petroleum Royalty Payments) Order 2000 (S.I. 2000 No. 353)
- The Phoenix College (Dissolution) Order 2000 (S.I. 2000 No. 354)
- The North Riding College Higher Education Corporation (Dissolution) Order 2000 (S.I. 2000 No. 355)
- The Food (Peanuts from Egypt) (Emergency Control) (England and Wales) Order 2000 (S.I. 2000 No. 375)
- The Weighing Equipment (Filling and Discontinuous Totalising Automatic Weighing Machines) (Amendment) Regulations 2000 (S.I. 2000 No. 387)
- The Weighing Equipment (Automatic Gravimetric Filling Instruments) Regulations 2000 (S.I. 2000 No. 388)
- The Northern Ireland Act 2000 (Commencement) Order 2000 (S.I. 2000 No. 396 (C.10))

== 401–500 ==
- The Grants to the Churches Conservation Trust Order 2000 (S.I. 2000 No. 402)
- The South Essex Mental Health and Community Care National Health Service Trust (Establishment) Order 2000 (S.I. 2000 No. 406)
- The Southend Community Care Services and the Thameside Community Healthcare National Health Service Trusts (Dissolution) Order 2000 (S.I. 2000 No. 407)
- The A10 Trunk Road (Haringey) Red Route Traffic Order 2000 (S.I. 2000 No. 408)
- The Valuation Tribunals (Amendment) (England) Regulations 2000 (S.I. 2000 No. 409)
- The United Lincolnshire Hospitals National Health Service Trust (Establishment) Order 2000 (S.I. 2000 No. 410)
- The Grantham and District Hospital, the Lincoln and Louth and the Pilgrim Health National Health Service Trusts (Dissolution) Order 2000 (S.I. 2000 No. 411)
- The Greater London Authority Act 1999 (Hackney Carriages and Private Hire Vehicles) (Transitional and Consequential Provisions) Order 2000 (S.I. 2000 No. 412)
- The Data Protection (Subject Access Modification) (Health) Order 2000 (S.I. 2000 No. 413)
- The Data Protection (Subject Access Modification) (Education) Order 2000 (S.I. 2000 No. 414)
- The Data Protection (Subject Access Modification) (Social Work) Order 2000 (S.I. 2000 No. 415)
- The Data Protection (Crown Appointments) Order 2000 (S.I. 2000 No. 416)
- The Data Protection (Processing of Sensitive Personal Data) Order 2000 (S.I. 2000 No. 417)
- The Data Protection (Designated Codes of Practice) Order 2000 (S.I. 2000 No. 418)
- The Data Protection (Miscellaneous Subject Access Exemptions) Order 2000 (S.I. 2000 No. 419)
- The Employment Relations Act 1999 (Commencement No. 4 and Transitional Provision) Order 2000 (S.I. 2000 No. 420 (C. 11)])
- The Tax Credits Schemes Amendment (Education Maintenance Allowance) Regulations 2000 (S.I. 2000 No. 421)
- The North West Shropshire Education Action Zone (No. 2) Order 2000 (S.I. 2000 No. 422)
- The South of England Virtual Education Action Zone (No. 2) Order 2000 (S.I. 2000 No. 423)
- The Council Tax (Exempt Dwellings) (Amendment) (England) Order 2000 (S.I. 2000 No. 424)
- The Guaranteed Minimum Pensions Increase Order 2000 (S.I. 2000 No. 425)
- The Channel Tunnel (Alcoholic Liquor and Tobacco Products) Order 2000 (S.I. 2000 No. 426)
- The Greater London Authority Elections (No. 2) Rules 2000 (S.I. 2000 No. 427)
- Knowsley Industrial Park (Rail Terminal) Order 1999 (S.I. 2000 No. 428)
- The Land Registration Rules 2000 (S.I. 2000 No. 429)
- The Land Registration (District Registries) Order 2000 (S.I. 2000 No. 430)
- The Legal Aid in Criminal and Care Proceedings (General) (Amendment) Regulations 2000 (S.I. 2000 No. 431)
- The Greater London Authority (Disqualification) Order 2000 (S.I. 2000 No. 432)
- The Industrial Training Levy (Engineering Construction Board) Order 2000 (S.I. 2000 No. 433)
- The Industrial Training Levy (Construction Board) Order 2000 (S.I. 2000 No. 434)
- The Sea Fishing (Enforcement of Measures for the Recovery of the Stock of Cod) (Irish Sea) Order 2000 (S.I. 2000 No. 435)
- The Social Security Benefits Up-rating Order 2000 (S.I. 2000 No. 440)
- The Community Legal Service (Costs) Regulations 2000 (S.I. 2000 No. 441)
- The Legal Services Commission (Disclosure of Information) Regulations 2000 (S.I. 2000 No. 442)
- The Education (Grants) (Royal Ballet School) Regulations 2000 (S.I. 2000 No. 443)
- The Civil Legal Aid (General) (Amendment) Regulations 2000 (S.I. 2000 No. 451)
- The Northern Ireland Arms Decommissioning Act 1997 (Amnesty Period) Order 2000 (S.I. 2000 No. 452)
- The Immigration and Asylum Act 1999 (Commencement No. 3) Order 2000 (S.I. 2000 No. 464 (C. 12)])
- The Croydon Tramlink (Penalty Fares) Order 2000 (S.I. 2000 No. 476)
- The Water and Sewerage (Conservation, Access and Recreation) (Code of Practice) Order 2000 (S.I. 2000 No. 477)
- The Financing of Maintained Schools (England) Regulations 2000 (S.I. 2000 No. 478)
- The Community Health Councils Amendment (Wales) Regulations 2000 (S.I. 2000 No.479 (W.20))
- Rheoliadau Cynghorau Iechyd Cymuned Diwygio (Cymru)2000 (S.I. 2000 Rhif 479 (Cy.20))
- The Animals (Scientific Procedures) Act 1986 (Fees) Order 2000 (S.I. 2000 No. 480)
- The Colours in Food (Amendment) (England) Regulations 2000 (S.I. 2000 No. 481)
- The Merchant Shipping (Vessels in Commercial Use for Sport or Pleasure) (Amendment) Regulations 2000 (S.I. 2000 No. 482)
- The Merchant Shipping (Prevention of Oil Pollution) (Amendment) Regulations 2000 (S.I. 2000 No. 483)
- The Merchant Shipping (Safe Manning, Hours of Work and Watchkeeping) (Amendment) Regulations 2000 (S.I. 2000 No. 484)
- The Insolvency (Amendment) Regulations 2000 (S.I. 2000 No. 485)
- The Partnerships (Unrestricted Size) No. 14 Regulations 2000 (S.I. 2000 No. 486)

== 501–600 ==
- The Council Tax (Reduction Scheme) and (Demand Notices Transitional Provisions) (Wales) Regulations 2000 (S.I. 2000 No. 501 (W.21))
- Rheoliadau'r Dreth Gyngor (Cynllun Gostyngiadau) a (Darpariaethau Trosiannol Hysbysiadau Galw am Dalu) (Cymru) 2000 (S.I. 2000 Rhif 501 (Cy.21))
- The Teachers' Pensions (Employers' Supplementary Contributions) Regulations 2000 (S.I. 2000 No. 502)
- The Value Added Tax (Drugs, Medicines, Aids for the Handicapped and Charities Etc.) Order 2000 (S.I. 2000 No. 503)
- The Community Legal Service (Financial) Regulations 2000 (S.I. 2000 No. 516)
- The Water Industry (Charges) (Vulnerable Groups) (Amendment) Regulations 2000 (S.I. 2000 No. 519)
- The Non-Domestic Rating (Unoccupied Property) (England) (Amendment) Regulations 2000 (S.I. 2000 No. 520)
- The Non-Domestic Rating (Rural Settlements) (England) (Amendment) Order 2000 (S.I. 2000 No. 521)
- The East London and The City Mental Health National Health Service Trust (Establishment) Order 2000 (S.I. 2000 No. 522)
- The National Health Service (Professions Supplementary to Medicine) Amendment Regulations 2000 (S.I. 2000 No. 523)
- The Rail Vehicle Accessibility (North Western Trains Class 175/0 and Class 175/1 Vehicles) Exemption Order 2000 (S.I. 2000 No. 524)
- The Central Rating Lists (England) Regulations 2000 (S.I. 2000 No. 525)
- The Social Security Benefits Up-rating Regulations 2000 (S.I. 2000 No. 526)
- The Social Security Benefits Up-rating and Miscellaneous Increases Regulations 2000 (S.I. 2000 No. 527)
- The Social Fund Maternity and Funeral Expenses (General) Amendment Regulations 2000 (S.I. 2000 No. 528)
- The A406 Trunk Road (Gunnersbury Avenue, Hounslow) Red Route (Prescribed Route) Traffic Order 2000 (S.I. 2000 No. 529)
- The A205 Trunk Road (Lewisham) Red Route (Bus Priority) Traffic Order 2000 (S.I. 2000 No. 530)
- The Housing Renewal Grants (Amendment) (England) Regulations 2000 (S.I. 2000 No. 531)
- The Non-Domestic Rating (Miscellaneous Provisions) (No. 2) Regulations 1989 (Amendment) (England) Regulations 2000 (S.I. 2000 No. 532)
- The Housing Benefit (Permitted Totals) (Amendment) Order 2000 (S.I. 2000 No. 533)
- The Council Tax and Non-Domestic Rating (Demand Notices) (England) (Amendment) (No. 2) Regulations 2000 (S.I. 2000 No. 534)
- The East and North Hertfordshire National Health Service Trust (Establishment) Order 2000 (S.I. 2000 No. 535)
- The East Hertfordshire and the North Hertfordshire National Health Service Trusts (Dissolution) Order 2000 (S.I. 2000 No. 536)
- The Council Tax (Liability for Owners) (Amendment) (England) Regulations 2000 (S.I. 2000 No. 537)
- The Housing Renewal Grants (Prescribed Form and Particulars) (Amendment) (England) Regulations 2000 (S.I. 2000 No. 538)
- The Town and Country Planning (Blight Provisions) (England) Order 2000 (S.I. 2000 No. 539)
- The Valuation for Rating (Plant and Machinery) (England) Regulations 2000 (S.I. 2000 No. 540)
- The Asylum Support Appeals (Procedure) Rules 2000 (S.I. 2000 No. 541)
- The Occupational and Personal Pension Schemes (Levy) Amendment Regulations 2000 (S.I. 2000 No. 542)
- The A4 Trunk Road (Hillingdon) Red Route (Clearway) Traffic Order 1996 Variation Order 2000 (S.I. 2000 No. 554)
- The Railtrack plc (Rateable Value) (Wales) Order 2000 (S.I. 2000 No. 555 (W.22))
- Gorchymyn Railtrack plc (Gwerth Ardrethol) (Cymru) 2000 (S.I. 2000 Rhif 555 (Cy.22))
- The Education (Budget Statements) (England) Regulations 2000 (S.I. 2000 No. 576)
- The Food (Animal Products from Belgium) (Emergency Control) (England and Wales) Order 2000 (S.I. 2000 No. 587)
- The Animal Feedingstuffs from Belgium (Control) (England and Wales) Regulations 2000 (S.I. 2000 No. 588)
- The Local Government (Grants from Structural Funds) Regulations 2000 (S.I. 2000 No. 589)
- The Social Security (Incapacity) Miscellaneous Amendments Regulations 2000 (S.I. 2000 No. 590)
- The Public Telecommunication System Designation (Telemonde Networks Limited) Order 2000 (S.I. 2000 No. 591)
- The Medicines for Human Use and Medical Devices (Fees and Miscellaneous Amendments) Regulations 2000 (S.I. 2000 No. 592)
- The National Health Service (Pharmaceutical Services) Amendment (No. 2) Regulations 2000 (S.I. 2000 No. 593)
- The National Health Service (Optical Charges and Payments) Amendment Regulations 2000 (S.I. 2000 No. 594)
- The National Health Service Trusts and Primary Care Trusts (Pharmaceutical Services Remuneration—Special Arrangement) Order 2000 (S.I. 2000 No. 595)
- The National Health Service (Dental Charges) Amendment Regulations 2000 (S.I. 2000 No. 596)
- The Gaming Clubs (Bankers' Games) (Amendment) Regulations 2000 (S.I. 2000 No. 597)
- The Non-Domestic Rating (Alteration of Lists and Appeals) (Amendment) (England) Regulations 2000 (S.I. 2000 No. 598)
- The Civil Aviation (Navigation Services Charges) Regulations 2000 (S.I. 2000 No. 599)
- The Income Tax (Charge to Tax) (Payments out of Surplus Funds) (Relevant Rate) Order 2000 (S.I. 2000 No. 600)

== 601–700 ==
- The National Health Service (General Medical Services) Amendment (No. 2) Regulations 2000 (S.I. 2000 No. 601)
- The National Health Service (Charges to Overseas Visitors) Amendment Regulations 2000 (S.I. 2000 No. 602)
- The National Health Service Supplies Authority (Establishment and Constitution) Amendment Order 2000 (S.I. 2000 No. 603)
- The Health Education Authority (Abolition) Order 2000 (S.I. 2000 No. 604)
- The National Health Service (Pension Scheme and Compensation for Premature Retirement) Amendment Regulations 2000 (S.I. 2000 No. 605)
- The National Health Service (Injury Benefits) Amendment Regulations 2000 (S.I. 2000 No. 606)
- The National Health Service Trusts (Originating Capital) Order 2000 (S.I. 2000 No. 607)
- The Special Trustees for the Former United Sheffield Hospitals (Transfers of Trust Property) Order 2000 (S.I. 2000 No. 608)
- The Sheffield Health Authority (Transfers of Trust Property) Order 2000 (S.I. 2000 No. 609)
- The Special Trustees for the Royal Throat, Nose & Ear Hospital and the Special Trustees for the Royal Free Hospital (Transfers of Trust Property) Order 2000 (S.I. 2000 No. 610)
- The Special Trustees for the University College London Hospitals and the Special Trustees for the Middlesex Hospital (Transfers of Trust Property) Order 2000 (S.I. 2000 No. 611)
- The Special Trustees of the General Infirmary at Leeds and the Leeds St James's University Hospital Special Trustees (Transfers of Trust Property) Order 2000 (S.I. 2000 No. 612)
- The Special Trustees for the Hammersmith and Acton Hospitals, the Special Trustees for the Charing Cross and West London Hospitals and the Special Trustees for the Queen Charlotte's and Chelsea Hospital (Transfers of Trust Property) Order 2000 (S.I. 2000 No. 613)
- The Special Trustees for Guy's Hospital and the Special Trustees for St Thomas' Hospital (Transfers of Trust Property) Order 2000 (S.I. 2000 No. 614)
- The Special Trustees for the United Bristol Hospitals (Transfer of Trust Property) Order 2000 (S.I. 2000 No. 615)
- The Avon Health Authority (Transfer of Trust Property) Order 2000 (S.I. 2000 No. 616)
- NHS Bodies and Local Authorities Partnership Arrangements Regulations 2000 (S.I. 2000 No. 617)
- The National Health Service (Payments by Local Authorities to NHS Bodies) (Prescribed Functions) Regulations 2000 (S.I. 2000 No. 618)
- The National Health Service Pension Scheme (Additional Voluntary Contributions) Regulations 2000 (S.I. 2000 No. 619)
- The National Health Service (Charges for Drugs and Appliances) Regulations 2000 (S.I. 2000 No. 620)
- The National Health Service (Travelling Expenses and Remission of Charges) Amendment Regulations 2000 (S.I. 2000 No. 621)
- The Local Authorities (Members' Allowances) (Amendment) (England) Regulations 2000 (S.I. 2000 No. 622)
- The Local Authorities (Members' Allowances) (Amendment) (England) (No. 2) Regulations 2000 (S.I. 2000 No. 623)
- The Injuries in War (Shore Employments) Compensation (Amendment) Scheme 2000 (S.I. 2000 No. 626)
- The Community Legal Service (Funding) Order 2000 (S.I. 2000 No. 627)
- The Welfare Reform and Pensions Act 1999 (Commencement No. 3) Order 2000 (S.I. 2000 No. 629 (C. 13)])
- The Wireless Telegraphy (Television Licence Fees) (Amendment) Regulations 2000 (S.I. 2000 No. 630)
- The Air Passenger Duty and Other Indirect Taxes (Interest Rate) (Amendment) Regulations 2000 (S.I. 2000 No. 631)
- The Finance Act 1999, Part VII, (Appointed Day) Order 2000 (S.I. 2000 No. 632 (C.14)])
- The Interest on Repayments of Customs Duty (Applicable Period) Order 2000 (S.I. 2000 No. 633)
- The Value Added Tax (Amendment) (No. 2) Regulations 2000 (S.I. 2000 No. 634)
- The Banking Act 1987 (Exempt Transactions) (Amendment) Regulations 2000 (S.I. 2000 No. 635)
- The Social Security (Immigration and Asylum) Consequential Amendments Regulations 2000 (S.I. 2000 No. 636)
- The Social Security (Payments to Reduce Under-occupation) Regulations 2000 (S.I. 2000 No. 637)
- The Housing Benefit (General) Amendment Regulations 2000 (S.I. 2000 No. 638)
- The County Court Fees (Amendment) Order 2000 (S.I. 2000 No. 639 (L.2)])
- The Family Proceedings Fees (Amendment) Order 2000 (S.I. 2000 No. 640 (L.3)])
- The Supreme Court Fees (Amendment) Order 2000 (S.I. 2000 No. 641 (L.4)])
- The Non-Contentious Probate Fees (Amendment) Order 2000 (S.I. 2000 No. 642 (L.5)])
- The Licensed Conveyancers (Compensation for Inadequate Professional Services) Order 2000 (S.I. 2000 No. 643)
- The Solicitors (Compensation for Inadequate Professional Services) Order 2000 (S.I. 2000 No. 644)
- The Excise Goods (Export Shops) Regulations 2000 (S.I. 2000 No. 645)
- The Welfare of Animals (Transport) (Electronic Route Plans Pilot Schemes) (England) Order 2000 (S.I. 2000 No. 646)
- The Buying Agency Trading Fund (Amendment) Order 2000 (S.I. 2000 No. 648)
- The Public Processions (Northern Ireland) Act 1998 (Accounts and Audit) Order 2000 (S.I. 2000 No. 655)
- The Food Standards Act 1999 (Transitional and Consequential Provisions and Savings) (England and Wales) Regulations 2000 (S.I. 2000 No. 656)
- The Community Health Councils (Amendment) Regulations 2000 (S.I. 2000 No. 657)
- The Avon and Western Wiltshire Mental Health Care National Health Service Trust (Transfer of Trust Property) Order 2000 (S.I. 2000 No. 658)
- The Special Health Authorities (Duty of Quality) Regulations 2000 (S.I. 2000 No. 660)
- The National Health Service (Functions of Health Authorities) (Prescribing Incentive Schemes) Amendment Regulations 2000 (S.I. 2000 No. 661)
- The Commission for Health Improvement (Functions) Regulations 2000 (S.I. 2000 No. 662)
- The Teachers (Compensation for Redundancy and Premature Retirement) (Amendment) Regulations 2000 (S.I. 2000 No. 664)
- The Teachers' Pensions (Amendment) Regulations 2000 (S.I. 2000 No. 665)
- The Teachers' Superannuation (Additional Voluntary Contributions) (Amendment) Regulations 2000 (S.I. 2000 No. 666)
- The Social Security Benefit (Computation of Earnings) (Amendment) (Northern Ireland) Regulations 2000 (S.I. 2000 No. 667)
- The Building Societies (General Charge and Fees) Regulations 2000 (S.I. 2000 No. 668)
- The Industrial and Provident Societies (Credit Unions) (Fees) Regulations 2000 (S.I. 2000 No. 669)
- The Insurance (Fees) Regulations 2000 (S.I. 2000 No. 670)
- The Pensions Increase (Scottish Parliamentary Pension Scheme) Regulations 2000 (S.I. 2000 No. 671)
- The Pensions Increase (Review) Order 2000 (S.I. 2000 No. 672)
- The Industrial and Provident Societies (Fees) Regulations 2000 (S.I. 2000 No. 673)
- The Friendly Societies (General Charge and Fees) Regulations 2000 (S.I. 2000 No. 674)
- The Petty Sessions Areas (Amendment) Order 2000 (S.I. 2000 No. 675)
- The Magistrates' Courts Committee Areas (Amendment) Order 2000 (S.I. 2000 No. 676)
- The Justices of the Peace (Commission Areas) (Amendment) Order 2000 (S.I. 2000 No. 677)
- The Social Security (Approved Work) Regulations 2000 (S.I. 2000 No. 678)
- The Occupational Pension Schemes (Miscellaneous Amendments) Regulations 2000 (S.I. 2000 No. 679)
- The Social Security (Miscellaneous Amendments) Regulations 2000 (S.I. 2000 No. 681)
- The Disabled Persons (Badges for Motor Vehicles) (England) Regulations 2000 (S.I. 2000 No. 682)
- The Local Authorities' Traffic Orders (Exemptions for Disabled Persons) (England) Regulations 2000 (S.I. 2000 No. 683)
- The Carriers' Liability (Clandestine Entrants) (Code of Practice) Order 2000 (S.I. 2000 No. 684)
- The Carriers' Liability (Clandestine Entrants and Sale of Transporters) Regulations 2000 (S.I. 2000 No. 685)
- The Transfer of Undertakings (Protection of Employment) (Greater London Authority) Order 2000 (S.I. 2000 No. 686)
- The Scotland Act 1998 (Designation of Receipts) Order 2000 (S.I. 2000 No. 687)
- The Social Security (Maternity Allowance) (Earnings) Regulations 2000 (S.I. 2000 No. 688)
- The Measuring Instruments (EEC Requirements) (Fees) (Amendment) Regulations 2000 (S.I. 2000 No. 689)
- The Social Security (Maternity Allowance) (Work Abroad) (Amendment) (Northern Ireland) Regulations 2000 (S.I. 2000 No. 690)
- The Social Security (Maternity Allowance) (Work Abroad) (Amendment) Regulations 2000 (S.I. 2000 No. 691)
- The Conditional Fee Agreements Regulations 2000 (S.I. 2000 No. 692)
- The Access to Justice (Membership Organisations) Regulations 2000 (S.I. 2000 No. 693)
- The Health Act 1999 (Supplementary, Consequential etc. Provisions) (No. 2) Order 2000 (S.I. 2000 No. 694)
- The Primary Care Trusts (Functions) (England) Regulations 2000 (S.I. 2000 No. 695)
- The Health Authorities (Membership and Procedure) Amendment Regulations 2000 (S.I. 2000 No. 696)
- The Workmen's Compensation (Supplementation) (Amendment) Scheme 2000 (S.I. 2000 No. 697)
- The Dairy Produce Quotas (Amendment) (England) Regulations 2000 (S.I. 2000 No. 698)
- The Road Traffic (Permitted Parking Area and Special Parking Area) (City of Bristol) Order 2000 (S.I. 2000 No. 699)
- The Young Offender Institution (Amendment) Rules 2000 (S.I. 2000 No. 700)

== 701–800 ==
- The Homelessness (England) Regulations 2000 (S.I. 2000 No. 701)
- The Allocation of Housing (England) Regulations 2000 (S.I. 2000 No. 702)
- The Education Standards Fund (England) Regulations 2000 (S.I. 2000 No. 703)
- The Asylum Support Regulations 2000 (S.I. 2000 No. 704)
- The Immigration (Eligibility for Assistance) (Scotland and Northern Ireland) Regulations 2000 (S.I. 2000 No. 705)
- The Persons subject to Immigration Control (Housing Authority Accommodation and Homelessness) Order 2000 (S.I. 2000 No. 706)
- The Airports (Designation) (Removal and Disposal of Vehicles) (Amendment) Order 2000 (S.I. 2000 No. 707)
- The Council Tax (Liability of Owners) (Amendment) (Scotland) Regulations 2000 (S.I. 2000 No. 715 (S. 1)])
- The Local Authorities (Alteration of Requisite Calculations) (Wales) Regulations 2000 (S.I. 2000 No. 717 (W. 24 ))
- Rheoliadau Awdurdodau Lleol (Newid Cyfrifiadau Angenrheidiol) (Cymru) 2000 (S.I. 2000 Rhif 717 (Cy. 24 ))
- The Revenue Support Grant (Specified Bodies) (Wales) Regulations 2000 (S.I. 2000 No. 718 (W.25))
- Rheoliadau Grant Cynnal Refeniw (Cyrff Penodedig) (Cymru) 2000 (S.I. 2000 Rhif 718 (Cy.25))
- The Seeds (Fees) (Amendment) (Wales) Regulations 2000 (S.I. 2000 No.719 (W.26))
- Rheoliadau Hadau (Ffioedd) (Diwygio) (Cymru) 2000 (S.I. 2000 Rhif 719 (Cy.26))
- The Relocation Grants (Form of Application) (Amendment) (England) Regulations 2000 (S.I. 2000 No. 720)
- The Employment Zones Regulations 2000 (S.I. 2000 No. 721)
- The Road Traffic (Permitted Parking Area and Special Parking Area) (County of Kent) (District of Shepway) Order 2000 (S.I. 2000 No. 722)
- The Social Security (Contributions) (Amendment No. 2) Regulations 2000 (S.I. 2000 No. 723)
- The Social Security Amendment (Employment Zones) Regulations 2000 (S.I. 2000 No. 724)
- The Motor Vehicles (Compulsory Insurance) Regulations 2000 (S.I. 2000 No. 726)
- The Social Security Contributions (Intermediaries) Regulations 2000 (S.I. 2000 No. 727)
- The Social Security Contributions (Intermediaries) (Northern Ireland) Regulations 2000 (S.I. 2000 No. 728)
- The Social Fund Winter Fuel Payment Regulations 2000 (S.I. 2000 No. 729)
- The Radio Equipment and Telecommunications Terminal Equipment Regulations 2000 (S.I. 2000 No. 730)
- The Data Protection Tribunal (National Security Appeals) (Telecommunications) Rules 2000 (S.I. 2000 No. 731)
- The West Hertfordshire Hospitals National Health Service Trust (Establishment) Order 2000 (S.I. 2000 No. 732)
- The Mount Vernon and Watford Hospitals and the St. Albans and Hemel Hempstead National Health Service Trusts (Dissolution) Order 2000 (S.I. 2000 No. 733)
- The Road Traffic Reduction Act 1997 (Commencement) (England and Wales) Order 2000 (S.I. 2000 No. 735 (c. 15)])
- The Social Security (Contributions) (Amendment No. 3)Regulations 2000 (S.I. 2000 No. 736)
- The Social Security (Contributions) (Amendment No. 3) (Northern Ireland) Regulations 2000 (S.I. 2000 No. 737)
- The European Communities (Designation) Order 2000 (S.I. 2000 No. 738)
- The Parliamentary Commissioner Order 2000 (S.I. 2000 No. 739)
- The Films Co-Production Agreements (Amendment) Order 2000 (S.I. 2000 No. 740)
- The Northern Ireland Act 1998 (Modification) Order 2000 (S.I. 2000 No. 741)
- The Appropriation (Northern Ireland) Order 2000 (S.I. 2000 No. 742 (N.I. 1)])
- The Chemical Weapons Act 1996 (Guernsey) Order 2000 (S.I. 2000 No. 743)
- The Census Order 2000 (S.I. 2000 No. 744)
- The Scotland Act 1998 (Agency Arrangements) (Specification) Order 2000 (S.I. 2000 No. 745)
- The Scotland Act 1998 (Cross-Border Public Authorities) (Forestry Commissioners) Order 2000 (S.I. 2000 No. 746)
- The Social Security Contributions (Notional Payment of Primary Class 1 Contribution) Regulations 2000 (S.I. 2000 No. 747)
- The Social Security Contributions (Notional Payment of Primary Class 1 Contribution) (Northern Ireland) Regulations 2000 (S.I. 2000 No. 748)
- The Personal and Occupational Pension Schemes (Incentive Payments) Amendment Regulations 2000 (S.I. 2000 No. 749)
- The Occupational Pension Schemes (Contracting-out) (Payment and Recovery of Remaining Balances)Regulations 2000 (S.I. 2000 No. 750)
- The Social Security (Contributions) (Re-rating and National Insurance Funds Payments) Order 2000 (S.I. 2000 No. 755)
- The Films (Modification of the Definition of British Film) Order 2000 (S.I. 2000 No. 756)
- The Social Security (Contributions) (Re-rating) Consequential Amendment (Northern Ireland) Regulations 2000 (S.I. 2000 No. 757)
- The Social Security (Contributions) (Amendment No. 4) (Northern Ireland) Regulations 2000 (S.I. 2000 No. 758)
- The Charitable Deductions (Approved Schemes) (Amendment) Regulations 2000 (S.I. 2000 No. 759)
- The Social Security (Contributions) (Re-rating) Consequential Amendment Regulations 2000 (S.I. 2000 No. 760)
- The Social Security (Contributions) (Amendment No. 4) Regulations 2000 (S.I. 2000 No. 761)
- The Genetically Modified and Novel Foods (Labelling) (England) Regulations 2000 (S.I. 2000 No. 768)
- The A205 Trunk Road (Lewisham) Red Route Traffic Order 1998 Variation Order 2000 (S.I. 2000 No. 769)
- The Rail Vehicle Accessibility (Gatwick Express Class 460 Vehicles) Exemption Order 2000 (S.I. 2000 No. 770)
- The Access to Justice Act 1999 (Commencement No. 3, Transitional Provisions and Savings) Order 2000 (S.I. 2000 No. 774 (C.16)])
- The Marketing Authorisations for Veterinary Medicinal Products Amendment Regulations 2000 (S.I. 2000 No. 776)
- The A205 Trunk Road (Greenwich) Red Route Traffic Order 1998 Variation Order 2000 (S.I. 2000 No. 777)
- The A4 Trunk Road (Hillingdon and Hounslow) Red Route Traffic Order 1997 Variation Order 2000 (S.I. 2000 No. 778)
- The Health Act 1999 (Commencement No. 8) Order 2000 (S.I. 2000 No. 779 (C. 17)])
- The London Borough of Barking and Dagenham (Electoral Changes) Order 2000 (S.I. 2000 No. 780)
- The London Borough of Croydon (Electoral Changes) Order 2000 (S.I. 2000 No. 781)
- The London Borough of Hackney (Electoral Changes) Order 2000 (S.I. 2000 No. 782)
- The London Borough of Haringey (Electoral Changes) Order 2000 (S.I. 2000 No. 783)
- The London Borough of Islington (Electoral Changes) Order 2000 (S.I. 2000 No. 784)
- The Royal Borough of Kensington and Chelsea (Electoral Changes) Order 2000 (S.I. 2000 No. 785)
- The London Borough of Southwark(Electoral Changes) Order 2000 (S.I. 2000 No. 786)
- The London Borough of Tower Hamlets (Electoral Changes) Order 2000 (S.I. 2000 No. 787)
- The City of Westminster (Electoral Changes) Order 2000 (S.I. 2000 No. 788)
- The Greater London Authority Elections (Expenses) Order 2000 (S.I. 2000 No. 789)
- The Meat Products (Hygiene) (Amendment) (England) Regulations 2000 (S.I. 2000 No. 790)
- The Road Traffic (Permitted Parking Area and Special Parking Area) (Metropolitan Borough of Sandwell) Order 2000 (S.I. 2000 No. 791)
- The Non-Domestic Rating (Alteration of Lists and Appeals) (Amendment) (Wales) Regulations 2000 (S.I. 2000 No. 792 (W. 29))
- Rheoliadau Ardrethu Annomestig (Newid Rhestri ac Apelau) (Diwygio) (Cymru) 2000 (S.I. 2000 Rhif 792 (Cy. 29))
- The Non-Domestic Rating (Demand Notices) (Amendment) (Wales) Regulations 2000 (S.I. 2000 No. 793 (W. 30))
- Rheoliadau Ardrethu Annomestig (Hysbysiadau Galw am Dalu) (Diwygio) (Cymru) 2000 (S.I. 2000 Rhif 793 (Cy. 30))
- The Value Added Tax (Amendment) (No. 3) Regulations 2000 (S.I. 2000 No. 794)
- The Tax Credits Schemes (Miscellaneous Amendments) Regulations 2000 (S.I. 2000 No. 795)
- The Tax Credits Schemes (Miscellaneous Amendments) (Northern Ireland) Regulations 2000 (S.I. 2000 No. 796)
- The Commission for Health Improvement (Functions) Amendment Regulations 2000 (S.I. 2000 No. 797)
- The National Assistance (Sums for Personal Requirements) Regulations 2000 (S.I. 2000 No. 798)
- The Social Security (Overlapping Benefits) Amendment Regulations 2000 (S.I. 2000 No. 799)
- The Pollution Prevention and Control Act 1999 (Commencement No. 1) (England and Wales) Order 2000 (S.I. 2000 No. 800 (C. 18))

== 801–900 ==
- The Greater London Authority Act 1999 (Commencement No. 4 and Adaptation) Order 2000 (S.I. 2000 No. 801 (C. 19)])
- The Value Added Tax (Fund-Raising Events by Charities and Other Qualifying Bodies) Order 2000 (S.I. 2000 No. 802)
- The Inheritance Tax (Indexation) Order 2000 (S.I. 2000 No. 803)
- The Value Added Tax (Increase of Registration Limits) Order 2000 (S.I. 2000 No. 804)
- The Value Added Tax (Charities and Aids for the Handicapped) Order 2000 (S.I. 2000 No. 805)
- The Income Tax (Indexation) Order 2000 (S.I. 2000 No. 806)
- The Retirement Benefits Schemes (Indexation of Earnings Cap) Order 2000 (S.I. 2000 No. 807)
- The Capital Gains Tax (Annual Exempt Amount) Order 2000 (S.I. 2000 No. 808)
- The Individual Savings Account (Amendment) Regulations 2000 (S.I. 2000 No. 809)
- The Income Tax (Cash Equivalents of Car Fuel Benefits) Order 2000 (S.I. 2000 No. 810)
- The Value Added Tax (Increase of Consideration for Fuel) Order 2000 (S.I. 2000 No. 811)
- The Community Legal Service (Scope) Regulations 2000 (S.I. 2000 No. 822)
- The Conditional Fee Agreements Order 2000 (S.I. 2000 No. 823)
- The Community Legal Service (Cost Protection) Regulations 2000 (S.I. 2000 No. 824)
- The Local Authorities (Capital Finance) (Rate of Discount for 2000/2001) (Wales) Regulations 2000 (S.I. 2000 No.825 (W.31))
- Rheoliadau Awdurdodau Lleol (Cyllid Cyfalaf) (Cyfradd y Gostyngiad ar gyfer 2000/2001) (Cymru) 2000 (S.I. 2000 Rhif 825 (Cy.31))
- The Greater London Authority Election (Early Voting) Order 2000 (S.I. 2000 No. 826)
- The Sea Fishing (Enforcement of Community Quota and Third Country Fishing Measures) Order 2000 (S.I. 2000 No. 827)
- The Agricultural or Forestry Tractors and Tractor Components (Type Approval) (Amendment) Regulations 2000 (S.I. 2000 No. 828)
- The A1 Trunk Road (Islington) Red Route (Bus Priority) Traffic Order 1999 Experimental Variation Order 2000 (S.I. 2000 No. 830)
- The Environmental Protection (Waste Recycling Payments) (Amendment) (England) Regulations 2000 (S.I. 2000 No. 831)
- The Income Support (General) (Standard Interest Rate Amendment) Regulations 2000 (S.I. 2000 No. 832)
- The Occupational and Personal Pension Schemes (Penalties) Regulations 2000 (S.I. 2000 No. 833)
- The Education (Education Standards Grants) (Wales) Regulations 2000 (S.I. 2000 No. 834 (W. 32))
- Rheoliadau Addysg (Grantiau Safonau Addysg) (Cymru) 2000 (S.I. 2000 Rhif 834 (Cy. 32))
- Prevention of Terrorism (Temporary Provisions) Act 1989 (Continuance) Order 2000 (S.I. 2000 No. 835)
- The Merchant Shipping (Training and Certification) (Amendment) Regulations 2000 (S.I. 2000 No. 836)
- The National Health Service (Travelling Expenses and Remission of Charges) Amendment (No. 2) Regulations 2000 (S.I. 2000 No. 837)
- The Education Maintenance Allowance (Pilot Areas) (Amendment) Regulations 2000 (S.I. 2000 No. 838)
- The Electricity (Standards of Performance) (Amendment) Regulations 2000 (S.I. 2000 No. 840)
- The Stockport Acute Services and the Stockport Healthcare National Health Service Trusts (Dissolution) Order 2000 (S.I. 2000 No. 841)
- The Stockport National Health Service Trust (Establishment) Order 2000 (S.I. 2000 No. 842)
- The Police Pensions (Amendment) Regulations 2000 (S.I. 2000 No. 843)
- Charities (Boxmoor Estate, Hemel Hempstead) Order 2000 (S.I. 2000 No. 844)
- The Medical Food (England) Regulations 2000 (S.I. 2000 No. 845)
- The Phoenix National Health Service Trust (Dissolution) Order 2000 (S.I. 2000 No. 846)
- The Andover District Community Health Care National Health Service Trust (Dissolution) Order 2000 (S.I. 2000 No. 847)
- The Relevant Functions (Payments to Authorities) Order 2000 (S.I. 2000 No. 848)
- Trafford Park Railway Order 2000 (S.I. 2000 No. 849)
- The M11 Motorway (Junction 5–4, Redbridge) (Speed Limit) Regulations 2000 (S.I. 2000 No. 854)
- The Leeds Teaching Hospitals National Health Service Trust (Transfer of Trust Property) Order 2000 (S.I. 2000 No. 859)
- The University College London Hospitals National Health Service Trust (Transfer of Trust Property) Order 2000 (S.I. 2000 No. 860)
- The Hammersmith Hospitals National Health Service Trust (Transfer of Trust Property) Order 2000 (S.I. 2000 No. 861)
- The Greater London Authority Act 1999 (Transitional Capital Finance Provisions) Order 2000 (S.I. 2000 No. 862)
- The Action for Education and Employment South East Sheffield Education Action Zone Order 2000 (S.I. 2000 No. 863)
- The Derby North East Education Action Zone Order 2000 (S.I. 2000 No. 864)
- The Bristol Education Action Zone Order 2000 (S.I. 2000 No. 865)
- The North Stockton Community Education Action Zone Order 2000 (S.I. 2000 No. 866)
- The Great Yarmouth Achievement Education Action Zone Order 2000 (S.I. 2000 No. 867)
- The Education (School Teachers' Pay and Conditions) Order 2000 (S.I. 2000 No. 868)
- The Motor Vehicles (EC Type Approval) (Amendment) Regulations 2000 (S.I. 2000 No. 869)
- The Health Service Medicines(Price Control Appeals) Amendment Regulations 2000 (S.I. 2000 No. 870)
- The A4 Trunk Road (Great West Road and Boston Park Road, Hounslow) (Prohibition of Traffic Movements) Order 2000 (S.I. 2000 No. 871)
- The A4 Trunk Road (Great West Road and Boston Manor Road, Hounslow) (Prohibition of Traffic Movements) Order 2000 (S.I. 2000 No. 872)
- The A4 Trunk Road (Great West Road and Riverbank Way, Hounslow) (Prescribed Routes) Order 2000 (S.I. 2000 No. 873)
- The Lobsters and Crawfish (Prohibition of Fishing and Landing) Order 2000 (S.I. 2000 No. 874)
- The Employment Relations Act 1999 (Commencement No. 5 and Transitional Provision) Order 2000 (S.I. 2000 No. 875 (C. 20)])
- The South Peterborough Primary Care Trust (Establishment) Amendment Order 2000 (S.I. 2000 No. 876)
- The North Peterborough Primary Care Trust (Establishment) Amendment Order 2000 (S.I. 2000 No. 877)
- The Milk Development Council (Amendment) Order 2000 (S.I. 2000 No. 878)
- Disability Rights Commission (Time Limits) Regulations 2000 (S.I. 2000 No. 879)
- The Disability Rights Commission Act 1999 (Commencement No. 2 and Transitional Provision) Order 2000 (S.I. 2000 No. 880 (C. 21)])
- The Charities (Corporation of the Hall of Arts and Sciences) Order 2000 (S.I. 2000 No. 891)
- The Corporation Tax (Instalment Payments) (Amendment) Regulations 2000 (S.I. 2000 No. 892)
- The Taxes (Interest Rate) (Amendment) Regulations 2000 (S.I. 2000 No. 893)
- The Civil Aviation (Route Charges for Navigation Services) (Amendment) Regulations 2000 (S.I. 2000 No. 895)
- The Local Government (Best Value) Performance Indicators Order 2000 (S.I. 2000 No. 896)
- The Social Security (Work-focused Interviews) Regulations 2000 (S.I. 2000 No. 897)
- The Contracting Out (Functions relating to Social Security) Order 2000 (S.I. 2000 No. 898)
- The Gaming Clubs (Hours and Charges) (Amendment) Regulations 2000 (S.I. 2000 No. 899)
- The Access to Justice Act 1999 (Transitional Provisions) Order 2000 (S.I. 2000 No. 900)

== 901–1000 ==
- The Structural Funds (National Assembly for Wales) Regulations 2000 (S.I. 2000 No. 906)
- The Teachers' Pensions (Contributable Salary) Regulations 2000 (S.I. 2000 No.907)
- The Non-Domestic Rating (Miscellaneous Provisions) (No. 2) (Amendment) (Wales) Regulations 2000 (S.I. 2000 No. 908 (W. 39))
- Rheoliadau Ardrethu Annomestig (Darpariaethau Amrywiol) (Rhif 2) (Diwygio) (Cymru) 2000 (S.I. 2000 Rhif 908 (Cy. 39 ))
- The National Health Service (Charges to Overseas Visitors) Amendment (No. 2) Regulations 2000 (S.I. 2000 No. 909)
- The Housing Renewal Grants (Amendment No. 2) (England) Regulations 2000 (S.I. 2000 No. 910)
- The Financing of Maintained Schools (Amendment) (Wales) Regulations 2000 (S.I. 2000 No. 911 (W. 40))
- Rheoliadau Ariannu Ysgolion a Gynhelir (Diwygio) (Cymru) 2000 (S.I. 2000 Rhif 911 (Cy. 40))
- The Immigration (Passenger Information) Order 2000 (S.I. 2000 No. 912)
- The Channel Tunnel (International Arrangements) (Amendment) Order 2000 (S.I. 2000 No. 913)
- The Control of Misleading Advertisements (Amendment) Regulations 2000 (S.I. 2000 No. 914)
- The Income and Corporation Taxes Act 1988, Section 559(4A), Order 2000 (S.I. 2000 No. 921)
- The Finance Act 1995, Section 139(3), (Appointed Day) Order 2000 (S.I. 2000 No. 922 (C.22)])
- The Education (Student Support) (European Institutions) (Amendment) Regulations 2000 (S.I. 2000 No. 923)
- The Crime and Disorder Act 1998 (Commencement No. 7) Order 2000 (S.I. 2000 No. 924 (C.24)])
- The Air Quality (England) Regulations 2000 (S.I. 2000 No. 928)
- The Education (School Teachers' Pay and Conditions) (No. 2) Order 2000 (S.I. 2000 No. 929)
- The Food Safety (General Food Hygiene) (Butchers' Shops) Amendment Regulations 2000 (S.I. 2000 No. 930)
- The Tax Credits Up-rating Order 2000 (S.I. 2000 No. 931)
- The Weighing Equipment (Non-automatic Weighing Machines) Regulations 2000 (S.I. 2000 No. 932)
- The Public Lending Right Scheme 1982 (Commencement of Variations) Order 2000 (S.I. 2000 No. 933)
- The Greenwich Park (Vehicle Parking) Regulations 2000 (S.I. 2000 No. 934)
- The Public Finance and Accountability (Scotland) Act 2000 (Transfer of NAO Staff etc.) Order 2000 (S.I. 2000 No. 935 (S. 2)])
- The Non-Domestic Rating (Chargeable Amounts) (Amendment) (England) Regulations 2000 (S.I. 2000 No. 936)
- The Supreme Court Fees (Amendment No. 2) Order 2000 (S.I. 2000 No. 937 (L. 6)])
- The Family Proceedings Fees (Amendment No. 2) Order 2000 (S.I. 2000 No. 938 (L. 7)])
- The County Court Fees (Amendment No. 2) Order 2000 (S.I. 2000 No. 939 (L.8)])
- The Civil Procedure (Amendment No. 2) Rules 2000 (S.I. 2000 No. 940 (L. 9)])
- The Civil Procedure (Modification of Enactments) Order 2000 (S.I. 2000 No. 941)
- The London Government (Various Provisions) Order 2000 (S.I. 2000 No. 942)
- The A249 Trunk Road (Bobbing Junction) (Detrunking) Order 2000 (S.I. 2000 No. 943)
- Education (Student Loans) (Repayment) Regulations 2000 (S.I. 2000 No. 944)
- The Income Tax (Electronic Communications) Regulations 2000 (S.I. 2000 No. 945)
- The Gas Industry (Rateable Values) (England) Order 2000 (S.I. 2000 No. 946)
- The Electricity Supply Industry (Rateable Values) (England) Order 2000 (S.I. 2000 No. 947)
- The Docks and Harbours (Rateable Values) (Wales) Order 2000 (S.I. 2000 No. 948 (W. 41))
- Gorchymyn Dociau a Harbyrau (Gwerthoedd Ardrethol) (Cymru) 2000 (S.I. 2000 Rhif 948 (Cy. 41))
- The Railways (Rateable Values) (England) Order 2000 (S.I. 2000 No. 949)
- The Water Undertakers (Rateable Values)(England) Order 2000 (S.I. 2000 No. 950)
- The Docks and Harbours (Rateable Values) (England) Order 2000 (S.I. 2000 No. 951)
- The Energy from Waste Plants (Rateable Values) (England) Order 2000 (S.I. 2000 No. 952)
- The Tetrachloroethylene in Olive Oil (Revocation) Regulations 2000 (S.I. 2000 No. 960)
- The Oxford Radcliffe Hospitals National Health Service Trust (Establishment) Amendment Order 2000 (S.I. 2000 No. 961)
- The Public Record Office (Fees) (Amendment) Regulations 2000 (S.I. 2000 No. 964)
- The Inheritance Tax (Delivery of Accounts) (Northern Ireland) Regulations 2000 (S.I. 2000 No. 965)
- The Inheritance Tax (Delivery of Accounts) (Scotland) Regulations 2000 (S.I. 2000 No. 966)
- The Inheritance Tax (Delivery of Accounts) Regulations 2000 (S.I. 2000 No. 967)
- Official Listing of Securities (Change of Competent Authority) Regulations 2000 (S.I. 2000 No. 968)
- The Northumbrian Water and Essex and Suffolk Water (Amendment of Local Enactments Etc.) Order 2000 (S.I. 2000 No. 969)
- The Teaching and Higher Education Act 1998 (Commencement No. 6) Order 2000 (S.I. 2000 No. 970 (C. 24)])
- The Policyholders Protection Act 1997 (Commencement No. 1) Order 2000 (S.I. 2000 No. 971 (C. 25)])
- The Dairy Produce Quotas (Amendment) (Wales) Regulations 2000 (S.I. 2000 No. 972 (W. 42))
- Rheoliadau Cwotâu Cynhyrchion Llaeth (Diwygio) (Cymru) 2000 (S.I. 2000 Rhif 972 (Cy. 42))
- The Housing Renewal Grants (Amendment) (Wales) Regulations 2000 (S.I. 2000 No. 973 (W. 43))
- Rheoliadau Grantiau Adnewyddu Tai (Diwygio) (Cymru) 2000 (S.I. 2000 Rhif 973 (Cy. 43 ))
- The Pencoed College (Dissolution) Order 2000 (S.I. 2000 No. 974 (W. 44))
- Gorchymyn Coleg Pencoed (Diddymu) 2000 (S.I. 2000 Rhif 974 (Cy. 44 ))
- The Rates and Precepts (Final Adjustments) (Amendment) (Wales) Order 2000 (S.I. 2000 No. 975 (W.45))
- Gorchymyn Ardrethi a Phraeseptau (Addasiadau Terfynol) (Diwygio) (Cymru) 2000 (S.I. 2000 Rhif 975 (Cy.45))
- The Sea Fishing (Enforcement of Measures for the Recovery of the Stock of Cod)(Irish Sea) (Wales) Order 2000 (S.I. 2000 No. 976 (W. 46 ))
- Gorchymyn Pysgota Môr (Gorfodi Mesurau ar gyfer Adfer y Stoc Penfreision) (Môr Iwerddon) (Cymru) 2000 (S.I. 2000 Rhif 976 (Cy. 46 ))
- The National Health Service (Dental Charges) Amendment (Wales) Regulations 2000 (S.I. 2000 No. 977 (W. 47 ))
- Rheoliadau'r Gwasanaeth Iechyd Gwladol (Ffioedd Deintyddol) Diwygio (Cymru) 2000 (S.I. 2000 Rhif 977 (Cy. 47 ))
- The National Health Service (Optical Charges and Payments) Amendment (Wales) Regulations 2000 (S.I. 2000 No. 978 (W. 48 ))
- Rheoliadau'r Gwasanaeth Iechyd Gwladol (Ffioedd a Thaliadau Optegol) Diwygio (Cymru) 2000 (S.I. 2000 Rhif 978 (Cy. 48 ))
- The Income-related Benefits and Jobseeker's Allowance (Amendment) Regulations 2000 (S.I. 2000 No. 979)
- The A4 Trunk Road (Bath Road, Hillingdon) (Prohibition of U-Turns) Order 2000 (S.I. 2000 No. 980)
- The A4 Trunk Road (Bath Road, Hillingdon) (Bus Lane) Order 2000 (S.I. 2000 No. 981)
- The Local Authorities (Discretionary Expenditure Limits) (Wales) Order 2000 (S.I. 2000 No. 990 (W. 51))
- Gorchymyn Awdurdodau Lleol (Terfynau Gwariant Dewisol) (Cymru) 2000 (S.I. 2000 Rhif 990 (Cy. 51))
- The National Assembly for Wales (Transfer of Property etc.) Order 2000 (S.I. 2000 No.991)
- The Local Authorities (Capital Finance) (Amendment) (Wales) Regulations 2000 (S.I. 2000 No. 992 (W. 52))
- Rheoliadau Awdurdodau Lleol (Cyllid Cyfalaf) (Diwygio) (Cymru) 2000 (S.I. 2000 Rhif 992 (Cy. 52))
- The Blackpool, Wyre and Fylde Community Health Services National Health Service Trust (Establishment) Amendment Order 2000 (S.I. 2000 No. 993)
- The Dual-Use and Related Goods (Export Control) (Amendment) Regulations 2000 (S.I. 2000 No. 994)
- The Financial Assistance For Industry (Increase of Limit) Order 2000 (S.I. 2000 No. 995)
- The Health Act 1999 (Fund-holding Practices) (Transfer of Assets, Savings, Rights and Liabilities and Transitional Provisions) (Wales) Order 2000 (S.I. 2000 No. 999 (W. 56))
- Gorchymyn Deddf Iechyd 1999 (Practisiau Deiliad-cronfa) (Trosglwyddo Asedau, Arbedion, Hawliau a Rhwymedigaethau a Darpariaethau Trosiannol) (Cymru) 2000. (S.I. 2000 Rhif 999 (Cy.56))
- Teacher Training Agency (Additional Functions) Order 2000 (S.I. 2000 No. 1000)

== 1001–1100 ==
- The Education (Induction Arrangements for School Teachers) (Amendment) (England) Regulations 2000 (S.I. 2000 No. 1001)
- The Local Government Pension Scheme (Amendment) Regulations 2000 (S.I. 2000 No. 1005)
- The Wireless Telegraphy (Exemption) (Amendment) Regulations 2000 (S.I. 2000 No. 1012)
- The Wireless Telegraphy (Citizens' Band and Amateur Apparatus) (Various Provisions) (Amendment) Order 2000 (S.I. 2000 No. 1013)
- The Wireless Telegraphy (Cordless Telephone Apparatus) (Restriction and Marking) (Amendment) Order 2000 (S.I. 2000 No. 1014)
- The Commission for Health Improvement (Functions) (Wales) Regulations 2000 (S.I. 2000 No. 1015 (W. 57))
- Rheoliadau'r Comisiwn Gwella Iechyd (Swyddogaethau) (Cymru) 2000 (S.I. 2000 Rhif 1015 (Cy. 57))
- The Consular Fees (Amendment) Regulations 2000 (S.I. 2000 No. 1017)
- The Westminster Education Action Zone Order 2000 (S.I. 2000 No. 1022)
- The Council Tax (Liability for Owners) (Amendment) (Wales) Regulations 2000 (S.I. 2000 No. 1024 (W. 60))
- Rheoliadau Treth Gyngor (Atebolrwydd Perchnogion i Dalu) (Diwygio) (Cymru) 2000 (S.I. 2000 Rhif 1024 (Cy. 60))
- The Council Tax (Exempt Dwellings) (Amendment) (Wales) Order 2000 (S.I. 2000 No. 1025 (W. 61))
- Gorchymyn Treth Gyngor (Anheddau Esempt) (Diwygio) (Cymru) 2000 (S.I. 2000 Rhif 1025 (Cy. 61))
- The Health Act 1999 (Commencement No. 2) (Wales) Order 2000 (S.I. 2000 No. 1026 (W.62) (C.26))
- Gorchymyn Deddf Iechyd 1999 (Cychwyn Rhif 2) (Cymru) 2000 (S.I. 2000 Rhif 1026 (Cy.62)(C.26))
- The Local Authorities (Goods and Services) (Public Bodies) (No. 2) Order 2000 (S.I. 2000 No. 1027)
- The Local Government (Best Value) (Exemption) (Wales) Order 2000 (S.I. 2000 No. 1029 (W. 64))
- Gorchymyn Llywodraeth Leol (Gwerth Gorau) (Eithrio) (Cymru) 2000 (S.I. 2000 Rhif 1029 (Cy. 64))
- The Local Government (Best Value Performance Indicators) (Wales) Order 2000 (S.I. 2000 No. 1030 (W. 65))
- Gorchymyn Llywodraeth Leol (Dangosyddion Perfformiad Gwerth Gorau) (Cymru) 2000 (S.I. 2000 Rhif 1030 (Cy. 65))
- Yorkshire Water and York Waterworks (Amendment of Local Enactments Etc.) Order 2000 (S.I. 2000 No. 1031)
- The Greater London Authority (Limitation of Salaries) Order 2000 (S.I. 2000 No. 1032)
- The Local Authorities (Capital Finance, Approved Investments and Contracts) (Amendment) Regulations 2000 (S.I. 2000 No. 1033)
- The Youth Justice and Criminal Evidence Act 1999 (Commencement No. 2) Order 2000 (S.I. 2000 No. 1034 (C. 27)])
- The National Health Service (Functions of Health Authorities and Administration Arrangements)(Wales) Amendment Regulations 2000 (S.I. 2000 No. 1035 (W. 66))
- Rheoliadau Diwygio Rheoliadau'r Gwasanaeth Iechyd Gwladol (Swyddogaethau Awdurdodau Iechyd a Threfniadau Gweinyddu) (Cymru) 2000 (S.I. 2000 Rhif 1035 (Cy. 66))
- The Persons Subject to Immigration Control (Housing Authority Accommodation) (Wales) Order 2000 (S.I. 2000 No. 1036 (W. 67))
- Gorchymyn Personau sy'n Ddarostyngedig i Reolaeth Fewnfudo (Llety Awdurdodau Tai) (Cymru) 2000 (S.I. 2000 Rhif 1036 (Cy. 67))
- The General Osteopathic Council (Restoration to the Register of Conditionally Registered Osteopaths) Rules Order of Council 2000 (S.I. 2000 No. 1037)
- The General Osteopathic Council (Application for Registration and Fees) Rules Order of Council 2000 (S.I. 2000 No. 1038)
- The Home Energy Efficiency Scheme (Amendment) (Wales) Regulations 2000 (S.I. 2000 No. 1039 (W. 68))
- Rheoliadau'r Cynllun Effeithlonrwydd Ynni Cartref (Diwygio) (Cymru) 2000 (S.I. 2000 Rhif 1039 (Cy. 68))
- The Greater London Authority Elections (No. 2) (Amendment) Rules 2000 (S.I. 2000 No. 1040)
- The Health Act 1999 (Commencement No. 9) Order 2000 (S.I. 2000 No. 1041 (C. 28)])
- The London Government (Continuity of Employment) Order 2000 (S.I. 2000 No. 1042)
- The Environmental Protection (Disposal of Polychlorinated Biphenyls and other Dangerous Substances) (England and Wales) Regulations 2000 (S.I. 2000 No. 1043)
- The Woolwich Ferry Order 2000 (S.I. 2000 No. 1044)
- The Transport for London (Preliminary Arrangements) Order 2000 (S.I. 2000 No. 1045)
- The Value Added Tax (Refund of Tax) Order 2000 (S.I. 2000 No. 1046)
- The Welfare Reform and Pensions Act 1999 (Commencement No. 4) Order 2000 (S.I. 2000 No. 1047 (C. 29)])
- The Pensions on Divorce etc. (Provision of Information) Regulations 2000 (S.I. 2000 No. 1048)
- The Pensions on Divorce etc. (Charging) Regulations 2000 (S.I. 2000 No. 1049)
- The Divorce etc. (Notification and Treatment of Pensions) (Scotland) Regulations 2000 (S.I. 2000 No. 1050 (S.4)])
- The Pensions on Divorce etc. (Pension Sharing) (Scotland) Regulations 2000 (S.I. 2000 No. 1051 (S.5)])
- The Pension Sharing (Valuation) Regulations 2000 (S.I. 2000 No. 1052)
- The Pension Sharing (Implementation and Discharge of Liability) Regulations 2000 (S.I. 2000 No. 1053)
- The Pension Sharing (Pension Credit Benefit) Regulations 2000 (S.I. 2000 No. 1054)
- The Pension Sharing (Safeguarded Rights) Regulations 2000 (S.I. 2000 No. 1055)
- The Ionising Radiation (Medical Exposure) Regulations 2000 (S.I. 2000 No. 1059)
- The GLA Roads (Supplementary Provisions) Order 2000 (S.I. 2000 No. 1064)
- The Osteopaths Act 1993 (Commencement No. 6 and Transitional Provision) Order 2000 (S.I. 2000 No. 1065 (C. 30)])
- The Food Standards Act 1999 (Commencement No. 2) Order 2000 (S.I. 2000 No. 1066 (C.31)])
- The Medicines (Sale or Supply) (Miscellaneous Provisions) Amendment Regulations 2000 (S.I. 2000 No. 1070)
- The Access to Justice Act 1999 (Destination of Appeals) Order 2000 (S.I. 2000 No. 1071 (L. 10)])
- The Petroleum Revenue Tax (Nomination Scheme for Disposals and Appropriations) (Amendment) Regulations 2000 (S.I. 2000 No. 1072)
- The A421 Trunk Road (Marsh Leys Improvement) (Detrunking) Order 2000 (S.I. 2000 No. 1073)
- The A421 Trunk Road (Marsh Leys Improvement) (Trunking) Order 2000 (S.I. 2000 No. 1074)
- The Sea Fishing (Enforcement of Community Control Measures) (Wales) Order 2000 (S.I. 2000 No. 1075 (W.69))
- Gorchymyn Pysgota Môr (Gorfodi Mesurau Rheoli'r Gymuned) (Cymru) 2000 (S.I. 2000 Rhif 1075 (Cy.69))
- The Bro Morgannwg National Health Service Trust (Establishment) Amendment Order 2000 (S.I. 2000 No. 1076 (W. 70 ))
- Gorchymyn Diwygio Gorchymyn Ymddiriedolaeth Gwasanaeth Iechyd Gwladol Bro Morgannwg (Sefydlu) 2000 (S.I. 2000 Rhif 1076 (Cy. 70 ))
- The Smoke Control Areas (Authorised Fuels) (Amendment) (England) Regulations 2000 (S.I. 2000 No. 1077)
- The Sea Fishing (Enforcement of Community Satellite Monitoring Measures) (Wales) Order 2000 (S.I. 2000 No. 1078 (W. 71))
- Gorchymyn Pysgota Môr (Gorfodi Mesurau Cymunedol ar gyfer Monitro â Lloeren) (Cymru) 2000 (S.I. 2000 Rhif 1078 (Cy. 71))
- The Homelessness (Wales) Regulations 2000 (S.I. 2000 No. 1079 (W. 72))
- Rheoliadau Digartrefedd (Cymru) 2000 (S.I. 2000 Rhif 1079 (Cy. 72))
- The Allocation of Housing (Wales) Regulations 2000 (S.I. 2000 No. 1080 (W. 73))
- Rheoliadau Dyrannu Tai (Cymru) 2000 (S.I. 2000 Rhif 1080 (Cy. 73))
- The Sea Fishing (Enforcement of Community Conservation Measures) Order 2000 (S.I. 2000 No. 1081)
- The Social Security (National Insurance Number Information: Exemption) Regulations 2000 (S.I. 2000 No. 1082)
- The Retirement Benefits Schemes (Sharing of Pensions on Divorce or Annulment) Regulations 2000 (S.I. 2000 No. 1085)
- The Retirement Benefits Schemes (Restriction on Discretion to Approve) (Small Self-administered Schemes) (Amendment) Regulations 2000 (S.I. 2000 No. 1086)
- The Retirement Benefits Schemes (Restriction on Discretion to Approve) (Excepted Provisions) Regulations 2000 (S.I. 2000 No. 1087)
- The Retirement Benefits Schemes (Restriction on Discretion to Approve) (Additional Voluntary Contributions) (Amendment) Regulations 2000 (S.I. 2000 No. 1088)
- The Education (School Performance Information) (England) (Amendment) Regulations 2000 (S.I. 2000 No. 1089)
- The Financing of Maintained Schools (England) (No. 2) Regulations 2000 (S.I. 2000 No. 1090)
- The Income-related Benefits (Subsidy to Authorities) Amendment Order 2000 (S.I. 2000 No. 1091)
- The Medicines (Products Other Than Veterinary Drugs) (General Sale List) Amendment Order 2000 (S.I. 2000 No. 1092)
- The Finance Act 1999, Schedule 10, Paragraph 18, (First and Second Appointed Days) Order 2000 (S.I. 2000 No. 1093 (C. 32)])
- The Greater London Authority Act 1999 (Commencement No. 5 and Appointment of Reconstitution Day) Order 2000 (S.I. 2000 No. 1094 (C. 33)])
- The Greater London Authority Act 1999 (Commencement No. 6 and Preliminary Arrangements for the Metropolitan Police Authority) Order 2000 (S.I. 2000 No. 1095 (C. 34)])
- The Sea Fishing (Enforcement of Community Quota and Third Country Fishing Measures) (Wales) Order 2000 (S.I. 2000 No. 1096 (W. 74))
- Gorchymyn Pysgota Môr (Gorfodi Mesurau Cymunedol ynghylch Cwotâu a Physgota gan Drydydd Gwledydd) (Cymru) 2000 (S.I. 2000 Rhif 1096 (Cy. 74))
- The Valuation for Rating (Plant and Machinery) (Wales) Regulations 2000 (S.I. 2000 No. 1097 (W. 75))
- Rheoliadau Prisio ar gyfer Ardrethu (Peiriannau a Pheirianwaith) (Cymru) 2000 (S.I. 2000 Rhif 1097 (Cy. 75))
- The Education (National Curriculum) (Attainment Targets and Programmes of Study in Physical Education) (Wales) Order 2000 (S.I. 2000 No. 1098 (W. 76))
- Gorchymyn Addysg (Cwricwlwm Cenedlaethol) (Targedau Cyrhaeddiad a Rhaglenni Astudio mewn Addysg Gorfforol) (Cymru) 2000 (S.I. 2000 Rhif 1098 (Cy. 76))
- The Education (National Curriculum) (Attainment Targets and Programmes of Study in Science) (Wales) Order 2000 (S.I. 2000 No. 1099 (W. 77))
- Gorchymyn Addysg (Cwricwlwm Cenedlaethol) (Targedau Cyrhaeddiad a Rhaglenni Astudio mewn Gwyddoniaeth) (Cymru) 2000 (S.I. 2000 Rhif 1099 (Cy. 77))
- The Education (National Curriculum) (Attainment Targets and Programmes of Study in Mathematics) (Wales) Order 2000 (S.I. 2000 No. 1100 (W. 78))
- Gorchymyn Addysg (Cwricwlwm Cenedlaethol) (Targedau Cyrhaeddiad a Rhaglenni Astudio mewn Mathemateg) (Cymru) 2000 (S.I. 2000 Rhif 1100 (Cy. 78))

== 1101–1200 ==
- The Education (National Curriculum) (Attainment Targets and Programmes of Study in Welsh) Order 2000 (S.I. 2000 No. 1101 (W. 79))
- Gorchymyn Addysg (Cwricwlwm Cenedlaethol) (Targedau Cyrhaeddiad a Rhaglenni Astudio mewn Cymraeg) 2000 (S.I. 2000 Rhif 1101 (Cy. 79))
- The Scotland Act 1998 (Cross-Border Public Authorities)(Adaptation of Functions etc.) Order 2000 (S.I. 2000 No. 1102)
- The Carriage of Goods by Sea (Parties to Convention) (Amendment) Order 2000 (S.I. 2000 No. 1103)
- The Air Navigation (Cosmic Radiation) Order 2000 (S.I. 2000 No. 1104)
- The Organisation for Joint Armament Cooperation (Immunities and Privileges) Order 2000 (S.I. 2000 No. 1105)
- The United Nations (Sanctions) (Amendment) Order 2000 (S.I. 2000 No. 1106)
- The Child Abduction and Custody (Parties to Conventions) (Amendment) Order 2000 (S.I. 2000 No. 1107)
- The Football Spectators (Corresponding Offences in Belgium) Order 2000 (S.I. 2000 No. 1108)
- The Football Spectators (Corresponding Offences in the Netherlands) Order 2000 (S.I. 2000 No. 1109)
- The Equality (Disability, etc.) (Northern Ireland) Order 2000 (S.I. 2000 No. 1110 (N.I. 2)])
- The Airports Act 1986 (Jersey) Order 2000 (S.I. 2000 No. 1111)
- The Deep Sea Mining (Temporary Provisions) Act 1981 (Isle of Man) Order 2000 (S.I. 2000 No. 1112)
- The Scotland Act 1998 (Cross-Border Public Authorities) (British Wool Marketing Board) Order 2000 (S.I. 2000 No. 1113)
- The Patents (Convention Countries) (Amendment) Order 2000 (S.I. 2000 No. 1114)
- The Designs (Convention Countries) (Amendment) Order 2000 (S.I. 2000 No. 1115)
- The Welfare Reform and Pensions Act 1999 (Commencement No. 5) Order 2000 (S.I. 2000 No. 1116 (C. 35)])
- The GLA Roads Designation Order 2000 (S.I. 2000 No. 1117)
- The Pneumoconiosis etc. (Workers' Compensation) (Payment of Claims) (Amendment) Regulations 2000 (S.I. 2000 No. 1118)
- The European Communities (Lawyer's Practice) Regulations 2000 (S.I. 2000 No. 1119)
- The Education (Student Support) (Amendment) Regulations 2000 (S.I. 2000 No. 1120)
- The Education (Student Support) Regulations 2000 (S.I. 2000 No. 1121)
- The Gas Act 1986 (General Restrictions on Disclosure of Information) (Modification) Order 2000 (S.I. 2000 No. 1122)
- The Divorce etc. (Pensions) Regulations 2000 (S.I. 2000 No. 1123)
- The M1–A1 Link (A63 Trunk Road Elongated Junction) (Connecting Roads) Scheme 2000 (S.I. 2000 No. 1136)
- The M1–A1 Link (Belle Isle to Bramham Crossroads Section And Connecting Roads) Scheme 1994 (Variation) (No. 2) Scheme 2000 (S.I. 2000 No. 1137)
- The A63 Trunk Road (Selby Road Junction) Order 1994 (Variation) Order 2000 (S.I. 2000 No. 1138)
- The National Police Records (Recordable Offences) Regulations 2000 (S.I. 2000 No. 1139)
- The Education (National Curriculum) (Exceptions at Key Stage 4) (England) Regulations 2000 (S.I. 2000 No. 1140)
- The A316 Trunk Road (Richmond) Red Route Traffic Order 1997 Variation Order 2000 (S.I. 2000 No. 1141)
- The National Health Service Trusts (Originating Capital) (Wales) Order 2000 (S.I. 2000 No. 1142 (W.80))
- Gorchymyn Ymddiriedolaethau Gwasanaeth Iechyd Gwladol (Cyfalaf Cychwynnol) (Cymru) 2000 (S.I. 2000 Rhif 1142 (Cy.80))
- The Transport for London (Reserved Services) (Croydon Tramlink and Docklands Light Railway) Exception Order 2000 (S.I. 2000 No. 1143)
- The Railways (Alternative Closure Procedure) (Croydon Tramlink) Order 2000 (S.I. 2000 No. 1144)
- The National Assistance (Sums for Personal Requirements) (Wales) Regulations 2000 (S.I. 2000 No. 1145 (W.81))
- Rheoliadau Cymorth Gwladol (Symiau at Anghenion Personol) (Cymru) 2000 (S.I. 2000 Rhif 1145 (Cy.81))
- The Foundation Subject (Amendment) (England) Order 2000 (S.I. 2000 No. 1146)
- The Welsh Development Agency (Financial Limit) Order 2000 (S.I. 2000 No. 1147 (W.82))
- Gorchymyn Awdurdod Datblygu Cymru (Terfyn Ariannol) 2000 (S.I. 2000 Rhif 1147 (Cy.82))
- The Social Security (Contributions) (Amendment No. 5) Regulations 2000 (S.I. 2000 No. 1149)
- The Social Security (Contributions) (Amendment No. 5) (Northern Ireland) Regulations 2000 (S.I. 2000 No. 1150)
- The Income Tax (Sub-contractors in the Construction Industry) (Amendment) Regulations 2000 (S.I. 2000 No. 1151)
- The Income Tax (Employments) (Amendment) Regulations 2000 (S.I. 2000 No. 1152)
- The Education (National Curriculum) (Attainment Targets and Programmes of Study in Art) (Wales) Order 2000 (S.I. 2000 No. 1153 (W.84))
- Gorchymyn Addysg (Cwricwlwm Cenedlaethol) (Targedau Cyrhaeddiad a Rhaglenni Astudio mewn Celf) (Cymru) 2000 (S.I. 2000 Rhif 1153 (Cy.84))
- The Education (National Curriculum) (Attainment Targets and Programmes of Study in English) (Wales) Order 2000 (S.I. 2000 No. 1154 (W.85))
- Gorchymyn Addysg (Cwricwlwm Cenedlaethol) (Targedau Cyrhaeddiad a Rhaglenni Astudio mewn Saesneg) (Cymru) 2000 (S.I. 2000 Rhif 1154 (Cy.85))
- The Education (National Curriculum) (Attainment Targets and Programmes of Study in Geography) (Wales) Order 2000 (S.I. 2000 No. 1155 (W.86))
- Gorchymyn Addysg (Cwricwlwm Cenedlaethol) (Targedau Cyrhaeddiad a Rhaglenni Astudio mewn Daearyddiaeth) (Cymru) 2000 (S.I. 2000 Rhif 1155 (Cy.86))
- The Education (National Curriculum) (Attainment Targets and Programmes of Study in History) (Wales) Order 2000 (S.I. 2000 No. 1156 (W.87))
- Gorchymyn Addysg (Cwricwlwm Cenedlaethol) (Targedau Cyrhaeddiad a Rhaglenni Astudio mewn Hanes) (Cymru) 2000 (S.I. 2000 Rhif 1156 (Cy.87))
- The Education (National Curriculum) (Attainment Targets and Programmes of Study in Modern Foreign Languages) (Wales) Order 2000 (S.I. 2000 No. 1157 (W.88))
- Gorchymyn Addysg (Cwricwlwm Cenedlaethol) (Targedau Cyrhaeddiad a Rhaglenni Astudio mewn Ieithoedd Tramor Modern) (Cymru) 2000 (S.I. 2000 Rhif 1157 (Cy.88))
- The Education (National Curriculum) (Attainment Targets and Programmes of Study in Music) (Wales) Order 2000 (S.I. 2000 No. 1158 (W.89))
- Gorchymyn Addysg (Cwricwlwm Cenedlaethol) (Targedau Cyrhaeddiad a Rhaglenni Astudio mewn Cerddoriaeth) (Cymru) 2000 (S.I. 2000 Rhif 1158 (Cy.89))
- The Education (National Curriculum) (Attainment Targets and Programmes of Study in Technology) (Wales) Order 2000 (S.I. 2000 No. 1159 (W.90))
- Gorchymyn Addysg (Cwricwlwm Cenedlaethol) (Targedau Cyrhaeddiad a Rhaglenni Astudio mewn Technoleg) (Cymru) 2000 (S.I. 2000 Rhif 1159 (Cy.90))
- The Youth Justice Board for England and Wales Order 2000 (S.I. 2000 No. 1160)
- The Immigration (Leave to Enter and Remain) Order 2000 (S.I. 2000 No. 1161)
- The A10 Trunk Road (Haringey) Red Route Experimental Traffic Order 1999 Experimental Variation Order 2000 (S.I. 2000 No. 1162)
- The Electricity Supply Industry (Rateable Values) (Wales) Order 2000 (S.I. 2000 No. 1163 (W. 91))
- Gorchymyn y Diwydiant Cyflenwi Trydan (Gwerthoedd Ardrethol) (Cymru) 2000 (S.I. 2000 Rhif 1163 (Cy. 91))
- The Local Government Pension Scheme (Greater London Authority etc.) Regulations 2000 (S.I. 2000 No. 1164)
- The Blackburn with Darwen Primary Care Trust (Establishment) Order 2000 (S.I. 2000 No. 1167)
- The Trafford South Primary Care Trust (Establishment) Order 2000 (S.I. 2000 No. 1168)
- The Town and Country Planning (Blight Provisions) (Wales) Order 2000 (S.I. 2000 No. 1169 (W. 94 ))
- Gorchymyn Cynllunio Gwlad a Thref (Darpariaethau Malltod) (Cymru) 2000 (S.I. 2000 Rhif 1169 (Cy. 94 ))
- The St Clears-Pembroke Dock Trunk Road (A477) (Sageston-Redberth Bypass) Order 2000 (S.I. 2000 No. 1172 (W.95))
- Gorchymyn Cefnffordd Sanclêr-Doc Penfro (A477) (Ffordd Osgoi Sageston-Redberth) 2000 (S.I. 2000 Rhif 1172 (Cy.95))
- The Regional Development Agencies Act 1998 (Commencement No. 2) Order 2000 (S.I. 2000 No. 1173 (C. 37)])
- The London Development Agency (Transitional Provisions) Order 2000 (S.I. 2000 No. 1174)
- The Conditional Access (Unauthorised Decoders) Regulations 2000 (S.I. 2000 No. 1175)
- The Education (Induction Arrangements for School Teachers) (Amendment No. 2) (England) Regulations 2000 (S.I. 2000 No. 1177)
- The Railways (Inverness Station) (Exemptions) Order 2000 (S.I. 2000 No. 1178)

== 1201–1300 ==
- The Dairy Products (Hygiene) (Charges) (Amendment) (England) Regulations 2000 (S.I. 2000 No. 1209)
- The Lotteries (Gaming Board Fees) Order 2000 (S.I. 2000 No. 1210)
- The Gaming (Bingo) Act (Fees) (Amendment) Order 2000 (S.I. 2000 No. 1211)
- The Gaming Act (Variation of Fees) Order 2000 (S.I. 2000 No. 1212)
- The Gaming Act (Variation of Monetary Limits) Order 2000 (S.I. 2000 No. 1213)
- The GLA Roads Designation (Amendment) Order 2000 (S.I. 2000 No. 1230)
- The Insurance Companies (Amendment) Regulations 2000 (S.I. 2000 No. 1231)
- The Food (Animal Products from Belgium) (Emergency Control) (Revocation) (England and Wales) Order 2000 (S.I. 2000 No. 1232)
- The Animal Feedingstuffs from Belgium (Control) (Revocation) (England and Wales) Regulations 2000 (S.I. 2000 No. 1233)
- The Undersized Whiting (Revocation) Order 2000 (S.I. 2000 No. 1234)
- The Crab Claws (Prohibition of Landing)(Revocation) Order 2000 (S.I. 2000 No. 1235)
- The London Borough of Lewisham (Electoral Changes) Order 2000 (S.I. 2000 No. 1236)
- The A205 Trunk Road (Southwark) Red Route Traffic Order 1999 Variation Order 2000 (S.I. 2000 No. 1237)
- The A205 Trunk Road (Lewisham) Red Route Traffic Order 1999 Variation Order 2000 (S.I. 2000 No. 1238)
- The Export of Goods (Control) (Amendment No. 2) Order 2000 (S.I. 2000 No. 1239)
- The East Riding Health Authority (Change of Name) Order 2000 (S.I. 2000 No. 1240)
- The County Durham Health Authority (Change of Name) Order 2000 (S.I. 2000 No. 1241)
- The Education (National Curriculum) (Key Stage 1 Assessment Arrangements) (England) (Amendment) Order 2000 (S.I. 2000 No. 1242)
- The GLA Side Roads (London Borough of Barking and Dagenham) Designation Order 2000 (S.I. 2000 No. 1256)
- The GLA Side Roads (London Borough of Barnet) Designation Order 2000 (S.I. 2000 No. 1257)
- The GLA Side Roads (London Borough of Bexley) Designation Order 2000 (S.I. 2000 No. 1258)
- The GLA Side Roads (London Borough of Brent) Designation Order 2000 (S.I. 2000 No. 1259)
- The GLA Side Roads (London Borough of Bromley) Designation Order 2000 (S.I. 2000 No. 1260)
- The GLA Side Roads (London Borough of Camden) Designation Order 2000 (S.I. 2000 No. 1261)
- The GLA Side Roads (City of London) Designation Order 2000 (S.I. 2000 No. 1262)
- The GLA Side Roads (London Borough of Croydon) Designation Order 2000 (S.I. 2000 No. 1263)
- The Local Government (Best Value) (Reviews and Performance Plans) (Wales) Order 2000 (S.I. 2000 No. 1271 (W.97))
- Gorchymyn Llywodraeth Leol (Gwerth Gorau) (Adolygiadau a Chynlluniau Perfformiad) (Cymru) 2000 (S.I. 2000 Rhif 1271 (Cy.97))
- The London Cab Order 2000 (S.I. 2000 No. 1276)
- The Employment Zones (Amendment) Regulations 2000 (S.I. 2000 No. 1279)
- The Home Energy Efficiency Scheme (England) Regulations 2000 (S.I. 2000 No. 1280)
- The General Osteopathic Council (Recognition of Qualifications) Rules Order of Council 2000 (S.I. 2000 No. 1281)
- The Immigration and Asylum Act 1999 (Commencement No. 4) Order 2000 (S.I. 2000 No. 1282 (c. 38)])
- The Dolgellau to South of Birkenhead Trunk Road (A494) (Improvement at Tafarn y Gelyn) Order 2000 (S.I. 2000 No. 1283 (W. 98 ))
- Gorchymyn Cefnffordd Dolgellau-Man i'r de o Birkenhead (A494) (Gwelliant yn Nhafarn y Gelyn) 2000 (S.I. 2000 Rhif. 1283 (W. 98 ))
- The A205 Trunk Road (Lewisham) Red Route Traffic Order 2000 (S.I. 2000 No. 1285)
- The GLA Side Roads (London Borough of Ealing) Designation Order 2000 (S.I. 2000 No. 1286)
- The GLA Side Roads (London Borough of Enfield) Designation Order 2000 (S.I. 2000 No. 1287)
- The GLA Side Roads (London Borough of Greenwich) Designation Order 2000 (S.I. 2000 No. 1288)
- The GLA Side Roads (London Borough of Hackney) Designation Order 2000 (S.I. 2000 No. 1289)
- The GLA Side Roads (London Borough of Hammersmith and Fulham) Designation Order 2000 (S.I. 2000 No. 1290)
- The GLA Side Roads (London Borough of Haringey) Designation Order 2000 (S.I. 2000 No. 1291)
- The GLA Side Roads (London Borough of Havering) Designation Order 2000 (S.I. 2000 No. 1292)
- The GLA Side Roads (London Borough of Hillingdon) Designation Order 2000 (S.I. 2000 No. 1293)
- The Drinking Water (Undertakings) (England and Wales) Regulations 2000 (S.I. 2000 No. 1297)
- The Pet Travel Scheme (Pilot Arrangements) (England) (Amendment) Order 2000 (S.I. 2000 No. 1298)
- The Employment Tribunals Act (Application of Conciliation Provisions) Order 2000 (S.I. 2000 No. 1299)
- The Trade Union Recognition (Method of Collective Bargaining) Order 2000 (S.I. 2000 No. 1300)

== 1301–1400 ==
- The Employment Zones (Amendment) (No. 2) Regulations 2000 (S.I. 2000 No. 1305)
- Recognition and Derecognition Ballots (Qualified Persons) Order 2000 (S.I. 2000 No. 1306)
- The GLA Side Roads (London Borough of Hounslow) Designation Order 2000 (S.I. 2000 No. 1307)
- The GLA Side Roads (Royal Borough of Kensington and Chelsea) Designation Order 2000 (S.I. 2000 No. 1308)
- The GLA Side Roads (Royal Borough of Kingston upon Thames) Designation Order 2000 (S.I. 2000 No. 1309)
- The GLA Side Roads (London Borough of Lewisham) Designation Order 2000 (S.I. 2000 No. 1310)
- The GLA Side Roads (London Borough of Newham) Designation Order 2000 (S.I. 2000 No. 1311)
- The GLA Side Roads (London Borough of Lambeth) Designation Order 2000 (S.I. 2000 No. 1312)
- The GLA Side Roads (London Borough of Merton) Designation Order 2000 (S.I. 2000 No. 1313)
- The Food Protection (Emergency Prohibitions) (Oil and Chemical Pollution of Fish) (No. 2) Order 1993 (Revocation) (England, Wales and Northern Ireland) Order 2000 (S.I. 2000 No. 1314)
- The In Vitro Diagnostic Medical Devices Regulations 2000 (S.I. 2000 No. 1315)
- The Civil Procedure (Amendment No. 3) Rules 2000 (S.I. 2000 No. 1317 (L. 11)])
- The A458 Trunk Road (Shelton Traffic Lights To Churncote Roundabout) (Detrunking) Order 2000 (S.I. 2000 No. 1320)
- The Education (School Day and School Year) (Wales) Regulations 2000 (S.I. 2000 No. 1323 (W.101))
- Rheoliadau Addysg (Y Diwrnod Ysgol a'r Flwyddyn Ysgol) (Cymru) 2000 (S.I. 2000 Rhif 1323 (Cy.101))
- The Tax Credits Schemes (Miscellaneous Amendments No. 2) Regulations 2000 (S.I. 2000 No. 1324)
- The Tax Credits Schemes (Miscellaneous Amendments No. 2) (Northern Ireland) Regulations 2000 (S.I. 2000 No. 1325)
- The Children (Protection at Work) Regulations 2000 (S.I. 2000 No. 1333)
- The Merchant Shipping (Survey and Certification) (Amendment) Regulations 2000 (S.I. 2000 No. 1334)
- The Merchant Shipping (Load Line) (Amendment) Regulations 2000 (S.I. 2000 No. 1335)
- The Employment Tribunals Act (Application of Conciliation Provisions) Order 2000 (Revocation) Order 2000 (S.I. 2000 No. 1336)
- The Employment Tribunals Act 1996 (Application of Conciliation Provisions) Order 2000 (S.I. 2000 No. 1337)
- The Employment Relations Act 1999 (Commencement No. 6 and Transitional Provisions) Order 2000 (S.I. 2000 No. 1338 (C. 39)])
- The Montserrat Constitution (Amendment) Order 2000 (S.I. 2000 No. 1339)
- The Pitcairn (Amendment) Order 2000 (S.I. 2000 No. 1340)
- The Pitcairn Court of Appeal Order 2000 (S.I. 2000 No. 1341)
- The United Nations (International Tribunals) (Former Yugoslavia and Rwanda) (Amendment) Order 2000 (S.I. 2000 No. 1342)
- The Virgin Islands (Constitution) (Amendment)Order 2000 (S.I. 2000 No. 1343)
- The Medical (Professional Performance) Act 1995 (Commencement No. 4) Order 2000 (S.I. 2000 No. 1344 (c. 40)])
- The Civil Aviation (Investigation of Air Accidents and Incidents) (Jersey) Order 2000 (S.I. 2000 No. 1345)
- The Air Navigation (Jersey) Order 2000 (S.I. 2000 No. 1346)
- The Flags (Northern Ireland) Order 2000 (S.I. 2000 No. 1347 (N.I. 3)])
- The Licensed Victuallers' National Homes (Charter Amendment) Order 2000 (S.I. 2000 No. 1348)
- Rail Vehicle Accessibility (The Chiltern Railway Company Limited Class 168/1 Vehicles) Exemption Order 2000 (SI 2000/1349)
- The A43 Trunk Road (M40 To B4031 Improvement—Ardley Interchange) (Trunking) Order 2000 (S.I. 2000 No. 1350)
- The A43 Trunk Road (M40 to B4031 Improvement—Ardley Interchange Slip Roads) Order 2000 (S.I. 2000 No. 1351)
- The A43 Trunk Road (M40 to B4031 Improvement Slip Roads) Order 2000 (S.I. 2000 No. 1352)
- The A43 Trunk Road (M40 to B4031 Improvement—Ardley Interchange) Order 2000 (S.I. 2000 No. 1353)
- The A43 Trunk Road (M40 to B4031 Improvement) Order 2000 (S.I. 2000 No. 1354)
- The A43 Trunk Road (M40 to B4031 Improvement) (Detrunking) Order 2000 (S.I. 2000 No. 1355)
- The Devon County Council (Yeo Bridge Barnstaple) Scheme 1999 Confirmation Instrument 2000 (S.I. 2000 No. 1356)
- The Mid-Sussex National Health Service Trust (Establishment) Amendment Order 2000 (S.I. 2000 No. 1362)
- The Social Security Revaluation of Earnings Factors Order 2000 (S.I. 2000 No. 1365)
- The Social Security (Claims and Payments) Amendment Regulations 2000 (S.I. 2000 No. 1366)
- The Federal Republic of Yugoslavia (Freezing of Funds and Prohibition on Investment) (Amendment) Regulations 2000 (S.I. 2000 No. 1367)
- The Medicines (Aristolochia and Mu Tong etc.) (Temporary Prohibition) Order 2000 (S.I. 2000 No. 1368)
- The Road Vehicles (Registration and Licensing) (Amendment) Regulations (Northern Ireland) 2000 (S.I. 2000 No. 1369)
- The Jobseeker's Allowance (Amendment) (No. 2) Regulations 2000 (S.I. 2000 No. 1370)
- The GLA Side Roads (London Borough of Islington) Designation Order 2000 (S.I. 2000 No. 1371)
- The GLA Side Roads (London Borough of Redbridge) Designation Order 2000 (S.I. 2000 No. 1372)
- The GLA Side Roads (London Borough of Richmond upon Thames) Designation Order 2000 (S.I. 2000 No. 1373)
- The GLA Side Roads (London Borough of Southwark) Designation Order 2000 (S.I. 2000 No. 1374)
- The GLA Side Roads (London Borough of Sutton) Designation Order 2000 (S.I. 2000 No. 1375)
- The GLA Side Roads (London Borough of Tower Hamlets) Designation Order 2000 (S.I. 2000 No. 1376)
- The GLA Side Roads (London Borough of Waltham Forest) Designation Order 2000 (S.I. 2000 No. 1377)
- The GLA Side Roads (London Borough of Wandsworth) Designation Order 2000 (S.I. 2000 No. 1378)
- The GLA Side Roads (City of Westminster) Designation Order 2000 (S.I. 2000 No. 1379)
- The Air Navigation (Cosmic Radiation) (Keeping of Records) Regulations 2000 (S.I. 2000 No. 1380)
- The Immigration (Transit Visa) (Amendment) Order 2000 (S.I. 2000 No. 1381)
- The Welfare Reform and Pensions Act 1999 (Commencement No. 7) Order 2000 (S.I. 2000 No. 1382 (c. 41)])
- The College of Guidance Studies Higher Education Corporation (Dissolution) Order 2000 (S.I. 2000 No. 1383)
- The Hertsmere Primary Care Trust (Establishment) Order 2000 (S.I. 2000 No. 1384)
- The Export of Goods (Control) (Amendment No. 3) Order 2000 (S.I. 2000 No. 1396)
- The African Development Fund (Eighth Replenishment) Order 2000 (S.I. 2000 No. 1397)
- The African Development Bank (Further Subscription to Capital Stock) Order 2000 (S.I. 2000 No. 1398)
- The International Development Association (Twelfth Replenishment) Order 2000 (S.I. 2000 No. 1399)}

== 1401–1500 ==
- The Social Security (Attendance Allowance and Disability Living Allowance) (Amendment) Regulations 2000 (S.I. 2000 No. 1401)
- The Income Support (General) (Standard Interest Rate Amendment) (No. 2) Regulations 2000 (S.I. 2000 No. 1402)
- The Stakeholder Pension Schemes Regulations 2000 (S.I. 2000 No. 1403)
- The Home-Grown Cereals Authority (Rate of Levy) Order 2000 (S.I. 2000 No. 1404)
- The A41 Trunk Road (Barnet) Red Route (No. 2) Traffic Order 1997 Variation Order 2000 (S.I. 2000 No. 1405)
- The Multilateral Investment Guarantee Agency (Further Subscription to Capital Stock) Order 2000 (S.I. 2000 No. 1406)
- Education (Student Support) (European Institutions) (Amendment) (No. 2) Regulations 2000 (S.I. 2000 No. 1407)
- The Burma (Sale, Supply and Export of Goods) (Penalties) Regulations 2000 (S.I. 2000 No. 1408)
- The Northern Ireland Arms Decommissioning Act 1997 (Amnesty Period) (No. 2) Order 2000 (S.I. 2000 No. 1409)
- The Local Government (Early Termination of Employment) (Discretionary Compensation)(England and Wales) Regulations 2000 (S.I. 2000 No. 1410)
- The National Minimum Wage (Increase in Development Rate for Young Workers) Regulations 2000 (S.I. 2000 No. 1411)
- The Barking, Havering and Redbridge Hospitals National Health Service Trust (Establishment) Order 2000 (S.I. 2000 No. 1413)
- The Whipps Cross Hospital National Health Service Trust (Establishment) Order 2000 (S.I. 2000 No. 1414)
- The North East London Mental Health National Health Service Trust (Establishment) Order 2000 (S.I. 2000 No. 1415)
- The BHB Community Health Care, the Forest Healthcare, the Havering Hospitals and the Redbridge Health Care National Health Service Trusts (Dissolution) Order 2000 (S.I. 2000 No. 1416)
- The District of Bridgnorth (Electoral Changes) Order 2000 (S.I. 2000 No. 1417)
- The Borough of Oswestry (Electoral Changes) Order 2000 (S.I. 2000 No. 1418)
- The District of North Shropshire (Electoral Changes) Order 2000 (S.I. 2000 No. 1419)
- The District of South Shropshire (Electoral Changes) Order 2000 (S.I. 2000 No. 1420)
- The National Savings Bank (Investment Deposits) (Limits) (Amendment) Order 2000 (S.I. 2000 No. 1421)
- The National Health Service (Charges for Drugs and Appliances) Amendment (Wales) Regulations 2000 (S.I. 2000 No. 1422 (W.102))
- Rheoliadau'r Gwasanaeth Iechyd Gwladol (Ffioedd am Gyffuriau ac Offer) Diwygio (Cymru) 2000 (S.I. 2000 Rhif 1422 (Cy.102))
- The Education (Mandatory Awards) (Amendment) Regulations 2000 (S.I. 2000 No. 1425)
- The Commission Areas (Thames Valley) Order 2000 (S.I. 2000 No. 1429)
- The Companies Act 1985 (Audit Exemption) (Amendment) Regulations 2000 (S.I. 2000 No. 1430)
- The Public Service Vehicles (Conditions of Fitness, Equipment, Use and Certification) (Amendment) Regulations 2000 (S.I. 2000 No. 1431)
- The Motor Vehicles (Tests) (Amendment) Regulations 2000 (S.I. 2000 No. 1432)
- The Goods Vehicles (Plating and Testing) (Amendment) Regulations 2000 (S.I. 2000 No. 1433)
- The Road Vehicles (Construction and Use) (Amendment) Regulations 2000 (S.I. 2000 No. 1434)
- The Greater London Authority (Miscellaneous Amendments) Order 2000 (S.I. 2000 No. 1435)
- The Rail Vehicle Accessibility (Central Trains Class 170/5 and Class 170/6 Vehicles) Exemption Order 2000 (S.I. 2000 No. 1441)
- The Greater London (Penalty Fares) (Croydon Tramlink Designation) Order 2000 (S.I. 2000 No. 1442)
- The Employment Code of Practice (Access to Workers during Recognition and Derecognition Ballots) Order 2000 (S.I. 2000 No. 1443)
- The Income Support (General) and Jobseeker's Allowance Amendment Regulations 2000 (S.I. 2000 No. 1444)
- The Northern Ireland Act 2000 (Restoration of Devolved Government) Order 2000 (S.I. 2000 No. 1445)
- The Northern Ireland Act 2000 (Modification) Order 2000 (S.I. 2000 No. 1446)
- The General Teaching Council for England (Constitution) (Amendment) Regulations 2000 (S.I. 2000 No. 1447)
- The Scotland Act 1998 (Modification of Functions) Order 2000 (S.I. 2000 No. 1458)
- The Protection of Children Act 1999 (Commencement No. 1) Order 2000 (S.I. 2000 No. 1459 (C.42)])
- The Sulphur Content of Liquid Fuels (England and Wales) Regulations 2000 (S.I. 2000 No. 1460)
- The Regulation of Bus Services in Greater London (Transitional Provisions) Order 2000 (S.I. 2000 No. 1462)
- The Amalgamation of the Lower Alde and Middle Alde Internal Drainage Districts Order 2000 (S.I. 2000 No. 1463)
- The International Transport of Goods under Cover of TIR Carnets (Fees) (Amendment) Regulations 2000 (S.I. 2000 No. 1464)
- The Passenger and Goods Vehicles (Recording Equipment) (Approval of Fitters and Workshops) (Fees) (Amendment) Regulations 2000 (S.I. 2000 No. 1465)
- The Housing Benefit and Council Tax Benefit (General) Amendment (No. 2) Regulations 2000 (S.I. 2000 No. 1471)
- The Burma (Freezing of Funds) Regulations 2000 (S.I. 2000 No. 1472)
- The Census Regulations 2000 (S.I. 2000 No. 1473)
- The Metropolitan Police (Capital Finance) Order 2000 (S.I. 2000 No. 1474)
- The Distress for Rent (Amendment) Rules 2000 (S.I. 2000 No. 1481 (L. 12)])
- The Civil Courts (Amendment) Order 2000 (S.I. 2000 No. 1482)
- The Social Security (Benefits for Widows and Widowers) (Consequential Amendments) Regulations 2000 (S.I. 2000 No. 1483)
- The London Transport Users' Committee (Transitional Provisions) Order 2000 (S.I. 2000 No. 1484)
- The Borough of Southend-on-Sea (Electoral Changes) Order 2000 (S.I. 2000 No. 1487)
- The Motor Cycles (Protective Helmets) (Amendment) Regulations 2000 (S.I. 2000 No. 1488)
- The Motor Cycles (Eye Protectors) (Amendment) Regulations 2000 (S.I. 2000 No. 1489)
- The Education (Student Support) Regulations 2000 (Amendment) Regulations 2000 (S.I. 2000 No. 1490)
- The Town and Country Planning (London Spatial Development Strategy) Regulations 2000 (S.I. 2000 No. 1491)
- The Housing Grants (Additional Purposes) (England) Order 2000 (S.I. 2000 No. 1492)
- The Town and Country Planning (Mayor of London) Order 2000 (S.I. 2000 No. 1493)

== 1601–1700 ==
- The Undersized Spider Crabs Order 2000 (S.I. 2000 No. 1502)
- The Undersized Lobsters Order 2000 (S.I. 2000 No. 1503)
- The London Regional Transport (Transitional Modifications) Order 2000 (S.I. 2000 No. 1504)
- The Development Commission (Dissolution) Order 2000 (S.I. 2000 No. 1505)
- The Transport for London (Transitional Provisions) (Croydon Tramlink) Order 2000 (S.I. 2000 No. 1506)
- The Disabled Persons (Badges for Motor Vehicles) (England) (Amendment) Regulations 2000 (S.I. 2000 No. 1507)
- The Highway Litter Clearance and Cleaning (Transfer Of Responsibility) (A13 Trunk Road) Order 2000 (S.I. 2000 No. 1508)
- The Infant Formula and Follow-on Formula (Amendment) (England) Regulations 2000 (S.I. 2000 No. 1509)
- The Processed Cereal-based Foods and Baby Foods for Infants and Young Children (Amendment) (England) Regulations 2000 (S.I. 2000 No. 1510)
- The Highways (Traffic Calming) (Amendment) Regulations 2000 (S.I. 2000 No. 1511)
- The Value Added Tax (Refund of Tax) (No. 2) Order 2000 (S.I. 2000 No. 1515)
- The Exchange of Securities (General) (Amendment) Rules 2000 (S.I. 2000 No. 1516)
- The Value Added Tax (Protective Helmets) Order 2000 (S.I. 2000 No. 1517)
- The Community Legal Service (Funding) (Amendment) Order 2000 (S.I. 2000 No. 1541)
- The Seeds (Fees) (Amendment) (England) Regulations 2000 (S.I. 2000 No. 1542)
- The Supreme Court Fees (Amendment No. 3) Order 2000 (S.I. 2000 No. 1544 (L.13)])
- The Family Proceedings Fees (Amendment No. 3) Order 2000 (S.I. 2000 No. 1545 (L. 14)])
- The County Court Fees (Amendment No. 3) Order 2000 (S.I. 2000 No. 1546 (L. 15)])
- The Greater London Highways and Road Traffic (Various Provisions) Order 2000 (S.I. 2000 No. 1547)
- The Transport for London (Specified Activities) Order 2000 (S.I. 2000 No. 1548)
- The Greater London Authority Act 1999 (Consequential Amendments) (Police) Order 2000 (S.I. 2000 No. 1549)
- Part-time Workers (Prevention of Less Favourable Treatment) Regulations 2000 (S.I. 2000 No. 1551)
- The GLA Roads and Side Roads (Transfer of Property etc.) Order 2000 (S.I. 2000 No. 1552)
- The Greater London Authority Act 1999 (Consequential Amendments of Subordinate Legislation) (Fire etc. Authority) Order 2000 (S.I. 2000 No. 1553)
- The Building Regulations (Amendment) Regulations 2000 (S.I. 2000 No. 1554)
- The European Convention on Cinematographic Co-production (Amendment) Order 2000 (S.I. 2000 No. 1555)
- The Eritrea and Ethiopia (United Nations Sanctions) Order 2000 (S.I. 2000 No. 1556)
- The Eritrea and Ethiopia (United Nations Sanctions) (Overseas Territories) Order 2000 (S.I. 2000 No. 1557)
- The Eritrea and Ethiopia (United Nations Sanctions) (Isle of Man) Order 2000 (S.I. 2000 No. 1558)
- The Eritrea and Ethiopia (United Nations Sanctions) (Channel Islands) Order 2000 (S.I. 2000 No. 1559)
- The Patents (Convention Countries) (Amendment) (No. 2) Order 2000 (S.I. 2000 No. 1560)
- The Designs (Convention Countries) (Amendment) (No. 2) Order 2000 (S.I. 2000 No. 1561)
- The Air Navigation Order 2000 (S.I. 2000 No. 1562)
- The Scotland Act 1998 (Transfer of Functions to the Scottish Ministers etc.) Order 2000 (S.I. 2000 No. 1563)
- The M62 and M1 Motorways (Lofthouse Link Roads) (Speed Limit) Regulations 2000 (S.I. 2000 No. 1565)
- The A501 Trunk Road (Camden, Islington and Westminster) Red Route Traffic Order 1997 Variation Order 2000 (S.I. 2000 No. 1566)
- The Youth Justice and Criminal Evidence Act 1999 (Commencement No. 3) Order 2000 (S.I. 2000 No. 1587 (c. 43)])
- The Social Security (Industrial Injuries) (Prescribed Diseases) Amendment Regulations 2000 (S.I. 2000 No. 1588)
- The M61 Motorway (Kearsley Spur) (Speed Limit) Regulations 2000 (S.I. 2000 No. 1593)
- The Education (National Curriculum) (Attainment Targets and Programmes of Study in Modern Foreign Languages) (England) Order 2000 (S.I. 2000 No. 1595)
- The Social Security and Child Support (Miscellaneous Amendments) Regulations 2000 (S.I. 2000 No. 1596)
- The Education (National Curriculum) (Attainment Targets and Programmes of Study in Music) (England) Order 2000 (S.I. 2000 No. 1597)
- The Education (National Curriculum) (Attainment Targets and Programmes of Study in Mathematics) (England) Order 2000 (S.I. 2000 No. 1598)
- The Education (National Curriculum) (Attainment Targets and Programmes of Study in Design and Technology) (England) Order 2000 (S.I. 2000 No. 1599)
- The Education (National Curriculum) (Attainment Targets and Programmes of Study in Science) (England) Order 2000 (S.I. 2000 No. 1600)
- The Education (National Curriculum) (Attainment Targets and Programmes of Study in Information and Communication Technology) (England) Order 2000 (S.I. 2000 No. 1601)
- The Education (National Curriculum) (Attainment Targets and Programmes of Study in Art and Design) (England) Order 2000 (S.I. 2000 No. 1602)
- The Education (National Curriculum) (Attainment Target and Programmes of Study in Citizenship) (England) Order 2000 (S.I. 2000 No. 1603)
- The Education (National Curriculum) (Attainment Targets and Programmes of Study in English) (England) Order 2000 (S.I. 2000 No. 1604)
- The Education (National Curriculum) (Attainment Targets and Programmes of Study in Geography) (England) Order 2000 (S.I. 2000 No. 1605)
- The Education (National Curriculum) (Attainment Targets and Programmes of Study in History) (England) Order 2000 (S.I. 2000 No. 1606)
- The Education (National Curriculum) (Attainment Targets and Programmes of Study in Physical Education) (England) Order 2000 (S.I. 2000 No. 1607)
- The Northern Ireland (Emergency and Prevention of Terrorism Provisions) (Continuance) Order 2000 (S.I. 2000 No. 1608)
- The Transport of Animals (Cleansing and Disinfection) (England) (No. 2) Order 2000 (S.I. 2000 No. 1618)
- The Veterinary Surgeons and Veterinary Practitioners (Registration) Regulations Order of Council 2000 (S.I. 2000 No. 1619)
- The Education (School Teacher Appraisal) (England) Regulations 2000 (S.I. 2000 No. 1620)
- The United Kingdom Transplant Support Service Authority (Establishment and Constitution) Amendment Order 2000 (S.I. 2000 No. 1621)
- The Housing (Right to Acquire) (Discount) Order 2000 (S.I. 2000 No. 1622)
- The Merchant Shipping (Formal Investigations) (Amendment) Rules 2000 (S.I. 2000 No. 1623)
- The Town and Country Planning (Inquiries Procedure) (England) Rules 2000 (S.I. 2000 No. 1624)
- The Town and Country Planning Appeals (Determination by Inspectors) (Inquiries Procedure) (England) Rules 2000 (S.I. 2000 No. 1625)
- The Town and Country Planning (Hearings Procedure) (England) Rules 2000 (S.I. 2000 No. 1626)
- The Town and Country Planning (General Development Procedure) (England) (Amendment) Order 2000 (S.I. 2000 No. 1627)
- The Town and Country Planning (Appeals) (Written Representations Procedure) (England) Regulations 2000 (S.I. 2000 No. 1628)
- Charities (Royal Medical Foundation of Epsom College) Order 2000 (SI 2000/1639)
- The Offshore Installations (Safety Zones) Order 2000 (S.I. 2000 No. 1640)
- The Pet Travel Scheme (Pilot Arrangements) (England) (Amendment) (No. 3) Order 2000 (S.I. 2000 No. 1641)
- The A501 Trunk Road (Westminster) Red Route (Clearway) Traffic Order 2000 (S.I. 2000 No. 1642)
- The A3220 Trunk Road (Hammersmith & Fulham) Red Route (Clearway) Traffic Order 2000 (S.I. 2000 No. 1643)
- The A40 Trunk Road (Hammersmith & Fulham, Kensington & Chelsea and Westminster) Red Route (Clearway) Traffic Order 2000 (S.I. 2000 No. 1644)
- The National Health Service (General Medical Services) Amendment (No. 3) Regulations 2000 (S.I. 2000 No. 1645)
- The Explosive Substances (Hazard Information) Regulations (Northern Ireland) 2000 (S.I. 2000 No. 1646)
- The A13 Trunk Road (Tower Hamlets) Red Route Traffic Order 2000 (S.I. 2000 No. 1647)
- The Greater London Authority Act 1999 (Commencement No. 7, Transitional Provisions and Amendment) Order 2000 (S.I. 2000 No. 1648 (c. 44)])
- The London Cab Order 1934 (Modification) Order 2000 (S.I. 2000 No. 1666)
- The Bovines and Bovine Products (Trade) (Amendment) (England) Regulations 2000 (S.I. 2000 No. 1667)
- The Dangerous Substances and Preparations (Nickel) (Safety) Regulations 2000 (S.I. 2000 No. 1668)
- The East London and The City Mental Health National Health Service Trust (Establishment) Amendment Order 2000 (S.I. 2000 No. 1669)
- The A316 Trunk Road (Hanworth Road, Country Way and Great Chertsey Road, Hounslow and Spelthorne) (Speed Limits) Order 2000 (S.I. 2000 No. 1671)
- The Value Added Tax (Refund of Tax) (No. 3) Order 2000 (S.I. 2000 No. 1672)
- The Animals and Animal Products (Import and Export) (England and Wales) Regulations 2000 (S.I. 2000 No. 1673)
- The Railways (Interoperability) (Notified Bodies) Regulations 2000 (S.I. 2000 No. 1674)
- The Borough of North Warwickshire (Electoral Changes) Order 2000 (S.I. 2000 No. 1675)
- The Borough of Rugby (Electoral Changes) Order 2000 (S.I. 2000 No. 1676)
- The District of Warwick (Electoral Changes) Order 2000 (S.I. 2000 No. 1677)
- The Wireless Telegraphy (Licence Charges) (Amendment) Regulations 2000 (S.I. 2000 No. 1678)
- The Cosmetic Products (Safety) (Amendment) Regulations 2000 (S.I. 2000 No. 1679)
- The Local Authority (Stocks and Bonds) (Amendment) Regulations 2000 (S.I. 2000 No. 1680)
- The Government Stock (Amendment) Regulations 2000 (S.I. 2000 No. 1681)
- The Uncertificated Securities (Amendment) Regulations 2000 (S.I. 2000 No. 1682)
- The Merchant Shipping (Fees)(Amendment) Regulations 2000 (S.I. 2000 No. 1683)
- The Rutland Sixth Form College, Oakham (Dissolution) Order 2000 (S.I. 2000 No. 1684)
- The Feedingstuffs (Zootechnical Products) and Medicated Feedingstuffs (Amendment) Regulations 2000 (S.I. 2000 No. 1686)
- The Friendly Societies (Insurance Business) (Amendment) Regulations 2000 (S.I. 2000 No. 1700)

== See also ==
- List of statutory instruments of the United Kingdom
