= Pooja Tripathi =

Indian-American actress and internet personality

Pooja Tripathi is an Indian-American actress. She created the Brooklyn Coffee Shop web series, which won the 2026 Webby Award in Video & Film.

== Biography ==
Tripathi quit her marketing job at Dior in May 2018. She co-produced a web series called Amsterdam Ave. Tripathi began posting videos on social media in March 2021, which she performed sketches relating to New York City. She gained her first sponsorship in July 2021.

She started the Brooklyn Coffee Shop series—a series about a hipster barista in a fictional coffee shop— in June 2023 as a TikTok and Instagram series after discussing alternative milks with her friend and creating a video on that conversation. The series allowed Tripathi to quit her part-time job in December 2024. The series won the 2026 Webby Award in Video & Film.
