= Part-time Work Directive 1997 =

European Union Directive

Part-time Work Directive 97/81/EC is one of three EU Directives that regulate atypical work. Alongside the Fixed-term Work Directive and the Agency Work Directive, it aims to ensure that people who have not contracted for permanent jobs are nevertheless guaranteed a minimum level of equal treatment compared to full-time permanent staff.

== Content ==
Article 1 of the Directive states its purpose: to enforce the framework agreement between the ETUC, the UNICE, and the CEEP. This gives rise to various provisions on fixed-term worker rights in the Directive.

Clause 2(2) says that member states can exclude some categories of casual workers for objective reasons, with the condition that the member state must consult social partners before applying the exclusions.

Clause 3(2) defines the term "comparable full-time worker" as "a full-time worker in the same establishment having the same type of employment contract or relationship, who is engaged in the same or a similar work/occupation, due regard being given to other considerations which may include seniority and qualification/skills. Where there is no comparable full-time worker in the same establishment, the comparison shall be made by reference to the applicable collective agreement or, where there is no applicable collective agreement, in accordance with national law, collective agreements or practice."

Clause 4(1) says that "[i]n respect of employment conditions, part-time workers shall not be treated in a less favourable manner than comparable full-time workers solely because they work part-time unless different treatment is justified on objective grounds." Clause 4(4) adds that through collective agreements, social partners can apply conditions for access based on length of service, time worked, or earnings.

Clause 5(1) says that member states should identify and review obstacles to part-time work. Clause 5(2) states that a worker's refusal to transfer from full to part-time work, or vice versa, should not be a reason for dismissal. Clause 5(3) says that employers should give consideration to job transfer requests in and out of part-time work, provide information to worker representatives about vacancies in and out of part-time work, facilitate access to it, and provide vocational training to part-time workers.

Clause 6(1) makes it explicit that individual member states are allowed to apply the Directive in ways that are more favourable to part-time workers, beyond the minimum terms defined in the Directive.

Recital 16 also clarifies that any undefined terms in the Directive should be defined ‘in accordance with national law and practice’.

== Implementation ==
=== EU case law ===
- R (Seymour-Smith and Perez) v Secretary of State for Employment [1999] 2 CMLR 273 [1999] IRLR 253(C-167/97) and [2000] IRLR 263
- Wippel v Peek & Cloppenburg GmbH & Co KG [2005] IRLR 211 (C-313/02)

=== United Kingdom ===
The Part-time Workers (Prevention of Less Favourable Treatment) Regulations 2000 implemented the Directive in UK law, without any appearance of going beyond the minimum. In the leading case, Matthews v Kent & Medway Towns Fire Authority, the House of Lords found that a group of part-time and full-time firefighters were comparable, even though the job responsibilities of the part-time firefighters did not include the administrative work that was expected of the full-time staff.

- McMenemy v Capita Business Ltd [2007] IRLR 400
- Sharma v Manchester City Council [2008] IRLR 336

== See also ==
- ILO Part-Time Work Convention 1994 (c 175)
- ILO Part-Time Work Recommendation 1994 (no 182)
