= Matthews v Kent and Medway Towns Fire Authority =

Matthews v Kent & Medway Towns Fire Authority
- Court: House of Lords
- Decided: 1 March 2006
- Citations: [2006] UKHL 8, [2006] IRLR 367

Case history
- Prior action: [2005] ICR 84

Court membership
- Judges sitting: Lord Nicholls of Birkenhead, Lord Hope of Craighead, Baroness Hale of Richmond, Lord Carswell and Lord Mance

Keywords
- Discrimination

Matthews v Kent & Medway Towns Fire Authority [2006] UKHL 8 is a UK labour law case concerning discrimination of part-time workers, and justifications.

== Facts ==
Part and full-time fire fighters were being paid differently, and claimed unlawful discrimination under the PTWR 2000. Full-time firefighters responded to emergencies and were engaged in educational, preventive and administrative tasks, while part-time firefighters did not do the administrative work.

The Employment Tribunal held that the full-time firefighters fell under regulation 2(3)(a) and the part-time firefighters under regulation 2(3)(d), nor did they do broadly similar work under regulation 4(a)(ii). The EAT upheld the Tribunal. The Court of Appeal held that they had had the same kind of contract under regulation 2(3), because the categories were meant to be mutually exclusive. However, the appeal was still dismissed because the firefighters did not do the same or broadly similar work under regulation 4(a).

== Judgment ==
The House of Lords held by a majority that the two requirements for comparability are that there is the same type of contract being used (not the same terms) or a broadly similar kind of work being done. The Directive clause 3(2) indicated the broad nature of the inquiry. Four held there was the same contract type, and three held there was the same kind of work. The majority held the firefighters were all in category of regulation 2(3)(a). It did not matter under regulation 2(4)(a)(ii) that the full-time fire fighters did a few extra tasks, because their jobs were still broadly similar. The case was remitted to the tribunal to be finalised.

Lady Hale remarked, ‘in answering [the question of broad similarity] particular weight should be given to the extent to which their work is in fact the same and to the importance of that work to the enterprise as a whole. Otherwise one runs the risk of giving too much weight to differences which are the almost inevitable result of one worker working full-time’

Lord Carswell and Lord Mance dissented.

== See also ==
- UK labour law
- UK employment equality law
