= Ford v Warwickshire County Council =

Ford v Warwickshire CC
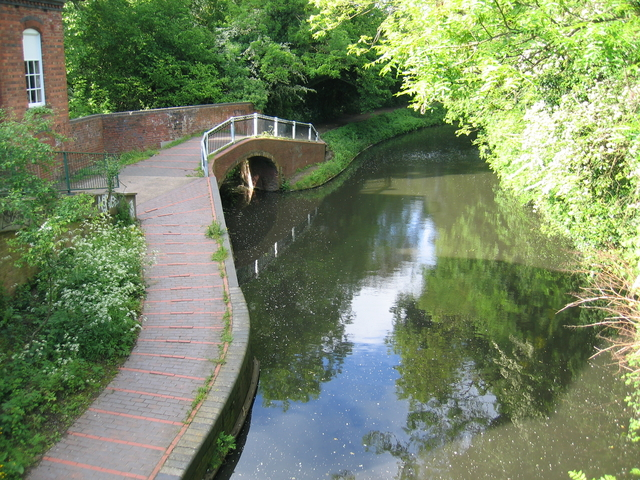
- Canal near the College
- Court: House of Lords
- Citation: [1983] 2 AC 71, [1983] ICR 273

Keywords
- Unfair dismissal

Ford v Warwickshire CC [1983] 2 AC 71 is a UK labour law case, concerning unfair dismissal, governed by the Employment Rights Act 1996.

== Facts ==
Mrs Ford worked from September to July on successive fixed term contracts for 8 academic years as a part-time lecturer at the Warwickshire College of Further Education until September 1979. Then she was told her contracts would not be renewed. Given the summer breaks, the question was whether her summer holiday breaks counted as merely temporary cessations of work. She sought to claim her dismissal was unfair, but was told that her year long fixed term contract was not enough to meet the necessary qualifying period.

== Judgment ==
The House of Lords unanimously held that Mrs Ford was continuously employed, and the summer breaks were merely temporary cessations of an ongoing contract, despite being drafted as fixed terms. Lord Diplock held that there was enough continuity of employment to establish the qualifying period. ‘One looks to see what was the reason for the employer’s failure to renew the contract on the expiry of its fixed term and asks oneself the question: was that reason ‘a temporary cessation of work,’ within the meaning of that phrase’. So for dismissal and redundancy, the period is broken unless ‘there is to be found between one fixed term contract and its immediate predecessor an interval that cannot be characterised as short relatively to the combined duration of the two fixed term contracts. Whether it can be so characterised is a question of fact and degree and so is for decision by an industrial tribunal…’

Lord Keith, Lord Roskill and Lord Brandon concurred.

Lord Brightman said the following.

Suppose that in August 1977 the appellant was engaged under a contract of employment of indefinite duration, starting in September 1977, subject to one week's notice on either side. Suppose that on July 1, 1978, the council gave the appellant one week's notice because her pottery class would not extend beyond July 8, 1978. Suppose that in August 1978 she was engaged under a similar but new contract of employment for an indefinite term starting in September 1978. It could not, I apprehend, be doubted that she would have been absent from work within the meaning of the Act during the 1978 summer vacation on account of a temporary cessation of her work.

Suppose that her contract was determinable by one month's notice on either side, and that such notice was therefore given on June 8, 1978. Again, I apprehend that there is no doubt that the vacation period would "count" on the true construction of the Act.

Both these cases are susceptible to the same analysis as the fixed term contract; that is to say, the appellant's work comes to an end on July 8 because that is the date of expiry of the notice; the notice is served on June 8 or July 1 in anticipation of the fact that her work will cease on July 8, which in the event may or may not prove to be the case. The argument that a fixed term contract ceases on account of the effluxion of time can equally be applied to these two hypothetical cases; the work ceases because the term of the notice has expired. In the cases supposed the immediate cause of cessation of work is, in a sense, the expiry of the notices of dismissal; the effective cause is the anticipated cessation of work.

There is no essential difference in my view where the contract of employment is for a fixed term, the term being fixed by reference to the anticipated availability of work. In the fixed term contract of the kind which features in this case the employer, in effect, gives notice when the contract is signed of the date when the employment is to cease, instead of reserving to himself the right to give such notice at a later date. If paragraph 9 (1) (b) is intended to apply to a case where notice of dismissal is served during the currency of the contract on account of an anticipated cessation of work, I can see no logical reason why it should be supposed not to apply where the contract itself indicates when the employment is to cease, if that is on account of the anticipated cessation of work. In my view paragraph 9 (1) (b) is not concerned with the means employed for bringing the employment to an end temporarily but with the reason for bringing it to an end.

I think that this approach to paragraph 9 (1) (b) is consistent with sections 55 (2) and 83 (2). For the purposes of a claim of unfair dismissal and a claim for a redundancy payment, no distinction is to be drawn between a contract for an indefinite period which is terminated by a dismissal notice and a contract for a fixed period which expires without being extended or otherwise renewed. In each case the employee is to be treated as dismissed by the employer. If it is irrelevant to the employee's right to *90 claim on the ground of unfair dismissal, or to claim a redundancy payment, whether the employee's work has ended owing to the expiry of the fixed term of the contract or owing to the expiry of the term of the notice of dismissal, it seems to me entirely consistent that the "counting" process under paragraph 9 (1) (b) should likewise have no regard to the question whether the "absence from work" was the immediate result of the dismissal notice, or the immediate result of the expiry of a fixed term specified in the contract. The absence must be "on account of a temporary cessation of work," but that requirement can be satisfied equally by a cessation which exists or is anticipated when the employee is dismissed with notice or by a cessation which exists when he is dismissed without notice, or by a cessation which is anticipated when the fixed term is introduced into the contract.

I therefore reach the conclusion that the appellant can properly be described as "absent from work" during each of the vacation periods which spanned her successive contracts of employment and that such absence can properly be described as "on account of a temporary cessation of work" notwithstanding that the contract was brought to an end by the expiry of its fixed term, instead of by the expiry of the term of the dismissal notice; and that an expected cessation of work which governs the length of the fixed term satisfies the words "on account of a temporary cessation of work," just as an expected cessation of work which leads to a dismissal notice would have satisfied those words.

== See also ==
- UK labour law
