= Part-time Workers (Prevention of Less Favourable Treatment) Regulations 2000 =

- Statutory Instrument
- Parliament of the United Kingdom
- Citation: SI 2000/1551

Dates
- Made: 8 June 2000
- Commencement: 1 July 2000
Other legislation
Made under	Employment Relations Act 1999
Transposes	Directive 97/81/EC

Text of statute as originally enacted

Text of the Part-time Workers (Prevention of Less Favourable Treatment) Regulations 2000 as in force today (including any amendments) within the United Kingdom, from legislation.gov.uk.

The Part-time Workers (Prevention of Less Favourable Treatment) Regulations 2000 (SI 2000/1551) is a UK labour law measure which requires that employers give people on part-time contracts comparable treatment to people on full-time contracts who do the same jobs. It implements the Part-time Work Directive 97/81/EC, and forms part of the European Union's programme to combat discrimination of atypical workers. Because the large majority of part-time workers are female, it is also an important attempt to combat sex discrimination.

== Texts of EU and UK legislation ==
- Council Directive 97/81/EC of 15 December 1997 concerning the Framework Agreement on part-time work concluded by UNICE, CEEP and the ETUC - Annex: Framework agreement on part-time work
  - Implemented under Part-time Workers (Prevention of Less Favourable Treatment) Regulations 2000, SI 2000/1551
- Council Directive 1999/70/EC of 28 June 1999 concerning the framework agreement on fixed-term work concluded by ETUC, UNICE and CEEP
  - Implemented under Fixed Term Employees (Prevention of Less Favourable Treatment) Regulations 2002, SI 2002/2034
- Directive 2008/104/EC of the European Parliament and of the Council of 19 November 2008 on temporary agency work
  - Implementation: by 5 December 2011.

== See also ==
- Employment discrimination law in the United Kingdom
- Agency Workers Directive
- UK agency worker law
- McMenemy v Capita Business Ltd [2007]CSIH 25
