= Nethermere (St Neots) Ltd v Gardiner =

United Kingdom employment law court case

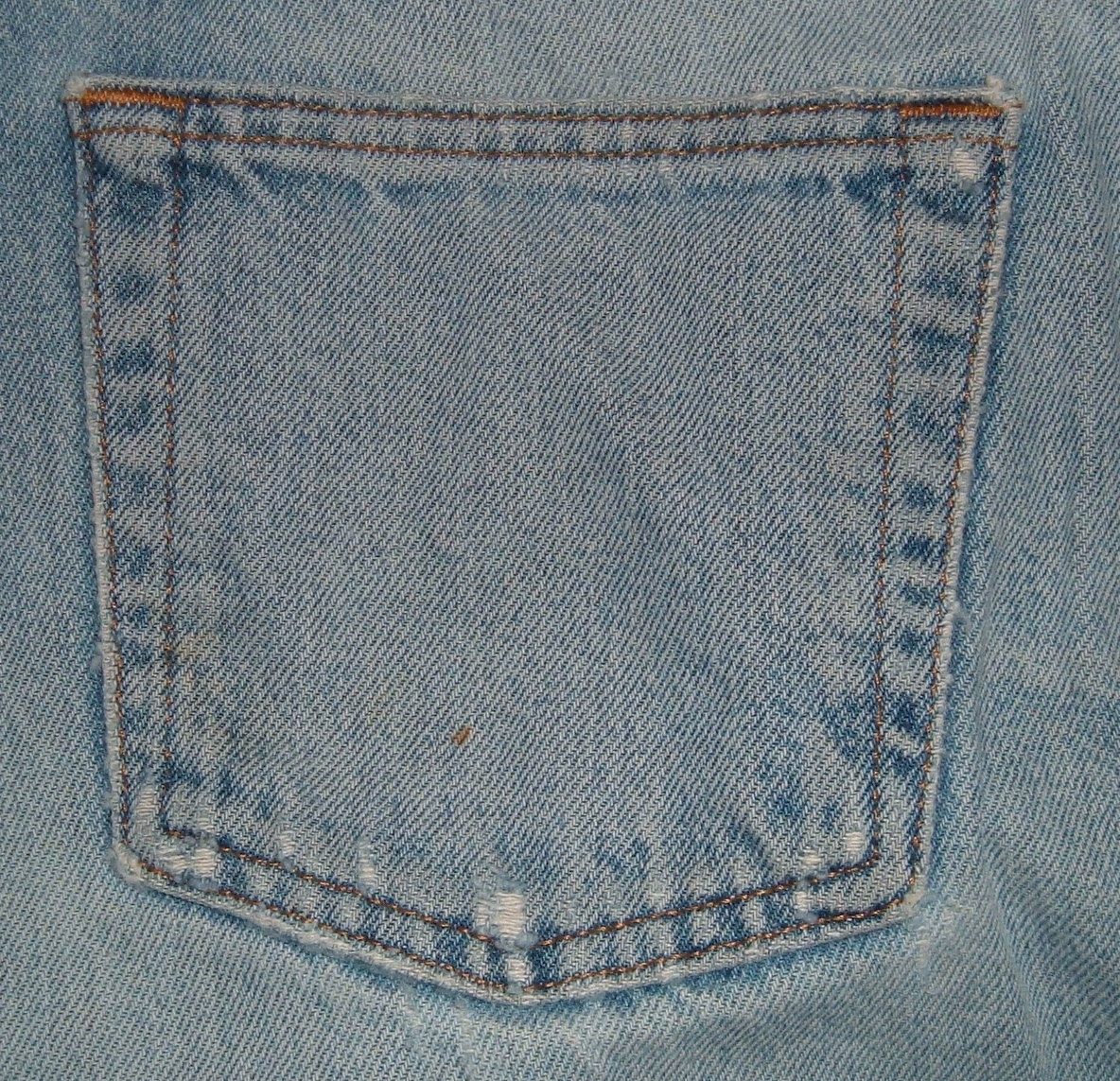
- Court: Court of Appeal
- Citation: [1984] ICR 612

Case history
- Prior action: [1983] ICR 319

Keywords
- Employment rights, holidays, mutuality of obligation

Nethermere (St Neots) Ltd v Gardiner and Another [1984] ICR 612, (Note: The "other" person was Mrs Maria Taverna.) is a UK labour law case heard in the Court of Appeal in the field of home work and vulnerable workers. Many labour and employment rights in Britain, such as unfair dismissal, depend on one's status being an "employee" rather than being "self-employed", or some other "worker". This case stands for the proposition that where "mutuality of obligation" between employers and casual or temporary workers exists to offer work and accept it, the court will find that the applicant has a "contract of employment" and is therefore an employee.

This case is also notable in that it was one of former UK Prime Minister Tony Blair's last cases conducted as a barrister. He acted for the employers. He appeared in the Employment Appeal Tribunal on behalf of the employer but his arguments to deny the workers' unfair dismissal rights were emphatically rejected in the judgment. The employers also lost in the Court of Appeal.

== Facts ==
The applicants (Mrs Taverna and Mrs Gardiner) sewed trouser flaps part-time in the factory of Nethermere Ltd. At different times they became pregnant and made arrangements to work at home. Each worked 5 to 7 hours a day, and for all but 8 or 12 weeks a year. They used sewing machines provided by Nethermere Ltd. Their hours varied according to the employer's needs, they were paid according to the quantity of trouser flaps they made and they were not formally obliged to accept work. There was a dispute about an entitlement to holiday pay, and when the employer refused to give them the entitlement, they claimed they had been unfairly and constructively dismissed. So the preliminary question on appeal was whether the ladies were "employees" under a "contract of employment" and therefore entitled to unfair dismissal rights under s 153 of the Employment Protection (Consolidation) Act 1978 (now s 94 of the Employment Rights Act 1996).

The Industrial Tribunal held that there was a contract of employment, applying the test of whether the ladies could be said to be in business "on their own account". The Employment Appeal Tribunal dismissed the employer's appeal on this point, finding in favour of the ladies. The employer appealed again.

== Judgment ==
=== Employment Appeals Tribunal ===
The judge, Tudor Evans J held that the claimants were entitled to holiday pay. He rejected "mutuality of obligation" as a criterion. However, in the Court of Appeal, "mutuality of obligation" was accepted as a precondition to a contract, but interpreted in a different way. For the later history, Carmichael v National Power plc [1999] AC 1226, Tony Blair's old pupil master, now the Lord Chancellor Derry Irvine, reconfigured "mutuality of obligation" to mean an expressed continuing duty to provide work.

Mr Blair makes four submissions. First, that the question whether the applicants worked under a contract of service or for services is a question of law and not of fact. He relies upon the judgment of Stephenson LJ in Young & Woods Ltd v West [1980] IRLR 201. Secondly, Mr Blair submits that the industrial tribunal found as a fact that the employers were not obliged to supply the applicants with work and that the employees were not obliged to do it. Assuming that the tribunal have so found, Mr. Blair contends that where there is a lack of such mutual obligations, as a matter of law there cannot be a contract of service: mutual obligations are said to be a vital pre-requisite of such a contract. Thirdly, Mr. Blair criticises the conclusion expressed in paragraph 11 of the decision, submitting that the industrial tribunal have failed to relate their conclusion that the employees were not in business on their own account, to the facts: the tribunal have simply stated the conclusion but have not indicated what aspects of the facts led them to the conclusion. Fourthly, Mr. Blair contends that the industrial tribunal misunderstood the ratio of the decision in Airfix Footwear Ltd v Cope [1978] ICR 1210. Analysis of the judgment shows that the case did not decide that work performed consistently over a long period of time with an absence of mutual obligations could constitute a contract of service: a true analysis of the case shows that where the same quantity of work is accepted and performed over a long period, the proper inference is that there may be a mutual obligation to provide and perform it.

On behalf of the applicants, Mr. Jones accepts that the question whether there is a contract of service or a contract for services is a matter of law to be inferred from given facts. He submits that upon this approach, the true and only inference which can be drawn in the present case is that the applicants were employed under a contract of service. He contends that whilst a mutual obligation to provide and perform work is a factor by which to test whether there was a contract of service and that it is difficult to envisage such a contract without some such obligation, it would be wrong to take this as the decisive factor. He submits that the employers' contention that once it is found that there is no mutual obligation there cannot be a contract of service even though there may be factors pointing strongly to the opposite conclusion is contrary to authority and wrong. We shall first consider Mr. Blair's submission that the status of the contract is a matter of law and not of fact. If it be a question of fact our powers on appeal are restricted. The employers would only be able to succeed if it were shown either that there was no evidence to support the findings of fact or if the decision was perverse in that no reasonable tribunal, properly directing itself in law could have reached the decision. The question arose in Young & Woods Ltd v West [1980] IRLR 201. The facts in that case are not material. Stephenson LJ at p. 205, referred to the opinion of Megaw LJ in Ferguson v John Dawson & Partners (Contractors) Ltd [1976] 1 WLR 1213, that the conclusion was one of law and to the opinion of Browne LJ in the same case that it was not. He continued, at p. 205:

"but I must respectfully express my dissent from what Browne LJ said at the very conclusion of his judgment that the conclusion to be drawn from the facts as to the true legal relationship between the parties after the right tests have been applied is a question of fact. If by that he meant that it was a question on which this court cannot interfere, I prefer the view of Megaw L.J. that it is a question of law, in these cases of service or services as in the case of lease or licence, whether the true inference from the facts, the true construction or interpretation of a written agreement or of an agreement partly oral or partly written or of a wholly oral agreement is a matter of law on which there is a right and a wrong view, and if an industrial tribunal comes to what in the view of this court is a wrong view of the true nature of the agreement, it can and should find an error in law on the part of the industrial tribunal and reverse its decision. It cannot say that two views are possible of the true construction of this particular agreement on the facts which the industrial tribunal has found, and we cannot say that no reasonable tribunal could have come to the interpretation which the industrial tribunal has put upon the facts. It must make up its mind what the true interpretation of the facts and the true legal relationship created between the parties is."

Ackner LJ and Sir David Cairns did not express an opinion on the point. But a similar view to that of Stephenson LJ was stated by MacKenna J in Ready Mixed Concrete (South East) Ltd v Minister of Pensions and National Insurance [1968] 2 QB 497, 512, 513.

The contrary conclusion appears to have been expressed in Airfix Footwear Ltd v Cope [1978] ICR 1210, but Ferguson's case and the Ready Mixed Concrete case were not cited to the court. Young & Woods Ltd v West was, of course, decided subsequently.

It seems to us upon the authorities to which we have been referred and in the absence of an argument to the contrary that we should follow the opinion of Stephenson L.J. in West's case that the conclusion is one of law and not of fact. We have to determine what was the true nature of the arrangement between the parties and this seems to us to be a conclusion of law.

It is now convenient to consider whether the industrial tribunal in fact found that the employers had no obligation to provide work or the applicants to perform it, which is the basis of Mr. Blair's second and main contention. Mr. Jones submitted that it is not wholly clear what the tribunal found. He referred to the last sentence in paragraph 8 of the decision: "they could take time off as they liked and we accept that evidence." It is said that, looking at the whole of paragraph 8, the tribunal was accepting only that the applicants could take time off as they liked. It is true that grammatically the finding appears to relate to the freedom to take time off but we think that the clear intention of the tribunal was to accept all the matters of evidence reviewed in paragraph 8. If we are wrong in that conclusion, the difficulty is resolved by the opening words of paragraph 11: "Those are the facts on which we have to determine whether or not these ladies are employees." In saying this the industrial tribunal were referring to all the preceding paragraphs in which they summarised the evidence: if there were a conflict of evidence in relation to the matters referred to in paragraph 8, the tribunal would not have resolved the conflict but as far as we can see the contents of paragraph 8 were not a matter of dispute and therefore, bearing in mind the opening words of paragraph 11, in our judgment the tribunal was accepting as fact the whole of paragraph 8. At the end of the argument, we asked counsel for further submission as to whether, in paragraph 8, the tribunal clearly refer to the lack of mutual obligation or whether the findings were that there was no obligation as to the number of hours the applicants should work or how many garments they should complete with the implication that the applicants were obliged to do some work. Both counsel agreed that there was a reference to a lack of mutual obligations in the sense for which Mr. Blair contends. The words in paragraph 8 are: "He [Mr. Weisfeld] did not consider that he was under any obligation to home workers or they to him." We conclude that there was evidence and a finding of lack of mutual obligation, although our task would have been easier had the tribunal, after reviewing the evidence, clearly set out the findings of fact which they were making. It is convenient also at this stage to consider Mr. Blair's submission that the tribunal failed, when deciding the question which they asked themselves (whether the applicants were in business on their own account), to state what factors led them to that conclusion. We entirely agree with Mr. Blair that it would have been much more helpful if this had been done but it is, we think, reasonably clear what facts were found. Since the conclusion is one of law upon which we have to exercise our own independent judgment on the given facts, we think that the failure of the tribunal to indicate what factors led them to their conclusion is irrelevant.

Although we are taking the point somewhat out of order, we shall now consider the submission that the industrial tribunal misunderstood the ratio in Airfix Footwear Ltd v Cope [1978] ICR 1210. We should say at once that whether or not the tribunal misunderstood or misinterpreted the decision is of no effect in this case. It is clear to us that the decision of the tribunal was not based on the Airfix Footwear case. The decision was based on the answer to the question whether the applicants were in business on their own account.

The industrial tribunal considered that there was a similarity of fact in the Airfix case and the present case in that in both cases the relationship had endured for a substantial time. It is true that the tribunal interpreted the decision in the Airfix case as justifying the conclusion that a contract of service may arise on such facts but, even if they were wrong in that view, we have to exercise our own judgment on the facts as found. It was argued for the employers in the Airfix case that they were not obliged to provide work for the applicant nor was she obliged to perform it and that, in such circumstances, no reasonable tribunal acting judicially could find that there was a contract of service. The appeal tribunal acknowledged that the absence of mutual obligations, where work is offered and performed sporadically, might lead to the conclusion that there was a series of contracts of service or a contract for services but that the answer would depend on the facts of each individual case. The court then reviewed the evidence as found by the tribunal, including the fact that the work had been done for seven years and for five days a week and concluded that, on the material before it, the tribunal was well entitled to come to the conclusion that there was, by reason of the duration of the relationship, a continuing contract of employment. We do not read the judgment as establishing the proposition that before a contract of service can exist there must be the mutual obligations for which Mr. Blair contends.

This leads us to the central submission made on behalf of the employers. In submitting to us that mutual obligations are a crucial pre-requisite of a contract of service, Mr Blair contends that the reason for such a pre-condition is that a contract of service is a continuing relationship between employer and employee. If the performance of work only arises from time to time it is inconsistent with the continuing obligations which are implicit in the master and servant relationship. Mr. Blair accepted that there is some doubt as to the extent of an employer's obligation, whether it is to provide work or to pay wages, but he contends that the employer must do one or the other and his obligation is continuous. On the other hand, employees have the duty to be ready and willing to work and this duty is inimical to the finding in paragraph 8 of the industrial tribunal's reasons that the employers were not obliged to provide nor the applicants to perform work. Mr Blair lays considerable emphasis upon the observations of Kilner Brown J delivering the judgment in Mailway (Southern) Ltd v Willsher [1978] ICR 511, 513–514:

"We have had occasion recently to examine the meaning of 'employment' as contemplated by the Employment Protection Act 1975 in Bullock v Merseyside County Council [1978] ICR 419. Our decision was that employment involved as one factor a necessity for direction and control to be exercised by the employer. As a general rule the employee has to be at the disposition of the employer. In ordinary layman's language the question is: who has the last word in determining whether and how the employee is required to work? Here the workers, in our judgment, were not required to work in accordance with a contract of employment on any particular day. They were invited to work. They were told that work was available if they presented themselves and the last word was with those offering their services. They did not have to come if they did not want to."

We do not accept that the Mailway case is authority for the proposition as framed by Mr. Blair, that once it is found that there is no obligation on either side it is impossible to conclude that there was a contract of service. Young & Woods Ltd v West [1980] IRLR 201 shows to our satisfaction that all the indicia have to be considered, leaving perhaps as fundamental the test whether the applicant was in business on his or her own account. We say that this is perhaps the fundamental test because, although Megaw LJ adopted it in Ferguson's case, he described it as very helpful and Stephenson and Ackner LJJ in West's case found it of assistance. Apart from such a test, there are no conclusive indicia and certainly no pre-conditions. As we understand the position, at one time it was considered that the question of control (whether the employer could dictate where, when and how the work should be done) was thought to be conclusive but such a test is now considered to be only one among many factors.

What then is the approach which we should adopt in this case when deciding what inference should be drawn from the facts as found? We consider that we should adopt the test whether the applicants were in business on their own account and that, in doing so, we should consider what pointers there may be which indicate one direction rather than the other. That was the approach of Stephenson LJ in West's case [1980] IRLR 201, 208.

It is at this stage that there is a divergence of view between the members of this appeal tribunal. The majority opinion (the lay members) is that this was a contract of service and that the appeal must be dismissed. They are impressed by these factors (not expressed in any descending order of importance) when asking themselves the question whether the applicants were in business on their own account:

(i) that the employers provided the applicants with a machine with which to do the work.
(ii) The method of payment. The applicants were paid at the same rate as those who worked in the factory. They kept time sheets sent by the employers and these determined their remuneration. One of the lay members considers that, although not specifically found as a fact, the evidence points to the factory employees being paid on piece work as were the applicants in this case. Both lay members would wish to emphasise that the applicants had no freedom to negotiate the rate of remuneration and there was evidence before the tribunal from Mrs. Taverna that a drop in rate was imposed unilaterally by Mr. Weisfeld.
(iii) Although the applicants were free to choose their hours of work, once they had accepted the work from the van driver they had to perform it. If they had not done the work they would have been "sacked."
(iv) The applicants were unable to change the nature of the work. Mr. Weisfeld decided what work they should do, whether putting on pockets or sewing on flaps. It is considered that if the applicants were self-employed, the nature of the work would have been negotiable, as would also the price for it.
(v) One applicant, Mrs. Gardiner, said in evidence that she was asked to go down to the factory to be shown what to do. She was told that if the machine went wrong to ring the factory and a mechanic would come out.
(vi) Looking at the economic realities of the relationship the applicants were not free to refuse work.
(vii) This was a settled relationship which lasted for a considerable time. The lay members wish to emphasise that the arrangement required that although the applicants could decide how much work to do, nevertheless it was agreed that they had to do sufficient to make it worthwhile for the van driver to call.
(viii) That the work performed by the applicants was similar to that done in the factory.
(ix) That the applicants were not running any economic risk, and that they had no opportunity to profit from sound management. (x) The economic reality of the applicants' situation was consistent with a contract of service.

Thus, the lay members, having looked at all these facts and addressed their minds, as did the industrial tribunal, to the Court of Appeal judgment in Young & Woods Ltd v West have answered "No" to the question: "Were the applicants in business on their own account?" The lay members have also posed themselves the question which Bristow J. called the ultimate one in Withers v. Flackwell Heath Football Supporters Club [1981] IRLR 307, 308: "Is he on his own business rather than the business of the party for whom the work is being done?" To this the lay members reply: "The applicants were upon the business of the party for whom the work was being done." Therefore they find it impossible to reverse the industrial tribunal's decision and they reject the appeal.

In the minority opinion this was not a contract of service. A prime fact is that neither the employers nor the applicants were respectively under and obligation to provide or to perform work. Each was free and in particular the applicants could at all times elect whether or not to work. Thus, Mrs. Taverna exercised her right by taking lengthy periods when she did no work at all as did Mrs. Gardiner to a lesser extent. This is a clear indication that the applicants were not bound to serve and equally that the employers were unable to order the applicants to do the work. The importance of this state of fact was recognised in Mailway (Southern) Ltd v Willsher [1978] ICR 511 and in Airfix Footwear Ltd v Cope [1978] ICR 1210. The applicants were not obliged to present themselves at fixed hours at the factory, ready to do such work as the employers might order them to do. There was no undertaking to do a specific number of hours' work. There was, briefly stated, no obligation upon the applicants to provide themselves to serve. They were free to do the work as and when they liked, they could take time off and they were not obliged to complete the work in any specified period. The industrial tribunal (see paragraphs 6 and 11 of the decision) found that if Mrs. Gardiner wanted less work she would say so. Moreover (see paragraphs 10 and 11 of the tribunal's findings) Mr. Weisfeld told the applicants that he was not deducting tax or national insurance. On the finding, this was a part of the arrangement. It is quite true that the applicants took no financial risk and that they had no responsibility for investment and management, but they were engaged in semi-skilled and simple work and such considerations seem to be inappropriate in the circumstances. The absence of such factors ought not to be decisive. A contrary view might lead to the conclusion that all semi-skilled workers working at home in their own time and when they chose are employed under a contract of service.

The following comments are made concerning some of the factors which have influenced the majority opinion:

(i) There is no finding (and no evidence) that the factory workers were employed on piece work. The evidence and finding was that Mrs. Taverna was paid according to the number of garments she completed, that she kept time sheets and was paid weekly at the same rate as in the factory. What precisely was the method of payment in the factory was not disclosed by the evidence.
(ii) Although Mrs. Taverna said at one stage in her evidence that the rate was dropped when she was working on pockets, the tribunal made no finding on this part of the evidence. Mr. Weisfeld was not asked about it. Mrs. Taverna is not recorded as saying that it had been imposed upon her. Later she appears to contradict her earlier evidence: she is recorded as saying "rate always the same."
(iii) The finding is not that once the applicants had accepted the work they had to perform it. The finding was that they were free to decide whether to work and, if they chose to do so, they were free to decide for how many hours they would work, provided that it was made worthwhile for the van driver to call. This is merely an agreement that the applicants would make it commercially worthwhile for the employers to send the van to their houses. It does not indicate that the applicants were bound to do the work. If it be the fact that once they had accepted the work, the applicants had to perform it, that is equally compatible with a contract for services in the sense that a failure to perform the work would constitute a breach of contract. To suggest that such a failure would cause the applicants to be "sacked" (that is to be dismissed from the employers' service) is to beg the question. It might equally be said that the arrangement would be terminated and that the employers would dispense with the applicants' services. In fact, the applicants did not work sometimes for lengthy periods but the relationship was not terminated.
(iv) It is true that Mrs. Gardiner stated in evidence that she was asked to go down to the factory to be shown what to do and that if the machine which was provided for her went wrong, she should telephone the factory and the mechanic would come out. But Mr. Weisfeld was not asked about this evidence and there is no finding of fact in relation to it.
(v) It is difficult to comment on Withers v Flackwell Heath Football Supporters Club [1981] IRLR 307, since it was not cited in argument and we have not had the advantage of submissions from either counsel with respect to it.
(vi) There is no evidence that the applicants had to perform the work, although economic circumstances may have made it desirable for them to do it.

In the result, although there are factors which can validly be taken into account (for example, the provision of equipment), the inference which should be drawn is that this was not a contract of service. The applicants were in business on their own account. However, for the reasons given this appeal must fail.

=== Court of Appeal ===
In the Court of Appeal, Stephenson LJ in the majority found, first, that whether a contract created a contract of service (and therefore a contract of employment) rather than a contract for services was one of fact, not of law. This has been followed in Carmichael in 1999 by the House of Lords. Stephenson LJ discussed what "mutuality of obligation" meant.

Was there then any misdirection in law on the part of the industrial tribunal? I do not see how it could be submitted that the tribunal erred in directing itself by the “business on her own account” test in the light of the approval given to the similar direction in O'Kelly v Trusthouse Forte Plc. The appeal tribunal thought that the industrial tribunal had mistaken the ratio decidendi of Airfix Footwear Ltd v Cope [1978] ICR 1210, but in my judgment it was the appeal tribunal who misunderstood it and erred in correcting the industrial tribunal on the point. Tudor Evans J said [1983] ICR 319, 326:

“It was argued for the employers in the Airfix case that they were not obliged to provide work for the applicant nor was she obliged to perform it and that, in such circumstances, no reasonable tribunal acting judicially could find that there was a contract of service. The appeal tribunal acknowledged that the absence of mutual obligations, where work is offered and performed sporadically, might lead to the conclusion that there was a series of contracts of service or a contract for services but that the answer would depend on the facts of each individual case. The court then reviewed the evidence as found by the tribunal, including the fact that the work had been done for seven years and for five days a week and concluded that, on the material before it, the tribunal was well entitled to come to the conclusion that there was, by reason of the duration of the relationship, a continuing contract of employment. We do not read the judgment as establishing the proposition that before a contract of service can exist there must be the mutual obligations for which Mr. Blair contends.”

Mr. Blair had contended for the company that there must indeed be mutual obligations before a contract of service can exist; that is, a continuing obligation on the employer to provide work and pay and a continuing obligation on the employee to do the work provided. But he also submitted, at p. 323F, that a true analysis of Airfix Footwear Ltd v Cope [1978] ICR 1210 showed that “where the same quantity of work is accepted and performed over a long period, the proper inference is that there may be a mutual obligation to provide and perform it”; that crucial prerequisite was not, however present in this case.

Does the law require any and what mutual obligations before there can be a contract of service? If the law as to contracts of service is that there must be mutual obligations which were not found by the industrial tribunal or cannot be inferred from the evidence, then the industrial tribunal misdirected itself in law and its determination can and should be set aside. That was Mr. Tabachnik's main contention for the company before this court. I at first thought that Mr. Tabachnik's task had been made easier by a concession, but that concession has been withdrawn, and I have come to the conclusion that his interesting and forceful argument must fail and that no misdirection on the point can fairly be attributed to the industrial tribunal.

For the obligation required of an employer we were referred to old cases where the courts had held that justices had jurisdiction to convict and punish workmen for breaches of contracts to serve masters under the statute 4 Geo. 4, c. 34. For that purpose the court had to decide that there was mutuality of obligation, an obligation on the master to provide work as well as wages, complementing an obligation on the servant to perform the work: R v Welch (1853) 2 E&B 357; Bailey Case (1854) 3 E. & B. 607 and Whittle v Frankland (1862) 2 B&S 49. But later cases have shown that the normal rule is that a contract of employment does not oblige the master to provide the servant with work in addition to wages: Collier v Sunday Referee Publishing Co Ltd [1940] 2 KB 647, 650, per Asquith J. An obligation to provide work was not implied by this court in a salesman's contract: Turner v Sawdon & Co [1901] 2 KB 653; it was in a pieceworker's contract: Devonald v Rosser & Sons [1906] 2 KB 728.

The obligation required of an employee was concisely stated by Stable J. in a sentence in Chadwick v Pioneer Private Telephone Co Ltd [1941] 1 All ER 522, 523D: "A contract of service implies an obligation to serve, and it comprises some degree of control by the master." That was expanded by Mackenna J in Ready Mixed Concrete (South East) Ltd v Minister of Pensions and National Insurance [1968] 2 QB 497, 515:

"A contract of service exists if these three conditions are fulfilled. (i) The servant agrees that, in consideration of a wage or other remuneration, he will provide his own work and skill in the performance of some service for his master. (ii) He agrees, expressly or impliedly, that in the performance of that service he will be subject to the other's control in a sufficient degree to make that other master. (iii) The other provisions of the contract are consistent with its being a contract of service."

Of (iii) MacKenna J. proceeded to give some valuable examples, none on all fours with this case. I do not quote what he says of (i) and (ii) except as to mutual obligations:

“There must be a wage or other remuneration. Otherwise there will be no consideration, and without consideration no contract of any kind. The servant must be obliged to provide his own work and skill.”

There must, in my judgment, be an irreducible minimum of obligation on each side to create a contract of service. I doubt if it can be reduced any lower than in the sentences I have just quoted and I have doubted whether even that minimum can be discerned to be present in the facts as found by the industrial tribunal, particularly in paragraph 8 of its decision, and what the appeal tribunal said about it and counsel's interpretation of it. Tudor Evans J. said [1983] I.C.R. 319, 325:

"At the end of the argument, we asked counsel for further submission as to whether, in paragraph 8, the tribunal clearly refer to the lack of mutual obligation or whether the findings were that there was no obligation as to the number of hours the applicants should work or how many garments they should complete with the implication that the applicants were obliged to do some work. Both counsel agreed that there was a reference to a lack of mutual obligations in the sense for which Mr. Blair contends."

Mr. Blair's contention had been, as I have indicated, that on the evidence the company were not obliged to supply the applicants with work and that the applicants were not obliged to do it. If the decision of the industrial tribunal is to be understood in the sense apparently given it by the appeal tribunal, there was a misdirection in law, for there could have been no contract of service, and perhaps no contract at all. The position of the applicants would have been that of the casual "regulars" as found by the industrial tribunal in O'Kelly v Trusthouse Forte Plc [1983] I.C.R. 728, 743, namely that they had the right to decide whether or not to accept work, and the company had no obligation to provide any work.

Paragraph 8 of the industrial tribunal's decision in the instant case can be read as accepting that position, or a relationship between the company and the applicants which was even more nebulous, if the industrial tribunal was accepting Mr. Weisfeld's opinion of their obligations. They were non-existent; there was no mutuality. And if there was no contractual obligation, either on the company to offer work or on the applicants to do work, there was no contract of service, as I think all the judges in O'Kelly v Trusthouse Forte Plc. held: Sir John Donaldson M.R. at pp. 762–763, Fox L.J. at p. 759 and Ackner L.J. at pp. 753–754. But having looked at the industrial tribunal's decision I conclude that it did not involve a complete rejection of mutual obligations but must be taken to have followed Airfix Footwear Ltd v Cope [1978] I.C.R. 1210 in finding that there was an "overall" or "umbrella" contract obliging the company to continue to provide and pay for work and the applicants to continue to accept and perform the work provided. Considering paragraph 11 of the industrial tribunal's decision and its reference to Airfix Footwear Ltd v Cope, I do not feel driven to hold that the industrial tribunal was making the error made by the appeal tribunal of deciding that no such mutual obligations were necessary and the Market Investigations Ltd v Minister of Social Security test provided a contract of service when there were no such obligations. I know that counsel agreed with the appeal tribunal that that was the correct interpretation of paragraph 8 and the appeal tribunal went on to hold on the basis of that concession that the paragraph so interpreted involved no error in law. But Mr. Jones for the applicants has rightly withdrawn that concession before us, in part at least, and has submitted (1) that an obligation to accept work is a prerequisite of a contract of service but an obligation to provide it is not; (2) that the industrial tribunal was entitled to find that there was an obligation on the applicants' part to accept a reasonable amount of work and an obligation on the company's part to provide a reasonable amount of work, and the company had not shown that the industrial tribunal had held that the company had no such obligation. It accepted Mr. Weisfeld's statement of his opinion, but did not adopt it as a correct interpretation of the parties' relationship.

[...]

There must, I accept, be evidence to support that contract, otherwise there would be an error of law or a decision which no reasonable tribunal could have reached. I think that means evidence at least of an obligation to accept work offered by the company, and on the authority of [Devonald v. Rosser & Sons [1906] 2 K.B. 728, the obligation to accept piecework would imply an obligation to offer it. I agree that the evidence of these obligations is tenuous, so tenuous that the industrial tribunal's decision comes dangerously near the ill-defined boundary which separates the grey area of possible reasonable decisions from the jurisdiction of an appeal court to declare the decision wrong and to put it right. According to the chairman's note Mrs. Taverna said: “I worked whenever needed” and that was understood in paragraph 3 of the industrial tribunal's decision as meaning whenever needed by the company. She refused work when she could not cope with any more, but she let the company know in advance when she was taking a holiday; and Mr. Amos, the company's van driver, agreed that she very rarely refused work and gave good warnings when she did not want it. Both Mrs. Taverna and Mrs. Gardiner submitted weekly “time sheets” regularly to be paid the same rate as the workers in the factory. Mr. Weisfeld described how dependent the company were on their 11 home workers; the 70 employees in the factory could only do about 1,000 trousers per week which left about 5,000 to go out to home workers. The work they did was “an essential part of the production,” and it was the “van driver's duty to be as fair as he could” — presumably in distributing the 5,000 trousers among the 11 home workers. There emerges from the evidence a picture of the applicants' doing the same work for the same rate as the employees in the factory but in their own homes — and in their own time — for the convenience of the workers and the company. If that is a reasonably possible picture, the industrial tribunal's decision can only be upset if Airfix Footwear Ltd. v. Cope [1978] I.C.R. 1210 was wrongly decided, and I do not think it was. I cannot see why well founded expectations of continuing homework should not be hardened or refined into enforceable contracts by regular giving and taking of work over periods of a year or more, and why outworkers should not thereby become employees under contracts of service like those doing similar work at the same rate in the factory.

If then the industrial tribunal reached their unanimous decision, approved by a majority of the appeal tribunal, without any ascertainable misdirection in law, is Mr. Tabachnik's second submission right that the decision is one which no reasonable tribunal could have reached, if properly directed on the evidence before it?

I have already answered that question. On the evidence there was just enough material to make a contract of service a reasonably possible inference in favour of the applicants. In refusing to interfere with that view of these two contracts I follow Slynn J. In Airfix Footwear Ltd. v. Cope [1978] I.C.R. 1210 in refusing to say anything about the general position of outworkers; and I do not attempt to determine what particulars of the contracts the company would have to give to comply with section 1 of the Act of 1978, or whether if they were reduced to writing their nature would be a question of construction to be decided by the appeal tribunal or this court as a question of “pure” law. But for the reasons I have given, which are not those of the appeal tribunal but are those required by the majority judgments in O'Kelly v. Trusthouse Forte Plc [1983] ICR 728, I would dismiss the appeal.

It followed that the ladies were under a contract of employment (however compare the definition of "mutuality" given in Carmichael v National Power plc, by Lord Irvine of Lairg).

== Significance ==
The Employment Appeals Tribunal ([1983] ICR 319) before appeal to the Court of Appeal is of interest, because a future UK Prime Minister was representing the employer. A key plank of the New Labour election pledge in 1997 was to sustain labour market flexibility, which fits in with the approach of his submissions here. In essence, he was arguing that because the interpretation of a contract is one of law, and because it can only be a contract "of employment" if there is a continuing mutual obligation on each party to offer wages or work, the home workers were not employees and therefore were not under the protection of unfair dismissal rights.

== See also ==
- UK labour law
- UK agency worker law
- Ready Mixed Concrete (South East) Ltd v Minister of Pensions and National Insurance
- O'Kelly v Trusthouse Forte plc
- Carmichael v National Power plc
- Aslam v Uber BV (2016) Case no: 2202550/2015
