= O'Kelly v Trusthouse Forte plc =

United Kingdom court case about employment law

- Court: Court of Appeal
- Citation: [1983] ICR 728

Keywords
- Employment contract, mutuality of obligation, casual worker, union discrimination

O'Kelly v Trusthouse Forte plc [1983] ICR 728 was a UK labour law case, in which a bare majority held that a requirement for a contract is "mutuality of obligation" between the parties, which was thought to mean an ongoing duty to offer and accept work. It has been consistently doubted, and its outcome reversed by legislation, and its reasoning superseded by Autoclenz Ltd v Belcher, which states that the only "mutual" obligations that are required are the consideration of work and a quid pro quo.

== Facts ==
Some waiters were hired to cover dinner functions at the Grosvenor House Hotel in London. They were called up for banqueting occasions, and in their contracts it was written that they had no obligation to come, and by the same token the employer had no obligation to call them. They tried to organise a trade union, and were dismissed. They argued that they were dismissed unfairly, because trade union legislation (now in the Trade Union (Labour Relations) Consolidation Act 1992 s 162) gave them a right to not be discriminated against as "employees". However the employer argued that the unfair dismissal legislation (now, Employment Rights Act 1996 s 94) only covered "employees" - something different (now defined in ERA 1996 s 230) - which did not cover their situation. Representing the employer was Alexander Irvine QC, later the Lord Chancellor.

== Judgment ==
Sir John Donaldson MR held the waiters were not "employees" (either of the function hall or the agency) because they did not, technically, have to turn up to work for a shift, and they could be sacked at any time. Sir John Donaldson MR said therefore, that the contract lacked "mutuality" and could not be described as one between an "employee" and "employer". Because they were not "employees" they did not have a right to claim unfair dismissal. And so even though the trade union discrimination legislation protected them, they did not have access to the tribunal to make those rights effective.

The legal effect was to put them in the same legal position as the "self employed" and that they were not covered by the Act. The practical effect was they had no right to fair dismissal and could be sacked for organising a trade union.

== See also ==
- UK agency worker law
- Ready Mixed Concrete (South East) Ltd v Minister of Pensions and National Insurance
- Nethermere (St Neots) Ltd v Gardiner
- Carmichael v National Power plc
