= Re Gray's Inn Construction Co Ltd =

Re Gray’s Inn Construction Co Ltd
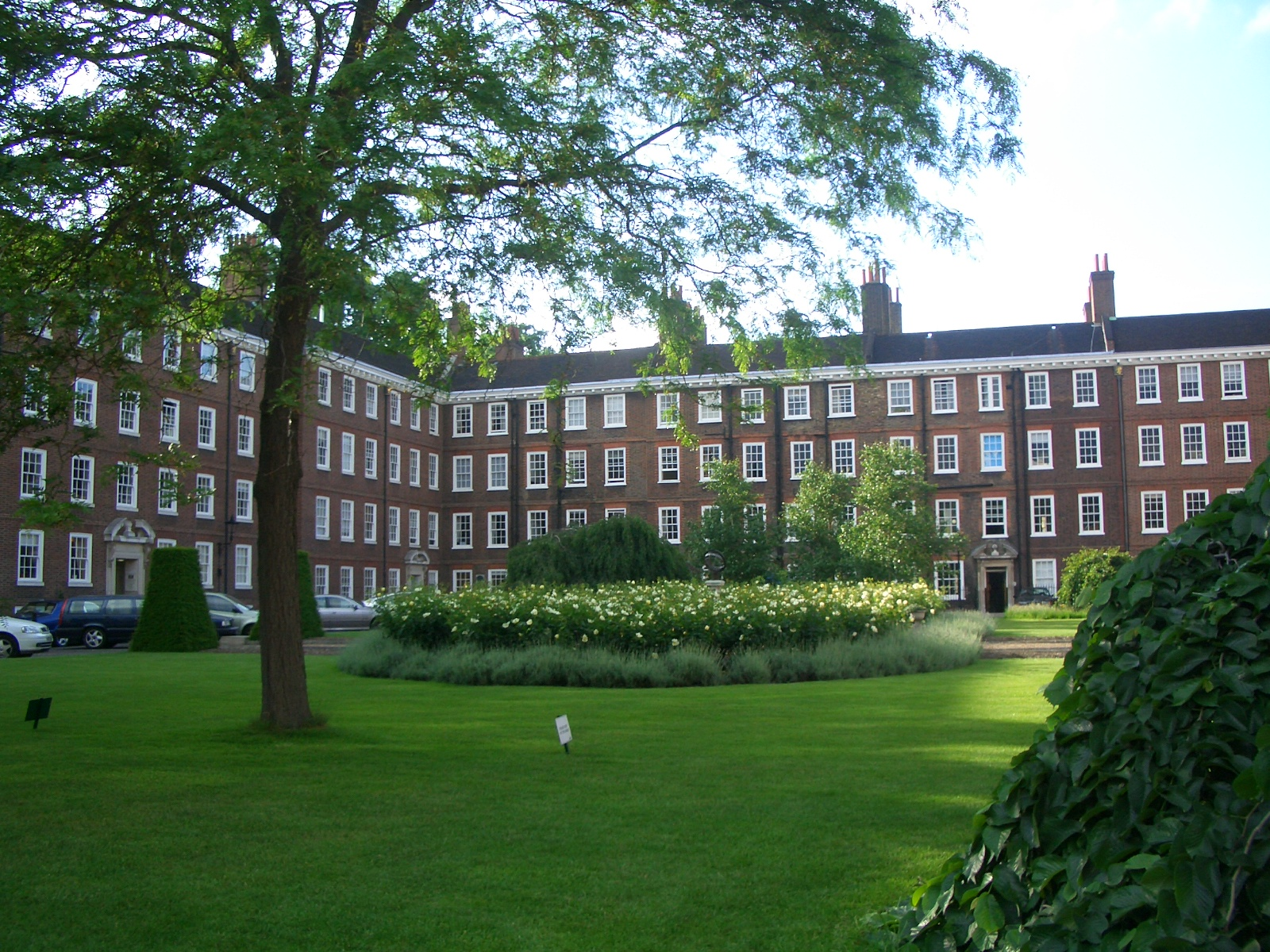
- Court: Court of Appeal
- Citation: [1980] 1 WLR 711

Court membership
- Judges sitting: Buckley LJ, Goff LJ and Sir David Cairns

Keywords
- Voidable preference, undervalue transaction

Re Gray's Inn Construction Co Ltd [1980] 1 WLR 711 is a leading UK insolvency law case, concerning the cessation of transactions without court approval after a winding up petition.

== Facts ==
Gray's Inn Construction Co Ltd was a building business, which did a number of small jobs. When one of its creditors, Field-Davis Ltd presented a petition, it was ordered to be wound up by the court. Between the petition date and the court order date, its bank, NatWest (Tavistock Square branch) allowed it to operate its account. It traded unprofitably.

== Judgment ==
Buckley LJ declined to validate most of the transactions and gave guidance on when they would or would not be void. He held that all transactions in and out of the bank account were ‘dispositions’ within the Insolvency Act 1986 section 127 (at the time, CA 1948 s 227). The court should validate transactions to ensure that unsecured creditors will not be prejudiced, applications for specific transactions have to show proof there will be no prejudice, and the more speculative a transaction is, the more unlikely it should be approved. Applications to court need not be made if there is a need for speedy action and the beneficial character of the bargain is obvious. Sales of assets for full market value raise no concern.

Buckley LJ's judgment read as follows.

It is a basic concept of our law governing the liquidation of insolvent estates, whether in bankruptcy or under the Companies Acts, that the free assets of the insolvent at the commencement of the liquidation shall be distributed rateably amongst the insolvent's unsecured creditors as at that date. In bankruptcy this is achieved by the relation of the trustee's title to the bankrupt's assets back to the commencement of the bankruptcy. In a company's compulsory winding up it is achieved by section 227. There may be occasions, however, when it would be beneficial, not only for the company but also for its unsecured creditors, that the company should be enabled to dispose of some of its property during the period after the petition has been presented but before a winding up order has been made. An obvious example is if the company has an opportunity by acting speedily to dispose of some piece of property at an exceptionally good price. Many applications for validation under the section relate to specific transactions of this kind or analogous kinds. It may sometimes be beneficial to the company and its creditors that the company should be enabled to complete a particular contract or project, or to continue to carry on its business generally in its ordinary course with a view to a sale of the business as a going concern. In any such case the court has power under section 227 of the Companies Act 1948 to validate the particular transaction, or the completion of the particular contract or project, or the continuance of the company's business in its ordinary course, as the case may be. In considering whether to make a validating order the court must always, in my opinion, do its best to ensure that the interests of the unsecured creditors will not be prejudiced. Where the application relates to a specific transaction this may be susceptible of positive proof. In a case of completion of a contract or project the proof may perhaps be less positive but nevertheless be cogent enough to satisfy the court that in the interests of the creditors the company should be enabled to proceed, or at any rate that proceeding in the manner proposed would not prejudice them in any respect. The desirability of the company being enabled to carry on its business generally is likely to be more speculative and will be likely to depend on whether a sale of the business as a going concern will probably be more beneficial than a break-up realisation of the company's assets. In each case, I think, the court must necessarily carry out a balancing exercise of the kind envisaged by Templeman J. in his judgment. Each case must depend upon its own particular facts.

Since the policy of the law is to procure so far as practicable rateable payments of the unsecured creditors' claims, it is, in my opinion, clear that the court should not validate any transaction or series of transactions which might result in one or more pre-liquidation creditors being paid in full at the expense of other creditors, who will only receive a dividend, in the absence of special circumstances making such a course desirable in the interests of the unsecured creditors as a body. If, for example, it were in the interests of the creditors generally that the company's business should be carried on, and this could only be achieved by paying for goods already supplied to the company when the petition is presented but not yet paid for, the court might think fit in the exercise of its discretion to validate payment for those goods.

Where a third party proposes to enter into a transaction with a company which is liable to be invalidated under section 227 of the Companies Act 1948, the third party can decline to do so until the company has obtained a validating order, or it might itself seek a validating order, or it can enter into the transaction in anticipation of the court making a retroactive validating order at a later date. In the present case the bank adopted the last course. A third party who does that takes the risk of the court refusing to make the order.

It may not always be feasible, or desirable, that a validating order should be sought before the transaction in question is carried out. The parties may be unaware at the time when the transaction is entered into that a petition has been presented; or the need for speedy action may be such as to preclude an anticipatory application; or the beneficial character of the transaction may be so obvious that there is no real prospect of a liquidator seeking to set it aside, so that an application to the court would waste time, money and effort. But in any case in which the transaction is carried out without an anticipatory validating order the disponee is at risk of the court declining to validate the transaction. It follows, in my view, that the parties when entering into the transaction, if they are aware that it is liable to be invalidated by the section, should have in mind the sort of considerations which would influence the court's decision. A disposition carried out in good faith in the ordinary course of business at a time when the parties are unaware that a petition has been presented may, it seems, normally be validated by the court (see In re Wiltshire Iron Co (1868) L.R. 3 Ch.App. 443; In re Neath Harbour Smelting and Rolling Works (1887) 56 L.T. 727, 729; In re Liverpool Civil Service Association (1874) L.R. 9 Ch.App. 511, 512) unless there is any ground for thinking that the transaction may involve an attempt to prefer the disponee, in which case the transaction would probably not be validated. In a number of cases reference has been made to the relevance of the policy of ensuring rateable distribution of the assets In re Civil Service and General Store Ltd (1888) 58 L.T. 220; In re Liverpool Civil Service Association, L.R. 9 Ch.App. 511 and In re J. Leslie Engineers Co. Ltd [1976] 1 W.L.R. 292 . In the last-mentioned case Oliver J. said, at p. 304:

“I think that in exercising discretion the court must keep in view the evident purpose of the section which, as Chitty J. said in In re Civil Service and General Store Ltd, 58 L.T. 220, 221, is to ensure that the creditors are paid pari passu.”

But although that policy might disincline the court to ratify any transaction which involved preferring a pre-liquidation creditor, it has no relevance to a transaction which is entirely post-liquidation, as for instance a sale of an asset at its full market value after presentation of a petition. Such a transaction involves no dissipation of the company's assets, for it does not reduce the value of those assets. It cannot harm the creditors and there would seem to be no reason why the court should not in the exercise of its discretion validate it. A fortiori, the court would be inclined to validate a transaction which would increase or has increased, the value of the company's assets, or which would preserve, or has preserved, the value of the company's assets from harm which would result from the company's business being paralysed: In re Wiltshire Iron Co (1868) L.R. 3 Ch.App. 443; In re Park Ward & Co. Ltd [1926] Ch. 828, where the business of the company was eventually sold as a going concern, presumably to the advantage of the creditors; In re Clifton Place Garage Ltd [1970] Ch. 477 . In In re A. I. Levy (Holdings) Ltd [1964] Ch. 19 the court validated a sale of a lease which was liable to forfeiture in the event of the tenant company being wound up, and also validated, as part of the transaction, payment out of the proceeds of sale of arrears of rent which had accrued before the presentation of the petition for the compulsory liquidation of the company. If that case was rightly decided, as I trust that it was, the court can in appropriate circumstances validate payment in full of an unsecured pre-liquidation debt which constitutes a necessary part of a transaction which as a whole is beneficial to the general body of unsecured creditors. But we have been referred to no case in which the court has validated payment in full of an unsecured pre-liquidation debt where there was no such special circumstance, and in my opinion it would not normally be right to do so, because such a payment would prefer the creditor whose debt is paid over the other creditors of equal degree.

Goff LJ and Sir David Cairns concurred.

== Comment ==
The decision in Gray's Inn was treated as authoritative for many years, but it has now been effectively overruled and superseded by Bank of Ireland v Hollicourt (Contracts) Ltd [2000] EWCA Civ 263.

== See also ==
- UK insolvency law
- Coutts & Co v Stock [2000] 1 WLR 906
- Hollicourt (Contracts) Ltd v Bank of Ireland [2000] EWCA Civ 263, [2001] Ch 555, [2001] 1 BCLC 233
