= Subject matter limitations in copyright law in Canada =

Copyright protection is limited to the certain subject matter in Canada. Generally, every original literary, dramatic, musical, and artistic work is protected under copyright law. Ideas and facts are not copyrightable, subject to a few exceptions.

== Statutory provisions ==
In the United States, the subject matter of copyright has been codified in s. 102 of the Copyright Act of 1976. That provision states in part that copyright does not exist in any idea, procedure, process, system, method of operation, concept, principle, or discovery, regardless of the form in which it is described, explained, illustrated, or embodied in such work.

In Canada, the Copyright Act does not have a similar provision, but courts have held that similar principles apply. In Delrina Corp. v. Triolet System Inc., the court explained that copyright does not subsist "in any arrangement, system, scheme, method for doing a particular thing, procedure, process, concept, principle, or discovery, but only in an author's original expression of them." See also section 64.1 (a) of the Copyright Act which provides that it is not an infringement of copyright to apply to a useful article features that are dictated solely by a utilitarian function and section 64.1 (d) that it is not an infringement of copyright to use any method or principle of manufacture or construction.

According to the Agreement on Trade-Related Aspects of Intellectual Property Rights (TRIPS), signed by both the United States and Canada, copyright protection extends to expressions and not to ideas, procedures, methods of operation, or mathematical concepts.

== Literary works ==
Copyright subsists in literary works. The Copyright Act specifies that literary works include tables, computer programs, books, and pamphlets, among other things. Still, the law on what constitutes a literary work is largely unsettled in Canada. In Hollinrake v. Truswell (1894), the court noted that a literary work is intended to afford either information and instruction, or pleasure, in the form of literary enjoyment.

In University of London Press v. University Tutorial Press (1916), the University of London sought copyright protection in examination papers, arguing that they were literary works. The court agreed, holding that literary work is "work which is expressed in print or writing, irrespective of the question whether the quality or style is high." This decision suggested that literary work should be interpreted broadly to include anything written down.

In 1982, in Bulman Group Ltd. v. One Write Systems Inc., the court noted that a mere printing or writing is not sufficient to classify as a literary work. Instead, there must be a literary sense of functionally assisting, guiding, or pointing the way to some end.

== Artistic work ==
The Copyright Act specifies that artistic works include paintings, drawings, maps, charts, plans, photos, engravings, sculptures, works of artistic craftsmanship, and architectural works, among other things. In DRG Inc v. Datafile, the plaintiff argued that there was copyright as an artistic work in his filing system that incorporated colours, numbers, and letters. The court held that the filing system was improper subject matter for copyright because it served a functional purpose. However, the plaintiff was claiming copyright in the design of the labels, not in the label itself. The court said that the design was an artistic work because the term "artistic work" is simply a general description of works that find expression in a visual medium. Artistic work does not require artistic quality. Accordingly, there was copyright in the graphic design of the labels, but not in the filing system as a whole.

== Unprotected subject matter ==
=== Functional tools ===
There is no copyright protection in a work that serves a functional purpose. For example, in Hollinrake v. Truswell, the plaintiff claimed copyright in a cardboard sleeve chart. The plaintiff argued that since there were words and instructions on the sleeve chart, including phrases like "measure round the thick part of the arm," it was a literary work. The court disagreed, holding that the sleeve chart was a measurement instrument, which is conceptually the same as a scale ruler. The sleeve chart was not used for the information it conveyed. The sleeve chart, however, gave no information or instruction, did not add to the stock of human knowledge, and did not afford literary enjoyment or pleasure. Because the sleeve chart was intended for practical use in the art of dressmaking, it was a mechanical contrivance or measuring tool.

=== Methods of operation ===
Copyright does not exist in a work that is a method of operation. According to Lotus v. Borland, a method of operation refers to the means by which a person operates something, whether it is a car, food processor, or computer. In that case, Lotus claimed copyright in its computer menu command hierarchy. The court held that even though the menu developer made some expressive choices in choosing and arranging the Lotus command terms, the menu was a method of operation. The menu did not just explain and present the functional capabilities; it also served as the method by which the program was operated and controlled. In fact, Lotus wrote its menu command hierarchy so that people could learn it and use it.

=== Words, titles, and short phrases ===
In the UK, Exxon Corpn et al v. Exxon Insurance Consultants stands for the principle that a single word, even if highly original and creative, cannot be considered a literary work. In that case, the plaintiff argued that there was copyright in the word "Exxon." The court held that the word standing alone had no copyright because it conveyed no information, provided no instruction, and gave no pleasure. According to the court, in order to give the word substance and meaning, it must be accompanied by other words or used in a particular context.

In another English case, NLA v. Meltwater, the court held that the headings or titles of newspaper articles may be separately protected as literary works because, in many cases, there is sufficient originality in the writing or conception of a title to an article. However, the outcome of Meltwater would be different in Canada.

In Canada, titles, names and short word combinations are usually not protected by copyright. A work or other subject matter must be something more substantial in order to merit the protection of copyright. However, s. 2 of the Copyright Act says that if a title is original and distinctive, it is protected as part of the work it relates to.

On the other hand, in the United States, names, titles, or short phrases are not protected by copyright even if they are novel or distinctive.

== Network effects and lock-in ==
Two economic phenomenon that are relevant to intellectual property and subject matter limitations in particular are network effects and lock-in. In fact, several courts have considered these principles in deciding IP cases.

=== Network effects ===
A network is a group of users who consume the same good. Direct network benefits exist when the utility that a user derives from consumption of a good increases with the number of other agents consuming the good. Common examples are communication devices such as telephones or fax machines. Indirect network effects exist when complementary products or infrastructure are needed in order to use a good. For example, software requires hardware, and cars require gas stations. The willingness to invest in the original product increases as the quality and variety of the complementary products increase.

Networks are likely to be too small if network effects are not internalized. As ownership is an ideal method of internalization, intellectual property laws, especially copyright, allow networks to function effectively.

DRG v. Datafile can be examined using the concept of network effects. If a person decided to implement Datafile's filing system in his/her office, the person would have to buy compatible labels. Other labels either would not be of use or would muddle the filing system. If the seller of the Datafile filing system could prevent others from selling the complementary labels, then the seller would raise the price of the complementary labels and make a higher profit. However, when the seller charges these above-market prices, other competitors may enter the market and try offering the good at a lower price (e.g., the defendant in this case).

=== Lock-in ===
Lock-in occurs when a customer is dependent on a vendor for products and is unable to use another vendor without incurring substantial switching costs or inconvenience.

A consideration of potential lock-in consequences was relevant to the decision of Lotus v. Borland. The court noted that if Lotus was granted a monopoly on its menu command hierarchy pattern, users who had learned Lotus' command structure would have been locked into Lotus. According to the court, this is similar to the way a typist who has learned the QWERTY keyboard would be the captive of anyone who had a monopoly on the production of such a keyboard.

Lock-in was also applicable to DRG v. Datafile. A business that used the Datafile filing system would incur significant costs in switching to another system because it would require training and time to become acquainted with a new system.
