= Hart v O'Connor =

Contract of New Zealand

- Court: Privy Council
- Full case name: Thomas Bruce Hart v Joseph O’Connor, Paul Michael O’Connor & Francis Joseph O’Connor
- Decided: 22 April 1985
- Citation: [1985] 1 NZLR 159, [1985] AC 1000, [1985] 3 WLR 214
- Transcript: Privy Council judgment

Court membership
- Judges sitting: Lord Scarman, Lord Bridge of Harwich, Lord Brightman, Sir Denys Buckley

Keywords
- mental capacity, unconscionable bargain

Hart v O'Connor [1985] UKPC 1 is an important case in New Zealand, also relevant for English contract law, regarding mental capacity to enter into contract as well as regarding unconscionable bargains, which was resolved through a judgment in the Privy Council.

== Facts ==
Jack O'Connor was the trustee of a trust that had owned the family farm in Waimate since their father died in 1911. Jack and his two brothers Dennis and Joseph both worked and lived on the farm owned by the trust. By the mid-1970s, the brothers were in their 70s and 80s, and given their advanced age, their solicitor recommended that something be done about the farm ownership. Jack essentially had three options: to lease out the farm, but that was ruled out as only delaying an inevitable sale; to sell the farm to his two nephews, which he ruled out, as he did not think his nephews could make a success out of the farm; and the third option, a sale to a third party.

As it turned out, a neighbour, Mr Hart was interested in buying the property and after negotiations with Jack and his solicitor, they arranged for the farm to be leased to Mr Hart, with a clause of right to purchase. Within a month, Mr Hart, unhappy with leasing the farm, contacted the vendor's solicitor to obtain an outright sale of the farm, and they later agreed to a sale at an unspecified price to be determined by a valuer. However, unknown to either Mr Hart or even Jack's own solicitor at the time, Jack was suffering from senile dementia. It was also later discovered that the sale conditions were arguably unfair, as the property was later sold for NZ$180,000 (rounded up from a valuation of NZ$179,780), when a subsequent valuation was NZ$197,000, and the purchaser only had to pay for the farm two years after he had taken possession, giving Mr Hart the benefit of any rise in farm prices in those two years. Jack subsequently died. After the two surviving brothers retained new solicitors, they subsequently took legal action to set aside the sale. While they were unsuccessful in the High Court, they were later successful in the Court of Appeal of New Zealand, which set aside the sale.

Mr Hart then appealed to the Privy Council.

== Advice ==
The Privy Council advised that the contract was not an unconscionable bargain. The Court said there were two types of "unfair" contracts: "procedural unfairness", where a benefit is obtained through undue influence, i.e., victimisation, and "contractual imbalance", where one party gets a more favourable outcome than the other party, i.e., a bargain. For such a contract to be set aside for unfairness, the second party had to be active in obtaining an unfair contract. In this case the Privy Council held that Mr. Hart's conduct was "beyond reproach", emphasising that most of the sale terms and conditions were proposed by the trust's own solicitor, which Mr Hart merely accepted.

Accordingly, the Court rescinded the Court of Appeal's ruling that the sale contract for the farm be set aside.

== See also ==
- English contract law
- English unjust enrichment
