= Norton Tool Co Ltd v Tewson =

- Court: National Industrial Relations Court
- Citations: [1972] EW Misc 1, [1972] ICR 501

Keywords
- Unfair dismissal

Norton Tool Co Ltd v Tewson [1972] EW Misc 1 is a UK labour law case, concerning unfair dismissal and the measure of damages as a remedy.

== Judgment ==
Sir John Donaldson held that loss of pride and injury to feelings may not be compensated. An employee can get damages for (a) immediate loss of wages (b) the manner of dismissal (c) future loss of wages (d) loss of protection for unfair dismissal or redundancy dismissal.
