= John Brightman, Baron Brightman =

British barrister and judge

The Right Honourable The Lord Brightman PC

Member of the House of Lords
- Lord Temporal
- Lord of Appeal in Ordinary; 12 March 1982 – 19 June 1986

Personal details
- Born: 20 June 1911
- Died: 6 February 2006 (aged 94)

John Anson Brightman, Baron Brightman, PC (20 June 1911 – 6 February 2006) was a British barrister and judge who served as a law lord between 1982 and 1986.

== Early life and career ==
Brightman was born in Sandridge, Hertfordshire, the son of William Henry Brightman, a solicitor, and of Minnie Boston Brightman, née Way. He was educated at Doon House School in Kent, Marlborough College, and St John's College, Cambridge, where he read law. He was called to the bar at Lincoln's Inn in 1932. He then joined the chambers of Fergus Morton, later a law lord, and practised at the Chancery bar.

During World War II, he volunteered as an able seaman in the Merchant Navy from 1939 to 1940, then was commissioned into the Royal Naval Volunteer Reserve, serving on convoy in the Atlantic and the Mediterranean. In 1944, he attended the Royal Naval staff course at Greenwich, and was promoted to lieutenant commander to become assistant naval attaché in Ankara. He returned to the bar in 1946, mainly practising trusts and taxation law, and took silk in 1961. He was appointed Attorney-General of the Duchy of Lancaster, but relinquished the post on his appointment to the bench in 1970.

While at the bar, Brightman was pupil master to Margaret Thatcher, who was his first female pupil.

== Judicial career ==
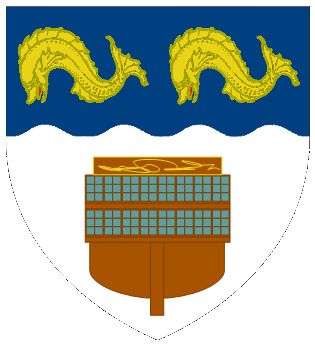
Arms, as displayed at Lincoln's Inn

Brightman was appointed a High Court judge in 1970 and assigned to the Chancery Division, receiving the customary knighthood. In 1971, he joined John Donaldson and Lord Thomson as the three judges of the National Industrial Relations Court (NIRC), set up by the government of Edward Heath to reign in the power of the trades unions.

In 1972, he decided that Bobby Moore and Geoff Hurst need not pay income tax on bonuses and cash gifts received following the victory of the England national football team in the 1966 FIFA World Cup.

In 1974, while still a High Court judge, he refused Anton Piller KG the court order that it requested to search the premises of a defendant to prevent the defendant from destroying potential evidence. He was overruled by Lord Denning's Court of Appeal, giving rise to the Anton Piller order that remains in use today.

Like his colleague on the NIRC, John Donaldson, Brightman had to wait until shortly after Thatcher won the 1979 general election in 1979 to be appointed as Lord Justice of Appeal. Brightman became a Lord of Appeal in Ordinary and life peer, sitting in the House of Lords as Baron Brightman, of Ibthorpe in the County of Hampshire, from 12 March 1982, the same year that Donaldson was promoted to become Master of the Rolls.

One of Brightman's first judgments, in 1983, was to decide that Ann Mallalieu (later Baroness Mallalieu) was not entitled to a tax deduction for the cost of her court dress.

He also ruled against the taxpayer in the case of Furniss v Dawson; upheld the manslaughter verdict in R v Hancock and Shankland, the case of a taxi driver killed during the 1984 miners' strike, modifying the test of intent required for a conviction of murder; and joined the majority judgment that refused to grant the government an order banning on newspaper articles about Spycatcher in 1988.

== Personal life ==
He married Roxane Ambatielo in 1945 and they had one son.
