= Buckley LJ =

Lord Justice Buckley or Buckley LJ may refer to either of two British judges:

- Henry Buckley, 1st Baron Wrenbury, PC, KC (1845–1935)
- His son, the Rt Hon Sir Denys Buckley (1906–1998)
