= National Industrial Relations Court =

The National Industrial Relations Court (NIRC) was established on 1 December 1971 under Section 99 of the Industrial Relations Act 1971. The NIRC was created by the Conservative government of Edward Heath as a way to limit the power of trade unions in the United Kingdom. It was abolished by the Trade Union and Labour Relations Act 1974 soon after the Labour government of Harold Wilson came to power in 1974.

== History ==
The NIRC was introduced by the Industrial Relations Act 1971 which was a key part of the Heath government's modernisation programme that aimed to introduce greater regulation of trade unions. Unions saw the proposals as undue state interference. The legislation was widely protested against even while still in Parliament and its powers ended up being infrequently used; eventually, even the government acknowledged that much of the act would need to be amended.

The NIRC itself was established on 1 December 1971 by secondary legislation under the Industrial Relation Act. The court's president John Donaldson made a statement stressing the institutions focus on conciliation and the informal aspects of the court's approach. The court started off with a backlog of 48 appeals from industrial tribunals regarding the Redundancy Payments Act 1965, which had been originally assigned to the dockets of the High Court or Court of Session but were reassigned to the NIRC following its creation. Eight of the appeals decisions were officially reported (meaning the case established a new legal rule or principle) and only one of them, Woodhouse v Peter Brotherhood Ltd [1972] ICR 186, was successfully appealed to the Court of Appeal.

In its first three months, only three cases were brought to the NIRC under the Industrial Relations Act: Car Collection v Transport & General Workers Union [1972] ICR 135; National Union of Bank Employees v United Dominions Trust, which was withdrawn before trial in favour of conciliation; and C.A. Parsons & Co. Ltd v Amalgamated Union of Engineering Workers and others [1972] ICR 143.

The possibility of the government submitting an emergency application to the court to intervene in the 1972 miners' strike after the publication of the Wilberforce Report on 18 February meant that the court "put itself on full standby" that night but the strike ended up being settled without the NIRC's involvement.

On 28 February 1972, further secondary legislation brought most of the remaining parts of the Industrial Relations Act into force giving the NIRC two new jurisdictions: 'rights of workers' (which included unfair dismissal) and 'unfair industrial practices'.

As part of the protests against the legislation, the Trades Union Congress (TUC) promoted a policy of non-compliance, resulting in an effective boycott of the NIRC. Initially, TUC-affiliated unions were not allowed to cooperate with the NIRC at all, including to defend themselves. This was relaxed in April 1972 when the court threatened to sequester the assets of the Transport and General Workers' Union (TGWU) if it did not pay its fine for contempt of court by 4 May; the TGWU then represented itself before the court on 3 May. Some unions, such as the Amalgamated Union of Engineering Workers (AUEW), kept boycotting the NIRC.

By 1974, the Industrial Relations Act had been discredited and, when the Labour Party returned to government in 1974, it repealed it (therefore abolishing the NIRC) with the Trade Union and Labour Relations Act 1974.

== Composition and powers ==
Its first and only President was John Donaldson, supported by John Brightman (both High Court judges who later became Law Lords) and Lord Thomson, a judge of the Scottish Court of Session. The court also had nine appointed lay members, and one of the three judges sat with a lay panel. The court hearings were in public, but its procedure was relatively informal, with neither the judge nor barristers wearing wigs or gowns.

Unusually, the court's jurisdiction extended throughout the UK, making no distinction between England and Wales or Scotland. The NIRC could also sit anywhere in Great Britain although cases were almost always held in the court's rooms on Chancery Lane, London or at its Scotland branch which was initially in Edinburgh and then in Glasgow from mid-1972. There was only one exception to this: Powell Duffryn v House and others, which was heard in Cardiff in December 1972.

It was empowered to grant injunctions as necessary to prevent injurious strikes and to settle a variety of labour disputes. It also heard appeals from the industrial tribunals.

When negotiations between unions and employers had failed, the government could apply to the court for a 'cooling off period' where the court ordered any industrial action to be deferred for up to 60 days. The court could order a secret ballot to be held in cases industrial action where there was risk of serious public disorder, where there was doubt as to the level of support for strikes, or where disputes were seen as a threat to the national economy, health or security.

== Notable cases ==
=== Norton Tool Co Ltd v Tewson ===
One of the leading legal decisions of the NIRC was Norton Tool Co Ltd v Tewson [1972] ICR, in which Donaldson J ruled that damages for wrongful dismissal only extended to financial loss, and that compensation was not available for non-pecuniary losses, such as injury to pride or feelings. This position was doubted by Lord Hoffmann in Johnson v Unisys Ltd [2003] 1 AC 518, but upheld in Dunnachie v Kingston-upon-Hull City Council [2004] UKHL 36.

=== Goad v AUEW ===
Goad v Amalgamated Union of Engineering Workers (AUEW) [1972] ICR 429 was an unfair industrial practices case which was lodged with the NIRC on 11 September 1972, during the court's vacation.

James Goad, a member of the AUEW, sought an order to force the union to allow him to attend branch meetings, affirming a ruling from an industrial tribunal. Under sections 65 and 66 of the Industrial Rights Act, it was an unfair industrial practice to prevent a union member attending a branch meeting. The Economist reported that if the AUEW had defended itself, it could probably have shown that the exclusion from branch meetings was not arbitrary but because Goad had failed to pay his union dues three times and because he had worked during a strike.

It was first heard on 3 October, with Goad giving evidence on 30 October and the AUEW ordered to appear on 8 November. The AUEW, continuing their policy of non-cooperation with the court as mandated by the union's national committee, did not appear in court or put up a defence and NIRC found them in contempt and fined them £5000. When Goad was again refused entry to a branch meeting on 30 November, the court fined the AUEW £50000 plus costs of £5000. None of the fines were paid voluntarily and some had to be sequestered from stock-holdings which was approved at a hearing on 21 December, the court's last day in session for the year.

== Controversies ==
The NIRC was controversial throughout its short life. Donaldson, the president of the court, was known to have Conservative leanings, having stood as a Parliamentary candidate for the Conservative party and, indeed, having contributed to the drafting of the Industrial Relations Act. Many cases were decided against the trades unions, although the unions had a policy of not co-operating with, and in many cases ignoring, the court.

=== Pentonville Five ===
In July 1972, a dispute involving the dock workers union led to five shop stewards being imprisoned in Pentonville Prison for contempt of court. The NIRC had previously ordered seven dockworkers to stop picketing the premises of Midland Cold Storage Company in Hackney, London. When they did not, five were held in contempt of court in hearings from 19 to 21 July while two remained free due to a lack of evidence. Three of the five (Derek Watkins, Tony Merrick and Conny Clancy) were arrested at the Midland Cold Storage site on 21 July, while the two other (Bernie Steer and Vic Turner) were arrested later.

The arrest of the workers prompted immediate walk-outs in several industries and protests outside Pentonville Prison, where the workers were being held. The TUC called for a general strike on 31 July.

The Official Solicitor applied to the NIRC on the afternoon of 26 July for the Pentonville Five to be released, mainly on the grounds that the Law Lords overturned a Court of Appeal ruling that morning and had judged that trade unions were primarily responsible for the unlawful behaviour of their shop stewards. The five dockers were subsequently released, and "borne from the prison in triumph".

The dispute helped to discredit the NIRC and has been named as a defining moment in post-war industrial relations. In 2001 letters to J. A. G. Griffith, Donaldson expressed that he felt he had been "faced with a catch 22 situation". He said that if he had fined the dockers according to their means, "they would have a quick whip round in the pub and hold the court up to derision" and that if he had fined them harshly, he would have been criticised for being "oppressive". As such, Donaldson said that at the time he saw a custodial sentence as the only answer to the dilemma but that in hindsight he would have imposed a small fine and then imprisoned the workers if they had kept ignoring the court order.
