= Catamaran Cruisers Ltd v Williams =

UK labour law case

- Court: Employment Appeal Tribunal
- Citation: [1994] IRLR 384

Keywords
- Redundancy

Catamaran Cruisers Ltd v Williams [1994] IRLR 384 is a UK labour law case, concerning redundancy.

== Facts ==
Catamaran Cruises Ltd operated ferries and pleasure cruises on the Thames. French owners bought it following a near insolvency. Transport and General Workers' Union representatives had agreed new contract terms, offered to all employees. Seven claimants refused the new terms and were dismissed.

The Tribunal held the reason for offering the new terms was financial exigency, business efficiency and profitability and that the dismissals were unfair.

== Judgment ==
Tudor Evans J held that a broader balancing test for what was "fair" was appropriate under ERA 1996 s 98(4) and that this dismissal was fair. He quoted with approval Balcombe J in Chubb Fire Security Ltd v Harper and said the following:

It may be perfectly reasonable for an employee to decline to work extra overtime, having regard to his family commitments. Yet, from the employment point of view, having regard to his business commitments, it may be perfectly reasonable to require an employee to work overtime.
