= Lambert v Co-op Insurance Society Ltd =

English contract law case

Lambert v Co-operative Insurance Society Ltd
- Court: Court of Appeal (England and Wales)
- Citations: [1975] EWCA Civ J0122-2, [1975] 2 Lloyd's Rep 485

Court membership
- Judges sitting: Cairns, Lawton, MacKenna

Keywords
- Misrepresentation, insurance, uberrimae fidei

Lambert v Co-operative Insurance Society Ltd [1975] EWCA Civ J0122-2, [1975] 2 Lloyd's Rep 485 is an English contract law case concerning the duty of an applicant for insurance to disclose facts material to the estimation of the risk.

== Facts ==
Mrs Lambert signed a proposal form for an all risks insurance policy covering jewellery owned by her and her husband, without mentioning that her husband had been convicted of receiving stolen cigarettes and was fined £25. The Co-op issued the policy. Mr Lambert was convicted of two more dishonesty offences in 1971 and sentenced to 15 months in jail. Mrs Lambert did not reveal this either when the policy was renewed in 1972. In April 1972 some items worth £311 were lost or stolen and the Co-op refused her claim on the basis of a failure to disclose.

== Judgment ==
Justice Brian MacKenna held that Lambert was under a duty of disclosure, but "[t]he extent of the duty is the matter in controversy". MacKenna discussed several possible standards for disclosure, but felt that ultimately the formulation in the Marine Insurance Act 1906 should prevail because there was no difference between this insurance and marine insurance in principle. The insured must disclose to the insurer every material circumstance, and a circumstance is material if it would affect the insurer's decision regarding the amount of the premium or whether to assume the risk.

He did however say the law was unsatisfactory, and that the Co-op were doing "a heartless thing [...] but that is their business, not mine".

Later academic commentary noted that a non-expert customer of insurance might not know what an expert insurer would consider material—presenting the problem that even a person acting in good faith could fail to uphold their duty.

== See also ==
- English contract law
- Misrepresentation in English law
