= Mascall v Mascall =

Appeal of legal case [1984] re: formalities in English law

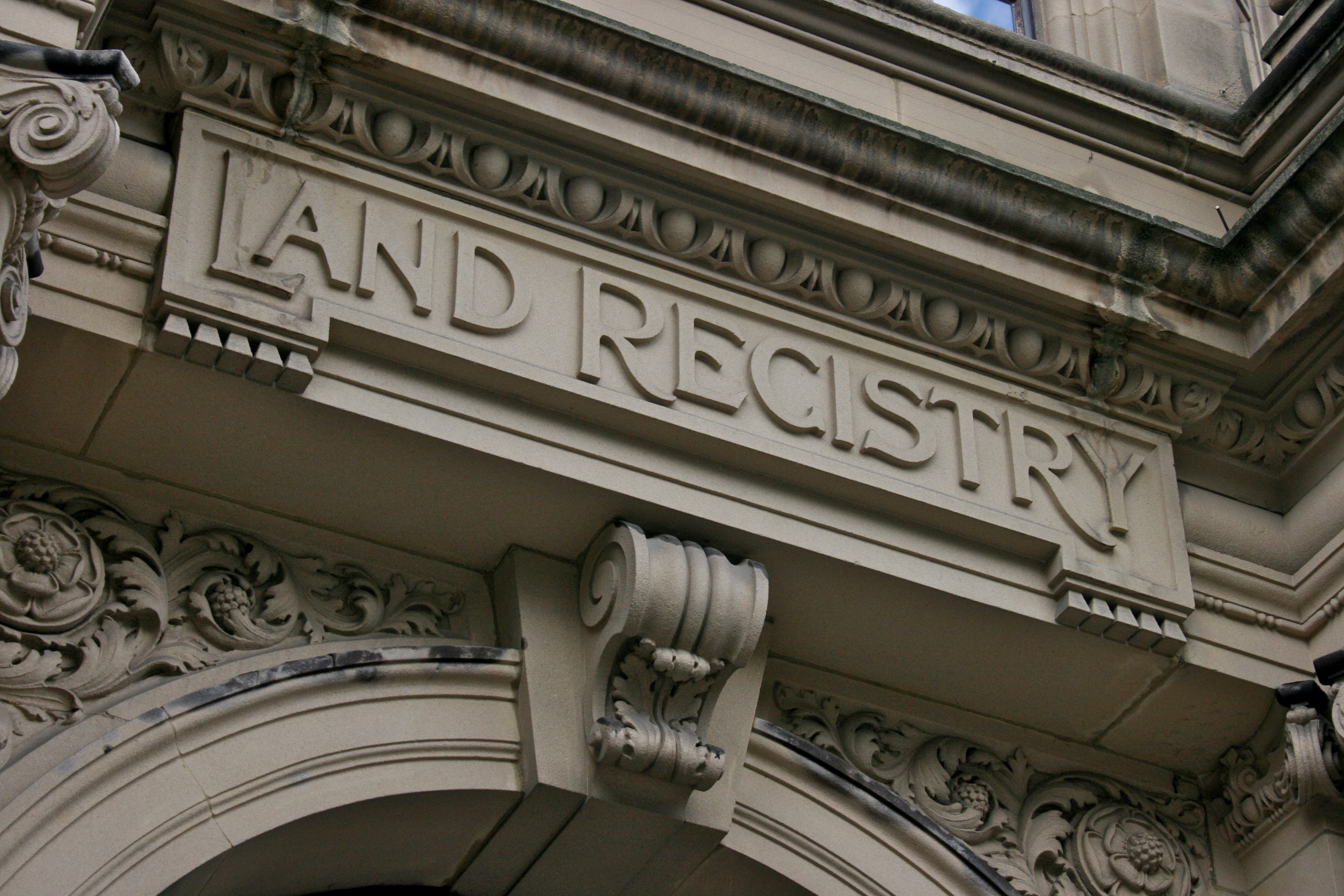
- The deed's registration was objected to by the maker with the Land Registry (one of its stone-carved signs is pictured), as is needed to give it guaranteed effect against all third parties
- Court: Court of Appeal
- Full case name: William James Mascall v William Mascall
- Decided: 13 June 1984
- Citations: [1984] EWCA Civ 10, (1984) 50 P&CR 119

Case history
- Prior action: Judgment by Edward Nugee Q.C. sitting in the Chancery Division. Claim by the appellant denied. (unreported)

Court membership
- Judges sitting: Lawton LJ, Browne Wilkinson LJ, Sir Denys Buckley

Keywords
- formalities of deeds; gift (transfer at an undervalue, in fact for no real sum); rescindability at will; perfection of imperfect gifts; whether perfection only possible by completed registration; no third parties

Mascall v Mascall [1984] EWCA Civ 10 was an appeal on formalities in English law. The final, registration stage of a witnessed deed of transfer (of land) is not imperative in all circumstances, the court confirmed. Those circumstances include that there must be no detriment to a third party bona fide purchaser or mortgagee for value without notice; and there must be no fraud or abuse of trust as defined by law. It has wider resonance with the formalities of Trusts in English law.

== Facts ==
A father wished to transfer (at an undervalue) land to his son. He made and gave him an executed deed of transfer (and as further show of intent the land certificate). Then they fell out, and the father changed his mind. The son had not yet gone through with the registration at HM Land Registry as the Stamp Office wrongly rejected the transfer, namely sending it to the father who was the party but not the applicant. The father argued that it was still his property.

== Judgment ==
Argument on consideration (value or not passed in exchange for the property):

The judge treated it as common ground the father had no expectation to get £9,000: there was no evidence to that effect. At appeal it was ruled the contrary argument was barred, given the "receipt" for the £9,000 in the transfer deed. Moreover, the evidence showed quite clearly that it was explained to the plaintiff/appellant, the father, before the transaction was carried through that it was being carried through on the basis that he was treated as having received £9,000...it was simply not open to the father, in those circumstances, to raise the question of non payment.

Remaining substantive arguments: Lawton LJ and Browne-Wilkinson LJ gave concurring judgments, upholding the court below, that the property belonged to the son in equity, and was held on trust for the son by the father, because the father had done everything in his power to make the transfer effective. Although without registration, legal title had not passed, title had passed in equity and the father could not take back his agreement.

Sir Denys Buckley concurred.

== See also ==
- English trust law
