= Market Investigations Ltd v Minister for Social Security =

UK labour law case

- Court: High Court of Justice
- Citation: [1969] 2 QB 173

Court membership
- Judge sitting: Cooke J

Keywords
- Contract of employment

Market Investigations Ltd v Minister for Social Security [1969] 2 QB 173 is a UK labour law case which was heard as a challenge to a decision by the Government that employed National Insurance contributions were due on the payments to the worker. It took the view that establishing the common-law employment status of an employment contract requires attention to a multiple list of factors. In some regards this judgement appears to undermine the three-step reasoning in Ready Mixed Concrete (South East) Ltd v Minister of Pensions and National Insurance (RMC), which was decided the previous year. However, 'Market Investigations' involved implying the companies best-practice handbook into each of the separate contracts between the parties, whereas 'RMC' was judged purely by rational construction of the agreed terms of a lengthy written contract, against the background of the written contract as a whole.

== Facts ==
Anne Irving from time to time conducted market research questionnaires. There was a dispute between the business for whom she did the surveys, Market Investigations, and the Minister for Social Security, over whether National Insurance contributions should have been made on her behalf. This depended on whether she was an employee.

== Judgment ==
The up-front ratio decidendi of the judgment was that Market Investigations (MI) were mistaken in their belief that they did not have a right of control over Irving. The 'Guide for Interviewers' which Cooke, J implied into the terms of the contracts was a comprehensive prescription for how the work MUST be done. Therefore, MI had a clear right of control over Irving, which meant that the contracts with her were contracts of service, and were subject to the National Insurance provisions for employed persons.

The case did not create any precedent, but Cooke, J included the following remark at the end of his brief review of the authorities. "The observations of Lord Wright, of Denning, L.J. and of the Judges of the (US) Supreme Court suggest that the fundamental test to be applied is this: "Is the person who has engaged themselves to perform these services performing them as a person in business on their own account?" After establishing that the contracts which MI concluded with Irving were for personal service, and gave MI a decisive right of control over her, Cooke, J looked to see whether the 'fundamental test' that he had adumbrated would strengthen or weaken the answer which consideration of the right of control had revealed. He found that there was nothing in the case which showed that the contracts were made with Irving, as a person in business on her own account, and therefore the decision based on control was sound.

Interestingly, the first page summary of the case rearranged the order of Cooke, J's actual reasoning. In doing so it obscured the importance of the 'right of control' to Cooke, J's decision, giving prominence to the later review of whether Irving provided her services as a person in business on her own account. The Judgement runs from page 173 to page 188 of Vol 2 of the Queen's Bench Reports of 1969.

== See also ==
- Contract of employment in English law
- UK labour law
- EU labour law
- US labor law
- German labour law
