= Stonegate Securities Ltd v Gregory =

- Court: Court of Appeal
- Citation: [1980] Ch 576

Case opinions
- Buckley LJ

Keywords
- Liquidation, winding up petition

Stonegate Securities Ltd v Gregory [1980] Ch 576 is a UK insolvency law case concerning the liquidation procedure when a company is unable to repay its debts. It held that a winding up petition would not be granted to a petitioner to whom a debt was bona fide under dispute.

== Facts ==
Mr Gregory in accordance with Companies Act 1948, section 223 (now Insolvency Act 1986, section 123) served a notice demanding payment of a £33,000 debt within 21 days. Stonegate had agreed to buy shares in Mr Gregory’s property company, Trinette Ltd, when it got planning permission. The company accepted there was a contingent or prospective liability, but argued the debt was not presently due. At the first instance Mr Gregory accepted that there was a dispute about when the debt was due, and insofar as the debt was contingent, that the contingency might never happen at all. The company sought interlocutory relief restraining the petition.

Blackett-Ord VC found there was a bona fide dispute about whether Mr Gregory was a creditor for a sum presently due and granted the injunction, provided that in three weeks the company would make a declaration of solvency. The company appealed.

== Judgment ==
Buckley LJ held that Insolvency Act 1986, section 122 had ‘no application to a case in which the creditor is a creditor in respect of a sum which is not presently due…’ The claim by Mr Gregory had to fail because ‘if the company in good faith and on substantial grounds disputes any liability in respect of the alleged debt, the petition will be dismissed or, if the matter is brought before a court before the petition is issued, its presentation will in normal circumstances be restrained.’

The relevant statutory provisions are contained in sections 222, 223 and 224 of the Companies Act 1948, section 222, as is very familiar, provides that a company may be wound up by the court if "( e ) the company is unable to pay its debts." Section 223 provides that a company shall be deemed to be unable to pay its debts if, among other things, a creditor to whom the company is indebted in a sum exceeding £50 then due - and I emphasise those last two words - has served a statutory demand upon the company and the company has failed for three weeks to comply with it. That provision has no application to a case in which the creditor is a creditor in respect of a sum which is not presently due. Section 224 (1) indicates who may present a winding up petition, and it provides that an application for the winding up of a company shall be by petition presented either by the company or by any creditor or contributory of the company. Then there are provisos, and proviso (c) is in the following terms:

"The court shall not give a hearing to a winding up petition presented by a contingent or prospective creditor until such security for costs has been given as the court thinks reasonable and until a prima facie case for winding up has been established to the satisfaction of the court."

In that context, in my opinion, the expression "contingent creditor" means a creditor in respect of a debt which will only become due in an event which may or may not occur; and a "prospective creditor" is a creditor in respect of a debt which will certainly become due in the future, either on some date which has been already determined or on some date determinable by reference to future events.

Where a creditor petitions for the winding up of a company, the proceedings will take one of two courses, depending upon whether the petitioner is a creditor whose debt is presently due, or one whose debt is contingent or prospective by reason of the proviso in paragraph (c) of section 224 (1) . If the creditor petitions in respect of a debt which he claims to be presently due, and that claim is undisputed, the petition proceeds to hearing and adjudication in the normal way; but if the company in good faith and on substantial grounds disputes any liability in respect of the alleged debt, the petition will be dismissed or, if the matter is brought before a court before the petition is issued, its presentation will in normal circumstances be restrained. That is because a winding up petition is not a legitimate means of seeking to enforce payment of a debt which is bona fide disputed.

Ungoed-Thomas J put the matter thus in Mann v Goldstein [1968] 1 WLR 1091, 1098-1099:

"For my part, I would prefer to rest the jurisdiction directly on the comparatively simple propositions that a creditor's petition can only be presented by a creditor, that the winding up jurisdiction is not for the purpose of deciding a disputed debt (that is, disputed on substantial and not insubstantial grounds), since, until a creditor is established as a creditor he is not entitled to present the petition and has no locus standi in the Companies Court; and that, therefore, to invoke the winding up jurisdiction when the debt is disputed (that is, on substantial grounds) or after it has become clear that it is so disputed is an abuse of the process of the court."

I gratefully adopt the whole of that statement, although I think it could equally well have ended at the reference to want of locus standi. In my opinion a petition founded on a debt which is disputed in good faith and on substantial grounds is demurrable for the reason that the petitioner is not a creditor of the company within the meaning of section 224 (1) at all, and the question whether he is or is not a creditor of the company is not appropriate for adjudication in winding up proceedings.

The circumstances may, however, be such that the company adopts an intermediate position, denying that the debt is presently due but not denying that it will or may become due in the future - in other words, accepting it as a contingent or prospective debt. The present case is of the last-mentioned kind and the present appeal involves consideration of what is proper in such a case.

On January 25, 1979, the defendant served upon the company a notice in the following terms:

"Take notice that you are required to pay Philip Howard Gregory" - and an address is given - "within 21 days from the date of this notice the sum of £33,000 which sum is due and owing by you to Philip Howard Gregory. Take notice that this notice is served in accordance with the provisions of section 223 (a) of the Companies Act 1948."

That is clearly a notice which affirms that the whole of the sum of £33,000 was presently due and owing from the company to the defendant; indeed, it was only upon that basis that such a statutory demand could have been served.

The debt of £33,000 relied upon is said to have arisen out of a transaction relating to certain shares in a company called Trinette Ltd., which were sold by the defendant to the company. In February 1972 it appears that the defendant was the holder of 24 shares out of the total issued share capital of 100 shares of Trinette Ltd., and he agreed to sell those 24 shares to the company for £80,000. That agreement was later modified by mutual agreement between the parties so that the sale was restricted to 14 only of the shares and the purchase price was reduced from £80,000 to £67,000. Trinette Ltd. was a company engaged in a speculative development of certain land and had the benefit of a contract connected with that project, but no planning permission had at that time been obtained. By the agreement that was entered into in July 1972 modifying the original sale agreement, it was provided that completion of the transfer of the 14 shares which were then to be sold should take place following the grant of outline planning permission in respect of the development; and it was further provided that £35,000, part of the £67,000 purchase price, would be payable on completion and that the balance of the consideration, £32,000, would become payable upon the acquisition by Trinette Ltd. of the whole of the proposed site or such part of it as would enable Trinette Ltd. to proceed with, and complete, the re-development in accordance with the outline planning consent.

In 1973 the company paid the defendant £17,500, part of the purchase price payable under the agreement - that is to say, half of the £35,000 - and in May of that year the 14 shares were transferred to the plaintiff company. It was then agreed that the balance of £17,500, the other half of the £35,000, should be paid only on obtaining detailed planning consent for the development, so that was a further modification of the sale agreement and, as the judge pointed out in his judgment, nobody could foresee whether the £17,500 which was to be paid on detailed planning permission being obtained would become payable before the £32,000, or whether the £32,000 would become payable before the £17,500. There were various payments made to the defendant on account during 1974 and 1975, and in 1976 there was a further agreement between the parties that the purchase price should be reduced by the sum of £5,500. Allowing for that, the judge said that there was left outstanding under the sale agreement a sum of £33,000, of which it was suggested that at least £1,000 must be payable forthwith. The company now admits that the defendant is a contingent creditor at any rate in a sum of £33,000, but not that any part of that sum is immediately due. The defendant alleges that at least some part of the £33,000 is immediately due, but Blackett-Ord V.-C. held that this was not established on the evidence, and the defendant now accepts that there is a bona fide dispute as to whether any part of the £33,000 is now due, and he further admits that in so far as the debt is contingent, the relevant contingency may never happen. So the situation is such that the defendant cannot petition to wind the company up on the basis that he is a debtor for a sum which is presently due, because that position is disputed in good faith and on substantial grounds; but he is competent to petition as a contingent creditor.

[...]

If the only established footing upon which the defendant can petition to wind up the company is as a contingent or prospective creditor, the burden rests on him to show prima facie that there is a case for winding up the company If the ground for seeking a winding up order is that the company is unable to pay its debts - and no other ground is suggested here - it would be incumbent on the defendant to establish a prima facie case that this was so. The condition of Blackett-Ord V.-C.'s order seems to me to reverse this burden of proof, for if the condition is not complied with it would be open to the defendant as a petitioner to rely upon that fact as some evidence of the company's inability to pay its debts; and moreover, having regard to the nature of the declaration of solvency which I have mentioned, the condition imposes upon the company, through its directors, a heavier burden of proof than the burden of establishing merely that the company is not commercially solvent; it imposes the burden of proof of establishing that the company will ultimately be solvent on the basis of a prospective liquidation within 12 months. It seems to me that such a condition cannot be supported in principle.

[...]

The whole of the doctrine of this part of the law is based upon the view that winding up proceedings are not suitable proceedings in which to determine a genuine dispute about whether the company does or does not owe the sum in question; and equally I think it must be true that winding up proceedings are not suitable proceedings in which to determine whether that liability is an immediate liability or only a prospective or contingent liability. It might be that in some cases the point was so simple and straightforward that the winding up court might be able to deal with it, but I feel certain that it cannot be right to say that, in a case where there is a dispute of that nature, the only course which the court to which application is made to restrain presentation of the petition can follow is to leave it to the Companies Court to resolve all the issues between the parties. Accordingly, I do not think that the observations of Goulding J. in the paragraph that have read can be regarded as satisfactory.

Goff LJ and Sir David Cairns concurred.

== See also ==
- UK insolvency law
