= Alexander Thomson, Lord Thomson =

Scottish advocate and judge

Alexander Thomson, Lord Thomson (9 November 1914 – 2 February 1979) was a Scottish advocate and judge. He was a Senator of the College of Justice from 1965 until his death in 1979. He had been Sheriff of Renfrew and Argyll from 1962 to 1964 and Dean of the Faculty of Advocates from 1964 to 1965.

He was one of the three judges of the short-lived National Industrial Relations Court.
