= Brian MacKenna =

Irish-born British barrister and judge (1905 – 1989)

Sir Bernard Joseph Maxwell MacKenna (12 September 1905 – 20 October 1989), known as Sir Brian MacKenna, was an Irish-born British barrister and judge. He was a justice of the High Court, sitting in the Queen's Bench Division from 1961 to 1977.

== Biography ==
Born in Ireland, MacKenna became a ward of chancery at a young age after the death of his father. He was educated at Clongowes Wood College, University College, Dublin, in Germany, and at New College, Oxford, where he was secretary of the Oxford Union. Having opted to set up practice in London instead of Dublin, MacKenna was called to the bar by the Inner Temple in January 1932 and joined the Western Circuit. After pupillage with James Tucker, he joined the chambers of Walter Monckton, with whom MacKenna worked closely. He was made a Queen's Counsel in 1950 and elected a Master of the Bench of the Inner Temple in 1958.

MacKenna was appointed to the High Court in 1961 and received the customary knighthood. As a judge, he was critical of harsh sentencing, and in retirement was active within the Howard League. He produced a report, Justice in Prison, in 1983, for the League.

He died in 1989, having never married. After his death, his large personal library was auctioned by Christie's in 1998.

== Selected cases ==
- Ready Mixed Concrete (South East) Ltd v Minister of Pensions and National Insurance [1968] 2 QB 497
- Lambert v Co-operative Insurance Society Ltd [1975] 2 Lloyd's Rep 485
