= Montreal v Montreal Locomotive Works Ltd =

- Court: Privy Council
- Citation: [1944] UKPC 44 [1947] 1 DLR 161

Keywords
- Agent, employee

Montreal v Montreal Locomotive Works Ltd [1944] UKPC 44 is a Privy Council case relating to tax and commercial business, but of interest to Canadian and UK labour law on the definition for employees.

== Facts ==
The City of Montreal claimed taxes from Montreal Locomotive Works Ltd, which built a plant to manufacture tanks and gun carriages for the Minister of Munitions and Supply of Canada, "for and on behalf of the Government and as its agent". If the company was occupying the premises where it built the plant merely as an agent, then it would not be liable for tax, but if it was carrying on business on its own behalf it could, under the British North America Act section 125.

The Supreme Court of Canada held that the company was merely an agent.

== Advice ==
The Privy Council advised that the company was not liable for tax, and had to be regarded as an agent. Lord Wright delivered the advice, and said the following.

The great difference of opinion on this question in the Courts below illustrates the difficulty which is inherent in deciding questions like this. In earlier cases a single test, such as the presence or absence of control, was often relied on to determine whether the case was one of master and servant, mostly in order to decide issues of tortious liability on the part of the master or superior. In the more complex conditions of modern industry, more complicated tests have often to be applied. It has been suggested that a fourfold test would in some cases be more appropriate, a complex involving (1) control; (2) ownership of the tools; (3) chance of profit; (4) risk of loss. Control in itself is not always conclusive. Thus the master of a chartered vessel is generally the employee of the shipowner though the charter can direct the employment of the vessel. Again the law often limits the employer's right to interfere with the employee's conduct, as also do trade union regulations. In many cases the question can only be settled by examining the whole of the various elements which constitute the relationship between the parties. in this way it is in some cases possible to decide the issue by raising as the crucial question whose business is it, or in other words by asking whether the party is carrying on the business, in the sense of carrying it on for himself or on his own behalf and not merely for a superior. In the present case the business or undertaking is in the manufacture of the warlike vehicles. The respondent might have been making them with a view to selling them to the Government for its own profit.... The respondent supplied no funds and took no financial risk and no liability, with the significant exception of bad faith or wanton neglect: every other risk was taken by the Government.

== See also ==
- UK labour law
