= David Cairns (judge) =

British judge and Liberal Party politician (1902–87)

Cairns in 1954

Sir David Arnold Scott Cairns (5 March 1902 – 8 September 1987), was a British judge and Liberal Party politician.

== Background ==
Cairns was the son of David Cairns JP, a Freeman of Sunderland, and Sarah Scott Cairns. He was educated at Bede Grammar School for Boys in Sunderland and at Pembroke College, Cambridge. In 1932, he married Irene Cathery Phillips; the couple had one son and two daughters. He was knighted in 1955 and appointed to the Privy Council in 1970.

== Political career ==
He was Liberal candidate for the Epsom division of Surrey at the 1947 Epsom by-election.

1947 Epsom by-election
Party	Candidate	Votes	%	±%
Conservative	Malcolm McCorquodale	33,633	61.0	+11.1
Labour	R Bishop	17,339	31.5	−6.3
Liberal	David Cairns	4,121	7.5	−4.7
Majority		16,447	33.0	
Turnout		16,294		
Conservative hold		Swing		

He did not stand for parliament again. However, the following year he was elected to Leatherhead Urban District Council. He served for two three-year terms. He was also actively involved inside the Liberal Party on policy development. From 1948-49 he was Chairman of the Liberal Party Commission on Trade Unions. From 1951-53 he was a member of the Liberal Party Committee.

== Professional career ==
Cairns was chairman of the Monopolies and Restrictive Practices Commission. He was Lord Justice of Appeal from 1970-77. He presided over a number of notable enquiries and cases;

- Exxon Corp v Exxon Insurance Consultants International Ltd
- Re Gray's Inn Construction Co Ltd
- 1953 Nutts Corner BEA Vickers Viking accident
- Stonegate Securities Ltd v Gregory
- Nethermere (St Neots) Ltd v Gardiner
