= Denys Buckley =

English barrister and judge

The Right Honourable Sir Denys Buckley MBE
- Photographed by Godfrey Argent, 1970

High Court Judge
- In office 11 January 1960 – 8 June 1970
- Monarch: Elizabeth II

Lord Justice of Appeal
- In office 8 June 1970 – 6 February 1981
- Monarch: Elizabeth II

Personal details
- Born: 6 February 1906 Kensington, London, England
- Died: 13 September 1998 (aged 92) Wandsworth, London, England
- Spouse: Gwendolen Jane Armstrong-Jones
- Relations: Henry Buckley, 1st Baron Wrenbury (father)
- Children: 3
- Education: Trinity College, Oxford
- Occupation: Judge
- Profession: Barrister

Sir Denys Burton Buckley, MBE (6 February 1906 – 13 September 1998) was an English barrister and judge, rising to become a Lord Justice of Appeal.

== Personal life ==
Denys Burton Buckley was born in Kensington, the son of Henry Burton Buckley, 1st Baron Wrenbury and Bertha Margaretta Jones. He was educated at Eton College and Trinity College, Oxford. He married Gwendolen Jane Armstrong-Jones (1905–1985), daughter of Sir Robert Armstrong-Jones and aunt of the Earl of Snowdon, on 23 July 1932. They had three daughters.

During World War II, he served as a Major in the RAOC and GSO Directorate, Signals War Office, in respect of which he was awarded the US Medal of Freedom.

== Career ==
He was called as a barrister Lincoln's Inn and practised from 11 Old Square, now Radcliffe Chambers. He was appointed as a Bencher in 1949, his arms were placed in the Hall in 1960, and he served as Treasurer in 1969. He was appointed as a High Court Judge in 1960 in the Chancery Division, and received the customary knighthood. From 1962 to 1970 he served in the Restrictive Practices Court, and was appointed President in 1968. In 1970 he was elevated to the Court of Appeal and was appointed a Privy Councillor. He served as a member of the Law Reform Committee from 1963 to 1973.

== Notable cases ==
- Stonegate Securities Ltd v Gregory [1980] Ch 576
- Mascall v Mascall
- Hart v O'Connor
- Hogg v Cramphorn Ltd
- Re Gray's Inn Construction Co Ltd
- Secretary of State for Employment v Associated Society of Locomotive Engineers and Firemen (No 2)
- Wallersteiner v Moir
- Borden (UK) Ltd v Scottish Timber Products Ltd

== Death ==
He died on 13 September 1998, aged 92.

== Arms ==
Coat of arms of Denys Buckley
Notes Son of Henry Buckley, 1st Baron Wrenbury Crest On a mount Vert a demi-stag at gaze Gules attired and gorged with a collar a chain attached reflexed over the back Or supporting a garb of the last. Escutcheon Azure a chevron cottised between two stags' heads cabossed in chief and a garb in base all Or on a chief engrailed Ermine a buckle between two crosses pattée fitchée Gules. Supporters On either side a buck at gaze Gules collared attired and chained Or. Motto To My Utmost
