= Ready Mixed Concrete (South East) Ltd v Minister of Pensions and National Insurance =

Ready Mixed Concrete Ltd v Minister of Pensions
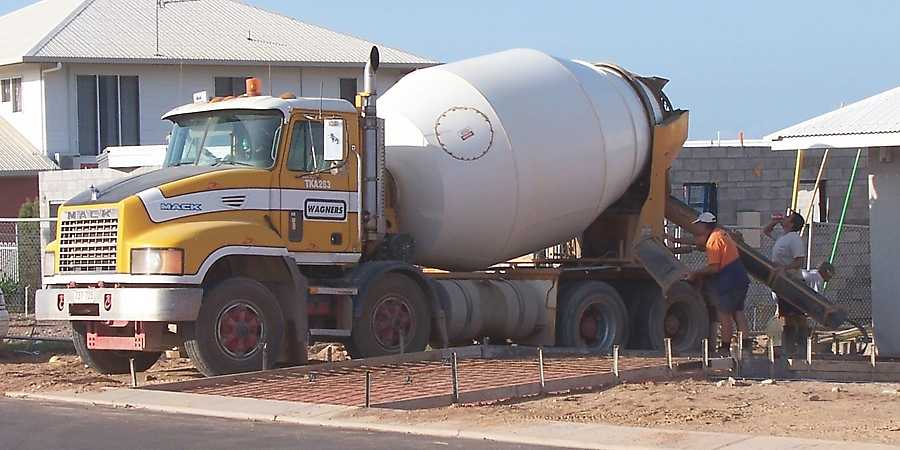
- Court: High Court of Justice
- Citation: [1968] 2 QB 497

Case opinions
- MacKenna J

Keywords
- Employee, national insurance

Ready Mixed Concrete (South East) Ltd v Minister of Pensions and National Insurance [1968] 2 QB 497 is a UK labour law case concerning the definition of a contract of service, rather than a contract for services. The distinction is important because many employment law rights under the Employment Rights Act 1996 require that a claimant has "employee" status under s 230. An employee is defined as someone with a contract of employment, and that is defined to be a contract of service (or apprenticeship). This is a leading case.

A senior UK judge has stated that employment status is a matter of law. This statement needs to be understood as clarifying that the parties to a contract do not have the clear power to define and agree (in a contract) that the contract is either employment, or not-employment. This decision, where in dispute, is a matter for the courts.

== Facts ==
Thomas Latimer had worked for Ready Mixed Concrete Ltd as a yard batcher from 1959 to 1963. The company delivered concrete, but had a policy of hiring independent contractor businesses to do the haulage because according to their policy documents, this allows

"speedy and efficient cartage, the maintenance of trucks in good condition, and the careful driving thereof, and would benefit the owner-driver by giving him an incentive to work for a higher return without abusing the vehicle in the way which often happens if an employee is given a bonus scheme related to the use of his employer's vehicle."

However they had become dissatisfied with their contractors and had started offering the jobs to current staff, with a set-up for hire-purchase for people to buy their own Leyland lorries (through a related company called "Ready Mixed Finance Ltd"). Latimer took up this chance. He went into the hire purchase to buy his own lorry, and was under a contract to haul concrete for the company. Latimer's contract described him as an "independent contractor" and he paid all the lorry running costs. But he had to put the company colours on his truck. He also had to wear a company uniform while he was working. He could only use the lorry for Ready Mixed purposes. His remuneration was calculated on mileage and load. The question about whether he was an "employee" or an independent contractor arose because the company was not paying national insurance contributions on his behalf under the National Insurance Act 1965. If he was self-employed they did not need to, but if he was an employee they did.

The Minister had found that Latimer was employed under a contract of service. The case went to the High Court and MacKenna J disagreed, saying that Latimer was a 'small business man' so working under contract for services.

== Judgment ==
MacKenna J held that on the facts, Latimer was not an employee, but rather 'a small business man'. He considered case law from around the world on the matter, including Queensland Stations Pty Ltd v. Federal Commissioners of Taxation 70 C.L.R. 539, Montreal Locomotive Works Ltd v. Montreal and Attorney General of Canada [1947] 1 D.L.R. 161 and United States v. Silk 331 U.S. 704 US Ct. The most important part of the judgment is as follows.

"I must now consider what is meant by a contract of service.

A contract of service exists if these three conditions are fulfilled. (i) The servant agrees that, in consideration of a wage or other remuneration, he will provide his own work and skill in the performance of some service for his master. (ii) He agrees, expressly or impliedly, that in the performance of that service he will be subject to the other's control in a sufficient degree to make that other master. (iii) The other provisions of the contract are consistent with its being a contract of service.

I need say little about (i) and (ii).

As to (i). There must be a wage or other remuneration. Otherwise there will be no consideration, and without consideration no contract of any kind. The servant must be obliged to provide his own work and skill. Freedom to do a job either by one's own hands or by another's is inconsistent with a contract of service, though a limited or occasional power of delegation may not be: see Atiyah's Vicarious Liability in the Law of Torts (1967) pp. 59 to 61 and the cases cited by him.

As to (ii). Control includes the power of deciding the thing to be done, the way in which it shall be done, the means to be employed in doing it, the time when and the place where it shall be done. All these aspects of control must be considered in deciding whether the right exists in a sufficient degree to make one party the master and the other his servant. The right need not be unrestricted.

"What matters is lawful authority to command so far as there is scope for it. and there must always be some room for it, if only in incidental or collateral matters." - Zuijs v. Wirth Brothers Proprietary, Ltd. (1955) 93 C.L.R. 561, 571

To find where the right resides one must look first to the express terms of the contract, and if they deal fully with the matter one may look no further. If the contract does not expressly provide which party shall have the right, the question must be answered in the ordinary way by implication.

The third and negative condition is for my purpose the important one, and I shall try with the help of five examples to explain what I mean by provisions inconsistent with the nature of a contract of service.

(i) A contract obliges one party to build for the other, providing at his own expense the necessary plant and materials. This is not a contract of service, even though the builder may be obliged to use his own labour only and to accept a high degree of control: it is a building contract. It is not a contract to serve another for a wage, but a contract to produce a thing (or a result) for a price.

(ii) A contract obliges one party to carry another's goods, providing at his own expense everything needed for performance. This is not a contract of service, even though the carrier may be obliged to drive the vehicle himself and to accept the other's control over his performance: it is a contract of carriage.

(iii) A contract obliges a labourer to work for a builder, providing some simple tools, and to accept the builder's control. Notwithstanding the obligation to provide the tools, the contract is one of service. That obligation is not inconsistent with the nature of a contract of service. It is not a sufficiently important matter to affect the substance of the contract.

(iv) A contract obliges one party to work for the other, accepting his control, and to provide his own transport. This is still a contract of service. The obligation to provide his own transport does not affect the substance. Transport in this example is incidental to the main purpose of the contract. Transport in the second example was the essential part of the performance.

(v) The same instrument provides that one party shall work for the other subject to the other's control, and also that he shall sell him his land. The first part of the instrument is no less a contract of service because the second part imposes obligations of a different kind: Amalgamated Engineering Union v. Minister of Pensions and National Insurance [1963] 1 W.L.R. 441, 451, 452; [1963] 1 All E.R. 864.

I can put the point which I am making in other words. An obligation to do work subject to the other party's control is a necessary, though not always a sufficient, condition of a contract of service. If the provisions of the contract as a whole are inconsistent with its being a contract of service, it will be some other kind of contract, and the person doing the work will not be a servant. The judge's task is to classify the contract (a task like that of distinguishing a contract of sale from one of work and labour). He may, in performing it, take into account other matters besides control."

== See also ==
- British labour law
- Nethermere (St. Neots) Ltd. v. Gardiner And Another [1984] ICR 612
