= Exxon Corp v Exxon Insurance Consultants International Ltd =

Exxon Corp. v. Exxon Insurance Consultants International Ltd
- Court: Court of Appeal (Civil Division)
- Full case name: Exxon Corporation and Exxon Insurance Consultants International Limited
- Decided: 12 June 1981
- Citations: [1982] Ch. 119 [1981] 3 All E.R. 241 [1982] R.P.C. 69 (1981) 125 S.J. 527; Times, June 13, 1981
- Cases cited: DP Anderson & Co Ltd v Lieber Code Co, [1917] 2 K.B. 469 (KBD); Hollinrake v Truswell, [1894] 3 Ch. 420 (CA)
- Legislation cited: Companies Act 1948 s.18 Companies Act 1948 s.18(1); Copyright Act 1956 s.1 Copyright Act 1956 s.2 Copyright Act 1956 s.2(1); Copyright Act 1956 s.6 Copyright Act 1956 s.17 Copyright Act 1956 s.48 Copyright Act 1911 s.1 Copyright Act 1911 s.1(1); Copyright Act 1911 s.35 Copyright Act 1842; Trade Marks Act 1938 s.9 Trade Marks Act 1938 s.9(1)(c); Trade Marks Act 1919; Rules of the Supreme Court Ord.19; Rules Supreme Court Ord.19 r.7 Rules of the Supreme Court r.7

Case history
- Prior actions: Exxon Corp v Exxon Insurance Consultants International Ltd, [1981] 1 W.L.R. 624 [1981] 2 All E.R. 495 [1981] F.S.R. 238 (1981) 125 S.J. 342 (Ch D)
- Subsequent action: None

Court membership
- Judges sitting: Stephenson, L.J. Oliver, L.J. Sir David Cairns

Keywords
- Literary works, Trade names

Exxon Corp. v. Exxon Insurance Consultants International Ltd [1982] Ch. 119 is a leading decision in English law on the existence of copyright in a name alone and the infringement of a trade mark. The court found that typically there is no copyright in a name, invented or otherwise, and that a trade mark can only be infringed when the infringing party shares part of the market segment.

The plaintiff, Exxon Corp, had claimed the copyright of the word and went on to file an injunction to stop the defendant company from using the word 'Exxon', under Exxon's copyright claim to its own name under English copyright law, protecting 'original literary works' and further asked the defendant company to remove the word from the company name. However, Judge Oliver decided to not grant the injunction to an infringement of copyright and noted that the word did not qualify for copyright protection as an ′original literary work′. This is because it conveyed no information, provides no instruction nor pleasure and is furthermore merely a combination of letters from the alphabet.

Judge Graham quoted '"if the plaintiffs' argument is right .... the consequences would be far-reaching and probably in many cases objectionable'. On appeal it was further emphasised by Lord Justice Stephenson that 'I am not sure whether this ["Exxon"] can be said to be a "work" at all; I am clearly of the opinion that it cannot be said to be a 'literary work'.

== Trade mark ==
With regard to the trade mark, the court found that the use of this word by the defendants, who work in a field that in no way shares a market segment with the plaintiff, in no way dilutes the plaintiff's brand name nor infringes on its trade mark.
