= Coutts & Co v Stock =

UK insolvency law case

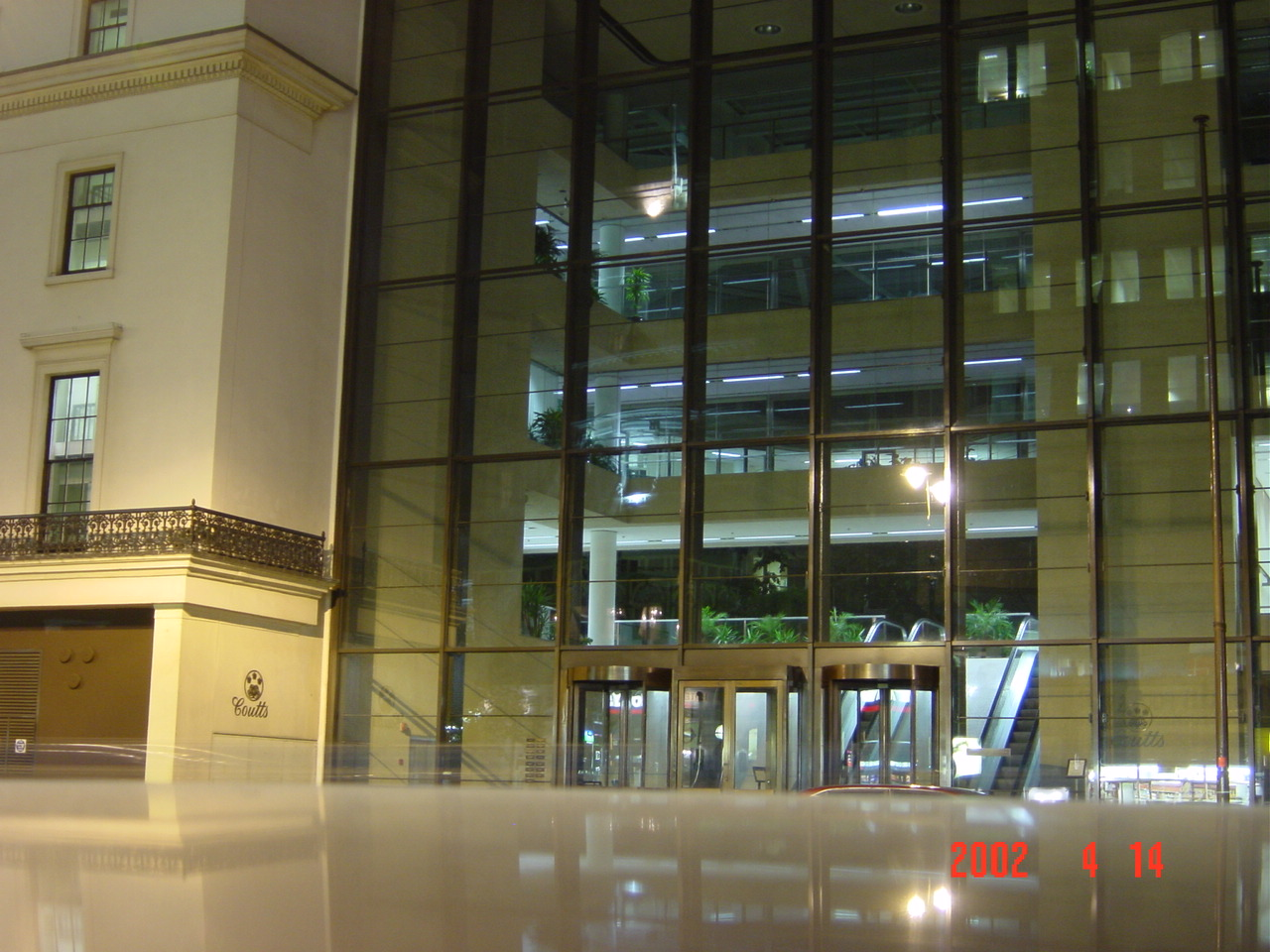
- Court: High Court of Justice
- Decided: 24 November 1999
- Citations: [1999] EWHC Ch 191 [2000] 1 WLR 906

Keywords
- Insolvency, voidable transaction

Coutts & Co v Stock [1999] EWHC 191 (Ch), [2000] 1 WLR 906 is a UK insolvency law case, concerning voidable transactions.

== Facts ==
Coutts & Co gave Mr Stock’s company a £200,000 overdraft. Mr Stock gave a personal guarantee for it. Then came a winding up petition, as the account was £500 in credit. But by the time the petition was advertised, the account was overdrawn by £121,875 and £190,000 by the time the petition was granted. The bank honoured cheques in favour of third parties, most of which were three companies controlled by Mr Stock. Coutts & Co wanted to enforce the guarantee. Mr Stock argued the Insolvency Act 1986's section 127 (Note: Since 15 October 2003, known as s. 127(1): "In a winding up by the court any disposition of the company's property and any transfer of shares or alteration in the status of the company's members made after the commencement of the winding up is, unless the court otherwise orders, void.") prevented the bank from debiting the account, and so the bank could not recover from him.

== Judgment ==
The Bank was held to be entitled to the full sum claimed, as it was a debt owed by the Debtor.

Lightman J noted that "[t]he authorities are in disarray and the state of the law is uncertain, if not confused." He then proceeded to identify "the principles which would be expected to operate in a case where Section 127 applies":

1. The invalidation of dispositions of a company's assets after the date of presentation of a winding up petition is part of the statutory scheme designed to prevent the directors of a company, when liquidation is imminent, from disposing of the company's assets to the prejudice of its creditors and to preserve those assets for the benefit of the general body of creditors.
2. The retrospective invalidation effected by Section 127 does not change what happened between the date of the petition and the date of the winding up order
3. The invalidation is limited to dispositions of property: it does not invalidate a company's assumption of liabilities, and it has no impact on the company's use, consumption or exhaustion of its assets.
4. Presentation of the winding up petition has no impact on the powers of the directors of the company, the authority of the company's agents or the powers of disposition of the company.
5. If the acts of the bank of honouring cheques drawn on a company's overdrawn account constitute payments by the bank (by way of loan to the company) of its own monies to the party in whose favour the cheques are drawn, the transaction is outside Section 127, for there is no disposition of the company's property.
6. The acts of the bank in honouring cheques drawn on a company's overdrawn account constitute (i) loans of the sums in question by the bank to the company and (ii) payment by the bank as agent of the company of the sums loaned as monies of the company to the party in whose favour the cheques are drawn. The first act is not a disposition of the company's money and is therefore outside Section 127; but the second act does constitute a disposition to the payee by the company within Section 127 and is recoverable by the liquidator from the payee. (Note: citing Millett J in Agip (Africa) Ltd v Jackson [1990] EWCA Civ 2, [1990] Ch 265 (21 December 1990) at 283 and 292 A-B)

== See also ==
- UK insolvency law
