= Dunnachie v Kingston-upon-Hull City Council =

- Court: House of Lords
- Citation: [2004] UKHL 36

Keywords
- Unfair dismissal

Dunnachie v Kingston-upon-Hull City Council [2004] UKHL 36 is a UK labour law case, concerning unfair dismissal.

== Facts ==
Mr Dunnachie had been employed by Kingston-upon-Hull City Council since 1986 when he was 19. He resigned in March 2001 after a prolonged campaign of harassment by a colleague and line manager. An employment tribunal upheld his complaint of unfair dismissal and made a compensatory award, under section 123 of the Employment Rights Act 1996. This included a sum of £10,000 for the distress suffered for the manner of his dismissal. The employer successfully appealed to the Employment Appeal Tribunal on the ground that the employment tribunal had had no jurisdiction to make an award of compensation for non-economic loss on a complaint of unfair dismissal. The Court of Appeal held that the word "loss" in section 123(1) of the Employment Rights Act 1996 on its true construction did not include non-pecuniary loss.

== Judgment ==
Lord Steyn held that one must focus solely on "economic losses".
