= Peter Bristow =

British barrister and High Court judge

Sir Peter Henry Rowley Bristow (1 June 1913 – 1 August 2002) was a British barrister and judge. He was a High Court judge from 1970 to 1985, sitting in the Queen's Bench Division.
