= Bank of Ireland v Hollicourt (Contracts) Ltd =

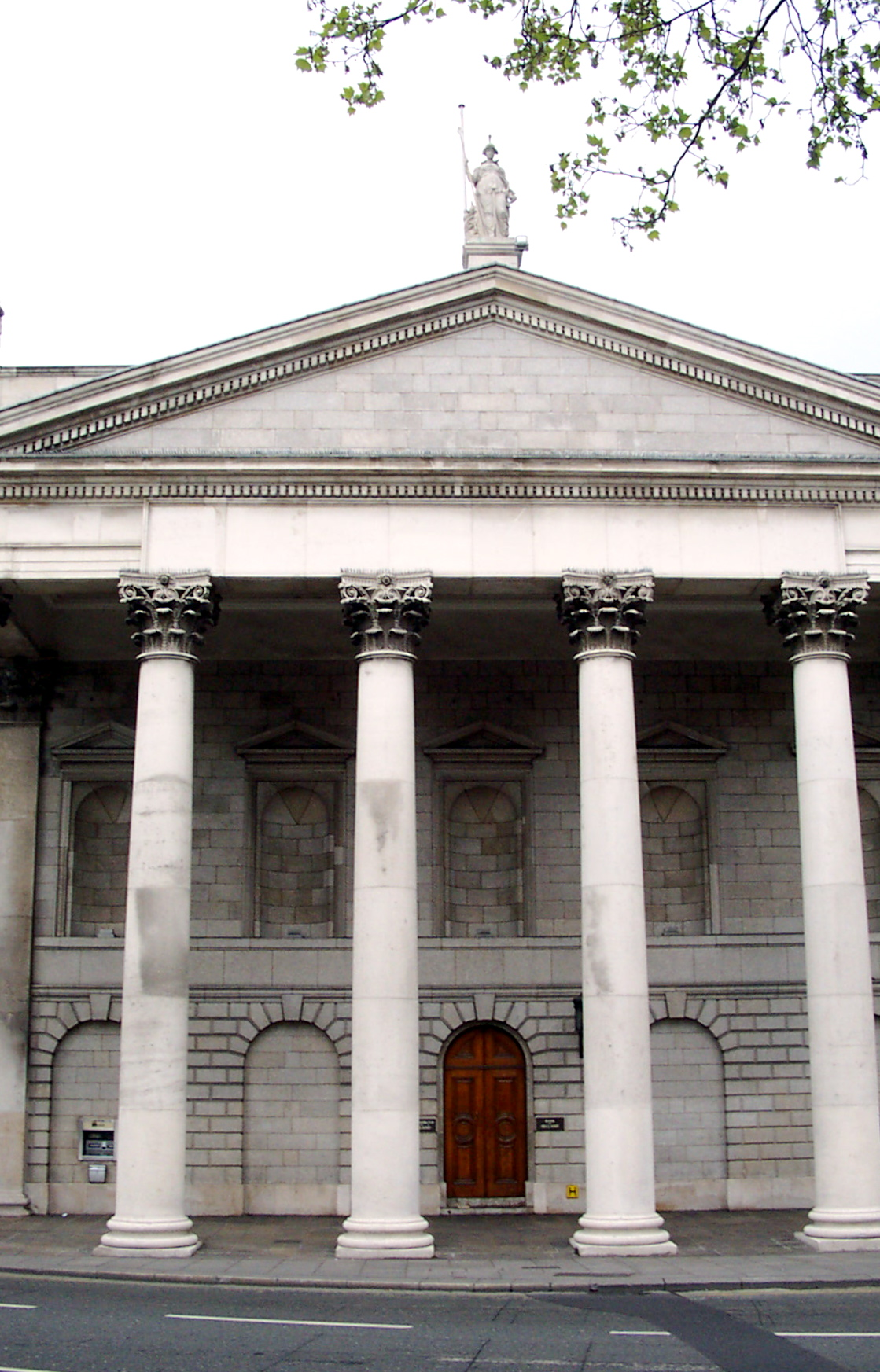
- Court: Court of Appeal
- Citations: [2000] EWCA Civ 263, [2001] Ch 555, [2001] 1 BCLC 233

Court membership
- Judges sitting: Mummery LJ, Peter Gibson LJ, Latham LJ

Case opinions
- Mummery LJ

Bank of Ireland v Hollicourt (Contracts) Ltd [2000] EWCA Civ 263 is a UK insolvency law case concerning whether a bank should pay restitution for moneys paid out of its account after a moratorium under the Insolvency Act 1986 section 127.

== Facts ==
Hollicourt was a construction company and it went insolvent in 1996. The Bank of Ireland, 31 King Street, Leeds, continued to operate its account, paying money in and out, for three months after because it missed (through human error) the notification of the winding up petition in the Gazette.

Blackburne J, applying dicta from Gray's Inn, held that the bank was liable to pay restitution for the money that had passed through its facility.

== Judgment ==
Mummery LJ for the court (Peter Gibson LJ and Latham LJ) held that Blackburne J was wrong. Only the final recipients, not the bank, were liable to repay the money. There was no unjust enrichment on the bank's part, and no comparable restitution case could be found. The banking transactions 'are merely part of the process by which dispositions of the company's property are made.'

From the perspective of company liquidators this decision will be unwelcome. The third parties that benefit from the dispositions are generally diffuse and difficult to trace. Banks, on the other hand, were a readily identifiable target to proceed against and will no doubt now be breathing a sign [sic] of relief.

So property could be recovered from the payees only, but not the bank which acted as a simple agent in the transfer.

== See also ==
- UK insolvency law
