= Carmichael v National Power plc =

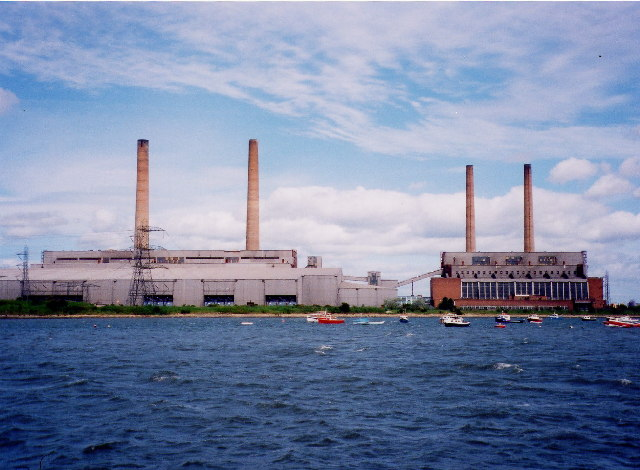
- The plaintiffs worked at Blyth Power Station.
- Court: House of Lords
- Decided: 18 November 1999
- Citations: [1999] UKHL 47, [1999] 1 WLR 2042; [1999] ICR 1226

Case opinions
- Lord Irvine LC, Lord Hoffmann

Keywords
- Employment contract, mutuality of obligation, casual worker, holiday

Carmichael v National Power plc [1999] UKHL 47 is a British labour law case on the contract of employment for the purpose of the Employment Rights Act 1996.

== Facts ==
Tour guides had complained that they hadn't received written statement of the employment contracts under s.1 of the Employment Rights Act 1996. They worked at Blyth Power Stations in Northumberland, for the Central Electricity Generating Board. Their hiring contracts said ‘I am pleased to note that you are agreeable to be employed by the C.E.G.B. at Blyth ‘A’ and ‘B’ power stations on a casual as required basis as a station guide.’

== Judgment ==
The House of Lords decided that they were not employees for the purpose of s 1, because there was not sufficient 'mutuality of obligation' when the guides were not actually guiding. Lord Irvine of Lairg said that there would not have been an ‘irreducible minimum of mutuality of obligation necessary to create a contract of service’ (relying on Nethermere) between the times actually working (while working the situation would be different). Their claim failed on the basis that on many occasions they would be called up but say they could not work.

If this appeal turned exclusively - and in my judgment it does not - on the true meaning and effect of the documentation of March 1989, then I would hold as a matter of construction that no obligation on the CEGB to provide casual work, nor on Mrs Leese and Mrs Carmichael to undertake it, was imposed. There would therefore be an absence of that irreducible minimum of mutual obligation necessary to create a contract of service (Nethermere (St Neots) Ltd v Gardiner [1984] ICR 612, 623C-G per Stephenson LJ, and Clark v Oxfordshire Health Authority [1998] IRLR 125, 128 per Sir Christopher Slade, at paragraph 22).

In my judgment it would only be appropriate to determine the issue in these cases solely by reference to the documents in March 1989, if it appeared from their own terms and/or from what the parties said or did then, or subsequently, that they intended them to constitute an exclusive memorial of their relationship. The industrial tribunal must be taken to have decided that they were not so intended but constituted one, albeit important, relevant source of material from which they were entitled to infer the parties' true intention, along with the other objective inferences which could reasonably be drawn from what the parties said and did in March 1989, and subsequently.

The documents contained no provisions governing when, how, or with what frequency guide work would be offered; there were no provisions for notice of termination on either side; the sickness, holiday and pension arrangements for regular staff did not apply; nor did the grievance and disciplinary procedures. Significantly, as Kennedy LJ in his dissenting judgment with which I agree emphasised, in 1994, for example, Mrs. Carmichael was not available for work on 17 occasions nor Mrs Leese on 8. (p. 1174D). No suggestion of disciplining them arose. The objective inference is that when work was available they were free to undertake it or not as they chose. This flexibility of approach was well suited to their family needs. Just as the need for tours was unpredictable so also were their domestic commitments. Flexibility suited both sides. As Mrs Carmichael said in her application form, "the part-time casual arrangement would suit my personal circumstances ideally!" The arrangement turned on mutual convenience and goodwill and worked well in practice over the years. The tribunal observed that Mrs. Leese and Mrs Carmichael had a sense of moral obligation to the CEGB, but would infer no legal obligation. Mr Lovatt also gave evidence for the CEGB that "neither ladies are required to work if they do not wish to do so." In my judgment, therefore, the industrial tribunal was well entitled to infer from the March 1989, documents, the surrounding circumstances and how the parties conducted themselves subsequently that their intention neither in 1989 nor subsequently was to have their relationship regulated by contract whilst Mrs Leese and Mrs Carmichael were not working as guides. The industrial tribunal correctly concluded that their case "founders on the rock of absence of mutuality." I repeat that no issue arises as to their status when actually working as guides.

Thus, even if the words, "employment will be on a casual as required basis" in the March 1989 documentation were, as Mr Langstaff QC contends, capable of imposing an obligation to undertake guide work when required - and in my judgment they are not - that interpretation is negated by the findings of the industrial tribunal. So also, even if the March 1989 documentation were capable of bearing the primary constructions which found favour with Ward LJ and Chadwick LJ - and in my judgment they are not - the terms which each implied, by invoking business efficacy may not be implied because there may be no implication on that ground unless into a relationship itself contractual.

For all these reasons I would allow this appeal and reinstate the industrial tribunal's reserved decision of 11 September 1995.

Lord Hoffmann stated, at 1233,

"…the terms of the contract are a question of fact. And of course the question of whether the parties intended a document or documents to be the exclusive record of the terms of their agreement is also a question of fact."

"The evidence of a party as to what terms he understood to have been agree is some evidence tending to show that those terms, in an objective sense, were agreed. Of course the tribunal may reject such evidence and conclude that the party misunderstood the effect of what was being said and done. But when both parties are agreed about what they understood their mutual obligations (or lack of them) to be, it is a strong thing to exclude their evidence from consideration."

== See also ==
- UK labour law
