= Haydn Tudor Evans =

British judge (1920–2012)

Sir Haydn Tudor Evans

Justice of the High Court
- In office 1974–1994

Personal details
- Born: Haydn Tudor Evans Cardiff, Wales

Sir Haydn Tudor Evans (20 June 1920 – 22 March 2012) was a British barrister and judge. Appointed to the High Court in 1974, he sat in the Family Division from 1974 to 1978 and in the Queen's Bench Division from 1978 to 1994.

== Life and career ==
Born in Cardiff, Tudor Evans was the fourth son of John Edgar Evans and Ellen (née Stringer). He was educated at Cardiff High School and Monmouth School, before winning an open scholarship to Lincoln College, Oxford. During the Second World War, he joined the Royal Naval Volunteer Reserve and trained as a pilot in the Fleet Air Arm. He was invalidated out after sustaining serious injuries during an air raid, exacerbated by an accident in hospital.

Evans then took up his place in Oxford before his recovery was complete. Graduating with honours in modern history and jurisprudence, he also won a major scholarship to Lincoln's Inn. After completing a pupillage in the chambers of Sir David Maxwell Fyfe, he obtained tenancy in the chambers of Montague Berryman, KC, in King’s Bench Walk, where he specialised in personal injury litigation. He took silk in 1962.

Tudor Evans was appointed to the High Court in 1974, receiving the usual knighthood. Assigned to the Family Division, he found the work distasteful, and was transferred to the Queen's Bench Division in 1978. He retired in 1994.
