= John Donaldson, Baron Donaldson of Lymington =

British judge (1920–2005)

The Right Honourable The Lord Donaldson of Lymington PC
- Donaldson in 1966

Member of the House of Lords
- Lord Temporal
- Life peerage 15 February 1988 – 31 August 2005

Master of the Rolls
- In office 30 July 1982 – 1 October 1992
- Monarch: Elizabeth II
- Preceded by: The Lord Denning
- Succeeded by: Sir Thomas Bingham

Lord Justice of Appeal
- In office 1979–1982

Personal details
- Born: John Francis Donaldson; 6 October 1920 London, England
- Died: 31 August 2005 (aged 84) Lymington, Hampshire, England
- Spouse: Dorothy Warwick (m. 1945; died 2003)
- Children: 3
- Education: Charterhouse School
- Alma mater: Trinity College, Cambridge
- Occupation: QC, jurist

John Francis Donaldson, Baron Donaldson of Lymington, PC (6 October 1920 – 31 August 2005) was a British barrister and judge who served as Master of the Rolls for ten years, from 1982 to 1992. He was the first (and only) President of the short-lived National Industrial Relations Court from 1971 to 1974.

== Early and private life ==
John Francis Donaldson was born in Marylebone, London, on 6 October 1920, to Malcolm (1884–1973) and Evelyn (née Gilroy) Donaldson. His father was a Harley Street-based gynaecologist.

Donaldson attended first Charterhouse and then Trinity College, Cambridge. He served as chairman of the Federation of University Conservative and Unionist Associations, and harboured ambitions of representing the Conservative Party as a Member of Parliament. He was an Independent Ratepayers Councillor for the County Borough of Croydon from 1949 to 1953.

After graduating with a lower second class degree in 1941, he joined the war effort as a commissioned officer in the Royal Signals. He then served with the Guards Armoured Divisional Signals, both domestically and in North-West Europe, until the end of the war in 1945. He served in the military government of Schleswig-Holstein, and was demobbed as a lieutenant-colonel aged 25.

He married Dorothy Mary Warwick (later known as Dame Mary Donaldson), in 1945, having met her at Middlesex Hospital where she was working as a nurse. She later became the first woman to be a Member of the City of London Court of Common Council, the first female Alderman, the first female Sheriff and, finally, in 1983, the first female Lord Mayor of London. Together, they had two daughters and a son; his wife predeceased him in October 2003.

== Legal career ==
Donaldson was called to the Bar in 1946 as a Harmsworth Scholar at the Middle Temple. He joined the chambers of Sir Henry Willink, QC at 3 Essex Court and built a successful tort and commercial practice. He was made a Queen's Counsel in 1961, and became a High Court judge when he was appointed to the Queen's Bench Division and knighted in 1966 at the age of 45. He remained the youngest High Court judge for a number of years.

He became the first (and last) President of the National Industrial Relations Court (NIRC, also known as the Industrial Relations Tribunal) from its formation by Ted Heath's Conservative government in 1971 under the Industrial Relations Act 1971 until it was abolished in 1974. The trades unions, pointing to his Tory inclinations in his youth, nicknamed him "Black Jack", and 181 Members of Parliament (MPs) signed a House of Commons motion calling for his dismissal.

Two months after Margaret Thatcher was elected in 1979, he became a Lord Justice of Appeal and was sworn of the Privy Council. He replaced Lord Denning as Master of the Rolls in 1982, becoming the presiding officer of the civil division of the Court of Appeal, where he pushed forward modernisation efforts, including the introduction of skeleton arguments in civil appeals, judgments being "handed down" rather than read, and enhanced case management.

Donaldson decided in O'Kelly v. Trusthouse Forte plc [1983] ICR 728, Donaldson's early reforms would later be overtaken by the Civil Procedure Rules introduced by a later Master of the Rolls, Lord Woolf. On 15 February 1988 he was elevated to the House of Lords as a life peer as Baron Donaldson of Lymington, of Lymington in the County of Hampshire.

In his various roles, Donaldson was involved in many high-profile cases from the 1970s onwards. He presided over the trials of the Guildford Four in 1975 and the Maguire Seven in 1976, and was later criticised in Sir John May's interim report of his inquiry into the miscarriages of justice. The inquiry by Sir John May into the injustice suffered by the Maguires said that Mr Justice Donaldson, as he was then, had failed to appreciate that the sudden emergence of new evidence on the last day of the trial removed the whole basis of the prosecution case. He also allowed inadmissible evidence to be presented to the jury, the report added. At the trials, he achieved notoriety for declaring in his closing remarks that he wished the men had been indicted for high treason, which still carried the death penalty, rather than for murder, which by then no longer carried the death penalty. These remarks bore an uncanny resemblance to the words of another leading judge of the era, Sir Nigel Bridge, who commented in a similar IRA-based miscarriage of justice, the Birmingham Six trial, that he wished that he could still hang murderers.

Donaldson refused to prevent newspapers from publishing the Spycatcher memoir of Peter Wright in 1988, against government policy; and he ruled in 1991 that the then Home Secretary, Kenneth Baker was in contempt of court over an extradition case, in which a man was deported to Zaire while the case was still pending, contrary to a court order.

== In retirement ==
After retiring as a judge in 1992, he wrote reports regarding two maritime accidents involving the grounding of oil tankers and subsequent spills of crude oil: the grounding of the MV Braer off the Shetland Islands in January 1993, in which 85,000 tonnes of oil escaped; and the grounding of the Sea Empress at the entrance to Milford Haven in February 1996, and subsequent escape of more than 70,000 tonnes of oil off the Pembrokeshire coast.

In the 2000-01 session of Parliament, he presented a private member's bill in the House of Lords (the Parliament Acts (Amendment) Bill), which would have had the effect of confirming the legitimacy of the Parliament Act 1949 to address concerns raised by legal academics as to whether the use of the Act was valid. The bill was not passed, and Donaldson supported the legal action by the Countryside Alliance to overturn the Hunting Act 2004, which was passed under the provisions of the Parliament Acts 1911 and 1949.

Donaldson died from a heart attack at his home in Lymington on 31 August 2005.

== Judgments ==
- The Angel Bell [1979] 2 Lloyd's Rep 491
- Parker v British Airways Board [1982] Q.B. 1004
- Ronex Properties Ltd v John Laing Construction Ltd [1983] Q.B. 398
- Re T (Adult: Refusal of Treatment)] [1993] Fam. 95
- O'Kelly v Trusthouse Forte plc [1983] ICR 728

== Arms ==
Coat of arms of John Donaldson, Baron Donaldson of Lymington

Crest
A Sealion erect Sable Scales Fins and Tail Or holding a Lymphad also Or the Mainsail displaying the Arms, viz. Sable two Bars Or in chief three Petasi Argent winged Gold each mast ensigned by a Cross Formy Gules
Escutcheon
Sable two Bars Or in chief three Petasi argent winged Gold
Motto
Pro Libertate Per Leges (For liberty through the Law)

Legal offices
Preceded by The Lord Denning	Master of the Rolls; 1982–1992	Succeeded by Sir Thomas Bingham
