= Specialist schools in the United Kingdom =

UK school that specialises in certain subject areas

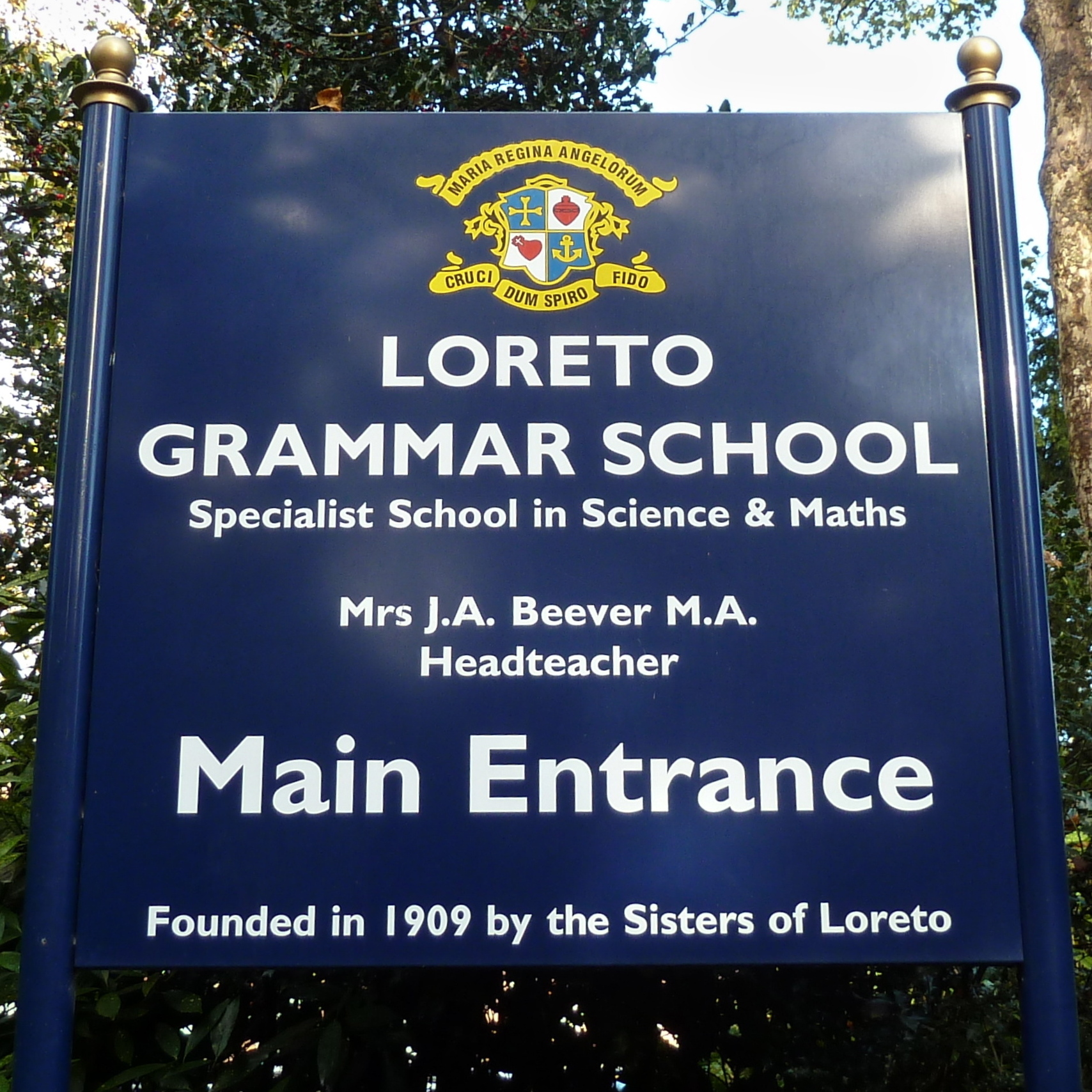
A sign for Loreto Grammar School in Altrincham with its specialist status in maths and science advertised.

Specialist schools (Note: Also known as specialist subject schools, specialist status schools and specialised schools.) in the United Kingdom (sometimes branded as specialist colleges in England and Northern Ireland) are schools with an emphasis or focus in a specific specialised subject area, which is called a specialism, or alternatively in the case of some special schools in England, in a specific area of special educational need. They intend to act as centres of excellence in their specialism and, in some circumstances, may select pupils for their aptitude in it. Though they focus on their specialism, specialist schools still teach the full curriculum. Therefore, as opposed to being a significant move away from it, the specialism is viewed as enriching the original curricular offer of the school.

Devolution has led to different policies and concepts around specialist schools in each of the four constituent countries of the United Kingdom. In England, a near-universal specialist system of secondary education has been established, with the majority of secondary schools (3,000 or 90%) specialising in one or more subjects as of 2019, while in Wales and Scotland a comprehensive system has been retained, with no specialist schools in Wales and few specialist schools in Scotland. There were 12 specialist schools in Northern Ireland as of 2015.

From 1993 (2006 in Northern Ireland) to 2011, specialist schools in England and Northern Ireland were granted additional government funding through the specialist schools programme. This programme limited the specialisms available to schools unless they had academy status, which is exclusive to England, and required them to raise money in private sector sponsorship before specialising. Since its discontinuation in 2011, the requirement of sponsorship and limitations on specialism have been lifted, but schools no longer gain extra funding for being a specialist school in those countries. In Scotland, specialist schools are directly funded by the government, unlike other schools which are funded by their local authority.

== Definitions ==
In 1998, Tony Edwards of the RISE Trust said that, in the United Kingdom, a specialist school could "simply be the neighbourhood school which has decided to emphasise a curriculum strength". In 2007, Sean Coughlan of BBC News defined specialist schools as state schools which "specialise in one or more subject areas", while Alexandra Smith of The Guardian defined them as "[s]chools that focus on a particular subject area". Channel 4 News used a similar definition to Smith's in 2010. (Note: Smith's definition restricted the subject area to one of the specialisms offered to schools in the specialist schools programme, while Channel 4 News' definition did not.) The 2015 UK-based Oxford Dictionary of Education defines a specialist school as "[a] secondary school which specializes in the teaching of a particular area of the curriculum", (Note: There were government pilot programmes for specialist primary schools in the late 2000s and early 2010s, and more primary schools have specialised since then. There have also been specialist middle schools, all-through schools and sixth form colleges.) while the sixth edition of Essential Public Affairs for Journalists, an Oxford University publication from 2019, concludes that specialist school is "a catch-all term embracing each and every school with a specialism" and not a particular category of school. A specialism is a specialist school's chosen subject area of focus.

=== Specialist colleges ===
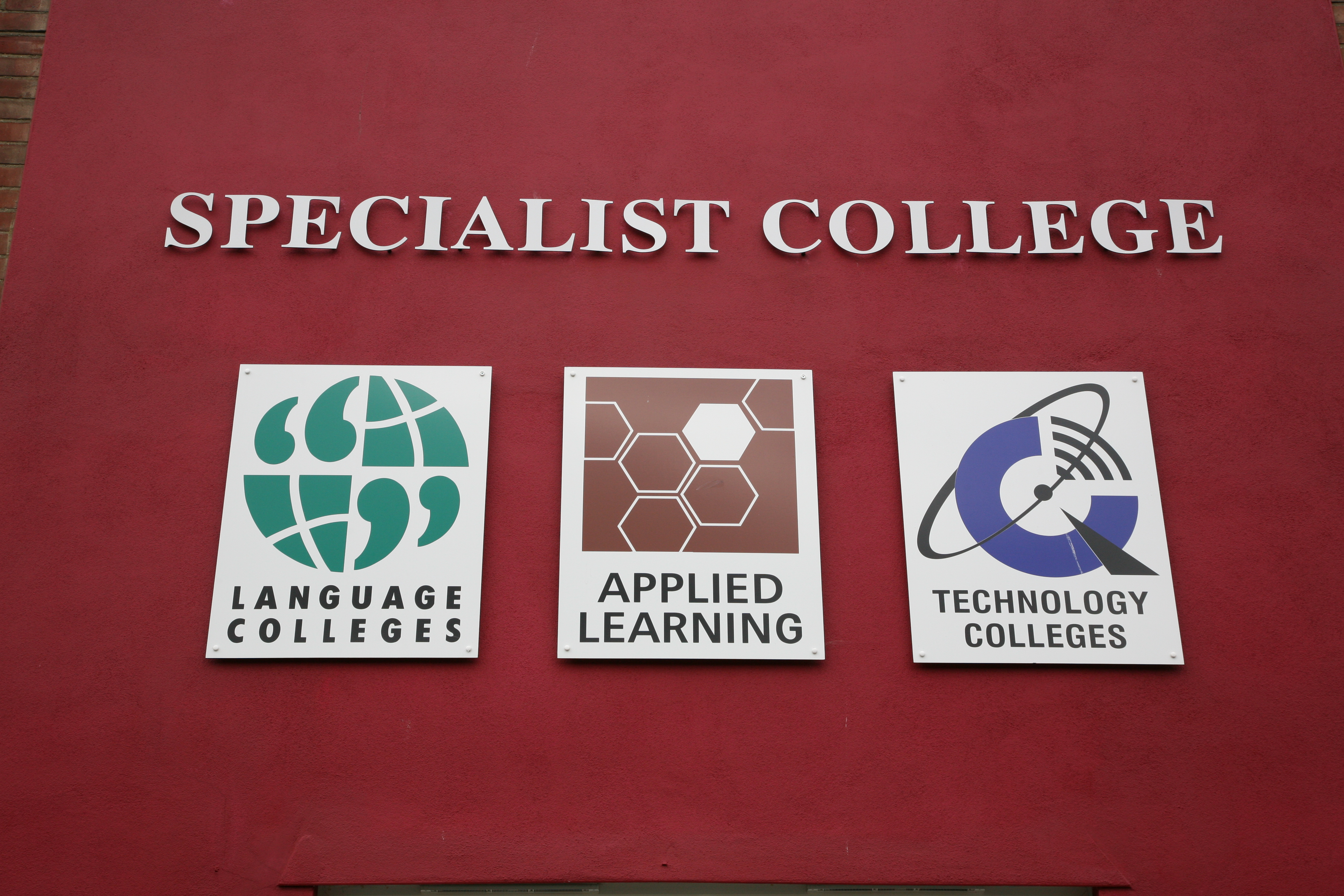
The specialist college branding at St Bonaventure's in Newham, London. Its designated specialisms in language, applied learning and technology are displayed below.

Schools that gained specialist school status in the specialist schools programme could accordingly rebrand themselves as specialist schools or, alternatively, as specialist colleges. The specialist college branding was seen as a label of prestige. There were 2,000 of these specialist colleges in the United Kingdom in 2005. In the context of education after the age of 16, the term specialist college refers to institutions of further education that focus on one course or subject rather than the usual wide selection of courses. Unlike sixth form colleges with specialist school status, which still teach their specialised subject within a broader curriculum, these specialist colleges are completely based around their specialism, and their facilities and staff's specialist subject knowledge challenge those of normal schools.

=== Special schools ===
Although they may be confused with each other, specialist schools have no relation to special schools. Special schools specialise in teaching special needs children rather than specific subject areas, but have been allowed to gain specialist school status since the 2000s, and many of them took an interest in possibly rebranding themselves as specialist colleges through the specialist schools programme.

Some special schools in England are now specialist schools for a specific area of special educational need. There are four possible areas to specialise in: communication and interaction, cognition and learning, social, emotional and mental health, and sensory and physical needs. To specialise in one of these areas, special schools must have pupils aged 11 and above. They cannot specialise in more than one of these areas, but can further specialise within an area to reflect the special needs they help with, for example in autistic spectrum disorders or in visual impairment.

== In the independent sector ==
In the private sector of education, there are specialist schools for the performing arts such as theatre and stage schools. There were 11 specialist theatre schools in the United Kingdom in 2014, with most of these being in London or its surrounding areas. In 2015, none of these schools were in Scotland, Wales and Northern Ireland, and neither were there any in the North East and South West of England, so most pupils had to relocate if they wished to attend one. There are also specialist preparatory schools in England.

=== Music and Dance scheme ===
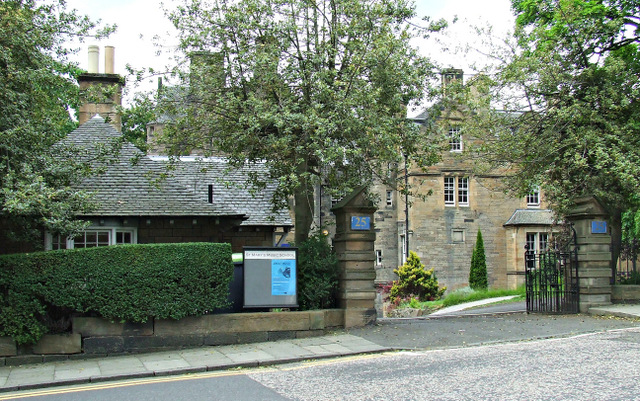
St Mary's Music School in Edinburgh was one of the five schools designated with specialist status in music in 1985. It remained a member of the MDS scheme until c. 2022.

In 1965, a report called Making Musicians was commissioned by the Calouste Gulbenkian Foundation. The report, which was chaired by Gilmour Jenkins, recommended the creation of new "special music schools at primary and secondary level". Following the report, four specialist independent schools for music were established, in addition to the one that was already open. In 1973 two of the five specialist schools, the Yehudi Menuhin School and the Royal Ballet Lower School, were designated as centres of excellence for the performing arts. Designation brought with it a direct grant from the Department of Education and Science and admittance into a scheme that introduced a means-test for parents similar to the one seen in the scheme for direct grant grammar schools.

A second report entitled Training Musicians was commissioned by the foundation in 1978. This report evaluated the state of specialist music education and recommended "that exceptionally talented young musicians and dancers should have access to elite education, regardless of their financial circumstances". This led to the creation of the government's Music and Ballet Schools scheme (MBS) in 1982. The scheme designated five independent schools across England and Scotland (Note: These schools were Yehudi Menuhin School, Wells Cathedral School, Purcell School, Chetham's School of Music and St Mary's Music School.) with specialist school status in music, and gave them and the Royal Ballet School assisted places. This meant that children who passed one of their entrance examinations (the schools are selective in music) could be enrolled to them without needing to pay fees, provided that their parents passed a means-test and were on low-income. Families with a higher income still had to pay fees, although the government would pay toward some of the costs. The scheme was renamed the Music and Dance scheme (MDS) in 2002. Eight independent schools, including four music schools and four dance schools, along with 12 music centres and ten dance centres were participating in the scheme as of September 2022.

== In the state sector ==
=== Early years: 1986–1997 ===
==== City technology colleges and technology schools ====
In the state sector of education, specialist schools have their origin in the city technology college programme of the late 1980s, which was used by the Conservative government of the time to reduce the power of local authorities. The programme was announced at the 1986 Conservative Party Conference by Education Secretary Kenneth Baker, with plans for the creation of a pilot network of 20 new city technology colleges (CTCs) by 1990 being revealed. These new schools would be secondary schools with a curricular emphasis on science and technology. They would be funded jointly by the central government and industrial sponsors, who would have significant influence in the management of the schools, and controlled by educational trusts instead of the local education authorities (LEAs) which had funded and controlled all state schools up to this point.

In 1987 the City Technology Colleges Trust, made to oversee the establishment of CTCs, was established. It was chaired by Cyril Taylor, a businessman and philanthropist whose proposal for the creation of 100 technical and technological schools to reduce rising levels of youth unemployment in January 1986 led to the creation of the CTC programme. Baker and Prime Minister Margaret Thatcher tasked Taylor with overseeing the establishment of the CTCs and he had founded the trust at their request. It was responsible for finding the sites for the new schools and raising industrial money for their buildings, and all CTCs would become members of it. Taylor was also recruited by Baker as his special adviser on CTCs and specialist schools, a role he would maintain under ten consecutive education secretaries from both major political parties until 2007. The first CTCs opened the following year through the Education Reform Act 1988. These were the first specialist schools in the state sector. Their establishment marked the first phase of the specialist schools policy in England, with the government intending to introduce "relevant" subjects, primarily technology, to the general curriculum.

From 1990, the new prime minister John Major was under increasing pressure to come up with a "more Treasury-friendly" concept for specialist schools. The cost of each CTC in public money was unexpectedly high; their buildings had to be built from the ground up as LEAs refused to provide disused school buildings, which had significantly increased the cost of the programme. The government looked for an alternative way to create more specialist schools for technology and science. Its first solution was the creation of the technology schools initiative (TSI) in 1991. Through this initiative, the government would reward secondary schools with a one-time capital grant for specialising in technology, though these schools still had to follow the National Curriculum. LEAs in England and later Wales could nominate one or two of their schools for the grant while grant-maintained schools and voluntary aided schools, which were largely independent of local authority control, could apply to the initiative separately. Overall, 222 schools in England and 27 schools in Wales benefited from the extra funding.

The idea of turning existing secondary schools into specialist schools for technology came from Cyril Taylor, who had proposed it in response to the government's inability to pay for the implementation of technology as a compulsory subject in all schools, which had been enforced by the Education Reform Act 1988. Taylor argued that this would allow the government to gradually pay for the subject over a long period of time, and that it would also salvage the failures of the CTC programme. Nevertheless, the programme had to be discontinued in 1993 because of the increasing economic pressures caused by Black Wednesday. Overall, fifteen CTCs were established in England while none were established in Wales. Three of these remain open in the present day, with the rest becoming academy schools in the 2000s.

==== Technology colleges and the Education Act 1993 ====
As the TSI came to an end in 1993 and 1994, the government moved toward establishing new technology colleges. Also proposed by Taylor, these schools would be created from existing secondary schools and would specialise in technology, maths and science. They differed from the technology schools in that they had to raise £100,000 in private sector sponsorship to match their capital grant, which was also worth £100,000, before specialising. The technology colleges programme was developed by Education Secretary John Patten in 1992. It was launched in 1993 under the terms of the Education Act 1993 as a much more affordable replacement of the CTC programme. The Department for Education designated the City Technology Colleges Trust as the main non-departmental body responsible for overseeing, promoting and delivering the new programme, with the intention of building on the fifteen CTCs which by now had become the "pilot network" for the technology colleges.

The Education Act 1993, which only applied to England and Wales, let grant-maintained and voluntary aided schools install sponsor governors and become technology colleges, subject to the consent of the Secretary of State for Education and Science. It also gave all state secondary schools, including those maintained by their LEA, the right to specialise in one or more subject areas, with specialisms in art, drama, music, sport, foreign languages and technology also giving them the right to select 10% of their pupils on aptitude or ability in one of these five areas. Specialist schools still had to teach the National Curriculum and its "core" subjects, which were maths, science, English, and until September 1993 also technology. Before the act came into force, schools in England and Wales could already specialise in the core subjects. Despite being covered by the act, no more specialist schools were established in Wales, and the schools participating in the TSI would lose their specialist school status when it ended in 1994. The act was repealed by the Education Act 1996, which retained its provisions without modifying them.

At first, the technology colleges programme retained the CTC programme's element of autonomy from the local authorities; only voluntary aided and grant-maintained schools could participate in it. This element of the programme was short-lived and LEA-maintained schools could participate from 1994. To join the programme and become a specialist technology college, schools had to put forward a bid that included £100,000 in private sector sponsorship and a three-year (later four-year) curricular development plan. If approved, the schools were then designated with technology college status and rewarded with a £100,000 capital grant to be spent towards the technology specialism over a three-year (later four-year) period to match the development plan, re-designating after this period expired. This provided the basic framework for specialist schools in England under which 90% of its secondary schools would later specialise. The required money in sponsorship would be lowered to £50,000 in 1999 and removed entirely in 2010, though designated specialist schools would not receive any additional funding after designation if they did not raise the £50,000 in sponsorship which was required for designation previously.

==== Expansion as the specialist schools programme ====
The first technology colleges were designated in 1994. With the first designations, Education Secretary John Patten announced plans to introduce more specialist schools in art, sport, music, language and business over the next five years. The technology colleges were a trial of these plans and Patten expected to see 160 more designated over the next few years. New language colleges were also announced as part of the programme, and it became the specialist schools programme (SSP). The first language colleges were designated in 1995. In 1996, arts colleges and sports colleges were also announced as part of the programme, and the first designations in these statuses were granted in 1997. Unlike the programme's other specialisms, sports colleges were supported by the Youth Sport Trust (YST). It took on the City Technology Colleges Trust's task of helping schools raise the required sponsorship for specialist designation in sport and, like it, was funded by the DfE to do so.

By the end of 1996, 182 schools had been designated with specialist school status, with the majority being Technology Colleges. In light of this, the City Technology Colleges Trust was renamed to the Technology Colleges Trust (it oversaw and delivered the programme). Cyril Taylor, chairman of the trust and successive adviser to multiple education secretaries, convinced leader of the opposition Tony Blair to support specialist schools.

=== Under New Labour: 1997–2010 ===
Following the 1997 general election, the Conservative government stepped down and was replaced by a Labour one. The new education secretary was David Blunkett. Blunkett was a supporter of the specialist schools programme and brought it to the mainstream. In 2000, Blunkett announced the launch of the city academies programme (later the academies programme). Academies were required to specialise and re-designate through free government funding, choosing whatever subject specialism they desired. By 2001, 700 schools had specialist status and a further 1300 were part of the Technology Colleges Trust's affiliation scheme. That same year new education secretary, Estelle Morris, published the education white paper Schools Achieving Success. This white paper outlined plans to introduce more specialisms and to expand the number of specialist schools to 50% of English secondaries by 2005. In 2002 the Technology Colleges Trust was renamed yet again, this time to the Specialist Schools Trust (SST). This was done to reflect the rising popularity of specialist status and to represent the increased specialisms available (there were now eight). By January 2004, 54% of English secondaries were specialists, rising to 75% by the 2005/2006 academic year. The programme was introduced to Scotland and Northern Ireland in both of these years and, by 2011, there were 44 specialist schools in Northern Ireland. In 2007, the programme was introduced to primary schools, with 34 schools receiving specialist status.

=== Developments since 2010 ===
==== End of the specialist schools programme ====
"It is because specialism is now so firmly rooted in our schools that we’ve decided that it’s the right time to give schools greater freedom to make use of the opportunities offered by specialism and the associated funding. And just so that we’re all clear, we’ve not removed the funding – all of that money will continue to go to schools – but we have removed all the strings attached to it so that schools have the freedom to spend it on, and buy in, the services they want and need without central prescription. And while this will naturally also remove the need for schools to re-designate, I hope that the SSAT, and in particular the National Head Teacher Steering Group, will continue to provide a loud and influential voice on behalf of all of its membership."

— Minister for Schools, Nick Gibb, on the new funding arrangements for specialist schools.

In 2010 Labour left government and were replaced by the Cameron–Clegg coalition. The new education secretary, Michael Gove, announced that specialist school funding from the specialist schools programme would be mainstreamed from April 2011. This meant that schools would now have to receive funds for specialisms through the Dedicated Schools Grant and no longer had to designate or re-designate for specialist status. Specialist status is now instead granted based on meeting benchmarks set by the DfE. This effectively rendered the specialist schools programme defunct. The requirement for academies to have specialisms, of which all 203 open academies had at the time, were abolished. Despite this, academies are still able to freely select and fund specialisms. The Specialist Schools Trust (now called the Specialist Schools and Academies Trust) was also stripped of government support and no longer had control over specialist designations, therefore rendering it obsolete. At around the same time, the Scottish and Northern Irish variants of the programme were discontinued. By this time, around 96.6% of secondary schools in England were specialists, with exactly 80 remaining unspecialised. In February 2011 the Minister for Schools, Nick Gibb, said this was why the funding was mainstreamed, alongside a government venture for more school autonomy.

==== Continued specialisation in England under the coalition ====
From 2011, the specialist schools policy in England continued with a new goal of turning every school into an academy or free school so that schools could be improved across the board. However, the coalition claimed to prefer a decentralised approach where it would merely influence the policy, opting to intervene when it was only required, and it instead favoured the involvement of market forces and stakeholders such as community groups and private sector organisations. In the education white paper The Importance of Teaching, it stated that it "want[ed] every school to be able to shape its own character, frame its own ethos and develop its own specialisms, free of either central or local bureaucratic constraint". This white paper led to the creation of the Education Act 2011, which removed the legal requirement for academies to specialise from November 2011.

In line with new proposals from Kenneth Baker, new university technical colleges (UTCs) were established from 2011. These are technical and vocational specialist schools for 14–18 year olds. Studio schools, which are also specialist schools for 14–18 year olds, were established from 2010. Specialist maths schools were announced by the coalition in 2011, and the first of these were established from 2014. They are selective schools for 16–19 year olds with mathematical aptitude and they offer a specialist curriculum in mathematics.

UTCs, studio schools and maths schools fall under the free school category. Introduced by the coalition, free schools are a type of academy which are established by trusts, charities, religious groups, voluntary groups, parents and teachers. The term also covers new academies which are set up through a local authority competition called the free school presumption. Free schools can be established on the basis of providing a location with a new subject specialism.

==== Specialist schools in England after the coalition ====
In 2019, 3,000 English secondary schools, or 90% of all the secondary schools in England, were specialising in one or more subjects. It was also found that community schools maintained by their local authority were just as likely as academies and other schools run by trusts to specialise. The number of specialist schools was attributed to the prevalence of state school specialisation during the second and third ministries of the Labour government that governed the United Kingdom from 1997 to 2010.

The Conservative Party's manifesto for the 2019 general election included commitments to introduce new "innovative" specialist schools. From 2020, some free schools were opened with specialist Maths or Science College status under Education Secretary Gavin Williamson's COVID-19 recovery plan. Since 2022, specialist sixth form free schools have been set to open in 55 locations in England designated by the government as Education Investment Areas through its levelling-up policy. They will mainly serve disadvantaged children identified as being "talented" so that they have the highest standard of education available in England.

== Types of specialist schools ==
=== Specialist schools programme ===
The specialist schools programme introduced 12 types of specialist schools, with an additional curricular "rural dimension" option. They were categorised between "academic specialisms" and "practical specialisms". Although the specialist schools programme is now defunct, English schools can still become one of these specialist colleges through either academisation or the Dedicated Schools Grant. Some of these specialist schools were granted the ability by the School Standards and Framework Act 1998 to admit 10% of their intake by academic aptitude, making them partially selective. Schools in the programme took part in the "community dimension", forming connections with nearby local schools and the community.

The programme was introduced to Scotland in 2005 and Northern Ireland in 2006, discontinuing in 2010 and 2011 respectively. Some Northern Irish schools have since retained specialist status.

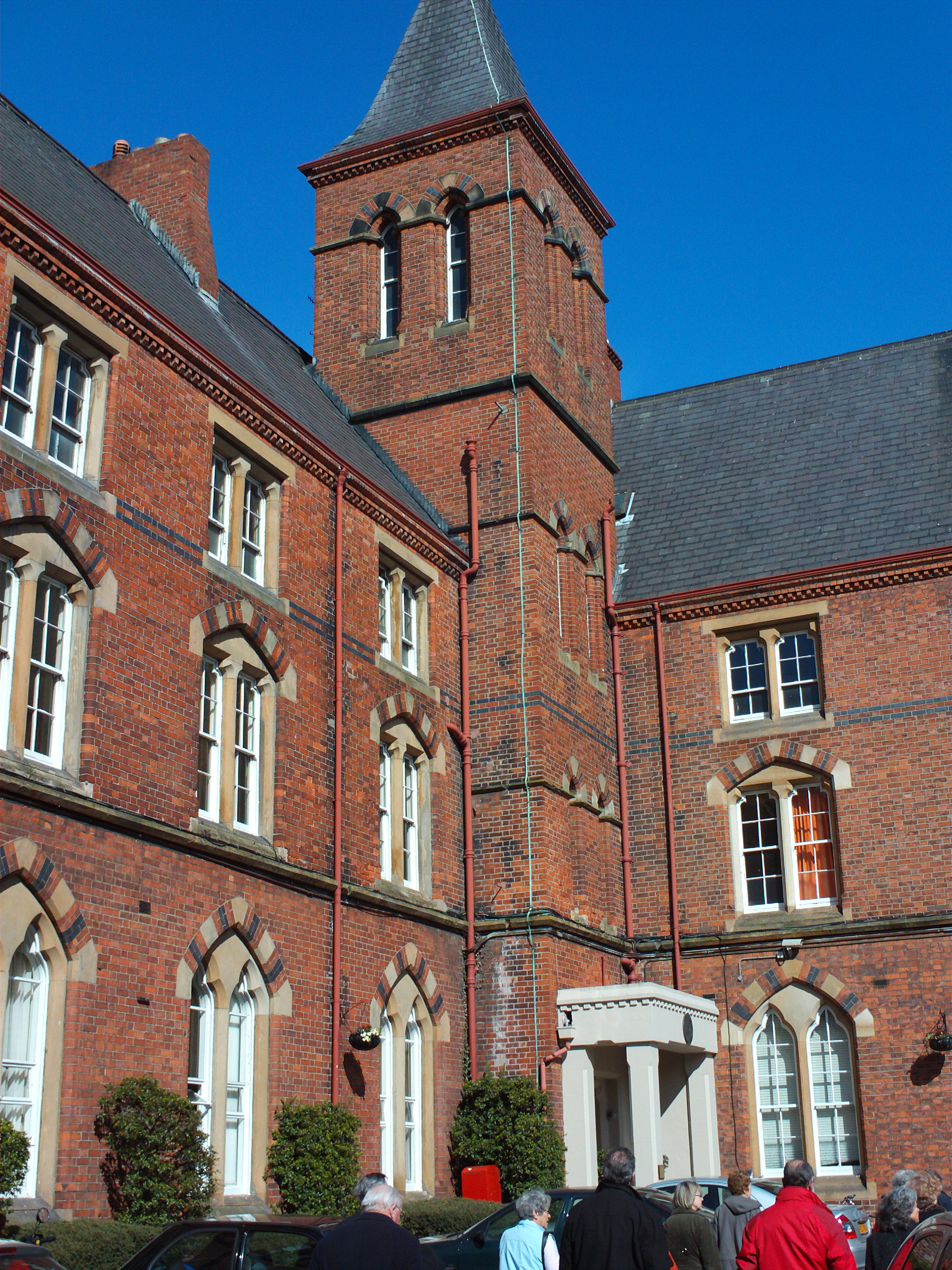
St Malachy's College in Belfast was one of the first Northern Irish specialist Music Colleges.

| Year introduced | Specialist | Specialisms | Academic or practical? | Partially selective? |
|---|---|---|---|---|
| 1994 | Technology College | Design technology, mathematics, science | Practical | No (2008 onwards) |
| 1995 | Language College | Modern foreign languages | Academic | Yes |
| 1997 | Arts College | Performing arts, visual arts, media arts, digital arts | Practical | Yes |
| 1997 | Sports College | Physical education, sports, dance | Practical | Yes |
| 2002 | Science College | Science, mathematics | Academic | No |
| 2002 | Business and Enterprise College (BEC) | Business, enterprise | Practical | No |
| 2002 | Engineering College | Engineering | Practical | No |
| 2002 | Mathematics and Computing College | Computing, ICT, mathematics | Academic | No |
| 2004 | Humanities College | Humanities | Academic | No |
| 2004 | Music College | Music | Academic | Yes |
| 2006 | Special Specialism/SEN College | Special education | Not categorised | No |
| 2006 | Vocational/Applied Learning College | Vocational education | Not categorised | No |

High performing specialist status

Some schools that demonstrated that they were achieving significantly higher results than other schools were invited to apply to be designated as high performing specialist schools. This typically allowed the school to apply for a further specialism, which brought with it additional funding so that the school could develop that further specialism. Some 900 schools (30% of specialist schools) have achieved this status.

=== Academies programme ===
The English academies programme introduced three new specialist schools; the studio school, the maths school and the university technical college (UTC). All three schools are a type of free school, which in itself is a type of academy. Studio schools typically serve around 300 14 to 19-year-old students regardless of academic aptitude and operate with a unique year-round 9 to 5 school day, meant to emulate work. Furthermore, studio schools combine academic studies and vocational education, specialising in a multitude of subject fields including gaming and marine industries. Studio schools appear to inherit the specialist schools programme's extended provision, with studio schools' specialisms usually coinciding with industries of significance in their local areas. Studio schools are usually sponsored by a diverse range of companies such as Disney, Sony, Hilton Hotels, Amazon and National Express.

UTCs also serve students from the age of 14, albeit rarely enrolling from Key Stage 3. All UTCs are controlled by university sponsors and specialise in at least one technical field that is connected to a "local industry partner". UTCs focus on a mixed technical and academic curriculum and are meant to progress their students into the technical work sector. There are seven main UTC specialisms; engineering, digital technology, design, creative media, science, health and construction.

Maths schools, as the name suggests, specialise in mathematics. They are the first exclusively sixth form specialist schools, serving students between the ages of 16 and 19. They, like UTCs, are sponsored by universities. These universities are those that are noted for being "selective mathematics universities". Maths schools admit students on a selective basis, with an 8 grade in GCSE maths being the minimum requirement. They are meant to prepare students for entry into their corresponding sponsor universities. They were announced in 2011 by the Cameron–Clegg coalition, being introduced in 2014. Although there are plans for more to be introduced from 2022, there are currently only three maths schools; King's College London Mathematics School, University of Liverpool Maths School and Exeter Mathematics School.

Normal academies are free to choose their specialisms, with some selecting unique specialisms such as Wren Academy's design and built environment specialism. This privilege is extended to free schools, with many being opened with the purpose of offering a location another subject specialism. This includes primary free schools, such as Ramsgate Arts Primary School, which has specialist status in the arts. Unique academy specialisms were dismissed by Cyril Taylor as "just weird". Taylor instead preferred "mainstream specialisations", further adding that academies should "Teach kids some basic hard academic subjects, learn to be a health worker later on!"

From 2020, some free schools have been opened with specialist Maths or Science College status under education secretary Gavin Williamson's COVID-19 recovery plan. From 2022, specialist sixth form free schools are set to open in 55 locations designated by the government as "Education Investment Areas". They will primarily serve disadvantaged children.

The precursor to academies, City Technology Colleges, specialised in technology-based subjects, mostly science and technology. City Technology Colleges were the first specialist schools and were introduced in 1988.

=== Music and dance schools ===
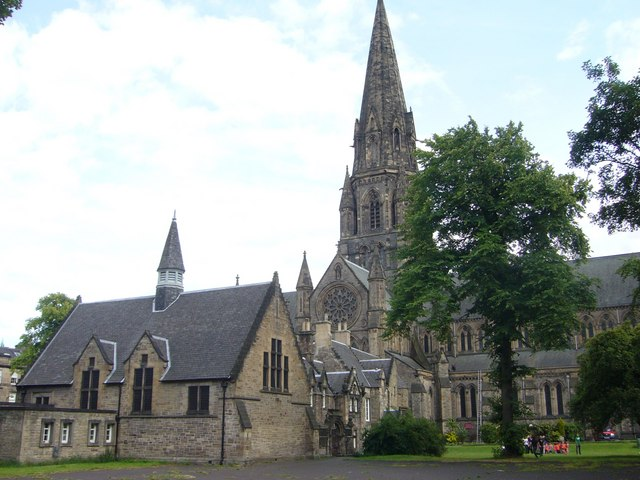
St Mary's Music School is located in Edinburgh, Scotland.

The government's Music and Dance Scheme designates nine independent boarding schools throughout England and Scotland as specialist music and dance schools. These schools provide A-Levels and Highers and also offer day places. The nine specialist schools are:

- Chetham's School of Music
- St Mary's Music School
- Wells Cathedral School
- Yehudi Menuhin School
- The Purcell School for Young Musicians
- Elmhurst Ballet School
- The Hammond School
- The Royal Ballet School
- Tring Park School for the Performing Arts

=== Football schools ===
The UK Football Schools initiative provides specialist football education. The initiative consists of football boarding schools, football academies and football universities. Some specialist football boarding schools are private and some specialist football universities are international, with additional provision in Europe. The boarding schools offer free five day trials known as "football trial camps". All schools and universities within the initiative are funded by and partnered with UK Football Schools Limited, a private limited company headquartered in Redruth, Cornwall.

=== STEM, STEAM and STREAM ===
Since 2008 multiple English schools have adopted a specialism in the four STEM subjects (science, technology, engineering, and mathematics). A rarer specialism in the five STEAM subjects has also been adopted by schools. A new specialism called STREAM (science, technology, reading, engineering, arts and mathematics) has recently been introduced. These specialist schools offer these subjects into the sixth form and provide a unique curriculum throughout the school day, offering subjects such as coding and robotics.

== Common features ==
Although there are many different types of specialist school, most share some common features. Specialist schools share a common purpose of acting as centres of excellence. For example, maths schools are expected to be centres of excellence in teaching A-Level mathematics and specialist schools introduced by the specialist schools programme and Music and Dance Scheme are centres of excellence in their designated specialisms. Specialist schools may also receive additional funding in order to facilitate their status or specialism, with maths schools receiving £350,000 every year, specialist schools from the specialist schools programme formerly receiving £100,000 every four years and music and dance schools receiving additional funds through the Music and Dance Scheme.

== Support and praise ==
=== England ===
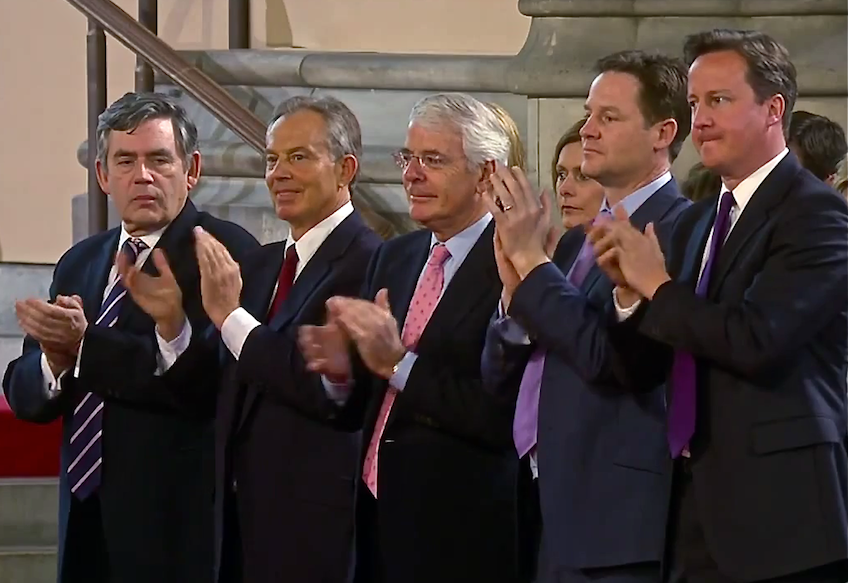
Specialist schools have been introduced under the following prime ministers. From left to right: Gordon Brown, Tony Blair, John Major, Nick Clegg (deputy) and David Cameron. (Note: This does not include Margaret Thatcher and her deputy Geoffrey Howe who presided when the first CTCs were introduced, nor does it include deputy prime ministers John Prescott and Michael Heseltine who presided over the specialist schools programme.)

The CTC programme was supported and announced by education secretary Kenneth Baker. Although most major companies and businessmen saw no reason to support the programme, sponsors were found in people like Lord Harris (later the sponsor of the Harris Federation), Harry Djanogly, Stanley Kalms and Michael Ashcroft. The City Technology Colleges Trust led by Cyril Taylor also sponsored, oversaw and delivered the programme. Taylor was the main supporter of specialist schools, often being regarded as their pioneer. The supporters within the government were Chris Patten, Tony Kerpel, Alistair Burt, George Walden, Bob Dunn and Virginia Bottomley. Prime Minister Margaret Thatcher and her chief policy adviser, Brian Griffiths, also offered their guidance and feedback on the programme. Thatcher's main motivation for this was her opposition to the LEAs and her vision to move schools out of their control. Griffiths often compared them to Soviet republics, bringing this comparison to anti-communist Thatcher:

"Prime Minister, we have a system of local authorities in Britain. They own the schools, they plan for the schools, they control everything that happens within the schools, they fix the compensation of everyone who is employed in schools, they decide on new schools and closing old schools. This is like a bunch of Soviet republics; we have in Britain effectively a bunch of Soviet republics, and the whole thing needs to be opened up."

In July 1991, the new Prime Minister John Major praised CTCs for "meeting head-on a demand for technical education, which as a country we have neglected for a century past." He also announced plans to "remove the technical and legal obstacles that stand in the way of those voluntary-aided schools that wish to become City Technology Colleges." Major further praised CTCs for their claimed parental accountability, saying they offered "high standards of work, attendance and aspiration."

In 1994, following the Education Act 1993, widespread school specialisation was introduced, beginning the specialist schools programme. John Major announced the introduction of specialist Sports Colleges two years later, citing them as a solution to the lack of weekly two hour PE provision in half of schools. By 1997, when Labour entered government, new education secretary David Blunkett and Prime Minister Tony Blair both supported school specialisation. In a July 2000 session of parliament, Maidenhead MP Theresa May enquired Blunkett on whether he accepted specialist school statistics, noting that the number of student A to C grade GCSE results improved by only two thirds of that in non-specialists. Blunkett accepted the negative statistics, using them as a reason why more specialist schools needed to be designated. A year later, the new education secretary Estelle Morris published the education paper Schools Achieving Success. The expansion of the specialist schools programme was one of the primary agendas of the white paper. At around the same time, Tony Blair's spokesman Alastair Campbell proclaimed that the "days of the bog-standard comprehensive" were over. Blair wanted the comprehensive system in England to be replaced by a "diversified" specialist school system and it was found in September of that year that specialist schools performed 10% higher than non-specialists in exam results.

In 2002, Professor David Jesson began researching specialist schools. His research concluded with an emphasis of achievement brought by specialists and the approval of government policy to expand them. Jesson would be employed by the Specialist Schools Trust in 2003, continuing research and releasing reports on specialist schools annually until 2013. Jesson's reports often concluded that specialist schools resulted in better student outcomes. It was found that non-selective specialist schools achieved significantly higher results at GCSE results than non-specialist comprehensive schools, that they achieved higher "added value" when prior achievement was taken into account, and that the gains had increased with the length of time the school had been specialist. Other studies found that specialist schools performed slightly better at GCSE, particularly benefitting more able pupils and narrowing the gap between boys and girls.

In 2004, education secretary Charles Clarke stated that the government wanted all schools to be specialist. He also praised specialist schools as a mass movement raising standards and improving student outcomes.

In 2005, education watchdog Ofsted made their second evaluation of specialist schools, making the following summary:

"Being a specialist school makes a difference. Working to declared targets, dynamic leadership by key players, a renewed sense of purpose, the willingness to be a pathfinder, targeted use of funding and being part of an optimistic network of like-minded schools all contribute to an impetus and climate for improvement."

The Chief Inspector of Schools in England, David Bell, praised better teaching, performance and sense of purpose in specialist schools when compared to their unspecialised counterparts. Local schools close to specialists also benefited. Minister for School Standards Stephen Twigg hailed the evaluation, saying it "underlined the fact that specialist status drives up standards."

In 2009, Kenneth Baker (announcer of the CTCs) and Ronald Dearing conceptualised the UTC. They established the Baker Dearing Educational Trust for its promotion and development, being granted the right to the UTC trademark and brand. The trademark and brand are licensed by the trust to the UTCs and it has a significant say in the UTC sub-programme of the academies programme. The first UTC was established in September 2010 with a further 58 UTCs following in subsequent years. Studio schools were also introduced in 2010. At first they were supported by the Studio Schools Trust but after the trust closed it was replaced by the Studio Schools Network. These two specialist schools were introduced under David Cameron and Nick Clegg's 2010 coalition government as part of the expansion of the academies programme. Michael Gove, the education secretary who introduced these specialists, praised studio schools as benefitting "both business and young people".

In January 2017, Prime Minister Theresa May announced her intention for every British city to have a maths school as part of an attempt to encourage technical education after Brexit. A budget of £170 million was allocated for this purpose. She called the King's College London Mathematics School "brilliant" and a "great example of a free school". In 2019, King's claimed that all of its students received an A or A* grade in A-level mathematics, with 90% of these being A*. Over a quarter of the school's students were said to have successfully applied to Oxbridge in that year.

=== Scotland ===
The devolved Scottish Labour-Lib Dem government introduced specialist schools in 2005 through the Schools of Ambition programme. The Convention of Scottish Local Authorities (COSLA) gave their support for the programme and showed enthusiasm for helping the schools involved. However, COSLA spokesman Ewan Aitken warned that cooperation would only be provided if no "strings" were attached.

== Opposition and criticism ==
=== England ===
The CTC programme faced opposition from members of both the Labour and Conservative Parties and also by LEAs and teaching unions. Media coverage for the programme was largely antagonistic, with CTCs being accused of expanding academic selection (despite being non-selective) and privatising education. Increasing opposition meant that only 15 CTCs could be established, despite an original goal of 200. This led to the creation of the Technology College and the specialist schools programme in 1994. Opposition was still rampant, especially in Labour until later that year, when LEA schools were granted the ability to apply to the programme.

In 2001, wealth segregation in the education system was researched by Professor Stephen Gorard of Cardiff University. Specialist schools were found to have admitted fewer people from a poorer background, however Gorard was unable to confirm if the increase of specialist schools linked to greater segregation. It was also found that former church and grant-maintained schools with specialist status were more strongly segregated than those that were not. Gorard made his findings by using free school meals as an indicator of poverty. General secretary of teachers union NASUWT, Nigel de Gruchy, welcomed increased school funding but was "deeply disappointed" that it was favouring specialist schools, accusing it of being discriminatory. Doug McAvoy, general secretary of NUT, claimed that specialist schools were creating a two-tier education system and that they did nothing to fix the problems of increasing teacher shortages and low morale. He blamed the better results specialists produced on their extra funding and partial selection. John Dunford, general secretary of the Secondary Heads Association, warned that unless the extra funding allocated to specialist schools were given to all secondary schools a two-tier education system may very well be created.

In 2002, it was reported that many headteachers were finding it difficult to raise the required sponsorship for specialist designation.

In 2003, the Commons Education Select Committee requested that ministers withdraw specialist schools' extra funding if standards remained low in partnered comprehensives schools. It was claimed that this funding, alongside the partial selection entitled to some specialist schools, created inequality between them and their unspecialised counterparts. Specialist schools were claimed to have created a hierarchy of schools and Lib Dem MP Paul Holmes said every headteacher he had spoken to in private had only applied their schools to the programme for "the extra money". Ofsted confirmed that a fifth of schools specialised for this reason. Some specialists were also found illegally admitting their intakes by misinterpreting the 10% aptitude rule in their entitled partial selection. Two years later, NASUWT president Peter McLoughlin warned that specialist schools were limiting choice for parents in a speech where he claimed "Most parents cannot exercise choice in relation to the schools their children attend. The expansion of one school will lead to the closure of a less popular school, many of which are in deprived areas, depriving whole communities. You will have a kind of beauty contest between schools." McLoughlin also warned of the supposed two-tier system being created by specialist schools and academies.

In 2007, it was found that specialist schools were performing nearly the same as non-specialists. There was only a small 1.5% increase in GCSE results for specialist schools with an exception of Sports Colleges, which were found to perform 0.5% worse than non-specialists. Furthermore, Chief Inspector of Schools in England Christine Gilbert stated that specialist status was not guaranteed to improve standards in teaching. She requested that the Specialist Schools and Academies Trust (SSAT) discuss the impact of the specialist schools programme since "If teaching had not improved, it's hard to see that learning would."

Since 2016, UTCs have largely been considered to be failing. In 2016, one in ten UTCs had closed or converted into non-UTC secondary schools. The number of pupils attending UTCs have decreased by 40% in those that were established between 2010 and 2013. One in five UTCs have been given an inadequate Ofsted grade and 40% require improvement. Furthermore, over half of the overall students attending UTCs have dropped out and students that are still attending perform worse than those at non-UTC secondary schools. A mere 50% of these students pass GCSE maths and English. The DfE have spent £792 million on UTCs. Michael Gove, the education secretary who introduced UTCs, also called them a failure. A similar fate has befallen studio schools. Toby Young, a vocal advocate of free schools, believes that these schools fail because of their comprehensive character, which leads to them being "dumping grounds" for undesirable students who may be underperforming or misbehaved. Young has proposed making UTCs and studio schools selective to solve this issue.

In 2022, the government announced plans to establish "elite" specialist sixth form free schools for talented disadvantaged children. Opposition and scepticism has already formed around these sixth forms and people have called for the government to instead increase funds for further education as a whole.

=== Scotland ===
Schools of Ambition faced opposition in Scotland from its announcement. The Scottish National Party (SNP), Scottish Socialist Party and Scottish Conservatives opposed the plan because of its selective and insufficient nature. SNP education spokesman Fiona Hyslop feared that it would only benefit a few school children and accused the education secretary Peter Peacock of playing "catch-up". Meanwhile, the Scottish Conservative education spokesman, James Douglas-Hamilton, believed it was insufficient and did nothing to address the alleged two-tier system in Scottish state education. Then, a year after its implementation, Scottish Labour announced plans to expand the Schools of Ambition initiative by creating six new "Science Academies". Science Academies were to be separate from Science Colleges, specialising in physics, chemistry and biology for Highers and Advanced Highers. The Scottish Lib Dems opposed the plans despite being in coalition with Labour, with party chairman Iain Smith fearing a "backdoor" introduction of academic selection. Science Academies were also opposed by some in the Scottish Science Advisory Council.

In 2008, a year after the new SNP government was elected, it was announced by Fiona Hyslop (who was now education secretary) that Schools of Ambition would be discontinued in 2010. Scotland continues to have no academies or free schools, therefore meaning that specialist schools continue to be absent from state education.

=== Wales ===
In 1999, government in Wales was devolved. As a result, the Welsh Government maintained its own independent education policy. Part of this policy was the strict defence of the "community, comprehensive model". This resulted in fierce opposition to specialist schools and academies and, in 2011, 99.5% of Welsh schools were comprehensive. Minister for Education and Skills Leighton Andrews is claimed to have privately considered Welsh academisation but this never came to fruition.

== See also ==
- David Jesson
