= Education Investment Area =

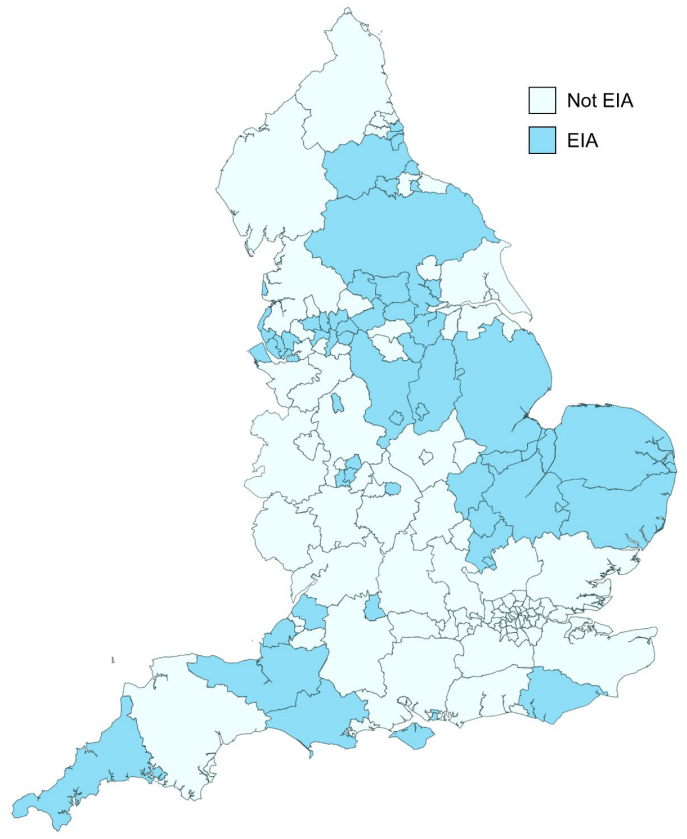
A map of all designated Education Investment Areas as of February 2022

In England, Education Investment Areas (EIAs) are educationally underperforming areas prioritised for extra funding and support by the British government, with the intention of improving standards. They were introduced in 2022 as part of the levelling-up policy of the British government. There are currently 55 Education Investment Areas; 24 of these have been designated as Priority Education Investment Areas, sharing an additional fund of £40 million.

== Characteristics ==
Alongside further government support and funding, Education Investment Areas benefit from a number of perks. Their local authorities are to be given £30 million over a three-year period to fund opportunities and care for children with special needs. Retainage will be enforced on successful teachers in a bid to keep them teaching important school subjects. The areas will also be preferred for the establishment of sixth form specialist schools with free school status. Underperforming schools in Education Investment Areas (153 schools in February 2022) will be brought under the control of successful multi-academy trusts.

From September 2022, Education Investment Areas will be at the forefront of the government's plan to have all schools become academies by 2030. The government is expected to cooperate with dioceses, academy trusts and local authorities with the intention of encouraging further academisation in these areas. Each area will also have a plan for developing multi-academy trusts which will be drawn up by Autumn 2022.

In October 2022, 29 local authorities were revealed to have expressed their interest in creating new multi-academy trusts during the government's "test and learn" exercise held in July, which allowed all local authorities in the country to announce their interest. The government was most enthusiastic to work with those authorities deemed to be "high performing", particularly those in the Education Investment Areas, and 17 of them were in one of the areas.

33% of English local authorities are Education Investment Areas.

== Historical precedents ==
=== Education Priority Areas ===
The Labour government of Harold Wilson introduced Education Priority Areas (EPAs) in the late 1960s. Located in areas of deprivation, these were schools prioritised by the government for construction funding. They were based on findings from the Newsom Report and proposed in the Plowden Report. The Plowden Report advised that around 10% of Britain's deprived areas be recognised as Education Priority Areas, a proposal that received bipartisan support in parliament. Despite this, a proper initiative never materialised, and over 500 individual primary schools became Education Priority Areas instead. Their teachers were given extra pay. Education Priority Areas reached their peak in the early 1970s and had swiftly declined by the beginning of Margaret Thatcher's premiership. The last priority areas were phased out after 1987.

=== Education Action Zones ===
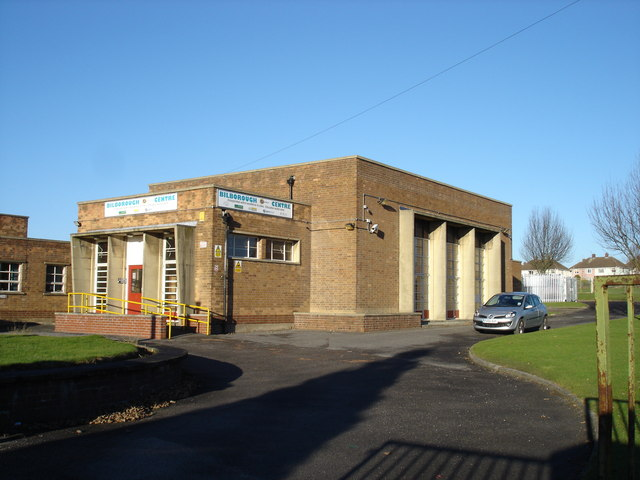
An Education Action Zone Centre in Bilborough, Nottingham

The Labour government of Tony Blair introduced Education Action Zones (EAZs) through the School Standards and Framework Act 1998. They centred around groups of local schools in deprived areas and were supposed to improve educational standards in cooperation with local businesses. 25 zones were designated in the 1998/1999 academic year, benefitting from £750,000 annually. They had to raise £250,000 through private sector sponsorship every year. These zones were governed by Education Action Forums, charitable organisations made up of trustees from schools and businesses. The forums employed staff, agreed plans for improvement with the Department for Education and Skills and were led by directors. 47 more zones were formed in 2000, with a lifespan of three to five years. After they expired, the zones either joined the Excellence in Cities programme or became new "Excellence Clusters". Applications for specialist school designation from these zones were prioritised against those from the rest of the country. Schools located in these zones were allowed to disregard the National Curriculum.

=== Opportunity Areas ===
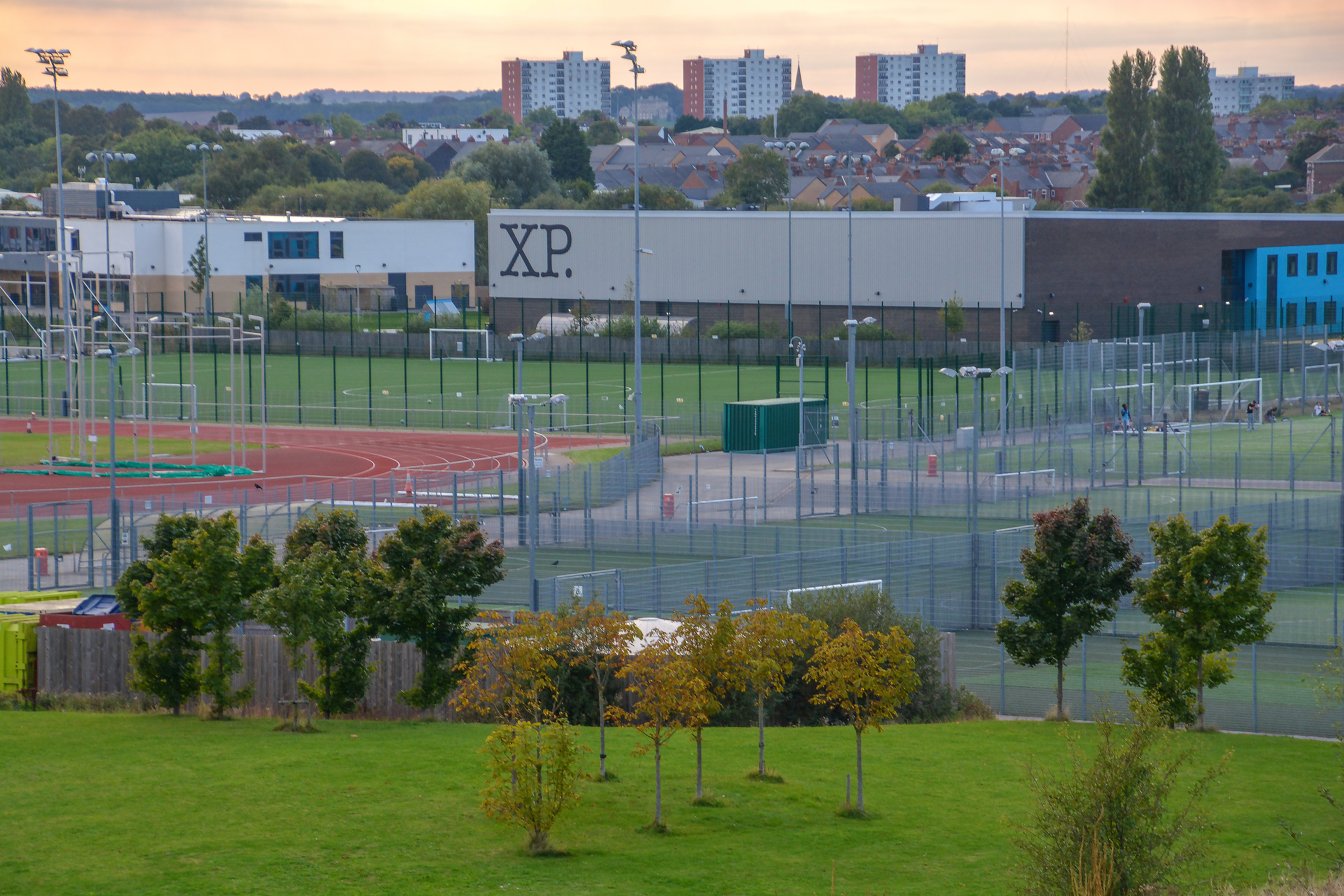
The XP School in Doncaster, one of the first Opportunity Areas, in 2020

The Conservative government of Theresa May introduced Opportunity Areas (OAs) in 2016, after an announcement from Education Secretary Justine Greening in October. They were socially immobile areas that received priority from the Department for Education and had within them cooperation between local businesses, charities and educational institutions. Six were established in 2016, an amount that doubled in 2017. The areas shared an additional fund of £72 million, with the intention of boosting employability and standards in education. Another £3.5 million was allocated to these areas by the government through a partnership with the Education Endowment Foundation, for the establishment of new research schools; schools that implemented the foundation's research to boost teaching standards. The areas were expected to expire in 2020, but the government announced an £18 million fund to continue support until August 2021. Another extension for 2022 was also announced, although they were soon incorporated into the new Education Investment Areas later that year.

== See also ==
- Levelling-up policy of the British government
- Pupil premium
- Excellence in Cities
