= Education Act 2011 =

Act of the Parliament of the United Kingdom

Education Act 2011 (Note: Section 83(1).)
- Act of Parliament
- Parliament of the United Kingdom
- Long title: An Act to make provision about education, childcare, apprenticeships and training; to make provision about schools and the school workforce, institutions within the further education sector and Academies; to abolish the General Teaching Council for England, the Training and Development Agency for Schools, the School Support Staff Negotiating Body, the Qualifications and Curriculum Development Agency and the Young People’s Learning Agency for England; to make provision about the Office of Qualifications and Examinations Regulation and the Chief Executive of Skills Funding; to make provision about student loans and fees; and for connected purposes.
- Citation: 2011 c. 21
- Introduced by: Michael Gove MP (Commons); Lord Hill of Oareford (Lords)
- Territorial extent: England and Wales, except that part 10 also extend to Scotland and Northern Ireland, and that any amendment or repeal made by the act has the same extent as the enactment amended or repealed. (Note: Section 81.)

Dates
- Royal assent: 15 November 2011
- Commencement: See § Commencement (Note: Section 82.)
Other legislation
Amends	House of Commons Disqualification Act 1975; Water Industry Act 1991; Further and Higher Education Act 1992; Value Added Tax Act 1994; Education Act 1994; Education Act 1996; Government of Wales Act 1998; Education and Inspections Act 2006; Safeguarding Vulnerable Groups Act 2006
Amended by	Education and Adoption Act 2016
Relates to	Education Act 1996; Childcare Act 2006Apprenticeships, Skills, Children and Learning Act 2009

Status: Amended

History of passage through Parliament

Text of statute as originally enacted

Revised text of statute as amended

The Education Act 2011 (c. 21) is an act of the Parliament of the United Kingdom. It was the first major piece of education legislation to be introduced by the coalition government, and makes changes to many areas of educational policy, including the power of school staff to discipline students, the manner in which newly trained teachers are supervised, the regulation of qualifications, the administration of local authority maintained schools, academies, the provision of post-16 education, including vocational apprenticeships, and student finance for higher education.

The act also brought about the abolition of the General Teaching Council for England, the Qualifications and Curriculum Development Agency and the Training and Development Agency for Schools, amongst other bodies.

The act is divided into ten parts, and comprises 83 Sections and 18 Schedules.

== Parliamentary passage ==
The Secretary of State for Education, Michael Gove, introduced the Education Bill to the House of Commons on 26 January 2011 when it also received its first reading. Two weeks later, on 8 February 2011, the Commons debated the general principles of the Bill before passing it at second reading, before committing it to a public bill committee to be scrutinised in depth by a select, cross party group of MPs. The committee stage lasted 11 days throughout March and the beginning of April, before returning to the main floor of the Commons on 11 May 2011, where consideration at report stage was completed alongside its third reading, thus completing its passage through the lower house.

The bill as passed by the Commons was introduced to the House of Lords the following day, before receiving its second reading following a debate on 14 June. It was sent to a grand committee of all peers for detailed scrutiny, which sat for eight days before the summer recess of Parliament, and for three days afterwards, before returning for four days of report stage scrutiny in the Lords chamber. It passed its third reading, and thus passed the House of Lords, on 9 November, when it was returned to the Commons to obtain agreement to the various amendments to the bill made during its passage through the upper house. The Commons accepted all of the Lords' amendments without further amendment after debate on 14 November, allowing it to receive royal assent and become an Act of Parliament the following day.

== Provisions ==
The act is divided into 10 distinct parts, each of which are summarised below.

=== Part 1 - Early years provision ===
Part 1 makes provision for the organisation and supply of early years learning by amending the Childcare Act 2006 to extend the duty on all English local authorities that requires them to provide 15 hours of early years education free of charge for all three- and four-year-olds and to all two-year-olds identified as disadvantaged. The Secretary of State and local authorities will determine those who fall into such a category through the tax credit information held by Her Majesty's Revenue and Customs and tax information held by the Department for Work and Pensions, which the Secretary of State is authorised to receive by virtue of Section 1(3) of the act, which also makes it a criminal offence for anyone to disclose such information without authorisation.

=== Part 2 - Discipline ===
Part 2 extends the power given to school staff in Section 550ZA of the Education Act 1996 to search a pupil or their possessions if they believe them to be carrying certain items to include power to search if the member of staff believes one or more of the possessions have been, or may be used, to commit a criminal offence, cause personal injury or damage property. Staff are also given the power to search a student even if they are under the age of criminal responsibility, and for staff of the opposite sex to the student to search said student if they believe the risk is so great that serious harm would be caused if they waited or attempted to find a member of staff who is the same sex as the student to be searched. Clarification is also provided as to when "reasonable force" can be used by staff to confiscate items, as well as setting out the process to be followed if specified items are found. Teachers are also given the power to examine data files on electronic devices and delete them if they believe there is good reason to do so.

Part 2 also, through Section 4, gives headteachers of maintained schools and lead teachers of pupil referral units in England the power to exclude a pupil either permanently or for a fixed-term for disciplinary reasons. The section also gives the excluded party the power to appeal to a "review panel" if the headteacher or lead teacher has decided not to reinstate a pupil, who may uphold the exclusion, recommend a review of the exclusion by the headteacher or lead teacher, or quash the exclusion and force the headteacher to reconsider the exclusion.

Section 5 of Part 2 removes the requirement on a school to provide a student's parent, guardian or carer with 24 hours' written notice of an out of school detention, whilst Section 6 removes the duty imposed on schools by the Apprenticeships, Skills, Children and Learning Act 2009 to enter into behaviour and attendance partnerships with other authorities in a local area.

=== Part 3 - School workforce ===
Part 3 abolishes the General Teaching Council for England (GTCE), and transfers the majority of its functions to the Secretary of State, including the power to investigate disciplinary cases, issue prohibition orders to bar a person from teaching and maintain a register of those barred from teaching. The abolition of the GTCE does not affect the General Teaching Council for Wales, which continues to exist with all of the powers it currently holds.

Section 9 legislates for all new teachers in England to be required to serve an induction period, a practice that already currently exists but is administered by the GTCE, whose abolition requires the Secretary of State to take on the responsibility for the procedure, as this section sets out.

Part 3, through Section 13, also introduces restrictions on the reporting of allegations made against teachers by students, including the reporting of information through which a teacher against whom an allegation has been made could be identified. Such restrictions would only be lifted once a teacher is charged with a criminal offence, or when the Secretary of State publishes certain information. The act makes it a criminal offence to breach these restrictions, including through reporting on the internet.

Sections 14 to 17 abolish the Training and Development Agency for Schools, and transfers its functions to the Secretary of State, who is in turn given power to delegate Welsh responsibilities of the TDA on Welsh Ministers. Section 18 authorises the abolition of the School Support Staff Negotiating Body, whilst Section 19 makes minor amendments to preceding legislation regarding school budgets.

=== Part 4 - Qualifications and the Curriculum ===
In Part 4, Clause 20 gives the Secretary of State the power to direct the governing bodies of schools to participate in certain international education surveys.

Part 4 also makes changes to the operation and management of Ofqual, the government's qualifications regulator. It changes the title of the Chief Executive of Ofqual to 'Chief Regulator' who will now be appointed by The Queen through an order in council, whilst the Chairman of Ofqual, who was previously known as the 'Chief Regulator' and appointed by the Queen, will now simply be the Chairman, and appointed directly by the Secretary of State. Provisions are also made about how Chairman and Chief Regulator will be appointed, the length of their terms of office, their salaries and pensions. Section 22 provides a definition of what Ofqual's objectives are in relation to the standard of qualifications offered. Section 23 gives Ofqual the power to impose financial penalties on qualification awarding bodies if they have failed to comply with a condition of their recognition, and sets out detailed conditions as to how such penalties are to be administered, whilst Section 24 provides Welsh Ministers with similar powers to those granted to Ofqual through Section 23.

The Qualification and Curriculum Development Agency (QCDA) is abolished by Sections 25-27, and its powers and functions transferred to the Secretary of State, who is also given power to introduce a scheme to transfer the staff, properties and liabilities of the QCDA to the Secretary of State and Department for Education.

Section 28 removes the Secretary of State's powers to give directions to local authorities regarding the provision of careers and post-16 education advice, and the requirement that schools must provide people involved in careers advice access to both students and school facilities. Section 29 legislates that all schools must continually provide students aged between 14-16 careers advice that is completely independent and that provides impartial information about all post-16 training options, including apprenticeships.

Sections 30 and 31 repeal unenacted provisions from the Apprenticeships, Skills, Children and Learning Act 2009 relating to diploma entitlements.

=== Part 5 - Educational institutions: other provisions ===
Part 5 removes the need for school governing bodies to publish a 'school profile', and for the local authority to appoint 'school improvement partners'. Section 34 of Part 5 removes a local authority's need to set up 'admission forums', as well as making slight alterations to the powers of the schools adjudicator in relation to school admissions. Section 35 imposes a cap on the charge that can be made for providing milk, school meals and other refreshments to pupils, preventing any charge being higher than the cost of providing such a service, whilst also giving schools the power to charge different prices for the same item.

Section 37 enacts Schedule 11 of the act which makes provision about the creation of new schools. It requires that when a local authority is of the opinion that a new school is required, it must seek proposals for such a school to be created through the creation of a new academy school, and that no competition for the creation of a new school may begin without the local authority obtaining the consent of the Secretary of State. The Schedule sets out the various bureaucratic processes that must be conducted by both the local authority and Secretary of State when the local authority decides that a new school is needed. The interpretation of this section of the act was tested by a judicial review in November 2012, when the court upheld the decision of Richmond Local Authority to establish Voluntary Aided schools, St. Richard Reynolds Catholic College, without first seeking proposals for an Academy.

Section 38 reduces the number of different categories of governors that must be elected or appointed to a school's governing body, whilst Section 39 makes provision for the procedure to dissolve the governing body of a single school within a wider federation of schools should the school wish to leave the federation in order to convert to academy status.

Section 40 gives power to the Chief Inspector of schools to create a list of 'exempt schools' that do not need to be inspected at the regular intervals set out in the Education Act 2005, whilst Section 41 makes provision about what matters should be covered by a school inspection. Further education and sixth-form colleges that received an 'Outstanding' inspection grading in their last inspection are given exemption from future inspections by virtue of Section 42, whilst Section 43 clarifies the requirements of inspections of schools that provide boarding accommodation. Section 44 gives the Secretary of State additional powers to intervene in schools that have been judged by Ofsted to require improvement, including the power to direct the closure of any school that has failed to comply with performance standards. Section 45 removes the requirement of the Local Government Ombudsman to consider complaints about a school from parents and pupils, as well as strengthening the Secretary of State's power to intervene when they are of the opinion that a governing body is acting or intends to act in an unreasonable manner.

Section 46 gives the Secretary of State the power, after consultation, to direct a local authority to revise parts of the scheme they are required to keep that details its financial relationship with schools under its control, whilst the governing body is given the power to use the school's budget to reimburse the local authority any outstanding funds following the retirement, dismissal or resignation of members of staff employed by the school for 'community purposes' by Section 47. Section 48 amends Education Act 1996 to give governing bodies the power to charge for early years provision that is provided beyond the 15 hours of free provision provided by Part 1 of the act, which can include charges to maintain the upkeep of buildings and their utility supplies, education materials, and for the employment of teaching staff.

Section 49 enacts Schedule 12 to the act, which gives additional powers to further education and sixth-form colleges, including the power to borrow money to run their education services without having to first gain the permission of either the Young People's Learning Agency for England (YPLA) or their local authority, and the removal of the duty on post-16 establishments to "promote the economic and social wellbeing of an area". The Secretary of State is given the power to dissolve a further education college of sixth-form without having to consult the YPLA as is currently required, as well as to create a new sixth-form college without having to wait for a local authority to request such a creation. The Secretary of State is also given the power to draw up the initial instruments and articles of government of a new sixth-form, a function previously undertaken by the YPLA. As a result of the removal of almost all of their responsibilities, Schedule 12 also dissolves the YPLA and transfers any remaining powers to the Secretary of State. The Schedule also removes the need for post-16 governing bodies to have regard to possible future staff and students in the exercise of their functions, as well as transferring to the Secretary of State the power currently held by the Chief Executive of Skills Funding in respect of further education colleges, and by the local authority in respect to sixth-form colleges, to intervene in establishments that are considered to be either mismanaged or failing.

The final provisions of part 5 relate to Pupil Referral Units (PRUs), with Section 50 providing for PRUs to be allocated funding by the local authority in the same manner as maintained schools, whilst Section 51 repeals unenacted provisions in the Apprenticeships, Skills, Children and Learning Act 2009 that would have renamed PRUs as 'Short-Stay Schools'.

=== Part 6 - Academies ===
Part 6 removes the need for academies to have a specialism in one or more specific subject areas, as well as providing for the creation of specific '16-19 academies' and 'alternative provision academies' instead of the currently one size fits all academy. Section 55 makes it necessary for the Secretary of State to involve the appropriate religious body in the decision making process to convert a foundation school, a voluntary aided school or a voluntary controlled school to an academy, whilst Section 56 places a requirement on the governing bodies of maintained schools to consult all those who they see fit before they opt to convert to academy status. Section 57 allows for the conversion of a federated school to an academy without the agreement of the whole federated body, section 58 clarifies that a local authority is not prohibited from providing an academy with assistance, financially or otherwise, should it believe it would be beneficial, whilst Section 59 makes technical amendments to the power held by the Secretary of State by virtue of the Academies Act 2010 regarding the transfer of properties and other liabilities from the local authority to a new academy.

Section 61 deals with boarding provision at academy schools, and provides in certain circumstances for the boarding fees of a student to be remitted by the local authority in which that students would have resided if they had not been attending a boarding school. The two conditions are defined as when the local authority was unable to provide a non-boarding school place for the student, or when paying the boarding fees would place the paying family in financial hardship. Section 62 meanwhile gives academies with a religious character the same rights as maintained school to employ a number of "reserve" teachers who are capable of teaching religious education in accordance with the religious denomination of the school, as well as the power to appoint people specifically because of their religious character.

Section 63 enacts Schedule 14 relating to the land academies may own, and gives the Secretary of State the power to transfer the publicly funded land held by maintained school to an academy, but whilst also protecting the public interest in any such land. The Secretary of State is given the power to obtain through compulsory purchase any land a local authority has sold without his consent to a third party, if he believes such land is now needed by an academy. Section 64 places academies on the same basis as maintained school with regards to the power of a parent, pupil, or the Secretary of State, to refer the academy's admissions arrangements to the School Adjudicator, and thus extends many of the Adjudicator's power to include academies.

=== Part 7 - Post-16 education and training ===
Part 7 abolishes the Young People's Learning Agency for England (YPLA), and transfers its functions and duties to the Secretary of State, as well as giving the Secretary of State the power to introduce a scheme to allow for the transfer of the staff, properties and liabilities of the YPLA to the Department of Education, through the Secretary of State.

Section 69 of Part 7 requires the Chief Executive of Skills Funding to prioritise funding in order to secure an apprenticeship offer for certain people, namely those aged between 16-18, those aged 19–24 who are care-leavers, and those aged 19–24 who are disabled. Section 71 makes the Secretary of State the default issuer of apprenticeship certificates, but provides him with the power to appoint another person to exercise this responsibility.

Section 72 gives the Secretary of State power to compel the Chief Executive of Skills Funding to consult with certain people about the exercise of his duties and functions, whilst Section 73 reduces the right to fee remission for vocational training only to those aged between 19 and 24. Finally, Section 74 gives the Secretary of State greater flexibility in the commencement of the provisions of the Education and Skills Act 2008 regarding the raising of the education and training leaving age to 18, but does not alter the inherent requirement for the leaving age to have been fully raised to 18 by 2015.

=== Part 8 - Direct payments ===
Part 8, which consists solely of Section 75, gives the Secretary of State the power to create pilot schemes that would allow local authorities to make direct payments to secure goods and services for students who they hold a statement of Special Educational Needs (SEN) or Education Health and Care plan (EHC plan).

=== Part 9 - Student finance ===
Part 9 gives the Secretary of State greater power to set the interest rates that are to be charged of student loans made to those who commence their courses on or after 1 September 2012, the day on which the level of tuition fee is permitted to increase to a maximum level of £9,000 per year. The rates the Secretary of State sets cannot, however, be out of line with the rates at the time being offered on loan available to the public. Section 77 introduces limits on the amount a higher education institution can charge students undertaking courses on a part-time basis in order to ensure they do not exceed the equivalent charges being made to full-time students.

=== Part 10 - General ===
Section 78 gives the Secretary of State power to implement the provisions of this Act through the use of one or more Statutory Instruments, and defines how any such instruments are to be approved. Section 79 provides detailed citations of preceding Acts of Parliament that are referenced in the act, Section 80 allows for any charges incurred in the implementation of the act to be paid for by Parliament, whilst Section 81 details the territorial extent of the act within the United Kingdom. Section 82 details when and how the provisions of the act are to be implemented, whilst Section 83 authorises the act to be called the Education Act 2011, and for it to be included in the official list of Education Acts maintained in Section 578 of the Education Act 1996.

== Commencement ==
Different provisions of the act were brought into law at different stages, as specified by Section 78, and the resulting Statutory Instruments made under that Section. The table below summarises these different commencement dates.

Date	Provisions enacted
15 November 2011	Sections 33, 40(1)-(3), 40(5)-(9), 41, 42(1)-(7), 42(9)-(11), 58 and 75-83
17 November 2011	Section 44
15 January 2012	Sections 5, 6, 26(1), 30, 31, 47, 48, 51 and 61
1 February 2012	Sections 18-20, 22, 28(5), 29(1), 29(2), 29(8), 32, 34-36, 40(4), 42(8), 43, 46, 52, 53, 55-56, 59-60, 62-65 and 74 and Schedules 10, 11, 14 and 15
1 April 2012	Sections 2-3, 7-12, 14-17, 21, 25-27, 49, 54, 57, 66-68, 71-72 and 73(3) and Schedules 2-3, 5-9, 12-13 and 16-17
1 May 2012	Sections 23 and 24
1 August 2012	Sections 45 and 73(1)-73(2)
1 September 2012	Sections 1, 4, 38-39, 50, 69-70 in full, the parts of Sections 28 and 29 not previously enacted, and Schedules 1 and 18
1 October 2012	Section 13 and Schedule 4
1 August 2013	The parts of Section 73 not previously enacted

The remaining provisions will be enacted on a day to be appointed by a Minister of the Crown by further statutory instruments.

== See also ==
- Education Act
