= Bodens Performing Arts College =

- Type: Performing Arts College
- Established: 2014
- Location: Islington, United Kingdom; 51°32′41.7″N 0°7′19.5″W

Bodens Performing Arts College is a full-time Performing Arts College for students aged 16–19 years based in Islington, London. The part-time school was established in 1973, leading to the opening of the full-time college in 2014. Students undertake a Level 3 Extended in Performing Arts, and a Trinity Level 4 Associate Diploma in Acting or Musical Theatre. The course is performance based and students work with resident tutors on a full-time basis, complemented by guest tutors from across the country, experts in their field.
