= Education and Adoption Act 2016 =

Act of the Parliament of the United Kingdom

Education and Adoption Act 2016 (Note: Section 20.)
- Act of Parliament
- Parliament of the United Kingdom
- Long title: An Act to make provision about schools in England that are causing concern, including provision about their conversion into Academies and about intervention powers; and to make provision about joint arrangements for carrying out local authority adoption functions in England.
- Citation: 2016 c. 6
- Introduced by: Nicky Morgan (Commons); Lord Nash (Lords)
- Territorial extent: England and Wales (Note: Section 18.)

Dates
- Royal assent: 16 March 2016
- Commencement: Various (Note: Section 19.)
Other legislation
Amends	Education and Inspections Act 2006Education Act 2011; Academies Act 2010

Status: Amended

History of passage through Parliament

Text of statute as originally enacted

Revised text of statute as amended

The Education and Adoption Act 2016 (c. 6) is an act of the Parliament of the United Kingdom giving the government new powers to intervene more rapidly in schools rated by Ofsted as "inadequate" or "coasting" and speed up the process of converting failing comprehensive schools into academies. The bill was presented to the House of Commons on 3 June 2015 by Nicky Morgan the Secretary of State for Education.

The measures in the act are also designed to speed up the adoption process by the Secretary of State requiring local authorities to make arrangements for their adoption functions (recruitment, assessment and approval) to be carried out by another adoption agency.

The act makes amendments to the Education Act 2011, Academies Act 2010, Education and Inspections Act 2006.

The bill started in the House of Commons, which passed to the House of Lords, and then received royal assent.
