= Technology College (United Kingdom specialist schools programme) =

Specialist secondary school in the UK

Technology Colleges logo

In the United Kingdom, a Technology College was part of the 2011-defunct specialist schools programme (SSP) in the United Kingdom. It was a specialist school that specialises in design and technology, mathematics and science. Beginning in 1994, they were the first specialist schools that were not CTC colleges. In 2008, there were 598 Technology Colleges in England, of which 12 also specialised in another subject.

== History ==
The Education Reform Act 1988 made technology mandatory, however the Conservative government were unable to afford the cost of funding schools to teach the subject. A first attempt at developing specialist schools to solve this issue, the City Technology College (CTC) programme between 1988 and 1993, had produced only 15 schools, despite an initial aim of 200. In response, Cyril Taylor, chairman of the City Technology Colleges Trust, proposed to allow pre-existing schools to become specialists in technology (CTCs were newly opened schools). This was expected to mitigate the programme's failure and allow the government to gradually pay for the subject of technology. The Major government launched the £25 million Technology Schools Initiative (TSI) afterwards. From 1991, secondary schools were granted additional funds as a reward for specialising in technology in order to improve the curricular provision of technical education. 89 local education authorities applied to join the TSI, with a number of schools individually applying in authorities that chose not to take part. Some authorities, namely those run by the Labour Party, refused to participate on political grounds (Labour had opposed technology schools). 222 schools had specialised in technology by 1993 (not including CTCs), with government plans to have these schools collaborate and share their resources with other secondaries.

The Conservative manifesto for the 1992 general election promised to "expand the initiative across the country", with the July 1992 education white paper Choice and Diversity: A new framework for schools reinforcing the initiative's goal of encouraging schools to specialise in technology after the Conservatives' victory. However, the focus was no longer on improving technical education. Instead the focus drifted to increasing diversity in the school system. In the same year, another education white paper Technology colleges: schools for the future was released. Like technology schools, new Technology Colleges specialising in mathematics, technology and science were to be established from already existing secondary schools in hopes of furthering the CTC programme's impact and adding diversity to the school system. The Technology Colleges programme was launched in 1993, allowing schools with voluntary aided and grant-maintained status to apply for Technology College status after raising £100,000 in private sponsorship. The first successful applicants were then designated with this status in 1994. The TSI was scrapped and the programme was opened up to all other state schools in November 1994. The programme evolved into the specialist schools programme.

The specialist schools programme's funding was mainstreamed in April 2011. Consequently, non-academy schools no longer need to designate and re-designate for Technology College status, but also no longer receive government grants for using the status. They must now dedicate part of the Dedicated Schools Grant to maintain the status' specialisms. Academy schools could already attain the status freely, without requiring designation.
