= School website =

Website maintained by or for a school

A school website is a website built, designed, and maintained by a school. In some jurisdictions, there is a statutory requirement for schools to publish certain information online, on their website, or elsewhere.

== Overview ==
School website software is a specialised form of a content management system (CMS) hosted on a computer connected to the internet. When it has been accepted, the client (the school) is responsible for maintaining the content; adding new content and changing elements of the visual design.

== Legal ==
The principal legislation in the United Kingdom for state schools and private, or independent, schools was the Education and Inspections Act 2006 and its amendments and regulations, such as the School Information Regulations 2012 and the School Information (England) (Amendment) Regulations 2016.

The General Data Protection Regulation has applied since 2018, and before that the Data Protection Act and its successor Data Protection Act 2018.

A maintained school in England must display certain information online. As of 2020 this included:

- School contact details
- Admission arrangements
- Ofsted reports
- Exam and assessment results
- Performance tables
- Curriculum
- Behaviour policy
- School complaints procedure
- Pupil premium
- Year 7 literacy and numeracy catch-up premium
- PE and sport premium for primary schools
- Special educational needs (SEN) and disability information
- Careers programme information
- Equality objectives
- Governors’ information and duties
- Charging and remissions policies
- Values and ethos
- Requests for paper copies

Ofsted monitors the contents of school websites, and should items be missing an inspection could be triggered. All establishments in England must register with the Department for Education. They are given an URN (Universal Recognition Number) and will be inspected by Ofsted. Private schools have greater freedom in how they teach but they still are required to have a website that complies, though the content required will differ from that of a state school or an academy.
