= City learning centre =

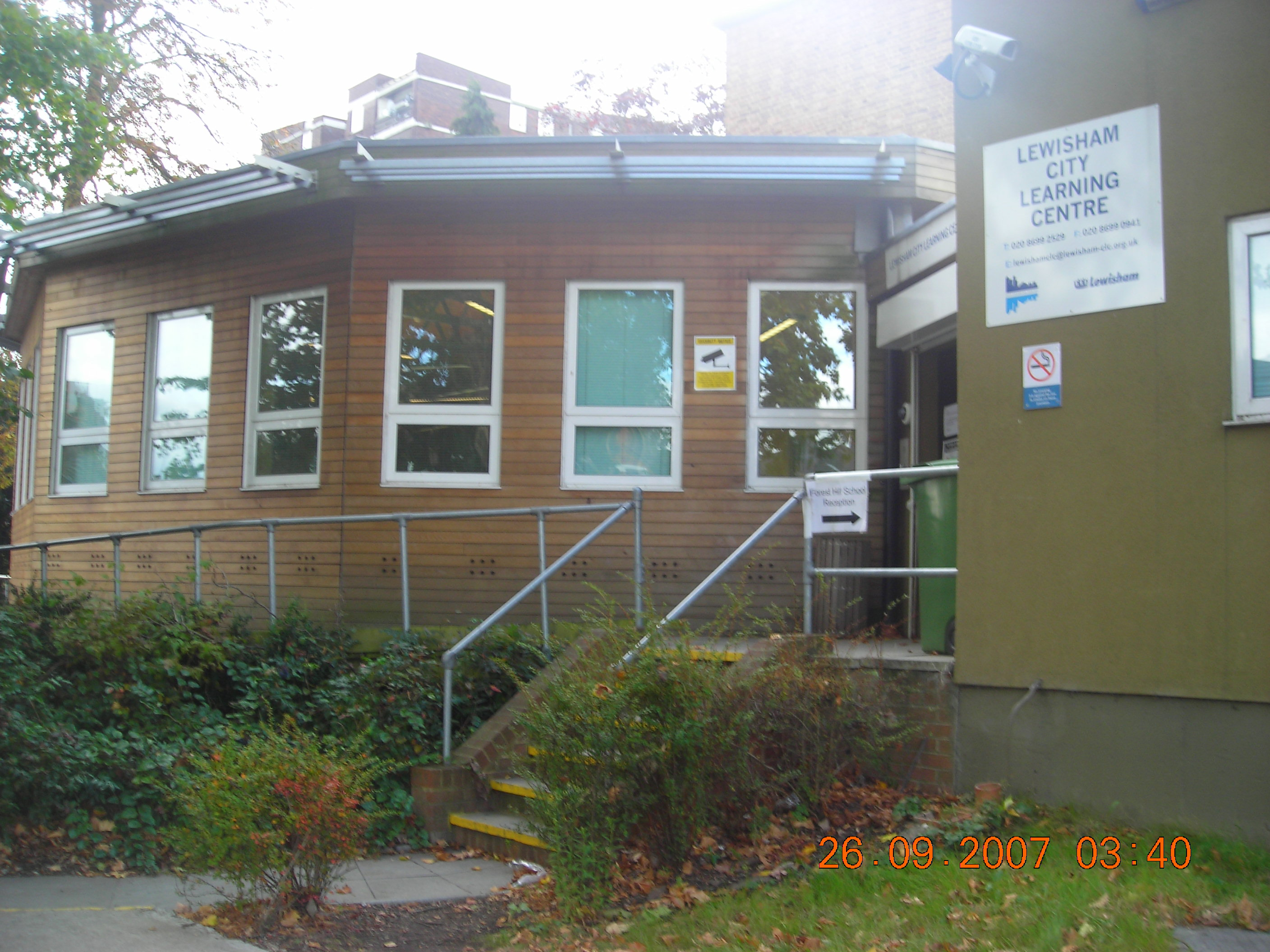
A City Learning Centre in Lewisham

A City Learning Centre (CLC) is a facility in the United Kingdom which provides ICT-based learning opportunities for the pupils at the host school, for pupils at a network of surrounding schools and for the wider community. The centre aims to enhance learning across the whole curriculum by providing courses and opportunities for individual pupils from schools around the area. The multimedia establishments cater to any age and level of ICT understanding, and some offer conferencing facilities which are pre-bookable by local businesses.

== Growth ==
The number of established City Learning Centres in England exceeded 100, and steadily grew since their introduction in 2001. Many City Learning Centres are established on the same ground as an existing school (for example, South Sefton City Learning Centre was established on the grounds of Savio High School).

== Funding ==
City Learning Centres were heavily funded by the British Government through the Excellence in Cities programme to ensure they were able to cater for the requirements of local schools and businesses within the area, with an emphasis on enhancing opportunities in disadvantaged areas. Up to £1.2 million of Revenue Funding per CLC was available for capital and initial start-up costs, plus recurring funding of £220,000 per annum.

After their first year of operation, an additional £150,000 was available for Capital Redevelopment Funding to ensure their technology remains at the forefront. However, unlike revenue funding, it was only released from the first full financial year that a CLC was fully operational, requiring that a Centre must be open before 31 March to trigger funding in the following financial year. This was limited to building and structure work, computer hardware and software, but not the funding required for subscriptions for such software. It should not be used to pay for consumables, staffing costs or other non-CLC purposes. In addition, this money must be spent on the Centre and not simply shared out among its partner schools, unless it is to improve connectivity between a Centre and partner schools.

Funding for CLCs was completely abolished when the coalition government came into power in May 2010. The majority of CLCs have closed leaving some still operating. City Learning Centre's now generate income directly from schools, local authorities, others work with businesses or a combination of all of these.

== Usage ==
The Centres are there for schools to use and to come up with interesting, innovative and replicable lesson plans, extra curricular activities and to discover new ways of using technology in the classroom. An important reason for using the Centres, as well as spreading technology more widely, is that it encourages schools to work more co-operatively with each other, sharing ideas as they share resources. It means the Centres are able to be equipped with more specialist technology that would otherwise be cost-effective for individual schools, and will be a 'draw' for pupils and the community as a place to experience the latest technology, as well as meet and exchange ideas. In cases where transport is difficult (or for times when getting to the Centre isn't practical), schools will be able to access the Centres' resources remotely through a 'hub and spoke' arrangement.

== Activities ==
City Learning Centres offer a wide range of activities and facilities to the pupils in the surrounding area. Some of the facilities or available activities include:

- Use of computer facilities not available in schools.
- Use of expertise in teaching and learning not available in schools.
- Use of professional Apple Macs for activities such as video editing.
- Use of specialist video editing equipment and software.
- Facilities to print large scale industrial-size printing.
- School radio stations.
- Consultancy on the use of a range of technologies within the curriculum.
- Expertise in the use of mobile devices such as the iPad in teaching and learning.

== See also ==
- Excellence in Cities
- Education in England
