= Music College (United Kingdom specialist schools programme) =

Type of British specialist school

Music Colleges logo

Music Colleges were introduced in 2004 as part of the specialist schools programme in England. The system enables secondary schools to specialise in certain fields, in this case, music. Schools that successfully applied to the Specialist Schools Trust and became Music Colleges would receive extra funding from this joint private sector and government scheme. Music Colleges act as a local point of reference for other schools and businesses in the area, with an emphasis on promoting music within the community. Since the 2011 discontinuation of the Specialist Programme, schools must become an academy or manage a Dedicated Schools Grant if they wish to become a Music College.
