= Language College (United Kingdom specialist schools programme) =

Type of secondary school in the United Kingdom

Language Colleges logo

Language Colleges were introduced in 1995 as part of the 2011-defunct specialist schools programme (SSP) in the United Kingdom. The system enabled secondary schools to specialise in certain fields, in this case, modern foreign languages. Schools that successfully applied to the Specialist Schools Trust and became Language Colleges received extra funding for language teaching from this joint private sector and government scheme. Language Colleges act as a local point of reference for other schools and businesses in the area, with an emphasis on promoting languages within the community. They are also encouraged to develop links with schools and other institutions in foreign countries. There were 216 Language Colleges in the country by 2010.

The specialist schools programme was discontinued by the Conservative-Liberal Democrat coalition government in April 2011. Since then schools can become Language Colleges either through academisation or through the Dedicated Schools Grant.

== LC-SE project ==
The LC-SE project was a joint Franco-British educational programme conducted by the SST, DfES, French Ministry of Education and the Centre International d'Études Pédagogiques (CIEP). Specialist schools, usually Language Colleges, formed partnerships with European section schools in France. The project began in 2001 when French Minister of Education, Jack Lang, met with the SST. Partnerships between 100 Language Colleges and Lycées soon followed. Specialist Science Colleges were invited to join the project in 2006 and by 2007 all other SSP schools could take part.
