= David Hargreaves (academic) =

British academic

David Hargreaves FAcSS (born 1939) was educated at Bolton School and Christ's College, Cambridge. He was Associate Director for Development and Research of the Specialist Schools and Academies Trust (SSAT). He is a Fellow Emeritus of Wolfson College, Cambridge and was a Foundation Academician of the Academy of the Social Sciences.

He has been Chairman of the British Educational Communications and Technology Agency (BECTA), Chief Inspector of the Inner London Education Authority and Chief Executive of the Qualifications and Curriculum Authority (QCA). He has held academic posts in teacher education at the University of Manchester, the University of Oxford (where he was Reader in Education and a Fellow of Jesus College from 1979 to 1984) and the University of Cambridge and is visiting professor of education at the University of Manchester. He is the author of several books on educational theory and was a Senior Associate of the think tank Demos.
