= School profile =

Statutory requirement of schools in England

A school profile was a document which was required to be produced by most maintained schools in England, under the provisions of the Education Act 2005.

The profile replaced the requirement for school governors to produce an Annual Report to Parents. The profile was, in part, pre-populated with data provided by the Department for Children, Schools and Families and its agencies, including the Office for Standards in Education. This data included standard information such as number of pupils and school type, and a summary of school performance in National Curriculum assessments.

In addition, schools and their governors were required to compile sections of the profile in answer to the questions as follows:

- What have been our successes this year?
- What are we trying to improve?
- How have our results changed over time?
- How are we making sure that every child receives teaching to meet their individual needs?
- How do we make sure our pupils are healthy, safe and well-supported?
- What have we done in response to our Ofsted report?
- How are we working with parents and the community?

School Profiles were required to be produced by all maintained schools in England, except for maintained nursery schools. Other school types were not required to produce a profile, although could elect to do so. The profile should have been produced at least once in each academic year.

The Education Act 2011, one of the early acts of Parliament of the Coalition government, abolished the School Profile, and was put into effect on 1 February 2012.

== Freedom of Information response ==
In 2010, the Department for Education announced in a Freedom of Information request that less than quarter of schools had actually published their School Profile in the previous academic year.
