= Arts College (United Kingdom specialist schools programme) =

Type of school in the United Kingdom

Arts Colleges logo

An Arts College, in the United Kingdom, was part of the 2011-defunct Specialist Schools Programme. It specialises in the subject fields of the performing, visual, digital and/or media arts. They were announced in 1996 and introduced alongside Sports Colleges to England in 1997, being one of the five "practical specialisms" of the specialist schools programme. They were then introduced to Scotland in 2005 and Northern Ireland in 2006. By 2011, when the programme ended, there were over 491 Arts Colleges in England. More have been introduced since then, however schools must be an academy, free school or use the Dedicated Schools Grant to become one.

Arts Colleges are entitled by the School Standards and Framework Act 1998 to select 10% of its yearly pupil intake based on academic aptitude, however this partial selection is optional.

Arts Colleges act as a local point of reference for other schools and businesses in the area, with an emphasis on promoting art within the community.

== History ==
Arts Colleges were introduced in 1997 as part of the now defunct specialist schools programme in the United Kingdom. The system enabled secondary and primary schools to specialise in certain fields, in this case, the performing, visual and/or media arts. After Arts Colleges were introduced to Northern Ireland, an additional digital specialism was made available. Schools that successfully applied to the Specialist Schools Trust and became Arts Colleges received extra funding from this joint private sector and government scheme.

The specialist schools programme was discontinued by the Conservative-Liberal Democrat coalition government in April 2011. Since then schools can become Arts Colleges either through academisation or through the Dedicated Schools Grant.

== Sponsors ==
Under the specialist schools programme, schools that wished to specialise had to raise £100,000 (later £50,000) in a private sponsorship bid. Many individuals and organisations supported schools wishing to achieve Arts College status. Film producer, educator and adviser to the Blair government, Lord David Puttnam, often supported bids for Arts College status and still calls on schools to expand arts provision in their curriculum. Arts Council England supported English schools that were designating as Arts Colleges. The Specialist Schools and Academies Trust, deliverer of the specialist schools programme, also supported schools who wished to receive Arts College status, extending this support to designated Arts Colleges seeking re-designation.
