= Club Doncaster Sports Village =

Multi-purpose stadium in Doncaster, South Yorkshire, England

- Black Bank, The Moat, Keepmoat Stadium, KMS
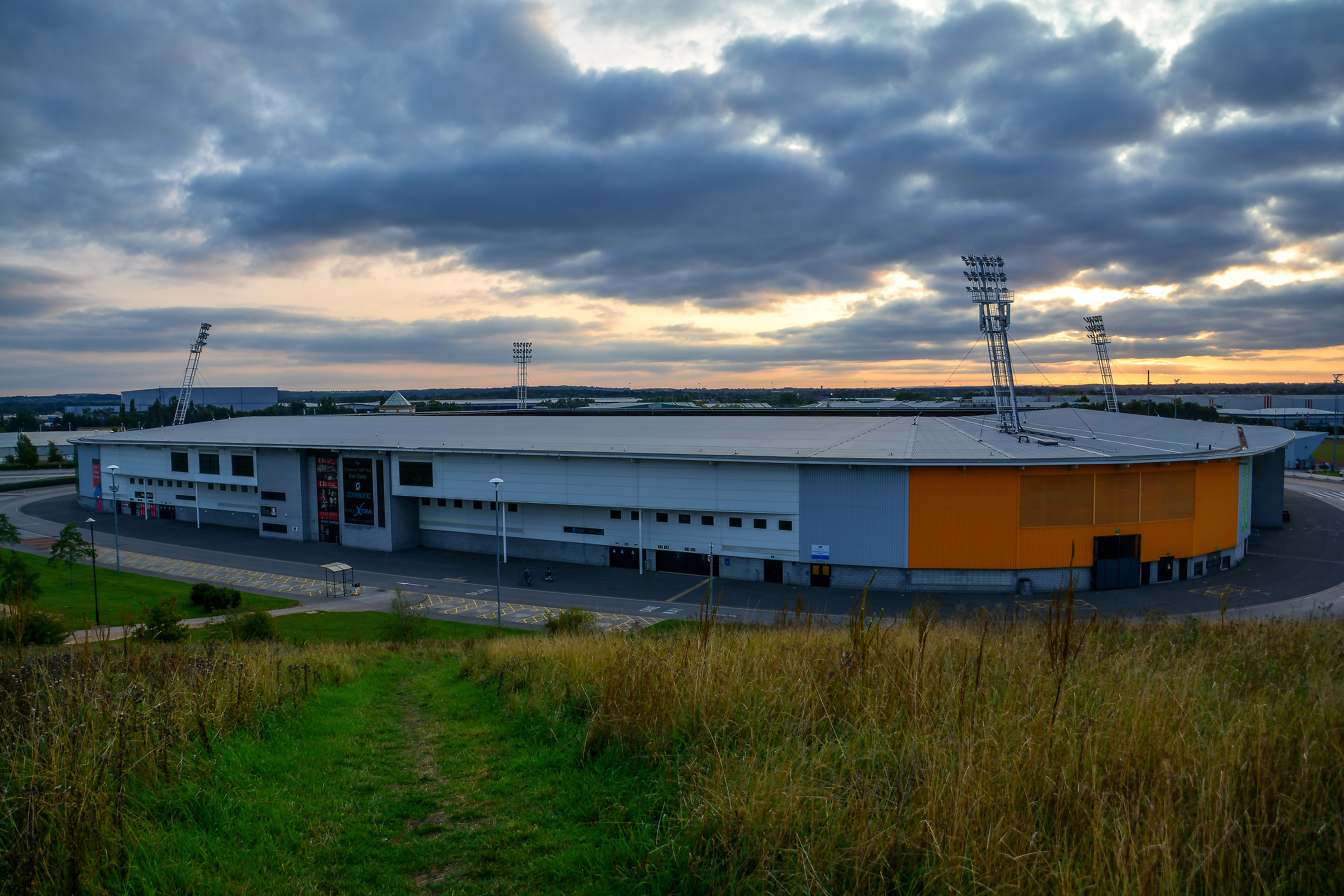
- Interactive map of Club Doncaster Sports Village
- Full name: Club Doncaster Sports Village
- Former names: Keepmoat (November 2006–December 2021) Doncaster Community Stadium (Planning Permission) Eco-Power Stadium (December 2021–May 2026)
- Location: Stadium Way, Lakeside, Doncaster, South Yorkshire, England DN4 5JW
- Coordinates: 53°30′35″N 1°6′50″W
- Owner: Doncaster Rovers Football Club
- Operator: Doncaster Rovers Football Club
- Capacity: 15,231
- Surface: Desso GrassMaster
- Record attendance: 15,001 v Leeds United (1 April 2008)

Construction
- Built: 2006
- Opened: 3 August 2007; 19 years ago

Tenants
- Football; Doncaster Rovers (2007–present); Doncaster Rovers Belles (2007–present); Harrogate Town (2020); Rugby League; Doncaster R.L.F.C. (2007–present); Sheffield Eagles (2015, 2021)

The Club Doncaster Sports Village (formerly known as Keepmoat Stadium, and Eco-Power Stadium) is a multi-purpose stadium in Doncaster, England, with a capacity of 15,231. It cost approximately £20 million to construct, as part of the wider Lakeside Sports Complex that it resides within which in total cost approximately £32 million, and is used by Doncaster Rovers, Doncaster Rugby League Club and Doncaster Rovers Belles Ladies Football Club.

== Facilities ==
=== Stands ===
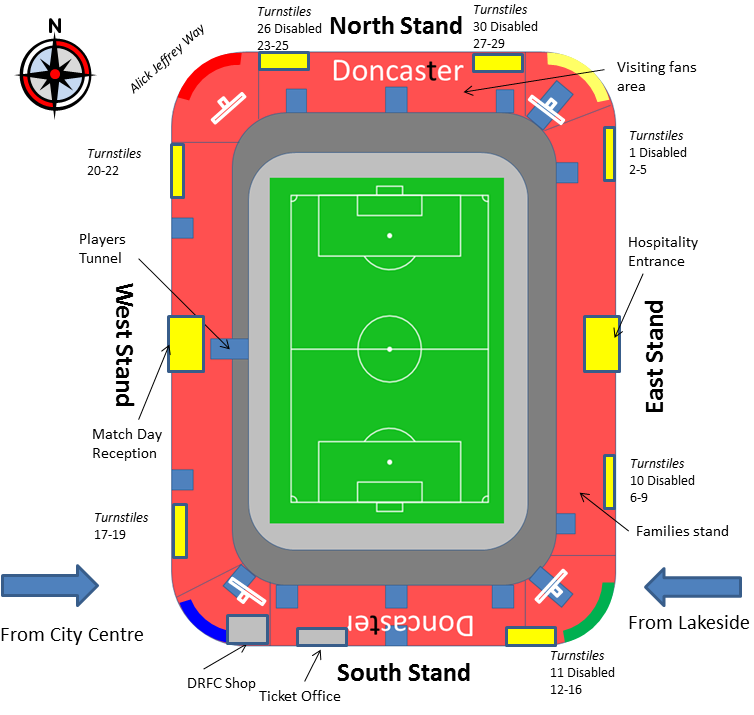
Stadium seating area layout

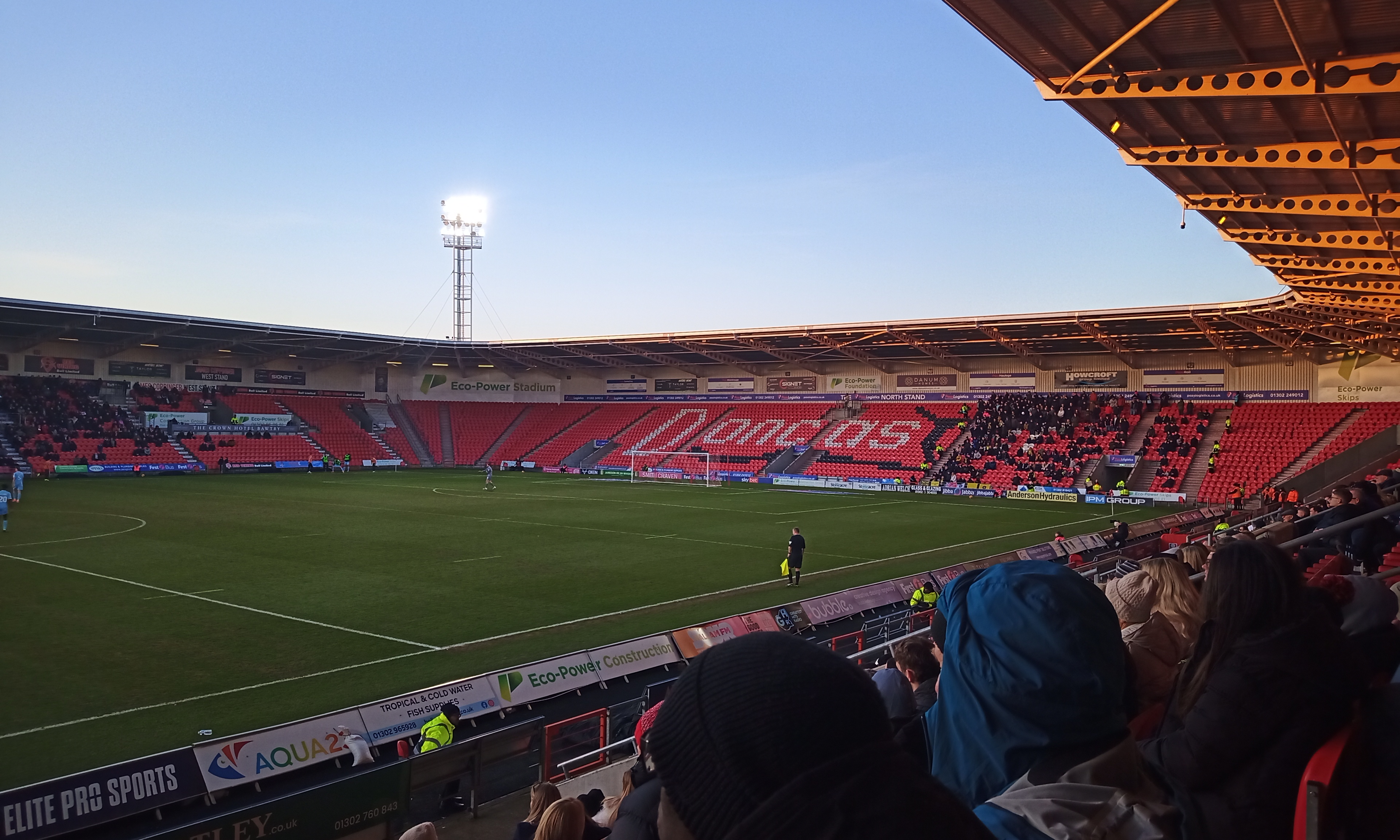
Keepmoat Stadium interior

==== East Stand ====
The East Stand is sponsored by Donasonic. The area of the East Stand towards the South East corner is the Families area sponsored by First Bus Ltd. and is known as the "First" Families Stand.

==== West Stand ====
This is the main match-day reception area with the stand sponsored by Red Viking Rail, and is known as the "James Coppinger West Stand", after former Doncaster Rovers player James Coppinger.

==== South Stand ====
The South Stand, popularly known as the Black Bank, is sponsored by Polypipe. For Doncaster Rovers matches this is the stand that houses the Black Bank (the ultras group of Doncaster Rovers supporters) and is decorated with flags and banners on match days, known for trying to create an atmosphere.

==== North Stand ====
The North Stand is sponsored by Pass Logistics The North Stand area closest to the East Stand is the usual location of visiting fans. Depending on the numbers of visitors, the availability of seats in this area are expanded westwards to meet demand.

==== Capacity ====
The all-seater stadium holds 15,231 spectators, 5,000 more than Belle Vue, with improved legroom and disabled access. Amongst the facilities in the new stadium is a new fans' bar, created to ensure fans have a place where they can enjoy pre-match drinks.

The pitch itself incorporates a system of synthetic fibres interwoven with natural grass. This helps to maintain the pitch's integrity and prevents the playing surface from deteriorating throughout the course of the season. The pitch however does not have an under-soil heating system in-place, despite being a modern construction. This has resulted in the postponement of a match within the first year of full operation.

==== Adjoining sports complex facilities and stadia ====
A mini-stadium is situated beside the main stadium, featuring a six-lane running track and a 500-seat stand. The mini stadium is used by Doncaster Rovers Belles, Doncaster Rovers Reserves, Doncaster Athletics Club, Doncaster RLFC's academy team, and the Doncaster Mustangs American football team.

== Sports ==
=== Football ===
The first game played by Doncaster Rovers in the new stadium was on 1 January 2007 against Huddersfield Town, whom they beat 3–0. The game also saw the first three red cards in the new stadium. Doncaster Rovers' centre forward Mark McCammon was the first player ever to score on the new pitch.

Doncaster's first loss at the stadium came five days later at the hands of Bolton Wanderers when they defeated the Rovers 4–0 in the 3rd Round of the FA Cup.

On 14 January 2007, Doncaster Rovers Belles' first match in the main stadium resulted in a 5–2 defeat to Leeds United, before a crowd of 1,797. Vicky Exley was the first Belle to score on the new pitch. The official opening of the Keepmoat Stadium was on 3 August 2007, with Doncaster Rovers playing a Manchester United XI in front of a crowd of 13,080. United won the game 2–0.

On 19 June 2012, it was confirmed that Doncaster Rovers had secured a 99-year operating lease from Doncaster Metropolitan Borough Council to lead the management of the stadium with a view to improving operating results across the stadium sports partnership.

The stadium hosted the final of the 2012–13 FA Women's Cup.

The highest ever attendance at the Keepmoat stadium was 15,001 for the visit of Leeds United. Rovers also achieved attendances of over 14,800 at the Keepmoat Stadium in games against Sheffield Wednesday and Newcastle United.

On 3 March 2010, it hosted England's under-21s 2011 UEFA European Under-21 Championship qualification Group 9 match against Greece's under-21s. The hosts lost 2–1 with the visitors goals coming from Kyriakos Papadopoulos on the 28th minute and Yiannis Papadopoulos on the 49th minute while Nathan Delfouneso scored for the hosts on the 80th minute.

Since the EFL require all matches to be played on grass pitches, the stadium was used for all of Harrogate Town's matches for the first month of their 2020–21 season whilst the club replaced their synthetic pitch at Wetherby Road.

On 30 November 2021, England's women's team hosted Latvia's women's team at the stadium, beating them by a record margin of 20–0.

=== Rugby league ===
The opening game played by Doncaster in the new stadium was against Sheffield Eagles, to whom they lost 16–10 in front of 5,400 spectators. Sheffield Eagles' (and former Dons') Richard Newlove was the first player to score try at the new stadium.

On Sunday 27 July 2008, the stadium hosted a semi-final of the Rugby League Challenge Cup between Hull F.C. and Wakefield Trinity. Hull beat Trinity 32–24 in front of a crowd of 14,716.

The stadium hosted the opening match of the 2009 Gillette 4 Nations on Friday 23 October between co-hosts England and France attracting a crowd of 11,529.

The stadium hosted the semi-final of the Rugby League Challenge Cup between Castleford and Leeds on Sunday 7 August 2011, Leeds winning 10–8 in front of 13,158 fans; another Challenge Cup Semi-Final between Hull F.C. and Wigan took place at the stadium on 29 July 2016, Hull running out 16–12 winners. Wigan would return to the stadium for the first semi-final of the 2024 Challenge Cup against Hull Kingston Rovers, taking place on 18 May 2024.

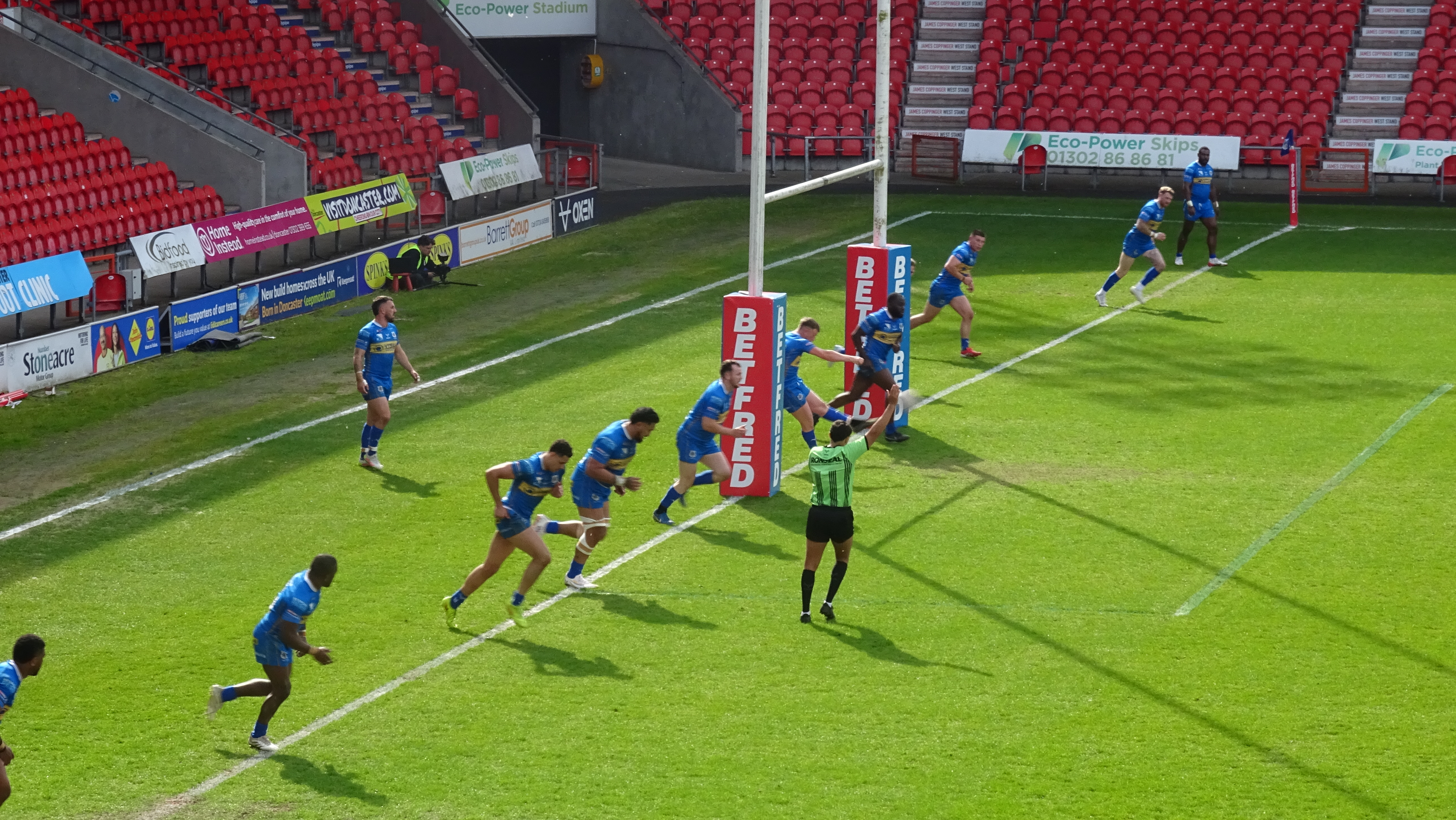
Doncaster RLFC kicking out from underneath their sticks in 2026

The Dons local rivals, Sheffield Eagles, used the stadium as their temporary home during the 2015 rugby league season.

In 2021, the stadium played host to three group games of the 2021 Rugby League World Cup.

==== Rugby league test matches ====
Date	Winners	Result	Runners-up	Attendance	Part of
23 October 2009	England	34–12	France	11,529	2009 Rugby League Four Nations
17 October 2022	France	34–12	Greece		2021 Men's Rugby League World Cup
23 October 2022	Samoa	72–4	Greece		2021 Men's Rugby League World Cup
31 October 2022	Papua New Guinea	36–0	Wales		2021 Men's Rugby League World Cup

== Music ==
There have also been a variety of concerts held in the stadium, including two in July 2007 featuring Ronan Keating, Bryan Adams and McFly. In July 2008 there was also a show by Sir Elton John and his band. On 30 July 2011, Irish vocal pop band Westlife held a concert for Gravity Tour supporting their album Gravity. In 2017, Doncaster born singer Louis Tomlinson filmed part of the music video for his hit single, Back to You, featuring Bebe Rexha, in the stadium. The Killers were set to play the stadium in May 2020, but the date was postponed to May 2022 as a result of the COVID-19 pandemic.

== Other events ==
In September 2008, the stadium was used to host the BAFL (British American Football League) finals known as "Britbowl". In mid June 2009 opened its facilities to accommodate corporate events and private functions, the first of which being the marriage reception of Wesley and Claire Vaughan, June 2009. In November 2010, darts superstar Dennis Priestley held a darts exhibition at the stadium. On 11 May 2013, an IBF Bantamweight World Title boxing match between Jamie McDonnell and Julio Ceja took place at the stadium, with McDonnell the winner. On 27 July 2013, an MMA event hosted by UCFC has held at the stadium, the main event was between Ian Freeman and Ricco Rodriguez. On 28 April 2016 it was announced that Rugby Union team Doncaster Knights would use the Keepmoat for a maximum of six games the following season if they were to win promotion to Premiership Rugby. This would allow work to be undertaken on their home ground of Castle Park in order to bring it up to at least the minimum seating capacity of 10,000 required by the RFU and the Professional Game Board (PGB) for a premiership venue. However, the Doncaster Knights did not achieve promotion that season.

== Naming rights ==
When construction began on the stadium, a planning permission application was made under the name "Doncaster Community Stadium" with many people speculating that this would be the official name.

However, prior to the stadium's opening, Keepmoat Homes, was unveiled as the stadium's first sponsor. Keepmoat Homes would go on to sponsor the stadium for the first 15 years spanning between November 2006 and December 2021.

On 14 December 2021, Doncaster based construction company Eco-Power was announced as the new naming rights holder, taking effect from 27 December 2021. In 2024 Eco-Power said that they were scaling back their sponsorship commitments, but would continue to sponsor the ground for the 2024/25 campaign while the club looked for a new naming sponsor.

On 19 May 2026, it was announced that the stadium would be renamed as the "Club Doncaster Sports Village", with the new name expected to come force from 30 June 2026.

== Awards ==
At the Stadium Business Awards 2010, the stadium received the award for Best Matchday Experience.

== See also ==
- Belle Vue, Doncaster Rovers' former home.
- XP School
- Lists of stadiums
- List of football stadiums in England
