= School Standards and Framework Act 1998 =

Act of the Parliament of the United Kingdom

School Standards and Framework Act 1998 (Note: Section 145(1).)
- Act of Parliament
- Parliament of the United Kingdom
- Long title: An Act to make new provision with respect to school education and the provision of nursery education otherwise than at school; to enable arrangements to be made for the provision of further education for young persons partly at schools and partly at further education institutions; to make provision with respect to the Education Assets Board; and for connected purposes.
- Citation: 1998 c. 31
- Introduced by: David Blunkett, Secretary of State for Education and Skills (Commons)
- Territorial extent: England and Wales; Scotland (in part); Northern Ireland (in part); (Note: Section 145(6)–(8).)

Dates
- Royal assent: 24 July 1998
- Commencement: Various (Note: Section 145(2)–(5).)
Other legislation
Amends	London Government Act 1963; House of Commons Disqualification Act 1975; Further and Higher Education Act 1992; Value Added Tax Act 1994; Education Act 1994; Employment Rights Act 1996; Education Act 1996
Amended by	Employment Relations Act 1999; Land Registration Act 2002; Statute Law (Repeals) Act 2004; Education and Inspections Act 2006; National Health Service (Consequential Provisions) Act 2006; Education and Skills Act 2008; Academies Act 2010; Charities Act 2011; Elections and Elected Bodies (Wales) Act 2024

Status: Amended

Text of statute as originally enacted

Revised text of statute as amended

The School Standards and Framework Act 1998 (c. 31) is an act of the Parliament of the United Kingdom. The act was major education legislation passed by the incoming Labour government led by Tony Blair.This act:

- imposed a limit of 30 on infant class sizes.
- abolished grant-maintained schools, introducing foundation status.
- provided for a schedule of fully selective state schools (grammar schools), and set up a procedure by which local communities could vote for their abolition. No grammar schools have yet been abolished using this mechanism.
- prohibited the expansion of partial selection but allowed some specialist schools to admit 10% of pupils based on aptitude in their subject specialisms.
- introduced super headteachers and Education Action Zones.
- introduced an Admissions Code and the office of Schools Adjudicator to enforce this Code and consider objections to admission arrangements.
- introduced a right of appeal against the refusal of an admission authority to offer an applicant child a place at the relevant school.
- expanded on the requirement that "each pupil in attendance at a community, foundation or voluntary school shall on each school day take part in an act of collective worship" of a “wholly or mainly of a broadly Christian character” for community schools.
- created the local School Organisation Committee to decide school organisation proposals (opening, merging, closing) and responsible for approving the local School Organisation Plan. The School Organisation Committee consisted of five voting groups:

1. LEA, made up of elected members
2. Church of England
3. Catholic Church
4. Learning and Skills Council (often only vote on decisions affecting 16+ education)
5. schools, by serving governors.

- banned corporal punishment in all schools.

== See also ==
- Education Reform Act 1988
- Education Act 1944
