= Synergy School Radio =

- Industry: Broadcasting, Education
- Founded: (2001) developed as part of Clyde Broadcast Products Limited
- Headquarters: Clydebank, Scotland. Neighbouring Glasgow
- Area served: UK
- Key people: Brian Rowan Darren Dixie Nigel Vernon Dier
- Website: www.synergyschoolradio.com

Synergy School Radio is a digital integrated radio studio. Radio is a growing tool within education and is regularly cited for good practice and innovation. School Radio projects have often received significant support from government and education consultants a like advocating the use of School Radio projects as part of good practice.

Synergy were behind the Determined to Broadcast bus. The bus received both support and sponsorship from Synergy but it was also Synergy radio studios that made up the core of the technology being used. The Synergy School Radio project received high-profile support from Radio Clyde's Ross King (presenter) and Gina McKie, XFM Scotland's Heather Suttie and GMTV presenter Jenni Falconer.

Synergy School Radio are associated sponsors of the Sony Award category "Best School Radio station".

In September 2018 the brand was purchased by Clyde Broadcast Technology Limited.

== Education sites using Synergy ==
- Ashmole School
- saltash.net
- University of Derby
- Blackpool College
- Glasgow Caledonian University
- St. Thomas Aquinas Secondary School, Jordanhill
- Robert Gordon University
- Pulse FM
- Archbishop Ilsley Catholic School
- Cardinal Wiseman Catholic School, Birmingham
- Westminster Academy (London)
- Reid Kerr College
- West Exe Technology College
