= XP School =

Coordinates: 53.5122°N 1.1188°W

Location
- Middle Bank; Doncaster, South Yorkshire, DN4 5NG; England

Information
- Type: Free school
- Established: 1 September 2014
- Local authority: Doncaster
- Trust: XP School Trust Limited
- Department for Education URN: 140964 Tables
- Ofsted: Reports
- Head teacher: Claira Salter
- Gender: Coeducational
- Age: 11 to 19
- Enrolment: 245 (July 2024)
- Capacity: 250
- Website: xpschool.org

XP School is a coeducational secondary school and sixth form located in Doncaster, South Yorkshire, England. The school serves around 250 pupils, ages 11–19. The current headteacher is Claira Salter.

XP School was co-founded by current CEO Gwyn ap Harri & CAO Andy Sprakes who were inspired by education institutions such as High Tech High in the United States. Gwyn ap Harri is also the CEO of education software company realsmart.

It bases its practices on the High Tech High charter schools and expeditionary learning schools in the United States. XP students complete cross-subject expeditions.

The school opened in September 2014, with two classes of 25 year-seven pupils. It opened before the construction of its premises and pupils were initially taught at Doncaster Rovers' Eco-Power Stadium.

In October 2016, it also become the new home of local community radio station Sine FM.

In July 2017, the school was rated as "Outstanding" by Ofsted.

In June 2023 the school was rated as "Good" by Ofsted.
