= Excellence in Cities =

Excellence in Cities

The Excellence in Cities (EiC) programme was launched by the UK's Labour Government in March 1999 to raise standards and promote inclusion in inner cities and other urban areas. Initially targeted at secondary schools, the programme was later expanded to include primary schools, working alongside the Primary National Strategy.

The programme was funded by the government, with £200 million being spent on it in 2001–02, and an additional £300 million in 2002–03. Over 1300 secondary schools and 3600 primary schools in 58 local education authorities were involved in the EiC programme. In summer 2001, the percentage point increase in pupils achieving five GCSEs at A*-C in Excellence in Cities schools was almost double that of schools who weren't in the programme.

The programme tackled underachievement in schools, including the development of Learning Mentors, the development of Learning Support Units, provision for Gifted and Talented pupils and the construction of City Learning Centres. The programme also ran alongside the Leadership Incentive Grant and the Behaviour Improvement Programme. The Excellence Cluster concept was introduced to identify small groups of schools in pockets of deprivation, in both urban and rural areas that would benefit from EiC initiatives.

Research into the Excellence in Cities (EiC) initiative also found that while it had boosted results in Mathematics, it did not improve performance in English and Science of children aged 11 to 14 in Key Stage 3.

== Growth ==
The programme started off covering just 25 local education authorities in September 1999, but gradually expanded that to include many more over the following years.

- September 1999 (first phase): Covered Secondary schools in 25 local education authorities.
- September 2000 (second phase): A further 22 areas joined, along with primary school pilots in Phase One areas.
- September 2001 (third phase): A further 10 areas joined the programme, extending it to more than 1,000 schools - about a third of all secondary-age pupils in the country at the time.

== See also ==
- Education in England
- City Learning Centre
