= Education and Inspections Act 2006 =

Act of the Parliament of the United Kingdom

Education and Inspections Act 2006 (Note: Section 191(1).)
- Act of Parliament
- Parliament of the United Kingdom
- Long title: An Act to make provision about primary, secondary and further education and about training; to make provision about food or drink provided on school premises or in connection with the provision of education or childcare; to provide for the establishment of an Office for Standards in Education, Children's Services and Skills and the appointment of Her Majesty’s Chief Inspector of Education, Children's Services and Skills and make provision about the functions of that Office and that Chief Inspector; to provide for the amendment of references to local education authorities and children's services authorities; to amend section 29 of the Leasehold Reform Act 1967 in relation to university bodies; and for connected purposes.
- Citation: 2006 c. 40
- Introduced by: Ruth Kelly, Secretary of State for Education and Skills (Commons)
- Territorial extent: England and Wales; Scotland (in part); Northern Ireland (in part); (Note: Section 190.)

Dates
- Royal assent: 8 November 2006
- Commencement: Various (Note: Section 188.)
Other legislation
Amends	House of Commons Disqualification Act 1975; Public Passenger Vehicles Act 1981; Further and Higher Education Act 1992; Education Act 1994; Education Act 1996; Public Audit (Wales) Act 2004; Education Act 2005
Amended by	Academies Act 2010; Local Education Authorities and Children’s Services Authorities (Integration of Functions) Order 2010; Education Act 2011; Charities Act 2011; Criminal Justice and Courts Act 2015; Policing and Crime Act 2017
Relates to	School Standards and Framework Act 1998

Status: Amended

History of passage through Parliament

Text of statute as originally enacted

Revised text of statute as amended

The Education and Inspections Act 2006 (c. 40) is an act of the Parliament of the United Kingdom. According to the government the act "is intended to represent a major step forward in the Government’s aim of ensuring that all children in all schools get the education they need to enable them to fulfil their potential".

== Background to the act ==
=== Trust schools white paper ===
In October 2005, the DfES published the White Paper Higher Standards, Better Schools for All — More Choice for Parents and Pupils. It set out plans to "radically improve the system". The blurb distributed with it established a number of key areas that the White Paper was intended to address:

- The challenge to reform
- A school system shaped by parents
- Choice and access for all
- Personalised learning
- Parents driving improvement
- Supporting children and parents
- School discipline
- The school workforce and school leadership
- A new role for local authorities

==== Trust schools ====
One of the most controversial elements in the White Paper was the proposal to establish a new breed of school called a Trust school. The White Paper introduced a new term to the educational taxonomy when it explained how schools would "acquire a Trust". It was noted that there was a remarkable similarity between Trust schools and voluntary aided schools/Foundation schools. The proposals allowed for each Trust school to decide its own governance model from either the VA or Foundation model. Local authority assets - buildings and land - would be transferred to trust ownership, and the trust would take on the responsibility for the employment of all the school staff.

The governance model of VA Schools would allow the Trust to directly appoint more than half of the governors allowing it to effectively control the governing body. Such a model would also reduce the number of elected Parent governors. To tackle this obvious reduction in parent power it was proposed that a new consultative body - a Parents’ Council to ensure that parents have a strong voice in decisions about the way the school is run - although it was stressed that statutory guidance on this would be produced at some yet unspecified later stage. This notion effectively killed any suggestion that Kelly could be seen as a champion of parents.

The Trusts were intended to be non-profit making and to have charitable status, although they could be formed by commercial enterprises. In fact one of the early DfES-hosted seminars on the establishment of Trusts included representatives from Microsoft and KPMG. But it was their ability to set their own admission arrangements that generated the most criticism.

== Provisions ==
On 28 February 2006, the bill was finally published. It contained much of what had been trailed, although most notable by its absence was any mention of "Trust school". In reality, Foundation and Voluntary Aided schools will pick up the mantle of "Trust school".

The Act is designed to give greater freedoms schools, including the possibility of:

- Owning their own assets
- Employing their own staff
- Setting their own admissions arrangements

Other provisions include:

- Creation of a Local Authority duty to promote fair access to educational opportunities
- Giving schools staff a clear statutory right to discipline students
- By law, all state (not private) schools must have a behaviour policy in place that includes measures to prevent all forms of bullying among pupils. This policy is decided by the school. All teachers, pupils and parents must be told what it is.
- Provisions relating to nutritional standards of school food
- Reform of the school inspectorates
- Allowing sixth formers in maintained mainstream schools the right to withdraw themselves from collective worship. (This was commenced in England in 2007 and Wales in 2009.)
- Creation of admissions forums to scrutinise what is happening at a local level and will report on whether schools are following the code of practice on admissions or not, and to monitor the treatment of special needs children, children on free school meals, and ethnic minority groups

== Reception ==
The white paper was not received with universal acclaim. A large number of Labour backbenchers, as well as numerous Labour luminaries like Neil Kinnock and former Education Secretary Estelle Morris, made known their opposition to the proposals and published an alternative white paper. Faced with such a rebellion, the government initially stressed that it would press on with the reforms. Tory leader David Cameron then announced that these reforms were in line with Tory policies and that he would support the bill if presented in the proposed form. The government were faced with the prospect of pushing through their reforms only with opposition support and in the face of increased resistance from its own supporters.

Following a report by the Education Select Committee - which was in itself controversial - Ruth Kelly finally wrote to the committee chairman Barry Sheerman in February 2006, outlining how the bill would look when presented to parliament and stressing how it would accommodate many of the fears expressed in the committee's report. This was reported as the government backtracking on many key issues although it stressed that it was not a climbdown.

The legislation was criticised by the Children Services Network for not providing admissions forums with "enough teeth".

== See also ==
- Education Act
