= David Jesson =

British statistician

David Frederick St John Jesson (born 23 August 1935) is a British educationalist and a professor in the Department of Economics at the University of York, who studied specialist schools and value-added performance (CVA).

== Early life and career ==
He was born in Hackney in 1935, the son of Frederick John and Florence Jesson, and attended the University of Manchester and the University of Cambridge. He became a Maths teacher, teaching in several schools, state and independent, including Charterhouse School and Lincoln Christ's Hospital School.

Jesson next joined the University of Sheffield, where he developed the contextual value-added system of school performance measurement. This involves looking at the relative improvement of pupils, not their absolute performance, to establish how much 'value' has been 'added'.

In 1995 he joined the University of York as Professor in the Economics department. He worked in the CPERM department, in the Department of Economics and Related studies, under Professor David Mayston. As of December 2021, he is listed as an associate member of York's Centre for Research on Education and Social Justice.

== Research ==
His work on 'value-added' performance came from the belief that working from absolute exam grades was too crude a measurement, as pupils from different backgrounds and schools found it much more of a challenge to gain the same grades as someone from a more privileged background.

=== Science education ===
In 2007 he found that 68% of all comprehensive schools – around 2,020 – did not offer the three separate science courses at GCSE, and that only one in 20 pupils at state schools took physics, chemistry and biology at GCSE.

=== Academically bright children ===
In a report in April 2008 for the Specialist Schools and Academies Trust, he found that academically bright children at comprehensive schools were likely to do better when there were more academically bright children at the same school. This was from data on more than 150,000 children, and involved his 'value-added' measurements. The higher the proportion of 'able' pupils, the better the value-added performance.

In November 2005, he reported at the Birmingham annual conference of the Specialist Schools and Academies Trust (which represented around 2,400 secondary schools) that pupils at private school in the top academic 5% were almost guaranteed to get three A-grades at A-level, yet for state schools only a third of the top 5% would get three A-grades. He called this a 'severe talent drain' in the state school system. In the same speech he said that Britain's future economic success depended on identifying and nurturing this top 5% of pupils.

== Personal life ==
In 1965 he married Catherine Whitehead; they had three children. He lives in St. Ives, Cornwall.
