= Science College (United Kingdom specialist schools programme) =

School program in the United Kingdom

Science Colleges logo

Science Colleges were introduced in 2002 as part of the now defunct Specialist Schools Programme (abolished in 2011) in the United Kingdom. The system enabled secondary schools to specialise in certain fields, in this case, science and mathematics. Schools that successfully applied to the Specialist Schools Trust and became Science Colleges received extra funding from this joint private sector and government scheme. Science Colleges act as a local point of reference for other schools and businesses in the area, with an emphasis on promoting science within the community.

The funding received by such Colleges was dependent on the number of pupils currently attending and was on average approximately £1,600. The funding was often used by schools to upgrade their facilities to a standard befitting a "Specialist" institution. A proportion of the money was used to spread the skills of the school into the local community, often involving outreach centres or adult education schemes. After the Specialist Schools Programme's discontinuation schools can still become Science Colleges through the Dedicated Schools Grant or by becoming an academy.
