= Design technology =

Use of technology for product design

Design technology, or DT, (also Digital Delivery (DD)) is the study, design, development, application, implementation, support and management of computer and non-computer based technologies for the express purpose of communicating product design intent and constructability. Design technology can be applied to the problems encountered in construction, operation and maintenance of a product.

At times there is cross-over between DT and Information Technology, whereas IT is primarily focused on overall network infrastructure, hardware and software requirements, and implementation, DT is specifically focused on supporting, maintaining and training design and engineering applications and tools and working closely with IT to provide necessary infrastructure, for the most effective use of these applications and tools.

Within the building design, construction and maintenance industry (also known as AEC/O/FM), the product is the building and the role of DT, is the effective application of technologies within all phases and aspects of building process. DT processes have adopted Building Information Modeling (BIM) to quicken construction, design and facilities management using technology. So though DT encompasses BIM and Integrated Project Delivery, IPD, it is more overarching in its directive and scope and likewise looks for ways to leverage and more effectively utilize CAD, Virtual Design & Construction, VDC, as well as historical and legacy data and systems.

DT is applicable to industrial design and product design and the manufacturing and fabrication processes therein.

There are formal courses of study in some countries known as design and technology that focus on particular areas. In this case, the above definition remains valid, if for instance one takes the subject textiles technology and replaces the product in the above definition with textile.

== See also ==
- Automation
- Process simulation/Design
- System/Process Engineering/Design
- Computer-aided design (CAD)
- Building Information Modeling (BIM)
- Integrated Project Delivery (IPD)
- Virtual Design and Construction (VDC)
- Information Technology (IT)
