= SSAT (The Schools Network) =

Organisation in the United Kingdom

- Formerly: City Technology Colleges Trust (1987–1996); Technology Colleges Trust (TCT, 1996–2003); Specialist Schools Trust (SST, 2003–2005); Specialist Schools and Academies Trust (SSAT, 2005–2012)
- Company type: Private limited
- Industry: Education
- Founded: 1987; 39 years ago
- Founder: Sir Cyril Taylor
- Headquarters: Islington, London, United Kingdom
- Area served: Europe, North America, Australia, Asia
- Key people: Sue Williamson (Chief Executive and Director)
- Revenue: 91,013,000 pound sterling (2010)
- Number of employees: 544 (2010, 1)
- Divisions: iNet Global Network
- Website: www.ssatuk.co.uk

SSAT (The Schools Network) Limited (branded as SSAT, the Schools, Students and Teachers network) is a UK-based, independent educational membership organisation working with primary, secondary, special and free schools, academies and UTCs. It provides support and training in four main areas: teaching and learning, curriculum, networking, and leadership development.

The company was set up in May 2012, to carry out the business of the previous Specialist Schools and Academies Trust. Based in the UK, SSAT operates worldwide through its international arm, iNet. SSAT has almost 3,000 member schools in England and overseas.

The Chief Executive of SSAT is Sue Williamson, a former headteacher of Monks' Dyke Technology College in Lincolnshire, and former Strategic Director of Leadership, and Innovation at the Specialist Schools and Academies Trust.

== History ==
=== 1986–1996 ===
City Technology Colleges Trust logo

In January 1986, a Centre for Policy Studies meeting was held in the House of Lords. The meeting was organised by Cyril Taylor and focused on the growing issue of unemployment amongst the youth. Among the attendees were Prime Minister Margaret Thatcher, Secretary of State for Employment David Young and 60 other business leaders and politicians. It was decided that around 100 schools would be funded to specialise in technology via direct grants to fulfil business qualifications. The resulting City Technology Colleges (CTC) programme was announced at that year's Conservative Party Conference by Secretary of State for Education and Science Kenneth Baker. CTCs were state specialist schools independent from local authority control, specialising in science and technology. Baker and Thatcher requested that Taylor establish the City Technology Colleges Trust to oversee the establishment of CTCs. Taylor became Baker's adviser and founded the trust in 1987. It was given government grants amounting to, at most, £200,000 by 1991. These grants would fund the trust's efforts in acquiring campuses and attracting potential sponsors for CTCs. The first chief executive, Susan Fey, was appointed in 1988.

In 1990, Susan Fey appointed the trust's six curriculum development directors (CDDs), individuals who would visit CTCs to develop their ethos and curricula and support teacher trainees. The Department for Education and Science granted a sum of £2 million to support their appointment. CDDs influenced the creation of the specialist schools programme and the CTC Trust's affiliation scheme, both of which were first conceptualised in 1992. The affiliation scheme's first meeting was held in December 1992 and was hosted by the BRIT School CTC.

Originally, the target for schools with CTC status was 200, but only 15 could be established over a five-year period. In response, Cyril Taylor proposed the creation of the new specialist Technology College. As a result, in 1992, the Major government released their education white paper Technology colleges: schools for the future. New Technology Colleges specialising in mathematics, technology and science were to be established from already existing secondary schools in hopes of furthering the CTC programme's impact and adding diversity to the school system. The next year's education white paper Choice and Diversity: a New Framework for Schools resulted in the policies implemented by the Education Act 1993. The act allowed secondary schools to specialise in non-core subjects, thus introducing the new Technology Colleges (later specialist schools) programme. The trust was assigned to deliver the programme on behalf of the Department for Education and did so by helping schools raise the required sponsorship bid of £100,000 and then £50,000 for specialist designation.

In 1993, the trust was appointed by Secretary of State for Education John Patten to manage the CTC training scheme. The scheme trained teachers from five CTCs and Technology Colleges and was initially found by education inspectorate Ofsted as "failing". Later inspections reported the scheme as "satisfactory". The trust also had a new chief executive, Kathleen Lund. Lund led the CTC Trust's efforts to cooperate with local authorities from 1994, who had previously opposed the trust due to the CTC and specialist schools programmes (which, in the case of the specialist schools programme, had excluded them until 1994). Specialist schools in language were also introduced at this time.

=== 1996–2002 ===
In 1996 the majority of specialist schools were Technology Colleges; the CTC Trust became the Technology Colleges Trust (TCT) to reflect this fact. The affiliation scheme grew to include 300 schools and Arts and Sports Colleges were introduced. Unlike the other specialist schools, Sports Colleges were instead supported by the Youth Sports Trust. The trust's first annual conference was held, in which Labour's Shadow Secretary of State for Education David Blunkett was a guest. In December the trust's founder and chairman, Cyril Taylor, convinced Labour leader Tony Blair to support the specialist schools programme. Labour were in opposition but were largely expected to win the 1997 general election. Once this had occurred, Blunkett became education secretary. Blunkett pledged to expand the programme in order to modernise the comprehensive system.

In 2000 Professor David Jesson authored a study that compared results at GCSE with the comparative key stage 2 (KS2) primary school data from 1995. The analysis showed a value added score of +5.4 for specialist schools compared with −1.1 for non-specialist schools. For the first time, there was evidence that specialist status was linked to higher results at GCSE, whether it was on the 5+ A*-C measure, value-added or contextual value added. Schools began to make extensive use of the data themselves to evaluate their performance. The study became an annual project and is still provided today, known as Educational Outcomes.

The 2001 Green Paper Schools: Building on success introduced four new specialisms: science, mathematics & computing, business & enterprise and engineering.

The Trust was moving from an organisation which primarily provided bidding advice and support, to an organisation that held a much extended role.

=== 2002–04 ===
In 2002 Charles Clarke succeeded Estelle Morris as Secretary of State for Education, and quickly announced a lifting of the financial cap that had previously limited the number of schools that could be designated in any bidding round. A collaborative rather than a competitive approach would further accelerate the growth of specialist schools, and a new target was set of 2000 specialist schools by 2006.

A second aspect of Clarke's vision for what he termed a 'specialist system' was a more balanced approach to the spread of specialisms in any one area. As many schools struggled to raise the required £50,000 sponsorship, he established a Partnership Fund – a mix of private money (donated by the Garfield Weston Foundation) and public money – to which schools could apply to make up any shortfall.

The effect of lifting the cap on new designations, plus the four new specialisms (as announced in the 2001 Green Paper) was a rapid rise in the number of specialist schools. In 2002 there were 992 specialist schools and by 2004 their number had risen to 1954.

In 2003 a further two new specialisms were announced: humanities and music. An SEN specialism for special schools was announced in 2004. In 2003 the Trust changed its name to the Specialist Schools Trust (SST). The Trust's network of schools continued to grow – the number of schools affiliated passed 1500 in 2002 and reached 2500 in 2004.

A regional structure was established in 2002, to cope with the size of the network. Full-time regional coordinators worked with a committee of volunteer headteachers in their region, setting the local agenda for events and other activities. 2003 saw the establishment of the National Headteachers Steering Group, initially made up of the chairs of each regional steering group. Its task was to steer the Trust's strategy for its services to schools. This was the 'by schools, for schools' model taking shape.

Practitioner-led programmes become more prominent between 2002 and 2004, with leadership programmes beginning with courses for aspirant headteachers and 'developing leaders'.

A major venture of the Trust between 2002 and 2004 was the development of its international arm – International Networking for Educational Transformation – known as iNet. This network grew in response to demand from schools in England and overseas, starting principally in Australia. It exists and flourishes today, with networks in the United States, China, the Netherlands and Wales.

The Leading Edge programme was announced in 2003 as a response to the idea of specialism in school improvement, first proposed by Estelle Morris in 1998. Again a practitioner-led philosophy, many schools had joined the programme by 2004.

Following a challenge from the then Schools Minister David Miliband, the Trust began working with headteachers to define personalising learning. Professor David Hargreaves held a series of workshops with 200 headteachers and identified the nine gateways to personalising learning. A series of five conferences with ASCL (then SHA) followed to examine the gateways. After each conference, Hargreaves produced a pamphlet with case studies from schools. By the time of the last conference in January 2006, the nine gateways had been clustered into four groups: deep learning, deep experience, deep support and deep leadership. The National Conference in 2006 focused on these four topics and consequently a number of schools restructured their leadership teams on this basis.

=== 2005–10 ===
In September 2005 the Trust took on a central role in the government's academies programme. Originally announced by David Blunkett in 2000, its aim was to challenge under-achievement in the country's poorest performing schools. The programme had many similarities to the CTC programme of the early 1990s and required the Trust to change its name again, becoming the Specialist Schools and Academies Trust (SSAT).

By 2008, the structure of the Trust's funding had changed. In 2003/4 the DfES specialist schools grant represented 43% of funding. By 2007/8 it accounted for 24% while 37% came from other commissioned work from the DfES and 35% from commercial income – work won by competitive tender along with affiliation fees and income earned from events, training provision and so on.

=== 2010–12 ===
In May 2010, after a hung parliament, the coalition Government was sworn into office. In September 2010, the government decided to end ring-fencing of grants to schools to fund their specialist status.

Throughout 2010 and 2011, the organisation decreased in size but continued to win contracts overseas. The most notable of these was in Abu Dhabi where, as SSAT Middle East, it continues to operate a network of schools and works with the Abu Dhabi Educational Council.

The trust's contract with the Department for Education to support the sponsored academies programme ended in August 2011 although it continues its links with academy principals and sponsors, and supports schools converting to academy status.

The Trust was now supported primarily by affiliation fees from its thousands of affiliated schools and the delivery of its events and activities. As a result, theTrust changed its name to The Schools Network – reflecting the organisation's new position in education.

Chief Executive Elizabeth Reid left the Network in December 2011 and was replaced by Sue Williamson.

=== 2012 to date ===
In June 2012, after an announcement the previous month that The Schools Network would be going into administration, a management buy-out ensured that a new company, SSAT (The Schools Network) would continue The School Network's work. SSAT purchased parts of the UK operations of the Trust from the administrators and has since traded profitably, delivering education improvement services to schools in the UK.

SSAT (The Schools Network) relocated to Islington, London with around 50 full-time staff. In December 2012, the 20th National Conference was held in Liverpool. The conference saw the launch of Redesigning Schooling, SSAT's campaign to ensure that the future of education is shaped by high quality practice and research within the profession. Conferences were held yearly in 2013, 2014, 2015, 2016 and 2017.

The company now has over 70 full-time staff.

== Redesigning Schooling ==
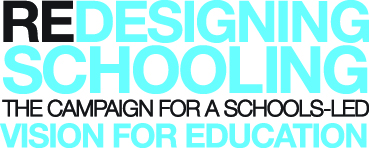

Redesigning Schooling gathered pace in the Spring of 2013 through a series of events in London and Manchester. These events gave delegates an opportunity to engage in lively debate with leading educational thinkers and academics, and to examine much needed change in education from a variety of perspectives. Speakers including Andy Hargreaves, Dylan Wiliam and Tim Oates led workshops that have provided the foundation for a series of publications that have been distributed to SSAT member schools.

== Current work ==
SSAT runs a number of continuous professional development programmes for teachers, and offers support to sponsored academies and schools converting to academy status. It also offers support to schools and academies in the use of data analysis and supports networks of schools and academies across a number of subject areas.

It runs numerous events for teachers and school leaders, including the annual SSAT National Conference.

== International work ==
SSAT supports the iNet network of schools in 34 countries. iNet was established in 2004 and currently includes schools in Wales, China, the United States of America, New Zealand, Mauritius, the United Arab Emirates and South Africa.

In 2006 the trust established the world's first school-based Confucius Institute, in partnership with the Office of Chinese Language Council International (Hanban) the Confucius Institute now has a network of 34 Confucius Classrooms in schools, specialising in the teaching of Mandarin Chinese. This work was sold to the Department for Education in 2011.

In November 2010 the trust signed an agreement with Hanban to train 1,000 teachers of Chinese.

The trust also manages a number of schools in Abu Dhabi.
