= Grant-maintained school =

Former type of school in England and Wales

Grant-maintained schools or GM schools were state schools in England and Wales between 1988 and 1998 that had opted out of local government control, being funded directly by a grant from central government. Some of these schools had selective admissions procedures.

== History ==
Grant-maintained status was created by the Education Reform Act 1988, as part of the programme of the Conservative government to create greater diversity in educational provision and to weaken the influence of local education authorities (LEAs).

GM schools would be owned and managed by their own boards of school governors, rather than the local authority. Proposals to convert to grant-maintained status could be initiated by the governing body or by a number of parents, but would then be determined by a ballot of parents. Skegness Grammar School was the first school to apply for, and to receive, grant-maintained status, whilst Castle Hall School in Mirfield was the first GM school to open.

The Education Act 1993 made it possible for independent schools to convert to grant-maintained status, and for independent sponsors to set up new grant-maintained schools. Schools entering the state sector under these provisions included:

- some Roman Catholic secondary schools, some of which had earlier been direct grant grammar schools: Loreto Grammar School, St. Ambrose College, St Anselm's College, St. Edward's College, St. Joseph's College, Upton Hall School FCJ and Virgo Fidelis Convent Senior School,
- some Jewish and Muslim primary schools, including the Islamia Primary School founded by Yusuf Islam (Cat Stevens).

Grant-maintained schools were allowed to set their own admissions criteria, which were sometimes at variance with those applied by the local education authorities. Some schools successfully applied to become fully selective grammar schools, others introduced partial selection, and some practised selection by interview.

The popularity of GM schools in some areas was attributed to the poor financial support offered by local education authorities. GM schools were entitled to apply to central government for capital grants for essential building works.

The additional funding, distinct admissions policies and semi-independent status of grant-maintained schools were controversial and caused friction with LEAs.

At their peak in early 1998, there were 1,196 grant-maintained schools, most of them secondary schools. Within the state sector, they accounted for 3% of primary schools, 19% of secondary schools and 2% of special schools.

== Legacy ==
Grant-maintained status was abolished by the School Standards and Framework Act 1998. GM schools that had previously been voluntary aided, or which had private sponsors, normally returned to voluntary aided status, while others became foundation schools. However schools could choose a different status, and a few became voluntary controlled or community schools. Though funded through local authorities, voluntary aided and foundation schools retain some independence. They own the school buildings and grounds, employ the staff and control their own admissions.

After the abolition of grant-maintained status, the only schools still directly funded by central government were the 15 City Technology Colleges. In 2000 the Labour government introduced a new kind of directly funded school, the City Academy, later renamed Academy. Following the 2010 General Election the Academies Act 2010 was enacted, vastly expanding possibilities for schools to become academies. It was described by journalist Mike Baker as "not an extension of the Labour government's academies, but the recreation of the grant-maintained (GM) schools".

== See also ==
- Education in England
- Education in Wales
