= Sports College (United Kingdom specialist schools programme) =

Specialized secondary schools

Sports Colleges logo used in the UK until 2011

Sports Colleges were introduced in 1997 as part of the Specialist Schools Programme in the United Kingdom. The programme enabled secondary schools to specialise in certain fields, in this case, PE, sports and dance. Schools that successfully applied to the Specialist Schools Trust and became Sports Colleges received extra funding from this joint private sector and government scheme. Sports Colleges act as a local point of reference for other schools and businesses in the area, with an emphasis on promoting sports within the community.

The Specialist Schools Programme ended in 2011 after the change of government. Despite this, schools can still become Sports Colleges through the Dedicated Schools Grant or academisation.
