= Foundation school =

Type of state-funded school in the UK

In England and Wales, a foundation school is a state-funded school in which the governing body has greater freedom in the running of the school than in community schools. Foundation schools were set up under the School Standards and Framework Act 1998 to replace grant-maintained schools, which were funded directly by central government. Grant-maintained schools that had previously been voluntary controlled or county schools (but not voluntary aided) usually became foundation schools.

Foundation schools are a kind of "maintained school", meaning that they are funded by central government via the local education authority, and do not charge fees to students. As with voluntary controlled schools, all capital and running costs are met by the government. As with voluntary aided schools, the governing body employs the staff and has responsibility for admissions to the school, subject to rules imposed by central government. Pupils follow the National Curriculum.

Some foundation schools, also called trust schools, have a foundation or trust that owns the land and buildings. Otherwise the land and buildings are owned by the governing body. The foundation usually appoints about a quarter of the school governors, as in voluntary controlled schools, but in some cases it appoints the majority of governors, as in voluntary aided schools.

Within the maintained sector in England, approximately 2% of primary schools and 15% of secondary schools are foundation schools. Almost all of these are non-faith schools. The proportion is considerably smaller in Wales, where four primary schools and eight secondary schools have foundation status.

== See also ==
- Community school (England and Wales)
- State-funded schools (England)
- Education in England
- Education in Wales
