= Employment and Training Act 1973 =

Act of the Parliament of the United Kingdom

Employment and Training Act 1973 (Note: Section 15(1).)
- Act of Parliament
- Parliament of the United Kingdom
- Long title: An Act to establish public authorities concerned with arrangements for persons to obtain employment and with arrangements for training for employment and to make provision as to the functions of the authorities; to authorise the Secretary of State to provide temporary employment for unemployed persons; to amend the Industrial Training Act 1964 and the law relating to the provision by education authorities of services relating to employment; and for purposes connected with those matters
- Citation: 1973 c. 50
- Introduced by: Maurice Macmillan, Secretary of State for Employment (second reading on 13 March 1973) (Commons)
- Territorial extent: England and Wales; Scotland; Northern Ireland (in part); (Note: Section 15(3).)

Dates
- Royal assent: 25 July 1973
- Commencement: various (Note: Section 15(2).)
Other legislation
Amends	Industrial Training Act 1964
Repeals/revokes	Employment and Training Act 1948
Amended by	House of Commons Disqualification Act 1975; Statute Law (Repeals) Act 1977; Employment Protection (Consolidation) Act 1978; Education (Scotland) Act 1980; Agricultural Training Board Act 1982; Industrial Training Act 1982; Industrial Development Act 1982; Industrial Training Act 1982; Employment Act 1989; Trade Union Reform and Employment Rights Act 1993; Statute Law (Repeals) Act 2004

Status: Amended

Text of statute as originally enacted

Revised text of statute as amended

Text of the Employment and Training Act 1973 as in force today (including any amendments) within the United Kingdom, from legislation.gov.uk.

The Employment and Training Act 1973 (c. 50) is an act of the Parliament of the United Kingdom which makes arrangements for unemployed people to obtain employment by training and other support. It establishes the Manpower Services Commission, the Employment Service Agency and the Training Services Agency.

== Background ==
The purpose of the act was to modernise and reform the labour market and allow individuals to develop and use their capabilities. The legislation established the Manpower Services Commission to operate the employment and training services, this was done through two agencies—the Employment Service Agency, and the Training Services Agency. It makes provision for the education authorities to provide career services. The1973 Act amends the Industrial Training Act 1964 under which the industrial training boards had been established. John Howard Locke, the Deputy-Secretary at the Department of Employment, was largely responsible for drafting the Employment and Training Bill.

== Provisions ==
The long title of the act is: ‘An Act to establish public authorities concerned with arrangements for persons to obtain employment and with arrangements for training for employment and to make provision as to the functions of the authorities; to authorise the Secretary of State to provide temporary employment for unemployed persons; to amend the Industrial Training Act 1964 and the law relating to the provision by education authorities of services relating to employment; and for purposes connected with those matters.’

The act received Royal Assent on 25 July 1973.

The act comprises 15 Sections in five Parts, and four Schedules:

The Manpower Services Commission and the Employment Service and Training Services Agencies

- Section 1. Establishment of the Commission and Agencies
- Section 2. Functions of the Commission and Agencies
- Section 3. Control of the commission by Secretary of State
- Section 4. Obtaining and disclosure of information by the Commission and Agencies etc.

Additional powers of Secretary of State

- Section 5. Additional powers of Secretary of State

Modification of Industrial Training Act 1964 and other enactments

- Section 6. Modification of Act of 1964
- Section 7. Modification and exclusion of other enactments in relation to the Commission and Agencies

Careers services of education authorities

- Section 8. Provision of services by education authorities
- Section 9. Records of vocational advice
- Section 10. Control of education authorities by Secretary of State

Supplemental

- Section 11. Financial provisions
- Section 12. Ancillary and transitional provisions
- Section 13. Interpretation etc.
- Section 14. Minor and consequential amendments of enactments, and repeals
- Section 15. Short title, commencement and extent

Schedules

- Schedule 1. Additional provisions relating to constitution etc. of the Commission and Agencies
- Schedule 2. Modifications of Industrial Training Act 1964
- Schedule 3. Minor and consequential amendments of enactments
- Schedule 4. Repeals

Most of the provisions of the Employment and Training Act 1973 came into force on 1 January 1974.

Secretary of State refers to the Secretary of State for Employment.

== Subsequent amendments ==
The Employment and Training Act 1973 has been amended by later legislation.

- Section 7 was repealed by Employment Protection Act 1975
- Section 1, Section 3 and Schedule 1 were repealed by the Employment Act 1989

New sections were added by subsequent legislation:

- 2A Sex industry (Welfare Reform Act 2012)
- 9A Welsh Ministers (Tertiary Education and Research (Wales) Act 2022)
- 10A Provision of ancillary goods and services (Trade Union Reform and Employment Rights Act 1993)
- 10B Inspection (Learning and Skills Act 2000)

The Manpower Services Commission was renamed the Training Commission in October 1987 and was itself abolished in 1988.

== See also ==
- Industrial Training Act 1964
- Employment Protection Act 1975
- Employment and Training Act 1981
- Employment Act 1989
