= Minister for the Civil Service =

Ministerial position in the Government of the United Kingdom

United Kingdom Minister for the Civil Service
- Royal Arms of His Majesty's Government

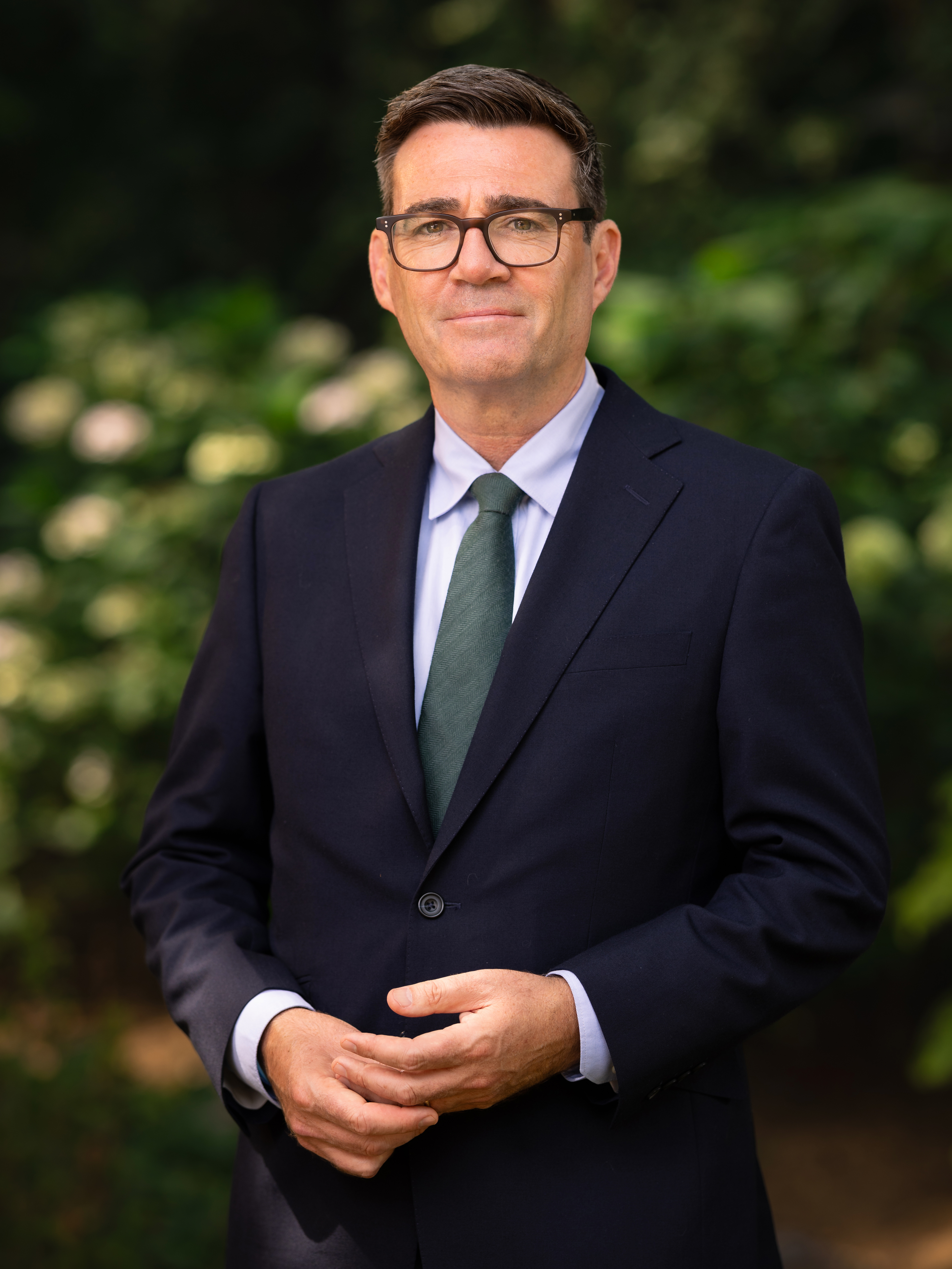
- Incumbent; Andy Burnham since 20 July 2026
- Government of the United Kingdom
- Style: The Right Honourable
- Member of: Cabinet
- Residence: 10 Downing Street
- Seat: Westminster
- Appointer: The King
- Term length: At His Majesty's pleasure
- Inaugural holder: Harold Wilson
- Formation: 1 November 1968; 58 years ago
- Deputy: Louise Haigh; Chancellor of the Duchy of Lancaster Dame Antonia Romeo; Cabinet Secretary and Head of the Civil Service
- Website: Official website

In the Government of the United Kingdom, the minister for the civil service is responsible for regulations regarding His Majesty's Civil Service, the role of which is to assist the governments of the United Kingdom in formulating and implementing policies. The position is invariably held by the prime minister of the United Kingdom.

== The role ==
In recognition of the primary authority of the prime minister over the Civil Service, it is a constitutional convention that the ministry would always be held by the prime minister. The list of ministers for the civil service is therefore identical to the list of prime ministers of the United Kingdom from 1968 onwards.

By the terms of the Civil Service (Management Functions) Act 1992, the minister may delegate his or her power to ministers and others such as the Scottish Government. Prime Minister Gordon Brown appointed Tom Watson to be responsible for digital engagement and Civil Service issues, while other Prime Ministers have given the chancellor of the Duchy of Lancaster and the minister for the Cabinet Office responsibility for the Civil Service.

The Transfer of Functions (Treasury and Minister for the Civil Service) Order 1995, a statutory instrument which transferred functions to the minister responsible for the Civil Service, came into force on 1 April 1995.

The Constitutional Reform and Governance Act 2010 codifies the power of the Minister for the Civil Service to manage the Civil Service, including the power to make appointments, the publication of the Civil Service code of conduct, and the right to be consulted before publication of recruitment principles by the Civil Service Commission. The Act also requires the Minister for the Civil Service to publish a special adviser code of conduct, approve the terms and conditions of appointment of special advisers, and publish an annual report about special advisers serving the UK government.

== Civil Service Department ==
The ministerial office was created for Harold Wilson on 1 November 1968, when responsibilities for the pay and management of the Civil Service were transferred from HM Treasury to a new Civil Service Department.

Margaret Thatcher announced the abolition of the Civil Service Department to the House of Commons on 12 November 1981.

=== Junior ministers in the Civil Service Department ===
Portrait	Name (birth–death)	Term of office		Concurrent ministerial portfolios	Party	Ministry
	Edward Shackleton; Baron Shackleton (1911–1994)	1 December 1968	19 June 1970	Lord Privy Seal	Labour	Wilson
	Parliamentary Secretary; David Howell; MP for Guildford (b. 1936)	20 June 1970	26 March 1972	Lord Commissioner of the Treasury (until 5 January 1971); Parliamentary Under-Secretary of the Department of Employment (from 5 January 1971)	Conservative	Heath
	Parliamentary Secretary; Kenneth Baker; MP for St Marylebone (b. 1934)	20 June 1972	4 March 1974		Conservative	Heath
	Parliamentary Secretary; Geoffrey Johnson-Smith; MP for East Grinstead (1924–2010)	20 June 1972	4 March 1974		Conservative	Heath
	Minister of State; Robert Sheldon; MP for Ashton-under-Lyne (1923–2020)	7 April 1974	18 October 1974		Labour	Wilson
	Parliamentary Secretary; John Grant; MP for Islington Central (1932–2000)	7 April 1974	18 October 1974		Labour	Wilson
	Minister of State; Charles Morris; MP for Manchester Openshaw (1926–2012)	18 October 1974	4 May 1979		Labour	Wilson & Callaghan

== Sources ==
- Daintith, Terence; Page, Alan C. (26 August 1999). "Introduction" (PDF). The Executive in the Constitution: Structure, Autonomy, and Internal Control. Oxford University Press. ISBN 978-0-19-826870-3.
- Pilkington, Colin (1999). The Civil Service in Britain Today. Manchester University Press. ISBN 978-0-7190-5224-8.
