= Judith Lowe =

British civil engineer

Judith Lowe OBE
- Born: Judith Ann Lowe
- Known for: Former deputy chair of the Construction Industry Training Board

Judith Ann Lowe OBE is the former deputy chair of the Construction Industry Training Board.

== Honours ==
She was appointed Officer of the Most Excellent Order of the British Empire (OBE) in the 2015 Birthday Honours for services to the construction industry, particularly women in construction.
