= Industrial Training Act 1982 =

Act of the Parliament of the United Kingdom

Industrial Training Act 1982 (Note: Section 21(1).)
- Act of Parliament
- Parliament of the United Kingdom
- Long title: An Act to consolidate the law relating to industrial training boards.
- Citation: 1982 c. 10
- Territorial extent: England and Wales; Scotland; (Note: Section 21(2).)

Dates
- Royal assent: 29 March 1982
- Commencement: 29 June 1982 (Note: Section 21(3).)

Other legislation
- Amends: See § Repealed enactments
- Repeals/revokes: See § Repealed enactments
- Amended by: Social Security and Housing Benefits Act 1982; Industrial Training Act 1986; Employment Act 1988; Education Reform Act 1988; Dock Work Act 1989; Employment Act 1989; Enterprise and New Towns (Scotland) Act 1990; Companies Act 1989 (Eligibility for Appointment as Company Auditor) (Consequential Amendments) Regulations 1991; Trade Union and Labour Relations (Consolidation) Act 1992; Tribunals and Inquiries Act 1992; Trade Union Reform and Employment Rights Act 1993; Education Act 1996; Employment Rights (Dispute Resolution) Act 1998; Government Resources and Accounts Act 2000 (Audit of Public Bodies) Order 2003; Statute Law (Repeals) Act 2004; Transfer of Undertakings (Protection of Employment) Regulations 2006; Further Education and Training Act 2007; Companies Act 2006 (Consequential Amendments etc) Order 2008
- Relates to: Agricultural Training Board Act 1982

Status: Amended

Text of statute as originally enacted

Revised text of statute as amended

Text of the Industrial Training Act 1982 as in force today (including any amendments) within the United Kingdom, from legislation.gov.uk.

The Industrial Training Act 1982 (c. 10) is an act of the Parliament of the United Kingdom that consolidated enactments relating to industrial training boards in Great Britain.

== Provisions ==
=== Repealed enactments ===
Section 20(3) of the act repealed 7 enactments, listed in schedule 4 to the act.

Enactments repealed by section 20(3)
Citation	Short title	Extent of repeal
1964 c. 16	Industrial Training Act 1964	The whole act except section 16 (save as that act applies to the Agricultural Training Board).
1973 c. 50	Employment and Training Act 1973	Section 6(1), (2) and (5).
1973 c. 50	Employment and Training Act 1973	In Schedule 2, Parts I and II.
1975 c. 18	Social Security (Consequential Provisions) Act 1975	In Schedule 2, paragraph 11, save as it applies to the Agricultural Training Board.
1975 c. 65	Sex Discrimination Act 1975	In section 82(1) the definition of "industrial tribunal".
1976 c. 74	Race Relations Act 1976	In section 78(1) the definition of "industrial tribunal".
1978 c. 44	Employment Protection (Consolidation) Act 1978	In Schedule 16, paragraph 4.
1981 c. 57	Employment and Training Act 1981	Sections 1 to 8 and 11(3).
1981 c. 57	Employment and Training Act 1981	Schedule 1.
1981 c. 57	Employment and Training Act 1981	In Schedule 2, paragraph 4.
