= List of acts of the Parliament of the United Kingdom from 1992 =

This is a list of acts of the Parliament of the United Kingdom passed in 1992.

Acts passed since 1963 are cited by calendar year, as opposed to the convention used for earlier acts of citing the regnal year(s) in which the relevant parliamentary session was held. Each act passed in a respective year is given a chapter number (abbreviated "c."), denoted by Arabic numerals in the case of public general acts, lowercase Roman numerals in the case of local acts, or italicised Arabic numerals in the case of personal acts. These run as separate series.

82 acts of Parliament were passed in 1992: 61 public general acts and 21 local acts.

indicates that an act has been transcribed on Wikisource, indicates that an act is available to view at legislation.gov.uk, and indicates the location of the original act in the Parliamentary Archives.

== Public general acts ==
Short title	Citation	Royal assent
Long title
Consolidated Fund Act 1992 (repealed)	1992 c. 1	13 February 1992
An Act to apply certain sums out of the Consolidated Fund to the service of the years ending on 31st March 1992 and 1993. (Repealed by Appropriation Act 1994 (c. 24))
Stamp Duty (Temporary Provisions) Act 1992 (repealed)	1992 c. 2	13 February 1992
An Act to make provision conferring temporary relief from stamp duty and provision for payments by the Commissioners of Inland Revenue in respect of instruments already stamped. (Repealed by Finance Act 1999 (c. 16))
Severn Bridges Act 1992	1992 c. 3	13 February 1992
An Act to provide for the construction of a new bridge over the Severn Estuary between England and Wales and roads leading to the new bridge and associated works; to make provision for the levying of tolls in respect of use of the existing Severn bridge and the new bridge; to make other provision for and in connection with the operation of the bridges; and for connected purposes.
Social Security Contributions and Benefits Act 1992	1992 c. 4	13 February 1992
An Act to consolidate certain enactments relating to social security contributions and benefits with amendments to give effect to recommendations of the Law Commission and the Scottish Law Commission.
Social Security Administration Act 1992	1992 c. 5	13 February 1992
An Act to consolidate certain enactments relating to the administration of social security and related matters with amendments to give effect to recommendations of the Law Commission and the Scottish Law Commission.
Social Security (Consequential Provisions) Act 1992	1992 c. 6	13 February 1992
An Act to make provision for repeals, consequential amendments, transitional and transitory matters and savings in connection with the consolidation of enactments in the Social Security Contributions and Benefits Act 1992 (Note: Social Security Contributions and Benefits Act 1992 (c. 4)) and the Social Security Administration Act 1992 (Note: Social Security Administration Act 1992 (c. 5)) (including provisions to give effect to recommendations of the Law Commission and the Scottish Law Commission).
Social Security Contributions and Benefits (Northern Ireland) Act 1992	1992 c. 7	13 February 1992
An Act to consolidate for Northern Ireland certain enactments relating to social security contributions and benefits, with corrections and minor improvements under the Consolidation of Enactments (Procedure) Act 1949. (Note: Consolidation of Enactments (Procedure) Act 1949 (12, 13 & 14 Geo. 6. c. 33))
Social Security Administration (Northern Ireland) Act 1992	1992 c. 8	13 February 1992
An Act to consolidate for Northern Ireland certain enactments relating to the administration of social security and related matters, with corrections and minor improvements under the Consolidation of Enactments (Procedure) Act 1949.
Social Security (Consequential Provisions) (Northern Ireland) Act 1992	1992 c. 9	13 February 1992
An Act to make provision for repeals, consequential amendments, transitional and transitory matters and savings in connection with the consolidation of enactments in the Social Security Contributions and Benefits (Northern Ireland) Act 1992 (Note: Social Security Contributions and Benefits (Northern Ireland) Act 1992 (c. 7)) and the Social Security Administration (Northern Ireland) Act 1992 (Note: Social Security Administration (Northern Ireland) Act 1992 (c. 8)) with corrections and minor improvements under the Consolidation of Enactments (Procedure) Act 1949.
Bingo Act 1992 (repealed)	1992 c. 10	6 March 1992
An Act to amend the Gaming Act 1968 (Note: Gaming Act 1968 (c. 65)) with respect to bingo; and for connected purposes. (Repealed by Gambling Act 2005 (c. 19))
Aggravated Vehicle-Taking Act 1992	1992 c. 11	6 March 1992
An Act to make provision with respect to persons who commit offences under section 12(1) of the Theft Act 1968 (Note: Theft Act 1968 (c. 60)) in relation to a mechanically propelled vehicle where additional circumstances are present relating to the driving of or damage to the vehicle.
Taxation of Chargeable Gains Act 1992	1992 c. 12	6 March 1992
An Act to consolidate certain enactments relating to the taxation of chargeable gains.
Further and Higher Education Act 1992	1992 c. 13	6 March 1992
An Act to make new provision about further and higher education.
Local Government Finance Act 1992	1992 c. 14	6 March 1992
An Act to provide for certain local authorities to levy and collect a new tax, to be called council tax; to abolish community charges; to make further provision with respect to local government finance (including provision with respect to certain grants by local authorities); and for connected purposes.
Offshore Safety Act 1992	1992 c. 15	6 March 1992
An Act to extend the application of Part I of the Health and Safety at Work etc. Act 1974; (Note: Health and Safety at Work etc. Act 1974 (c. 37)) to increase the penalties for certain offences under that Part; to confer powers for preserving the security of supplies of petroleum and petroleum products; and for connected purposes.
Nurses, Midwives and Health Visitors Act 1992 (repealed)	1992 c. 16	6 March 1992
An Act to amend the Nurses, Midwives and Health Visitors Act 1979; (Note: Nurses, Midwives and Health Visitors Act 1979 (c. 36)) and for connected purposes. (Repealed by Nurses, Midwives and Health Visitors Act 1997 (c. 24))
Coal Industry Act 1992 (repealed)	1992 c. 17	6 March 1992
An Act to make provision for extending the duration of, and increasing the limit on, grants under section 3 of the Coal Industry Act 1987 (Note: Coal Industry Act 1987 (c. 3)) and to repeal the Coal Mines Regulation Act 1908. (Note: Coal Mines Regulation Act 1908 (8 Edw. 7. c. 57)) (Repealed by Coal Industry Act 1994 (c. 21))
Licensing (Amendment) (Scotland) Act 1992 (repealed)	1992 c. 18	6 March 1992
An Act to amend the provisions of the Licensing (Scotland) Act 1976 (Note: Licensing (Scotland) Act 1976 (c. 66)) relating to the transfer of licences; and for connected purposes. (Repealed by Licensing (Scotland) Act 2005 (Consequential Provisions) Order 2009 (SSI 2009/248))
Local Government Act 1992	1992 c. 19	6 March 1992
An Act to make new provision, by giving effect to proposals in Cm. 1599 (The Citizen's Charter) relating to publicity and competition, for securing economy, efficiency and effectiveness in the manner in which local authorities carry on certain activities; and to make new provision in relation to local government in England for effecting structural, boundary and electoral changes.
Finance Act 1992	1992 c. 20	16 March 1992
An Act to grant certain duties, to alter other duties, and to amend the law relating to the National Debt and the Public Revenue, and to make further provision in connection with Finance.
Consolidated Fund (No. 2) Act 1992 (repealed)	1992 c. 21	16 March 1992
An Act to apply certain sums out of the Consolidated Fund to the service of the years ending on 31st March 1991 and 1992. (Repealed by Appropriation Act 1994 (c. 24))
Appropriation Act 1992 (repealed)	1992 c. 22	16 March 1992
An Act to apply certain sums out of the Consolidated Fund to the service of the years ending on 31st March 1992 and 31st March 1993, to appropriate the supplies granted in this Session of Parliament, and to repeal certain Consolidated Fund and Appropriation Acts. (Repealed by Appropriation Act 1994 (c. 24))
Access to Neighbouring Land Act 1992	1992 c. 23	16 March 1992
An Act to enable persons who desire to carry out works to any land which are reasonably necessary for the preservation of that land to obtain access to neighbouring land in order to do so; and for purposes connected therewith.
Offshore Safety (Protection Against Victimisation) Act 1992 (repealed)	1992 c. 24	16 March 1992
An Act to protect employees working on offshore installations against victimisation when acting as safety representatives or members of safety committees. (Repealed by Trade Union Reform and Employment Rights Act 1993 (c. 19))
Prison Security Act 1992	1992 c. 25	16 March 1992
An Act to make provision for an offence of prison mutiny and for a new offence and new penalties in connection with escapes from prison.
Tourism (Overseas Promotion) (Wales) Act 1992	1992 c. 26	16 March 1992
An Act to enable the Wales Tourist Board to carry on abroad activities to promote tourism to and within Wales.
Parliamentary Corporate Bodies Act 1992	1992 c. 27	16 March 1992
An Act to establish corporate bodies to hold land and perform other functions for the benefit of the Houses of Parliament; to make provision for and in connection with the transfer of certain property, rights and liabilities to those corporate bodies; and for purposes connected therewith.
Medicinal Products: Prescription by Nurses etc. Act 1992	1992 c. 28	16 March 1992
An Act to make provision with respect to medicinal products prescribed or otherwise ordered by registered nurses, midwives and health visitors.
Still-Birth (Definition) Act 1992	1992 c. 29	16 March 1992
An Act to amend the law in respect of the definition of still-birth; to make certain consequential amendments of the law; and for connected purposes.
Traffic Calming Act 1992	1992 c. 30	16 March 1992
An Act to make provision about the carrying out on highways of works affecting the movement of vehicular and other traffic for the purposes of promoting safety and of preserving or improving the environment; and for connected purposes.
Firearms (Amendment) Act 1992	1992 c. 31	16 March 1992
An Act to empower the Secretary of State to extend the period for which firearm and shot gun certificates are granted or renewed.
Cheques Act 1992	1992 c. 32	16 March 1992
An Act to amend the law relating to cheques.
Social Security (Mortgage Interest Payments) Act 1992	1992 c. 33	16 March 1992
An Act to make provision for requiring, in certain cases where interest on a loan secured on land is payable by a person who is entitled, or whose partner, former partner or qualifying associate is entitled, to income support, the applicable amount in respect of which includes a sum in respect of that interest, that a part of the benefits to which any of those persons is entitled under the enactments relating to social security shall be paid directly to the lender and applied towards the discharge of the liability in respect of the interest; and for purposes connected therewith.
Sexual Offences (Amendment) Act 1992	1992 c. 34	16 March 1992
An Act to make provision with respect to anonymity in connection with allegations of, and criminal proceedings relating to, certain sexual offences.
Timeshare Act 1992 (repealed)	1992 c. 35	16 March 1992
An Act to provide for rights to cancel certain agreements about timeshare accommodation. (Repealed by Timeshare, Holiday Products, Resale and Exchange Contracts Regulations 2010 (SI 2010/2960))
Sea Fisheries (Wildlife Conservation) Act 1992	1992 c. 36	16 March 1992
An Act to require appropriate Ministers and relevant bodies to have regard to the conservation of flora and fauna in the discharge of their functions under the Sea Fisheries Acts.
Further and Higher Education (Scotland) Act 1992	1992 c. 37	16 March 1992
An Act to make new provision about further and higher education in Scotland; and for connected purposes.
Education (Schools) Act 1992	1992 c. 38	16 March 1992
An Act to make provision with respect to the inspection of schools and with respect to information about schools and their pupils.
Army Act 1992 (repealed)	1992 c. 39	16 March 1992
An Act to provide for members of the Ulster Defence Regiment to cease to be members of that Regiment at the end of June 1992; to provide for the amendment of section 2 of the Armed Forces Act 1966 (Note: Armed Forces Act 1966 (c. 45)) in relation to service in Northern Ireland; and for connected purposes. (Repealed by Armed Forces Act 2006 (c. 52))
Friendly Societies Act 1992	1992 c. 40	16 March 1992
An Act to make further provision for friendly societies; to provide for the cessation of registration under the Friendly Societies Act 1974; (Note: Friendly Societies Act 1974 (c. 46)) to make provision about disputes involving friendly societies or other bodies registered under the Friendly Societies Act 1974 and about the functions of the Chief Registrar of friendly societies; and for connected purposes.
Charities Act 1992	1992 c. 41	16 March 1992
An Act to amend the Charities Act 1960 (Note: Charities Act 1960 (8 & 9 Eliz. 2. c. 58)) and make other provision with respect to charities; to regulate fund-raising activities carried on in connection with charities and other institutions; to make fresh provision with respect to public charitable collections; and for connected purposes.
Transport and Works Act 1992	1992 c. 42	16 March 1992
An Act to provide for the making of orders relating to, or to matters ancillary to, the construction or operation of railways, tramways, trolley vehicle systems, other guided transport systems and inland waterways, and orders relating to, or to matters ancillary to, works interfering with rights of navigation; to make further provision in relation to railways, tramways, trolley vehicle systems and other guided transport systems; to amend certain enactments relating to harbours; and for connected purposes.
Competition and Service (Utilities) Act 1992	1992 c. 43	16 March 1992
An Act to make provision with respect to standards of performance and service to customers in relation to the telecommunications, gas supply, electricity supply, water supply and sewerage service industries; to make provision with respect to complaints by, and disputes with, customers in those industries; to make provision with respect to the powers of the regulators of those industries and with respect to related matters; to make provision with respect to the payment of deposits by customers of certain telecommunications operators; to make further provision for facilitating effective competition in certain of those industries; to make provision with respect to mergers of water or sewerage undertakers; to make provision with respect to compliance orders against public gas suppliers; to make a minor correction in section 98 of the Water Industry Act 1991; (Note: Water Industry Act 1991 (c. 56)) and for connected purposes.
Museums and Galleries Act 1992	1992 c. 44	16 March 1992
An Act to establish Boards of Trustees of the National Gallery, the Tate Gallery, the National Portrait Gallery and the Wallace Collection; to transfer property to them and confer functions on them; to make new provision as to transfers to and between the collections of certain museums, galleries and libraries; to make provision for and in connection with the vesting of land in the governing bodies of such institutions; to make provision for the financing of such institutions and of the Museums and Galleries Commission; to make further provision with respect to the giving of indemnities against the loss of, or damage to, objects on loan to certain institutions; to change the name of, and to make further provision with respect to, the British Museum (Natural History); and to amend certain enactments relating to museums, galleries and libraries; and for purposes connected therewith.
Mauritius Republic Act 1992	1992 c. 45	18 June 1992
An Act to make provision in connection with Mauritius becoming a republic within the Commonwealth.
Non-Domestic Rating Act 1992	1992 c. 46	18 June 1992
An Act to make further provision with respect to non-domestic rating for the period beginning with 11th March 1992 and ending with 31st March 1995; and for connected purposes.
Appropriation (No. 2) Act 1992 (repealed)	1992 c. 47	16 July 1992
An Act to apply certain sums out of the Consolidated Fund to the service of the year ending on 31st March 1993 and to appropriate the supplies granted in this Session of Parliament. (Repealed by Appropriation Act 1994 (c. 24))
Finance (No. 2) Act 1992	1992 c. 48	16 July 1992
An Act to grant certain duties, to alter other duties, and to amend the law relating to the National Debt and the Public Revenue, and to make further provision in connection with Finance.
Community Care (Residential Accommodation) Act 1992	1992 c. 49	16 July 1992
An Act to make further provision with respect to the making of arrangements under section 21 of the National Assistance Act 1948 (Note: National Assistance Act 1948 (11 & 12 Geo. 6. c. 29)) for the provision of residential accommodation in premises managed by persons other than local authorities.
Carriage of Goods by Sea Act 1992	1992 c. 50	16 July 1992
An Act to replace the Bills of Lading Act 1855 (Note: Bills of Lading Act 1855 (18 & 19 Vict. c. 111)) with new provision with respect to bills of lading and certain other shipping documents.
Protection of Badgers Act 1992	1992 c. 51	16 July 1992
An Act to consolidate the Badgers Act 1973, (Note: Badgers Act 1973 (c. 57)) the Badgers Act 1991 (Note: Badgers Act 1991 (c. 36)) and the Badgers (Further Protection) Act 1991. (Note: Badgers (Further Protection) Act 1991 (c. 35))
Trade Union and Labour Relations (Consolidation) Act 1992	1992 c. 52	16 July 1992
An Act to consolidate the enactments relating to collective labour relations, that is to say, to trade unions, employers' associations, industrial relations and industrial action.
Tribunals and Inquiries Act 1992	1992 c. 53	16 July 1992
An Act to consolidate the Tribunals and Inquiries Act 1971 (Note: Tribunals and Inquiries Act 1971 (c. 62)) and certain other enactments relating to tribunals and inquiries.
Human Fertilisation and Embryology (Disclosure of Information) Act 1992 (repealed)	1992 c. 54	16 July 1992
An Act to relax the restrictions on the disclosure of information imposed by section 33(5) of the Human Fertilisation and Embryology Act 1990. (Note: Human Fertilisation and Embryology Act 1990 (c. 37)) (Repealed by Human Fertilisation and Embryology Act 2008 (c. 22))
Boundary Commissions Act 1992	1992 c. 55	12 November 1992
An Act to make further provision with respect to the membership of the Boundary Commissions, the timing of their reports and the local government boundaries of which account is to be taken in their reports.
Maintenance Orders (Reciprocal Enforcement) Act 1992	1992 c. 56	12 November 1992
An Act to amend the Maintenance Orders (Facilities for Enforcement) Act 1920 (Note: Maintenance Orders (Facilities for Enforcement) Act 1920 (10 & 11 Geo. 5. c. 33)) and the Maintenance Orders (Reciprocal Enforcement) Act 1972; (Note: Maintenance Orders (Reciprocal Enforcement) Act 1972 (c. 18)) and for connected purposes.
Sporting Events (Control of Alcohol etc.) (Amendment) Act 1992 (repealed)	1992 c. 57	3 December 1992
An Act to extend the maximum period for which an order under section 3 of the Sporting Events (Control of Alcohol etc.) Act 1985 (Note: Sporting Events (Control of Alcohol etc.) Act 1985 (c. 57)) may remain in force. (Repealed by Licensing Act 2003 (c. 17))
Car Tax (Abolition) Act 1992 (repealed)	1992 c. 58	3 December 1992
An Act to abolish car tax. (Repealed by Statute Law (Repeals) Act 2004 (c. 14))
Consolidated Fund (No. 3) Act 1992 (repealed)	1992 c. 59	17 December 1992
An Act to apply certain sums out of the Consolidated Fund to the service of the years ending on 31st March 1993 and 1994. (Repealed by Appropriation Act 1995 (c. 19))
Sea Fish (Conservation) Act 1992	1992 c. 60	17 December 1992
An Act to amend the law relating to licences under sections 4 and 4A of the Sea Fish (Conservation) Act 1967. (Note: Sea Fish (Conservation) Act 1967 (c. 84))
Civil Service (Management Functions) Act 1992	1992 c. 61	17 December 1992
An Act to make provision with respect to functions relating to the management of Her Majesty's Home Civil Service; and to make provision about parliamentary procedure in relation to legislation for Northern Ireland making corresponding provision with respect to the Northern Ireland Civil Service.

== Local acts ==
Short title	Citation	Royal assent
Long title
British Railways Act 1992	1992 c. i	13 February 1992
An Act to empower the British Railways Board to construct works and to acquire land; to confer further powers on the Board; and for other purposes.
Aberdeen Harbour Order Confirmation Act 1992	1992 c. ii	6 March 1992
An Act to confirm a Provisional Order under the Private Legislation Procedure (Scotland) Act 1936, (Note: Private Legislation Procedure (Scotland) Act 1936 (26 Geo. 5 & 1 Edw. 8. c. 52)) relating to Aberdeen Harbour.
	Aberdeen Harbour Order 1992 Provisional Order relating to road traffic offences on harbour roads and the application to those roads of certain provisions of the Traffic Acts.	
London Underground Act 1992	1992 c. iii	16 March 1992
An Act to empower London Regional Transport and London Underground Limited to construct works and to acquire lands; to confer further powers on London Regional Transport and London Underground Limited; and for other purposes.
Aire and Calder Navigation Act 1992	1992 c. iv	16 March 1992
An Act to provide for restoration and diversion of a section of the river Aire and of the Aire and Calder Navigation within the St. Aidan's Remainder Opencast Site of the British Coal Corporation; to authorise the Corporation to construct works and to acquire lands; to confer further powers on the Corporation; and for other purposes.
Avon Weir Act 1992	1992 c. v	16 March 1992
An Act to authorise the Bristol Development Corporation to construct a weir in and across the river Avon (Bristol) and to execute other works; to authorise the Corporation to acquire lands; to provide for the regulation, control and development of part of the river Avon and adjacent land and waterways for purposes including amenity and recreation; to confer further powers on the Corporation; and for other purposes.
Folkestone Harbour Act 1992	1992 c. vi	16 March 1992
An Act to empower Folkestone Properties Limited to reclaim land and construct works at Folkestone Harbour; to make provision with respect to dredging and moorings; and for connected or other purposes.
Midland Metro Act 1992	1992 c. vii	16 March 1992
An Act to empower the West Midlands Passenger Transport Executive to construct additional works for extension of their light rail rapid passenger transport system; to authorise the acquisition of lands for that purpose; to confer further powers upon the Executive; and for other purposes.
Midland Metro (No. 2) Act 1992	1992 c. viii	16 March 1992
An Act to empower the West Midlands Passenger Transport Executive to construct additional works for extension of their light rail rapid passenger transport system and substituted works for parts of that system; to authorise the acquisition of lands for that purpose; to confer further powers upon the Executive; and for other purposes.
Pittenweem Harbour Order Confirmation Act 1992	1992 c. ix	18 June 1992
An Act to confirm a Provisional Order under the Private Legislation Procedure (Scotland) Act 1936, relating to Pittenweem Harbour.
	Pittenweem Harbour Order 1992 Provisional Order to make provision for the improvement of Pittenweem Harbour by the Fife Regional Council; and for connected purposes.	
Mersey Docks and Harbour Act 1992	1992 c. x	18 June 1992
An Act to confer additional powers upon The Mersey Docks and Harbour Company; to amend the Mersey Docks and Harbour Act 1971 (Note: Mersey Docks and Harbour Act 1971 (c. lvii)) and the Mersey Docks and Harbour Act 1986; (Note: Mersey Docks and Harbour Act 1986 (c. xxv)) and for connected or other purposes.
British Railways (No. 2) Act 1992	1992 c. xi	18 June 1992
An Act to empower the British Railways Board to construct works and to acquire land; to confer further powers on the Board; and for other purposes.
Peterhead Harbours Order Confirmation Act 1992	1992 c. xii	16 July 1992
An Act to confirm a Provisional Order under the Private Legislation Procedure (Scotland) Act 1936, relating to Peterhead Harbours.
	Peterhead Harbours Order 1992 Provisional Order to consolidate with additions and amendments the Acts and Orders relating to the harbours of Peterhead; to make new provision with respect to the constitution, qualification, election and appointment of the trustees of the said harbours; to redefine the limits of the harbours; to make further and better provision for the maintenance and administration of the harbours; and for connected purposes.	
Ulster Bank Act 1992	1992 c. xiii	16 July 1992
An Act to provide for the transfer to and vesting in Ulster Bank Limited of the undertaking of Ulster Bank Executor and Trustee Services Company; and for other purposes.
Cattewater Reclamation Act 1992	1992 c. xiv	16 July 1992
An Act to empower New Cattedown Limited to construct works in the Cattewater in the city of Plymouth; to authorise the Company to acquire lands; and for other purposes.
River Humber (Upper Pyewipe Outfall) Act 1992	1992 c. xv	16 July 1992
An Act to authorise CIBA-GEIGY Chemicals Limited to construct works and to purchase or use land at Pyewipe, Grimsby, in the county of Humberside; to confer further powers on the Company; and for connected purposes.
London Regional Transport (Penalty Fares) Act 1992	1992 c. xvi	12 November 1992
An Act to empower the charging of a penalty fare in substitution for the proper fare for persons using transport services under the control of London Regional Transport without a valid ticket for such use; and for related purposes.
Price's Patent Candle Company Limited Act 1992	1992 c. xvii	12 November 1992
An Act to confer further powers on Price's Patent Candle Company Limited; and for other purposes.
Greater Manchester (Light Rapid Transit System) Act 1992	1992 c. xviii	12 November 1992
An Act to empower the Greater Manchester Passenger Transport Executive to construct further works and to acquire additional lands; to confer further powers on the Executive; and for other purposes.
Llanelli Borough Council (River Lliedi) Act 1992	1992 c. xix	3 December 1992
An Act to extinguish all rights of navigation over part of the river Lliedi in Llanelli; and for connected or other purposes.
Durham Markets Company Act 1992	1992 c. xx	3 December 1992
An Act to confer further powers on the Durham Markets Company Limited; and for other purposes.
City of Bristol (Portishead Docks) Act 1992	1992 c. xxi	3 December 1992
An Act to empower the City Council of Bristol to close the Portishead Docks and to dispose of the Portishead Docks undertaking; to provide for the repeal of certain enactments relating to the Portishead Docks; and for connected or other purposes.

== See also ==
- List of acts of the Parliament of the United Kingdom
