= Agricultural Training Board Act 1982 =

Act of the Parliament of the United Kingdom

Agricultural Training Board Act 1982 (Note: Section 12(1).)
- Act of Parliament
- Parliament of the United Kingdom
- Long title: An Act to consolidate the law relating to the Agricultural Training Board.
- Citation: 1982 c. 9
- Territorial extent: England and Wales; Scotland; (Note: Section 12(2).)

Dates
- Royal assent: 29 March 1982
- Commencement: 29 June 1982 (Note: Section 12(3).)
- Repealed: 22 July 2004

Other legislation
- Amends: See § Repealed enactments
- Repeals/revokes: See § Repealed enactments
- Amended by: Trade Union Reform and Employment Rights Act 1993
- Repealed by: Statute Law (Repeals) Act 2004
- Relates to: Industrial Training Act 1982

Status: Repealed

Text of statute as originally enacted

Revised text of statute as amended

The Agricultural Training Board Act 1982 (c. 9) was an act of the Parliament of the United Kingdom that consolidated enactments related to the Agricultural Training Board in Great Britain.

== Provisions ==
=== Repealed enactments ===
Section 11(1) of the act repealed 4 enactments, listed in schedule 2 to the act.

Enactments repealed by section 11(1)
Citation	Short title	Extent of repeal
1964 c. 16	Industrial Training Act 1964	The whole act except section 16.
1973 c. 50	Employment and Training Act 1973	Section 6(3), (4).
1973 c. 50	Employment and Training Act 1973	In section 14(2), the words from "but" onwards.
1973 c. 50	Employment and Training Act 1973	In Schedule 2, Parts III and IV.
1975 c. 18	Social Security (Consequential Provisions) Act 1975	In Schedule 2, paragraph 11.
1979 c. 13	Agricultural Statistics Act 1979	In Schedule 1, paragraph 3.

== Subsequent developments ==
The whole act was repealed by section 1(1) of, and group 2 of part 2 of schedule 1 to, the Statute Law (Repeals) Act 2004, which came into force on 22 July 2004.
