= Bingo Act 1992 =

Act of the Parliament of the United Kingdom

Bingo Act 1992 (Note: Section 2(1).)
- Act of Parliament
- Parliament of the United Kingdom
- Long title: An Act to amend the Gaming Act 1968 with respect to bingo; and for connected purposes.
- Citation: 1992 c. 10
- Introduced by: Peter Fry (Commons); Baron Harmar-Nicholls (Lords)
- Territorial extent: England and Wales; Scotland; (Note: Section 2(2).)

Dates
- Royal assent: 6 March 1992
- Commencement: 6 May 1992 (Note: Section 2(1).)
- Repealed: 1 September 2007 (Note: The Gambling Act 2005 (Commencement No. 6 and Transitional Provisions) Order 2006 (SI 2006/3272).)
Other legislation
Amends	Gaming Act 1968
Amended by	Deregulation (Betting and Bingo Advertising etc.) Order 1997; Statute Law (Repeals) Act 2004
Repealed by	Gambling Act 2005

Status: Repealed

Text of statute as originally enacted

Revised text of statute as amended

The Bingo Act 1992 (c. 10) was an act of the Parliament of the United Kingdom. The act regulated the types of advertisements that bingo halls were allowed to use, relaxing the law in comparison to the rules on advertising for casinos.

== Provisions ==
The provisions of the act amended section 42 of the Gaming Act 1968 to:

- Ban advertisements aimed at getting people to play bingo or to join a bingo club, or advertising about events at bingo clubs.
- Ban advertisements within 400 metres of bingo clubs with any information that indicated their location or encouraged people to attend or become a member.
- Remove bingo clubs from the previous exemption on advertising that allowed signs on the premises indicating that there was a bingo club there.
- Allow advertisements on the bingo club premises about prizes, so long as that prize had been or could be won by a player on those premises.
- Allow advertisements on the bingo club premises about prizes from multiple bingo, (Note: Multiple bingo is defined by the Gambling (Bingo) Act 1985 as a game of bingo played jointly and at the same time on different bingo club premises where the draw is determined beforehand and the prize is calculated using the stakes at all the premises.) so long as the advertisement cannot be seen from outside the premises and so long as that prize had been or could be won by a player playing that game.
- Allowing advertisements in newspapers circulating in England and Wales or in Scotland about prizes from multiple bingo, so long as that prize had been or could be won by a player playing in that game.
- Allowing advertisements for bingo clubs and their events and encouraging people to attend, so long as the advertisement is displayed at the club's premises and does not mention prizes for signs, or so long as the advertisement is not in a newspaper circulating in England, Wales or Scotland and does not mention prizes or be published with anything else that mentions prizes.
- Include extra definitions needed as a consequence of the other amendments.
- Repeal parts of the Gaming (Bingo) Act 1985 and the Broadcasting Act 1990 which were superseded by the act.

== Passage ==
Baron Harmar-Nicholls, a Conservative peer, was a proponent of relaxing regulations on bingo halls, calling them "social centres" and "very innocent" of the dangers of casino gambling, and first introduced a bill on the matter in early 1991 which was defeated on the grounds that gambling should not be encouraged by the government. In December 1991, Harmar-Nicholls introduced the act in the House of Lords as a private member's bill; it was later introduced into the House of Commons by Peter Fry. It gained royal assent on 6 March 1992, and came into force two months later.

== Legacy ==
Bingo operators felt that the Bingo Act did not go far enough, and that they still faced excessive regulation. Because of the new laws, the National Bingo Game could advertise prize money in the national press, while local clubs were unable to publicise where people could play.

Large parts of the act were repealed by the Deregulation (Betting and Bingo Advertising etc.) Order 1997, made by Timothy Kirkhope (the then-Parliamentary Under-Secretary of State for the Home Department) under powers in the Deregulation and Contracting Out Act 1994.

The Statute Law (Repeals) Act 2004 reversed the repeals the act made.

The rest of the act was repealed by the Gambling Act 2005.

== See also ==
- Private members' bills in the Parliament of the United Kingdom
- List of acts of the Parliament of the United Kingdom from 1992
