= Statute Law (Repeals) Act 2004 =

Act of the Parliament of the United Kingdom

Statute Law (Repeals) Act 2004 (Note: Section 3.)
- Act of Parliament
- Parliament of the United Kingdom
- Long title: An Act to promote the reform of the statute law by the repeal, in accordance with recommendations of the Law Commission and the Scottish Law Commission, of certain enactments which (except in so far as their effect is preserved) are no longer of practical utility, and to make other provision in connection with the repeal of those enactments.
- Citation: 2004 c. 14
- Territorial extent: United Kingdom (Note: Section 2.)

Dates
- Royal assent: 22 July 2004
- Commencement: 22 July 2004 (Note: Section 4(b) of the Interpretation Act 1978.)
Other legislation
Amends	Carriers Act 1830; Judicial Committee Act 1833; Non-Parochial Registers Act 1840; Game Licences Act 1860; Finance Act 1937; Public Records Act 1958; Road Traffic Act 1960; See § Repealed enactments
Repeals/revokes	See § Repealed enactments
Amended by	Constitutional Reform Act 2005; Legislative and Regulatory Reform Act 2006
Relates to	See Statute Law (Repeals) Act

Status: Amended

Text of statute as originally enacted

Revised text of statute as amended

The Statute Law (Repeals) Act 2004 (c. 14) is an act of the Parliament of the United Kingdom.

== Background ==
The act implemented recommendations contained in the seventeenth report on statute law revision, by the Law Commission and the Scottish Law Commission.

== Provisions ==
The act repealed 68 acts completely and parts of 400 others.

The act repealed legislation relating to powers for the Metropolitan Police to license shoeblacks or commissionaires and offences relating to impersonating a shoeblack or a commissionaire.

=== Repealed enactments ===
Section 1(1) of the act repealed 68 enactments in their entirety and parts of over 400 further enactments, and revoked 2 instruments, listed in the seventeen parts of schedule 1 to the act.

==== Part 1 — Administration of Justice ====
Part 1 — Administration of Justice
Citation	Short title	Extent of repeal
Group 1 – Judicial Committee of the Privy Council
3 & 4 Will. 4 c. 41	Judicial Committee Act 1833	Section 14. Section 23. In section 24, the words from "said Courts" to "any other" and from "in India" to "Good Hope".
14 & 15 Vict. c. 83	Court of Chancery Act 1851	The whole act.
58 & 59 Vict. c. 44	Judicial Committee Amendment Act 1895	In the Schedule, the entries for "New South Wales", "Queensland", "South Australia", "Tasmania", "Victoria" and "Western Australia".
8 Edw. 7 c. 51	Appellate Jurisdiction Act 1908	Section 1. Section 3. Schedule.
Group 2 – Central Criminal Court (Prisons) Act 1881
44 & 45 Vict. c. 64	Central Criminal Court (Prisons) Act 1881	The whole act.
1964 c. 42	Administration of Justice Act 1964	In Schedule 3, paragraph 10.
1971 c. 23	Courts Act 1971	In Schedule 8, paragraph 14.
Group 3 – Courts Act 1971
1971 c. 23	Courts Act 1971	Section 20(5) and (6). Section 41. Section 42(1) and (4). Section 43. Section 53. Section 55(4). Section 59(2) to (4). In section 59(5), paragraphs (a) and (e). In section 59(6), paragraph (a) and, in paragraph (e), the words "section 12 of the Indictable Offences Act 1848 and". In Schedule 2, in Part 1, paragraph 1 and, in paragraph 3(2), the words from ", other" to "by virtue of this Act,". In Schedule 2, in Part 2, paragraph 8. Schedule 5. In Schedule 7, paragraphs 4 and 5. In Schedule 8, in Part 2, paragraphs 55, 59, 60(1) and 60(2). In Schedule 9, in Part 1, the entries relating to the Inclosure Act 1845, the Trade Union Act 1871, the Brine Pumping (Compensation for Subsidence) Act 1891, the Dogs Amendment Act 1938, the Water Act 1945, the Shops Act 1950, the Agriculture (Safety, Health and Welfare Provisions) Act 1956, the Affiliation Proceedings Act 1957, the Trading Representations (Disabled Persons) Act 1958, the Adoption Act 1958 and the Factories Act 1961. In Schedule 10, paragraphs 1(3), 2 to 8, 10 and 17.
Group 4 – General Repeals
5 & 6 Vict. c. 97	Limitation of Actions and Costs Act 1842	Section 2.
24 & 25 Geo. 5 c. 41	Law Reform (Miscellaneous Provisions) Act 1934	Section 3(1C). In section 3(1D), the words from "and any reference" to the end.
1964 c. iv	City of London (Courts) Act 1964	In section 7, the words "the remuneration of, and".
1965 c. 2	Administration of Justice Act 1965	In Schedule 1, the entries relating to the Clergy Residence Act 1826, the Inclosure Act 1845, the Tithe Act 1846 and the Tithe Act 1860.
1969 c. 58	Administration of Justice Act 1969	Section 36(5) and (6). In Schedule 1, the entries relating to the Settled Land Act 1925 and the County Courts Act 1959.
1970 c. 31	Administration of Justice Act 1970	Section 41(5). Section 54(4). In section 54(6), the words ", and section 2(5)" and ", 43(6)". In Schedule 2, paragraphs 26 and 28.
1973 c. 15	Administration of Justice Act 1973	Section 6. Schedule 2.
1975 c. 47	Litigants in Person (Costs and Expenses) Act 1975	Section 2(2) and (3).
1977 c. 38	Administration of Justice Act 1977	Section 1. Section 2(3). Section 5(3). Sections 11 and 12. Section 19(2). Section 32(5) to (7). In Schedule 2, in Part 1, paragraphs 3, 4 and 6.
1981 c. 49	Contempt of Court Act 1981	Section 3(4). Section 4(4). In Schedule 2, in Part 3, paragraph 1.
1981 c. 54	Supreme Court Act 1981	Section 141. Section 152(2) and (5). In Schedule 5, the entries relating to the Nurses (Amendment) Act 1961, the Rivers (Prevention of Pollution) Act 1961, the Administration of Justice Act 1964, the Administration of Justice Act 1965, the Matrimonial Causes Act 1967, the Health and Safety at Work etc. Act 1974 and the Arbitration Act 1979.
1982 c. 53	Administration of Justice Act 1982	Section 3(2). Section 6(3). Section 34(1) and (2). Section 35. In section 46(2), paragraphs (a)(iv), (c) and (g). Sections 49 and 50. Section 59(3). Section 73(8). Section 77(5). In Schedule 3, paragraphs 4(b) and (c) and 7. In Schedule 8, paragraph 3.
1983 c. 45	County Courts (Penalties for Contempt) Act 1983	Section 2(2).
1984 c. 28	County Courts Act 1984	In section 24(2)(g), the words "and 25". In Schedule 2, paragraphs 22, 24, 30, 35, 36, 38, 39, 44 to 46, 48, 50, 57, 63, 73, 74, 76 and 77.
1985 c. 61	Administration of Justice Act 1985	Section 51(2).
1986 c. 57	Public Trustee and Administration of Funds Act 1986	Section 4. Section 6(2).
1990 c. 41	Courts and Legal Services Act 1990	Section 2(4). Section 12. Section 14. Section 16. Section 62. Section 78(3) and (4). Section 84. Section 93(4). Section 109(5) and (6). Section 114. In Schedule 17, paragraphs 1, 3, 9 and 18.
1997 c. 69	Supreme Court (Offices) Act 1997	The whole act.
1999 c. 22	Access to Justice Act 1999	Section 35(1). Section 70. Section 79.

==== Part 2 — Agriculture ====
Part 2 — Agriculture
Citation	Short title	Extent of repeal
Group 1 – Agricultural Development, Production and Marketing
6 & 7 Geo. 6 c. 16	Agriculture (Miscellaneous Provisions) Act 1943	In Schedule 3, the entries relating to sections 5, 7, 11, 12, 13, 15 and 16 of the Corn Returns Act 1882.
7 & 8 Geo. 6 c. 28	Agriculture (Miscellaneous Provisions) Act 1944	The whole act.
9 & 10 Geo. 6 c. 73	Hill Farming Act 1946	Section 10. In section 36(2), the words from ", or retained" to "United Kingdom,". In section 37(1), paragraph (b).
10 & 11 Geo. 6 c. 48	Agriculture Act 1947	Sections 83 and 84. Section 86. Sections 88 and 89. Sections 92 to 95. Schedule 2. Schedule 11.
2 & 3 Eliz. 2 c. 23	Hill Farming Act 1954	The whole act.
2 & 3 Eliz. 2 c. 39	Agriculture (Miscellaneous Provisions) Act 1954	Section 6(7).
5 & 6 Eliz. 2 c. 5	Agriculture (Silo Subsidies) Act 1956	The whole act.
5 & 6 Eliz. 2 c. 57	Agriculture Act 1957	Section 32. Section 37(2). In section 37(3), the words ", except Part III,".
6 & 7 Eliz. 2 c. 47	Agricultural Marketing Act 1958	In section 3(2), the words from the beginning to "this section,". Section 3(4) to (6). Parts 2 and 3. In section 47(2), the words ", or Part III thereof,". Section 52(4). Section 54(3) and (5). Section 55(2).
6 & 7 Eliz. 2 c. 71	Agriculture Act 1958	Section 1. In section 8(1), the words from "and the enactments" to "Scotland)". In section 9(1), the definition of "the appointed day". Section 10(2). In Schedule 1, paragraph 2. In Schedule 4, paragraphs 1, 2, 10, 13 and 14.
7 & 8 Eliz. 2 c. 54	Weeds Act 1959	Section 10(3) to (5).
8 & 9 Eliz. 2 c. 22	Horticulture Act 1960	Part 2. Section 21. Schedule 1.
1963 c. 11	Agriculture (Miscellaneous Provisions) Act 1963	Section 23(3). Section 26. In section 27, paragraph (b). In section 29(2), the words ", except in section 5," and from "and "the Ministers"" to the end. In section 29(3), the reference to sections 16(2) and 19 and the words from "and section 21" to the end.
1964 c. 28	Agriculture and Horticulture Act 1964	Section 21. In section 26(3), the words "(2) and".
1967 c. 22	Agriculture Act 1967	In section 3(3)(a), the words "1 or section". Section 16. Section 22. Sections 33 and 34. In section 58(8), the words from "and if a person ceases" to the end. Section 61. Section 62(2). In section 62(3), the words "except the last foregoing section,". Section 64(3). In section 64(4), the words "or the said section 9 of the Act of 1964". Section 64(5) and (7). Section 65. In section 75(4), the words from ", or," to "must be made". Section 75(8).
1967 c. 50	Farm and Garden Chemicals Act 1967	Section 1(5).
1970 c. 40	Agriculture Act 1970	Section 34. Section 87(1). Section 102. In section 111(2), the words from "(other" to "thereof)".
1972 c. 62	Agriculture (Miscellaneous Provisions) Act 1972	Section 4. Section 8(5). Section 11. In section 12(3), paragraphs (a) and (c) and the word "and" before paragraph (c). Section 14. Section 17(1). Section 21. Section 27(2) and (3). In section 27(4), the words from "13" to "7," and the words "1, 2 and".
1973 c. 39	Statute Law (Repeals) Act 1973	In Schedule 2, paragraph 4.
1973 c. 65	Local Government (Scotland) Act 1973	In Schedule 27, in Part 2, paragraph 205.
1974 c. 5	Horticulture (Special Payments) Act 1974	The whole act.
1975 c. 76	Local Land Charges Act 1975	In Schedule 1, the entry relating to the Hill Farming Act 1954.
1976 c. 55	Agriculture (Miscellaneous Provisions) Act 1976	Section 1. In section 3(4), the words from "but those amendments" to the end. In section 26(1), the words "(and in the Sugar Act 1956)". Section 27(2) to (4). In section 27(5), the words "2," and "and Part II of this Act", and from "and sections 13" to the end. In section 27(6)(a), the word "1,".
1979 c. 13	Agricultural Statistics Act 1979	Section 2. In section 3(1), the words "or 2". In section 3(2), paragraph (e). In section 4(1) and (2), the words "or 2". Section 8(2).
1981 c. 67	Acquisition of Land Act 1981	In Schedule 4, in paragraph 1, the entry in the Table for section 92(1) of the Agriculture Act 1947, and paragraph 3.
1982 c. 5	Hops Marketing Act 1982	The whole act.
1983 c. 3	Agricultural Marketing Act 1983	In section 4(2), paragraph (b). In section 9(2), the words "Subject to paragraph 3 of Schedule 2 to this Act,". Section 9(3). In Schedule 2, paragraph 3.
1984 c. 20	Agriculture (Amendment) Act 1984	Section 2(2). Section 3(2).
1985 c. 4	Milk (Cessation of Production) Act 1985	Section 7(2).
1985 c. 48	Food and Environment Protection Act 1985	Section 27.
1986 c. 5	Agricultural Holdings Act 1986	In Schedule 14, paragraph 19.
1986 c. 20	Horticultural Produce Act 1986	Section 7(2) and (3).
1986 c. 49	Agriculture Act 1986	Section 4(4). Section 5(1). Section 8(5) and (6). Sections 9 and 10. Section 12. In section 24(2), the words "10, 13 to 16", "to 10" and from "and the remaining" to "is passed". In section 24(6), the words "and 21". In section 24(7), the words "9, 10,".
1990 c. 16	Food Safety Act 1990	In Schedule 3, paragraph 15.
S.I. 1991/1997	Companies Act 1989 (Eligibility for Appointment as Company Auditor) (Consequential Amendments) Regulations 1991	In the Schedule, paragraph 6.
1993 c. 37	Agriculture Act 1993	Section 21(2) and (3). Sections 25 to 35. Sections 37 to 45. Section 47. Section 59. Section 62(5). Section 64(2). Schedule 3.
1994 c. 26	Trade Marks Act 1994	In Schedule 4, in paragraph 1(2), the entry for the Horticulture Act 1960.
1996 c. 18	Employment Rights Act 1996	In Schedule 1, paragraph 17.
Group 2 – General Repeals
11 & 12 Geo. 6 c. 47	Agricultural Wages Act 1948	Section 20(4) to (6).
4 & 5 Eliz. 2 c. 49	Agriculture (Safety, Health and Welfare Provisions) Act 1956	Section 7.
1964 c. 14	Plant Varieties and Seeds Act 1964	Section 26(10). In section 31(1), the words from ", except" to "Part of this Act,". Section 41(2).
1982 c. 9	Agricultural Training Board Act 1982	The whole act.
1985 c. 36	Agricultural Training Board Act 1985	The whole act.
1987 c. 29	Agricultural Training Board Act 1987	The whole act.
1988 c. 19	Employment Act 1988	In section 29(1), the words from "and the same" to the end. In Schedule 3, paragraph 13.
1988 c. 40	Education Reform Act 1988	In Schedule 12, paragraph 86.
1989 c. 38	Employment Act 1989	In Schedule 6, paragraph 28.
1990 c. 35	Enterprise and New Towns (Scotland) Act 1990	In Schedule 4, paragraph 10.
S.I. 1991/1997	Companies Act 1989 (Eligibility for Appointment as Company Auditor) (Consequential Amendments) Regulations 1991	In the Schedule, paragraph 43.
1992 c. 52	Trade Union and Labour Relations (Consolidation) Act 1992	In Schedule 2, paragraph 27.
1993 c. 19	Trade Union Reform and Employment Rights Act 1993	In Schedule 8, paragraph 33.
1996 c. 56	Education Act 1996	In Schedule 37, paragraph 53.

==== Part 3 — Allotments and smallholdings ====
Part 3 — Allotments and smallholdings
Citation	Short title	Extent of repeal
6 & 7 Geo. 5 c. 38	Small Holding Colonies Act 1916	The whole act.
6 & 7 Geo. 5 c. 60	Sailors and Soldiers (Gifts for Land Settlement) Act 1916	In section 1(1), the proviso.
9 & 10 Geo. 5 c. 59	Land Settlement (Facilities) Act 1919	Section 11. In Schedule 2, the entries relating to sections 9, 23, 24, 27(1), 34, 49(3) and 58.
16 & 17 Geo. 5 c. 52	Small Holdings and Allotments Act 1926	Sections 1 to 4. Section 13(3) and (4). Section 19. In Schedule 1, the entries relating to sections 11 and 18 of the Land Settlement (Facilities) Act 1919.
21 & 22 Geo. 5 c. 41	Agricultural Land (Utilisation) Act 1931	In Schedule 2, the entries relating to the Small Holdings and Allotments Act 1908 and section 2 of the Small Holdings and Allotments Act 1926.
10 & 11 Geo. 6 c. 48	Agriculture Act 1947	Sections 58 and 59. In Schedule 8, in Part 2, the entry relating to section 2 of the Small Holdings and Allotments Act 1926.
14 Geo. 6 c. 31	Allotments Act 1950	In section 6, the words from "and in any document" to the end.
2 & 3 Eliz. 2 c. 39	Agriculture (Miscellaneous Provisions) Act 1954	Section 3.
1970 c. 40	Agriculture Act 1970	In section 52, subsections (1) and (2)(b), in subsection (2)(c) the words "or section 58 of the Agriculture Act 1947", subsections (3) and (4), and in subsection (5) the words "and in subsection" to the end. In Schedule 3, paragraph 8.
1972 c. 70	Local Government Act 1972	In Schedule 29, paragraph 11.
1981 c. 67	Acquisition of Land Act 1981	In section 1(2), the words "section 4 of the Small Holdings and Allotments Act 1926,".
1986 c. 5	Agricultural Holdings Act 1986	In Schedule 14, paragraph 7.

==== Part 4 — Aviation ====
Part 4 — Aviation
Citation	Short title	Extent of repeal
9 & 10 Eliz. 2 c. 27	Carriage by Air Act 1961	Section 14(3).
10 & 11 Eliz. 2 c. 43	Carriage by Air (Supplementary Provisions) Act 1962	In section 2(1), the words from "but, in relation" to the end. In section 3(3), the words from "and in section" to "provisions)". Section 4. Section 5(3) and (4). Section 6(2). Section 7(2) and (3).
1966 c. 11	Air Corporations Act 1966	The whole act.
1969 c. 43	Air Corporations Act 1969	The whole act.
1975 c. 25	Northern Ireland Assembly Disqualification Act 1975	In Part 3 of Schedule 1, the entry "Director of the successor company (within the meaning of the Airports Act 1986) being a director nominated or appointed by a Minister of the Crown or by a person acting on behalf of the Crown".
1979 c. 28	Carriage by Air and Road Act 1979	In Schedule 2, paragraph 5.
1980 c. 60	Civil Aviation Act 1980	Section 2. Section 3(2) and (7). Section 8(8) and (9). Section 9. Section 10(3). Sections 27 and 28. In Schedule 3, Part 2.
1982 c. 1	Civil Aviation (Amendment) Act 1982	The whole act.
1982 c. 16	Civil Aviation Act 1982	In Schedule 14, paragraph 12. In Schedule 15, paragraphs 6 and 16.
1982 c. 36	Aviation Security Act 1982	Section 36(1) and (3). In Schedule 2, paragraph 8.
1986 c. 31	Airports Act 1986	Sections 1 to 3. Section 4(1) to (4). Section 5. Section 9. Section 11. Section 53(5). Section 57(3). In section 75(1), the words "1 or" and "in the case of a scheme under section 15". In section 75(2), the words "1 or". In section 75(3) and (5), the words "1(8) or". In sections 75(6) and 76(3)(a), the words "1 or". In section 79(2)(a), the words "2(2) or". In section 79(5), the words "or 85(5)". Section 85(2) to (6). In Schedule 5, paragraphs 7 to 9.
1986 c. 38	Outer Space Act 1986	Section 15(2) to (4).
1990 c. 31	Aviation and Maritime Security Act 1990	Section 3(2). Section 54(2). In Schedule 3, paragraph 3.

==== Part 5 — Defunct bodies ====
Part 5 — Defunct bodies
Citation	Short title	Extent of repeal
Group 1 – Armed Forces
5 & 6 Will. 4 c. 62	Statutory Declarations Act 1835	In section 2, the words "the accountant general of the navy".
3 Edw. 7 c. 20	Patriotic Fund Reorganisation Act 1903	Section 3(1) and (2).
1981 c. 55	Armed Forces Act 1981	Section 24(1).
Group 2 – Children
1983 c. 41	Health and Social Services and Social Security Adjudications Act 1983	Section 27. Section 33(1)(e).
Group 3 – Civil Rights and Liberties
1976 c. 74	Race Relations Act 1976	Section 43(5). In Schedule 2, paragraphs 2 to 10.
1999 c. 17	Disability Rights Commission Act 1999	Section 1(4).
Group 4 – Education
1988 c. 40	Education Reform Act 1988	Section 136. Section 162. Sections 164 and 165. Section 169. Section 171. Sections 175 to 178. Sections 182 to 184. Section 186. Sections 188 to 191. Sections 193 and 194. In section 230, the words "section 190(5);".
1992 c. 13	Further and Higher Education Act 1992	Section 64. Section 80. In Schedule 8, paragraph 37.
1998 c. 18	Audit Commission Act 1998	In Schedule 3, paragraphs 16 and 17.
Group 5 – Electricity
1989 c. 29	Electricity Act 1989	Sections 84 to 89. Section 91(2). Section 92. In Schedule 17, paragraphs 29 to 31.
Group 6 – Fisheries
1981 c. 29	Fisheries Act 1981	Section 13(1). In section 13(2), the words from "with respect" to the end. In Schedule 3, paragraphs 4 to 7.
Group 7 – Gas
1986 c. 44	Gas Act 1986	Section 50(3) to (5). Section 57.
Group 8 – Mines, Minerals and Quarries
1994 c. 21	Coal Industry Act 1994	Section 24.
Group 9 – National Health Service
54 & 55 Vict. c. 24	Public Accounts and Charges Act 1891	Section 1(1).
1980 c. 53	Health Services Act 1980	Section 8(1) and (2). In section 8(3), the words from the beginning to "this section". Section 9(1)(a) and (2) to (5)(b). Schedule 2.
1988 c. 49	Health and Medicines Act 1988	Section 1(1) to (13). Section 3.
1999 c. 8	Health Act 1999	Section 25.
Group 10 – National Heritage
1980 c. 17	National Heritage Act 1980	Section 15.
1983 c. 47	National Heritage Act 1983	Section 39.
Group 11 – Northern Ireland
1978 c. 23	Judicature (Northern Ireland) Act 1978	Section 69(5).
1998 c. 47	Northern Ireland Act 1998	Section 72.
Group 12 – Pensions and Superannuation
1967 c. 13	Parliamentary Commissioner Act 1967	In Schedule 2, the reference to the Occupational Pensions Board.
1972 c. 11	Superannuation Act 1972	Section 27. In section 30(5)(f), the reference to section 27.
1984 c. 7	Pensions Commutation Act 1984	Section 1(1) and (8).
1987 c. 3	Coal Industry Act 1987	Section 7(5).
1993 c. 48	Pension Schemes Act 1993	In Schedule 8, paragraph 19.
1995 c. 26	Pensions Act 1995	Section 150. In section 178(2), the words "150,".
Group 13 – Ports and Harbours
1981 c. 56	Transport Act 1981	Section 15(1) to (4). In section 15(5), the words "this section and". In section 16(1), the words "after making" to the end. Section 16(2)(a) and (b). In section 16(2)(c), the words "4(3) or (5), 7,". Section 16(3). In Schedule 5, paragraphs 1 to 4, 6(2) and (3), 7 and 12.
Group 14 – Railways
1980 c. 34	Transport Act 1980	Section 45(4). Section 46(1) to (3). Sections 47 and 48. Sections 66 and 67. In section 70(3)(c), the words "66 to". In section 70(7)(b), the words "and 66(2)". In Schedule 6, paragraph 1(2), and in paragraph 1(3), the words "or (2)", and paragraph 4(3) and (4).
1985 c. 9	Companies Consolidation (Consequential Provisions) Act 1985	In Schedule 2, the entry in respect of the Transport Act 1980.
1993 c. 43	Railways Act 1993	Section 3(1).
Group 15 – Road Traffic
1985 c. 67	Transport Act 1985	Section 54(3)(a) to (c), (4) and (5). Section 55. Section 117(3).
Group 16 – Savings Banks
1985 c. 58	Trustee Savings Banks Act 1985	Section 2. Section 4(1) and(2). In section 4(6), from the beginning to "Act 1863 and,".
Group 17 – Shipping and Navigation
1987 c. 21	Pilotage Act 1987	Section 24(1) to (10) and (12). Section 25(8). Section 26. Section 28. Section 29(1) to (4).
Group 18 – Taxation
1982 c. 39	Finance Act 1982	Section 156.
1989 c. 26	Finance Act 1989	Section 182(3)(c).
Group 19 – Telecommunications, Broadcasting and Films
1984 c. 12	Telecommunications Act 1984	Section 89.
1985 c. 21	Films Act 1985	Section 1(1) and (2). Section 3(1).
1990 c. 42	Broadcasting Act 1990	Section 128(2) to (5). In Schedule 10, paragraph 4.
Group 20 – Weights and Measures
1985 c. 72	Weights and Measures Act 1985	Section 55. Section 62(1) and (2)(c).

==== Part 6 — Ecclesiastical ====
Part 6 — Ecclesiastical
Citation	Short title	Extent of repeal
Group 1 – Clergy, Benefices and Pastoral Schemes
44 Geo. 3 c. 43	Clergy Ordination Act 1804	Preamble.
1 & 2 Vict. c. 106	Pluralities Act 1838	Sections 28 to 31.
4 & 5 Vict. c. 14	Trading Partnerships Act 1841	The whole act.
34 & 35 Vict. c. 45	Sequestration Act 1871	In section 2, the words "as if they were here re-enacted".
15 & 16 Geo. 6 & 1 Eliz. 2 c. xxxviii	City of London (Guild Churches) Act 1952	In the preamble, from "And whereas it is expedient that reorganisation schemes" to "made by such schemes". In section 3(1), the interpretation of the expressions "reorganisation scheme" and "supplementary reorganisation scheme". In section 4(1), the proviso. In section 22(4), the first sentence. Section 33. Section 36(1). In section 36(2), the words from the beginning to "section".
8 & 9 Eliz. 2 c. xxx	City of London (Guild Churches) Act 1960	In section 5(2), the words from "or within" to "then vacant". Section 5(8). Section 6(4) to (6).
No. 1	Ecclesiastical Jurisdiction Measure 1963	In section 6(1)(d), the words "or under section twenty-eight" to "duties therein". In Schedule 4, the entries relating to the Pluralities Act 1838 and the Benefices (Purchase of Rights of Patronage) Measure 1933.
No. 6	Clergy (Ordination and Miscellaneous Provisions) Measure 1964	Section 1(2). Sections 11 and 12.
No. 3	Church of England (Miscellaneous Provisions) Measure 1976	Section 1(5). Section 2(3). Section 7. Section 8(3).
No. 1	Pastoral Measure 1983	In Schedule 8, paragraphs 1, 2, 4 to 8 and 11 (except as they extend to the Isle of Man).
No. 2	Church of England (Miscellaneous Provisions) Measure 1983	Section 8(11) and (12). Section 12. Section 13(3).
Group 2 – Property — (1) Endowments and Administration of Property
6 & 7 Will. 4 c. 77	Ecclesiastical Commissioners Act 1836	Preamble. Sections 9 and 10. Sections 12 to 17.
1 & 2 Vict. c. 20	Queen Anne's Bounty Act 1838	The whole act.
3 & 4 Vict. c. 113	Ecclesiastical Commissioners Act 1840	Section 83. Section 87. Sections 89 and 90.
4 & 5 Vict. c. 39	Ecclesiastical Commissioners Act 1841	Section 1. Section 30.
13 & 14 Vict. c. 94	Ecclesiastical Commissioners Act 1850	Section 24. Section 28.
28 & 29 Vict. c. 69	Parsonages Act 1865	In section 4, the words from "contained in" to "any other form".
29 & 30 Vict. c. 111	Ecclesiastical Commissioners Act 1866	In section 1, the words from ", unless" to the end.
26 Geo. 5 & 1 Edw. 8 No. 5	Ecclesiastical Commissioners (Powers) Measure 1936	In section 2(3), paragraph (c) (leaving in "and" at the end).
5 & 6 Geo. 6 No. 1	Ecclesiastical Commissioners (Powers) Measure 1942	The whole measure.
6 & 7 Geo. 6 No. 2	Episcopal Endowments and Stipends Measure 1943	In section 1(1), the proviso. In section 8(1), in the definition of "the bishop", the words "except in the proviso to subsection (1) of section 1".
10 & 11 Geo. 6 No. 2	Church Commissioners Measure 1947	Section 15(1) and (2). In section 17(1), the words from "Ecclesiastical Commissioners (Superannuation)"to "1933, and the".
2 & 3 Eliz. 2 No. 1	New Housing Areas (Church Buildings) Measure 1954	Section 2.
No. 8	Church Commissioners Measure 1964	Section 2(3). Section 3.
No. 1	Church Commissioners (Miscellaneous Provisions) Measure 1975	Section 1(2).
Group 2 – Property — (2) General Repeals
1 & 2 Geo. 6 No. 3	Parsonages Measure 1938	Section 21.
6 & 7 Geo. 6 No. 1	New Parishes Measure 1943	Section 17(2).
1 & 2 Eliz. 2 No. 2	Diocesan Stipends Funds Measure 1953	Section 10. Section 11(2).
8 & 9 Eliz. 2 No. 1	Church Property (Miscellaneous Provisions) Measure 1960	Section 15. In section 18, the words from "whether before" to the end. Section 22. In section 24(1), the words "then, after the passing of this Measure,".
1969 c. 22	Redundant Churches and other Religious Buildings Act 1969	Section 3. Section 7(3).
No. 2	Repair of Benefice Buildings Measure 1972	Section 32. In Schedule 1, paragraphs 1(a), (c) and (e), 2(2), (3), (5), (6) and (8) and 3.
No. 4	Endowments and Glebe Measure 1976	Section 6(2). Section 10(1) and (2). Section 13. Section 38(1). Section 49(2). In Schedule 6, paragraphs 2 and 3(1).
No. 3	Church of England (Miscellaneous Provisions) Measure 1978	Section 3(2). Section 12. Section 13(4).
Group 3 – Tithes
11 & 12 Geo. 5 c. 20	Tithe Annuities Apportionment Act 1921	The whole act.
26 Geo. 5 & 1 Edw. 8 c. 43	Tithe Act 1936	Section 1. Section 4. Section 6. Section 21. Sections 32 and 33. Section 36(1). Sections 39 to 42. Section 44. In section 47(1), the definitions of "contingent rentcharge", "district" and "prescribed". Section 47(4). Schedule 2.
14 & 15 Geo. 6 c. 62	Tithe Act 1951	Section 8. Section 10(1) to (3). In section 10(5), the words from ", and subsection (1)" to the end. Section 10(7) and (8). Section 12(3) and (4). Schedule 2.
1963 c. 11	Agriculture (Miscellaneous Provisions) Act 1963	Section 16. In section 29(2), the words ", except in section 5,". In section 29(3), the references to sections 16(2) and 19. In section 29(4), the words from "subsections" to "section 5 and" and from "13" to "19,".
1963 c. 14	Corn Rents Act 1963	Section 3(4) to (6). Schedule.
1977 c. 36	Finance Act 1977	Section 56. In Schedule 9, Part 5.
1989 c. 26	Finance Act 1989	Section 185.
1996 c. 23	Arbitration Act 1996	In Schedule 3, paragraph 3.
Group 4 – The Church in Wales
4 & 5 Geo. 5 c. 91	Welsh Church Act 1914	In section 3(4), the words from "the Church Discipline" to "1872, or", and the word "other". In section 4(1), the words ", save as by this section provided,". Section 4(2). In section 6, provisos (b) to (d). Section 7. Section 8(3). Sections 10 to 12. Sections 14 to 18. Section 20. Section 22(1). Section 24(1). Section 26. In section 27(1), the references to the Welsh Commissioners. Section 27(3). Section 29(1) to (3). Sections 30 to 32. Section 33(3) and (4). Section 34. In section 35(1), the words "the Welsh Commissioners,". In section 38(1), the paragraph commencing "The expressions "first fruits"". Schedules 3 to 5.
9 & 10 Geo. 5 c. 65	Welsh Church (Temporalities) Act 1919	Section 1. Sections 3 to 5.
Group 5 – General Repeals
7 Anne c. 14	Parochial Libraries Act 1708	In section 2, the words from the beginning to "shall think fit". In section 5, the words from the beginning to "and nine". Sections 6 and 7. In section 10, the words from "in case any book" to the end.
7 Will. 4 & 1 Vict. c. 45	Parish Notices Act 1837	The whole act.
36 & 37 Vict. c. 50	Places of Worship Sites Act 1873	In section 3, from "and where any married woman" to "without any acknowledgement thereof".
15 & 16 Geo. 5 No. 1	Interpretation Measure 1925	Section 4.
No. 1	Ecclesiastical Jurisdiction Measure 1963	Section 82. Section 88.
1966 c. 2	Church of England Convocations Act 1966	In section 1(2), the words from "(or in the case" to "six years)".
No. 2	Synodical Government Measure 1969	Section 3(8). Section 7(3) (except as it extends to the Isle of Man). In section 9(2), the words from "the appointed day" to "Laity, and". In section 9(4), the words ", and so much of Schedule 4 as relates to these provisions,". In Schedule 4, paragraphs 1(2), 2(3), 2(4), 3(2), 3(3), 4(1), 4(2), 5 and 6.
No. 1	Dioceses Measure 1978	Section 9(8). Section 15(1) and (2). Section 25(2).
No. 2	Parochial Registers and Records Measure 1978	Section 23. Section 27(2).
1999 c. 22	Access to Justice Act 1999	In Schedule 10, paragraph 1.

==== Part 7 — Education ====
Part 7 — Education
Citation	Short title	Extent of repeal
17 & 18 Vict. c. 81	Oxford University Act 1854	Section 5. In section 48, the words from "the Word "Scholarship"" to "appropriated to any College in Scotland; and".
19 & 20 Vict. c. 88	Cambridge University Act 1856	In section 5, the words from the beginning to "shall be called" and the words ", and which". In section 17, the words from "and to revise" to "the Commissioners,".
31 & 32 Vict. c. 118	Public Schools Act 1868	Section 20(1) to (4), (11), (12), (14) and (15). Section 21.
40 & 41 Vict. c. 48	Universities of Oxford and Cambridge Act 1877	In section 2, the definitions other than those of "College" and "Office". Section 24. Section 57.
13 & 14 Geo. 5 c. 33	Universities of Oxford and Cambridge Act 1923	Section 5.
15 & 16 Geo. 5 c. 24	Universities and College Estates Act 1925	Section 32(2)(a).
10 & 11 Geo. 6 c. 19	Polish Resettlement Act 1947	Section 6. Section 11(4).
1980 c. 30	Social Security Act 1980	In Schedule 4, in paragraph 1(2), the words ", 6(1)".
1988 c. 40	Education Reform Act 1988	Section 121(1) to (3). Section 137. Section 138(1)(c) and the word "and" immediately preceding it. Section 201. In section 230(1), the words "section 201(5) and (7);". Section 236(1), (4) and (5). In Schedule 12, paragraphs 52, 65 and 90.
1997 c. 44	Education Act 1997	Sections 33 and 34. Section 37.
1998 c. 31	School Standards and Framework Act 1998	Section 122(2). Section 131(2). Section 132(2) to (4) and (6). Section 133. Section 134(2).

==== Part 8 — Employment ====
Part 8 — Employment
Citation	Short title	Extent of repeal
54 Geo. 3 c. 96	Apprentices Act 1814	The whole act.
1 & 2 Geo. 6 c. 70	Holidays with Pay Act 1938	The whole act.
1973 c. 50	Employment and Training Act 1973	Section 12(6). Section 15(2). In section 15(3), the words from ", except" to "1970,". In Schedule 3, paragraphs 1, 2, 8 and 11(1).
1975 c. 71	Employment Protection Act 1975	Section 111(1). In section 124(5), the words "the Maternity Pay Fund,". In Schedule 13, paragraphs 5 and 7. In Schedule 14, paragraph 6. In Schedule 15, paragraphs 1, 4, 5, 7, 8, 10, 11, 14, 16(4), 18, 20 and 21.
1977 c. 8	Job Release Act 1977	The whole act.
1978 c. 6	Employment Subsidies Act 1978	The whole act.
1981 c. 57	Employment and Training Act 1981	Section 9(1). In section 11(4), the words in parentheses. In Schedule 2, paragraphs 5, 10, 11, 13 and 16.
1982 c. 10	Industrial Training Act 1982	Section 20(2). In Schedule 2, paragraphs 1 to 5.
1982 c. 46	Employment Act 1982	The whole act.
1989 c. 13	Dock Work Act 1989	Sections 1 to 5. Section 7(2). In Schedule 2, paragraphs 1, 3, 4(4), 4(5), 8 and 9.
1989 c. 38	Employment Act 1989	Section 3(2). Section 8(1)(c) and the word "or" preceding it. Section 9(1) to (6)(a). Section 21. Section 30(2) to (4). In Schedule 2, Part 1 and paragraphs 1 and 2 of Part 2. In Schedule 3, Parts 1 and 2. In Schedule 4, paragraphs 1(2), 1(3), 5, 6(4), 8, 9, 10(2)(b), 12(3), 13(4), 14 and 16(2). In Schedule 5, paragraphs 4(1), 6 and 10. In Schedule 6, paragraph 27.
1993 c. 19	Trade Union Reform and Employment Rights Act 1993	Section 34(3) and (6). Section 35. In Schedule 8, paragraph 68. In Schedule 9, paragraph 2.
1996 c. 18	Employment Rights Act 1996	In Schedule 2, paragraph 15.
1998 c. 8	Employment Rights (Dispute Resolution) Act 1998	Section 17(4).
1998 c. 39	National Minimum Wage Act 1998	Section 8(1) to (8) and (12) to (14). In Schedule 2, paragraphs 4(1), 6 and 7(2).
1999 c. 26	Employment Relations Act 1999	Section 28(1) and (2). Section 33(1). In section 33(2), the words from "and subsections (5) and (6)" to the end. Section 33(3)(a). Section 37(2). In Schedule 4, paragraphs 4, 6, 7, 13, 14, 15(a), 17 to 30, 37, 40 and 41. In Schedule 6, paragraphs 2, 3, 5(2), 7(3), 7(4), 9, 10(2), 11(2), 14, 15(2) and 16(2). In Schedule 8, paragraphs 2, 4 and 7.

==== Part 9 — Finance ====
Part 9 — Finance
Citation	Short title	Extent of repeal
Group 1 – Consolidated Fund
17 & 18 Vict. c. 94	Public Revenue and Consolidated Fund Charges Act 1854	In section 1, the words from the beginning to "Consolidated Fund; and". Schedule A.
36 & 37 Vict. c. 57	Consolidated Fund (Permanent Charges Redemption) Act 1873	The whole act.
46 & 47 Vict. c. 1	Consolidated Fund (Permanent Charges Redemption) Act 1883	The whole act.
46 & 47 Vict. c. 55	Revenue Act 1883	The whole act.
1965 c. 2	Administration of Justice Act 1965	In Schedule 1, the entry relating to the Consolidated Fund (Permanent Charges Redemption) Act 1873.
1969 c. 48	Post Office Act 1969	In Schedule 6, the entry in Part 3 relating to section 2 of the Consolidated Fund (Permanent Charges Redemption) Act 1883.
1978 c. 23	Judicature (Northern Ireland) Act 1978	In Schedule 5, the entry in Part 2 relating to the Consolidated Fund (Permanent Charges Redemption) Act 1873.
1983 c. 29	Miscellaneous Financial Provisions Act 1983	Section 6.
Group 2 – Public Revenue and Expenditure
29 & 30 Vict. c. 39	Exchequer and Audit Departments Act 1866	In section 2, the words from " "sub-accountants"" to the end.
47 & 48 Vict. c. 62	Revenue Act 1884	In section 14, the words "; and any pay" to "section twenty-seven of the Exchequer and Audit Departments Act 1866".
61 & 62 Vict. c. 46	Revenue Act 1898	In section 9, the words "Courts of Law Fees (Scotland) Act 1868, and the".
11 & 12 Geo. 5 c. 52	Exchequer and Audit Departments Act 1921	Section 9(1) and (5).
5 & 6 Eliz. 2 c. 45	Exchequer and Audit Departments Act 1957	Section 1(2). Section 2(1).
1968 c. 14	Public Expenditure and Receipts Act 1968	In Schedule 3, the entries relating to the Friendly Societies Act 1974, the Shops Act 1950, the Fees (Increase) Act 1923 and the Sea Fisheries Regulation Act 1966.
1974 c. 46	Friendly Societies Act 1974	In Schedule 9, paragraph 21.
Group 3 – Public Works
38 & 39 Vict. c. 89	Public Works Loans Act 1875	In section 33, the words from ", in like manner" to "pay." and the words from "The Loan Commissioners may issue" to the end of the section. In section 57, the proviso.
45 & 46 Vict. c. 62	Public Works Loans Act 1882	The whole act.
50 & 51 Vict. c. 37	Public Works Loans Act 1887	The whole act.
Group 4 – Finance Acts
12, 13 & 14 Geo. 6 c. 47	Finance Act 1949	Section 47.
2 & 3 Eliz. 2 c. 44	Finance Act 1954	In section 34(3), the words from "and shall be payable" to the end of that subsection. Section 34(4). Section 35(6).
1991 c. 31	Finance Act 1991	Section 120.
Group 5 – Car Tax
1979 c. 58	Isle of Man Act 1979	Section 1(1)(e). Section 7.
1983 c. 53	Car Tax Act 1983	The whole act.
1984 c. 43	Finance Act 1984	Section 16(1).
1984 c. 60	Police and Criminal Evidence Act 1984	In Schedule 6, paragraph 40.
S.I. 1984/488	Car Tax (Vehicles for the Handicapped) Order 1984	The whole order.
1985 c. 9	Companies Consolidation (Consequential Provisions) Act 1985	In Schedule 2, the entry relating to the Car Tax Act 1983.
1985 c. 54	Finance Act 1985	Section 10(6)(h).
1987 c. 18	Debtors (Scotland) Act 1987	In Schedule 4, paragraph 3.
1988 c. 39	Finance Act 1988	Section 12(1)(d) and (5).
1989 c. 26	Finance Act 1989	Section 27.
1991 c. 31	Finance Act 1991	Sections 19 and 20.
1992 c. 20	Finance Act 1992	Section 8.
1992 c. 58	Car Tax (Abolition) Act 1992	The whole act.
1995 c. 40	Criminal Procedure (Consequential Provisions) (Scotland) Act 1995	In Schedule 4, paragraph 47.
Group 6 – General Repeals
54 & 55 Vict. c. 43	Forged Transfers Act 1891	In section 1(1), the words from "whether such loss arises" to "passing of this Act, and". In section 3, the words ", or loan".
55 & 56 Vict. c. 36	Forged Transfers Act 1892	In section 2, the words from "whether such loss arises" to "passing of this Act, and".
19 & 20 Geo. 5 c. 29	Government Annuities Act 1929	In section 36(2), the proviso. In section 66(2), in proviso (a), the words from "and any deferred" to the end. In Schedule 3, Part 1.
1 Edw. 8 & 1 Geo. 6 c. 54	Finance Act 1937	In section 5(1), from the beginning to "accordingly".
1968 c. 13	National Loans Act 1968	Section 17(1). Section 18(1). In Schedule 1, the entries relating to the New Towns Act 1946, the Miscellaneous Financial Provisions Act 1950, the Finance Act 1956, section 20(6) of the Transport Act 1962, the Housing Act 1964 and the Air Corporations Act 1967. In Schedule 5, the entries relating to section 21(1) of the Coal Industry Nationalisation Act 1946 and the Cable and Wireless Act 1946.
1969 c. 48	Post Office Act 1969	Section 108(1)(d).
1974 c. 8	Statutory Corporations (Financial Provisions) Act 1974	In Schedule 2, paragraph 3.
1975 c. 55	Statutory Corporations (Financial Provisions) Act 1975	In Schedule 4, paragraph 4.
1982 c. 41	Stock Transfer Act 1982	In Schedule 2, paragraph 1(1)(c).
1983 c. 44	National Audit Act 1983	Sections 10 and 11. In section 15(2), the words "Subject to subsection (3) below,". Section 15(3).
2000 c. 20	Government Resources and Accounts Act 2000	Section 1(2). Section 2(6). Section 3(4). Section 5(9). Section 6(5). Section 7(6). Section 8(3). Section 21(4). Section 26(3). In Schedule 1, paragraphs 9, 12 and 13.

==== Part 10 — Local government ====
Part 10 — Local government
Citation	Short title	Extent of repeal
Group 1 – Local Government Act 1972
1972 c. 70	Local Government Act 1972	Section 64. Section 74(5) and (6). In section 78(1), the definition of "public body". In section 90, the words from ", or elected" to "parish councillor,". Section 169. Section 190. In section 191(5), the words from the beginning to " "county" in that Act)". Section 197(1) to (3). Section 213(4). In section 219(7), the words "under section 34 of the Sheriffs Act 1887 or otherwise". Section 221. In section 254(2), paragraphs (f) and (g). Sections 257 and 258. Section 261. In section 270(1), the definition of "special community review". Section 271(1). Section 273(5) to (10). In section 274(2), the words before "this Act shall". In Schedule 3, paragraphs 2, 4 to 9, 11, 12(1) after the words "year 1972", 12(2), 12(4) to (7), 12(9)(b) and (c), 12(10)(b) and (c), 12(11), 12(12)(b) and (c), 12(13), 13(3) to (5) and 15 to 17. In Schedule 5, paragraphs 3 to 10. In Schedule 23, paragraph 11. In Schedule 24, paragraphs 1 and 3. Schedule 28. In Schedule 29, paragraphs 9(5), 10(1), 12, 16, 17(2), 26, 35 and 45.
1974 c. 11	Charlwood and Horley Act 1974	Section 2(3).
1994 c. 19	Local Government (Wales) Act 1994	Section 6.
1995 c. 17	Health Authorities Act 1995	In Schedule 1, in Part 3, paragraph 97(3).
Group 2 – Rate Support Grants
1974 c. 7	Local Government Act 1974	Sections 1 to 5. In section 10(1), the words following paragraph (f). Section 10(2), except the words "In this Part of this Act" and the definition of "year". Section 10(3) to (5). Schedule 2.
1976 c. 32	Lotteries and Amusements Act 1976	In Schedule 4, paragraph 9.
1980 c. 65	Local Government, Planning and Land Act 1980	Part 6. Section 69(3). Schedules 8 to 10. In Schedule 32, paragraph 31.
1982 c. 32	Local Government Finance Act 1982	Part 2. Schedule 2.
1985 c. 51	Local Government Act 1985	Section 69. Sections 80 and 81. Section 83. In Schedule 16, paragraph 9.
1986 c. 50	Social Security Act 1986	Section 30. In Schedule 10, paragraph 52.
1986 c. 54	Rate Support Grants Act 1986	The whole act.
1987 c. 5	Rate Support Grants Act 1987	The whole act.
1987 c. 6	Local Government Finance Act 1987	The whole act.
1987 c. 44	Local Government Act 1987	The whole act.
1988 c. 41	Local Government Finance Act 1988	Section 126.
1988 c. 51	Rate Support Grants Act 1988	The whole act.
1989 c. 42	Local Government and Housing Act 1989	Sections 147 and 148. In Schedule 11, paragraph 92.
1996 c. 56	Education Act 1996	In Schedule 37, paragraph 49.
1998 c. 18	Audit Commission Act 1998	In Schedule 3, paragraph 6.
1999 c. 29	Greater London Authority Act 1999	In Schedule 27, paragraphs 38 and 43. In Schedule 29, in Part 1, paragraph 47.
Group 3 – General Repeals
51 & 52 Vict. c. 41	Local Government Act 1888	Section 69. In section 78(3), the words from "and a presentment" to the end. Section 87.
56 & 57 Vict. c. 73	Local Government Act 1894	Section 8(1)(c) and (4). In section 26(2), from "and may with" to the end. Section 26(7).
19 Geo. 5 c. 17	Local Government Act 1929	In section 131(3), the words from "(other than" to "this Act)".
8 & 9 Geo. 6 c. 10	Compensation of Displaced Officers (War Service) Act 1945	The whole act.
6 & 7 Eliz. 2. c. 55	Local Government Act 1958	Section 63.
7 & 8 Eliz. 2 c. 32	Eisteddfod Act 1959	The whole act.
7 & 8 Eliz. 2 c. 53	Town and Country Planning Act 1959	Section 23(4). In section 57(1), in the definition of "grant-aided function," the words "(other than any grant under section 1 of the Local Government Act 1966)".
1966 c. 42	Local Government Act 1966	Section 43. Schedule 5.
1967 c. 49	Llangollen International Musical Eisteddfod Act 1967	The whole act.
1970 c. 42	Local Authority Social Services Act 1970	Section 2(7). Section 6(8). Section 14(4). Section 15(4) and (5). In Schedule 1, the entry relating to section 7(4) of the Family Law Reform Act 1969.
1971 c. 37	Welsh National Opera Company Act 1971	The whole act.
1980 c. 65	Local Government, Planning and Land Act 1980	Section 1(4) and (5). Section 2(7)(a). Schedules 4 and 5.
1982 c. 30	Local Government (Miscellaneous Provisions) Act 1982	Section 11. Section 27(2). Section 39(3). Section 46. In section 49(2), the words "11(2),".
1984 c. 53	Local Government (Interim Provisions) Act 1984	The whole act.
1985 c. 51	Local Government Act 1985	Section 7(2). Section 11(1). Section 14. Section 30. Section 38. Section 48(13). Sections 49 to 51. Sections 55 and 56. Section 57(1) to (6). Section 59. Sections 63 to 65. Sections 78 and 79. Section 82. Sections 85 and 86. Section 87(6). Sections 91 to 93. Sections 95 to 97. Schedule 7. Schedule 15.
1988 c. 50	Housing Act 1988	In Schedule 17, in Part 1, paragraph 79.
1991 c. 9	Community Charges (General Reduction) Act 1991	The whole act.
1992 c. 19	Local Government Act 1992	Sections 23 and 24.
1994 c. 19	Local Government (Wales) Act 1994	Section 26. Section 32. Section 40. Schedule 14.
1998 c. 18	Audit Commission Act 1998	In Schedule 3, paragraphs 8 and 11.

==== Part 11 — Pensions ====
Part 11 — Pensions
Citation	Short title	Extent of repeal
1 & 2 Geo. 6 c. 13	Superannuation (Various Services) Act 1938	In Part 1 of the Schedule, the entries relating to the Development and Road Improvement Funds Act 1910 and the Electricity (Supply) Act 1919.
2 & 3 Geo. 6 c. 82	Personal Injuries (Emergency Provisions) Act 1939	In section 8(1), the definition of "enactment".
6 & 7 Geo. 6 c. 39	Pensions Appeal Tribunals Act 1943	In section 1(3A), the word "the" before the words "any relevant service" where they first appear. In section 10(3), the final paragraph. In the Schedule, in paragraph 5(5), the final paragraph.
12, 13 & 14 Geo. 6 c. 4	Judges Pensions (India and Burma) Act 1948	The whole act.
12, 13 & 14 Geo. 6 c. 45	U.S.A. Veterans' Pensions (Administration) Act 1949	The whole act.
1965 c. 32	Administration of Estates (Small Payments) Act 1965	In Schedule 1, in Part 1, the entry relating to the U.S.A Veterans' Pensions (Administration) Act 1949.
1965 c. 70	Honourable Lady Hylton-Foster's Annuity Act 1965	The whole act.
1971 c. 56	Pensions (Increase) Act 1971	In Schedule 2, in Part 1, in paragraph 3, the words "under the Hon. Lady Hylton-Foster's Annuity Act 1965 or". In Schedule 2, in Part 1, paragraph 28.
1972 c. 48	Parliamentary and other Pensions Act 1972	Section 32.
1975 c. 60	Social Security Pensions Act 1975	Section 61. Section 67. Section 68(4)(f) and (g). In Schedule 4, paragraphs 4, 21, 34 and 65.
1983 c. 20	Mental Health Act 1983	In Schedule 4, paragraph 9.
1991 c. 5	Ministerial and other Pensions and Salaries Act 1991	Section 1(3). Section 7(2).
1996 c. 2	Hong Kong (Overseas Public Servants) Act 1996	Sections 2 and 3. Section 5(5). Section 6(2).
2000 c. 19	Child Support, Pensions and Social Security Act 2000	Section 57(4).

==== Part 12 — Property ====
Part 12 — Property
Citation	Short title	Extent of repeal
15 & 16 Geo. 5 c. 18	Settled Land Act 1925	Section 15. Section 118. Schedule 1. Schedule 4.
15 & 16 Geo. 5 c. 20	Law of Property Act 1925	In section 39, paragraph 6. Section 112. In section 153(4), the proviso. Section 206. In Schedule 1, Part 6. Schedules 5 and 6.
1969 c. 59	Law of Property Act 1969	Section 16. Section 17(2). In section 28(11), paragraphs (a) and (b) and the word "but" preceding them.
1970 c. 31	Administration of Justice Act 1970	Section 36(5). In Schedule 2, paragraphs 26 and 28.
1972 c. 61	Land Charges Act 1972	Section 18(4).
1973 c. 15	Administration of Justice Act 1973	Section 8(5).
1975 c. 76	Local Land Charges Act 1975	Section 20(3). In Schedule 1, the entries relating to the Ancient Monuments Act 1931, the Public Utilities Street Works Act 1950, the Housing Act 1964, the Field Monuments Act 1972, section 24(3) and (4) of the Land Compensation Act 1973 and the Pastoral Measure 1968.
1977 c. 30	Rentcharges Act 1977	Section 17(4) and (5). Section 18(2).
1994 c. 36	Law of Property (Miscellaneous Provisions) Act 1994	In section 9(2), the words "Schedule 1 to the Settled Land Act 1925 and" and "and 5".

==== Part 13 — Public health ====
Part 13 — Public health
Citation	Short title	Extent of repeal
53 & 54 Vict. c. 59	Public Health Acts Amendment Act 1890	In section 9, the words from "except byelaws" to the end. In section 12, paragraph (1).
26 Geo. 5 & 1 Edw. 8 c. 49	Public Health Act 1936	Section 205 from "or, if" to the end. In section 263(1), the words from "within a borough" to "this Act,". In section 264, the words from "within a borough" to "commencement of this Act,". In section 309(3), the words from "without prejudice" to the end.
1 Edw. 8 & 1 Geo. 6 c. 46	Physical Training and Recreation Act 1937	Section 7.
12 & 13 Geo. 6 c. 55	Prevention of Damage by Pests Act 1949	The following provisions as they extend to England and Wales:— In section 3(2), the words from "and the Minister" to the end. Section 8. Sections 18 and 19. Section 25. In section 27(1), paragraph (b). Section 30(2) and (3).
1 & 2 Eliz. 2 c. 26	Local Government (Miscellaneous Provisions) Act 1953	Section 18(3). Section 19(2).
9 & 10 Eliz. 2 c. 64	Public Health Act 1961	Section 86(2).
1971 c. 40	Fire Precautions Act 1971	Sections 33 and 34. Schedule 1.
1972 c. 70	Local Government Act 1972	In Schedule 14, paragraphs 3, 19 and 21, in paragraph 24(d) the words ", and 85", in paragraph 25(2)(c) the words "or 85", and paragraphs 33, 35, 36 and 44. Schedule 15.
1974 c. 40	Control of Pollution Act 1974	In section 109(3), the words "100 and". In Schedule 2, paragraphs 4, 5 and 20. In Schedule 3, paragraphs 1 to 4.
1976 c. 57	Local Government (Miscellaneous Provisions) Act 1976	Section 27(1) and (3). Section 83(2).
1981 c. 43	Disabled Persons Act 1981	Section 6. Section 9(2).
1984 c. 22	Public Health (Control of Disease) Act 1984	In section 5(4), the words from "without prejudice" to the end. Section 79(2). In Schedule 1, paragraph 4.
1984 c. 55	Building Act 1984	In section 11(7), paragraph (b) and the word "or" preceding it. In section 12(10), paragraph (b) and the word "or" preceding it. In Schedule 5, paragraphs 1 and 4. In Schedule 6, paragraphs 9 and 12.
1987 c. 27	Fire Safety and Safety of Places of Sport Act 1987	Section 12(2). Section 15. Section 16(3)(b). Section 22(4), (6) and (8)(d).
1989 c. 14	Control of Pollution (Amendment) Act 1989	Section 11(2).
1990 c. 43	Environmental Protection Act 1990	Section 77(3). In Schedule 13, paragraphs 2(1) and 6. In Schedule 15, paragraph 21.
1993 c. 11	Clean Air Act 1993	In section 30(5), the words from ", except" to "that Act,". Section 68(2).
1995 c. 25	Environment Act 1995	Section 2(3). Section 3(2) to (7). Section 21(3). Section 22(2) to (8). Section 111(1). Section 118(2). In Schedule 22— paragraphs 1(7) and (9), 3(2), 11(c), 12(1)(b), 12(2), 19(4) and 25, in paragraph 29, sub-paragraphs (3), (4)(a), (7), (9)(c), (16), (23), (24), (27), (28), (31), (32) and (34), and paragraphs 34(4), 37(6) and (7), 63, 75, 78, 84, 85, 87, 90, 94, 116, 129, 131, 136 to 138, 146, 148, 149, 152 to 156, 168, 171, 174 to 176, 178, 179, 201, 207, 216, 218, 221, 225, 226 and 229. In Schedule 23, paragraph 5.

==== Part 14 — Road traffic ====
Part 14 — Road traffic
Citation	Short title	Extent of repeal
1 & 2 Will. 4 c. 22	London Hackney Carriage Act 1831	In section 56, the words "or other Peace Officer," and the words from "and after the Conviction" to the end. In section 74, the words "Animal,", "or Animals" and "or Animal".
6 & 7 Vict. c. 86	London Hackney Carriages Act 1843	In section 18, the words "or Peace Officer,". Section 47.
13 & 14 Vict. c. 7	London Hackney Carriages Act 1850	Section 2.
16 & 17 Vict. c. 127	London Hackney Carriage (No.2) Act 1853	The whole act.
24 & 25 Vict. c. 70	Locomotive Act 1861	Section 7.
30 & 31 Vict. c. 134	Metropolitan Streets Act 1867	Sections 19 and 20.
10 & 11 Geo. 5 c. 72	Roads Act 1920	The whole act.
23 & 24 Geo. 5 c. 14	London Passenger Transport Act 1933	Section 5(3). In section 19(8), the words from ", or such later date" to the end. Section 81. Section 89(23).
2 & 3 Eliz. 2 c. 64	Transport Charges etc (Miscellaneous Provisions) Act 1954	Section 11.
4 & 5 Eliz. 2 c. 6	Miscellaneous Financial Provisions Act 1955	Section 4(1) and (3).
8 & 9 Eliz. 2 c. 16	Road Traffic Act 1960	In section 232(2), the words from "In this subsection" to the end. Sections 248 and 249. Section 266. Section 270. Schedule 20.
10 & 11 Eliz. 2 c. 59	Road Traffic Act 1962	The whole act.
1967 c. 76	Road Traffic Regulation Act 1967	The whole act.
1968 c. 7	London Cab Act 1968	Section 3(1). Section 5(2).
1968 c. 14	Public Expenditure and Receipts Act 1968	In Schedule 3, the entry relating to section 249(1)(d) of the Road Traffic Act 1960.
1968 c. 73	Transport Act 1968	Section 32. Section 139. Section 145. In section 157, the words from ", except" to "124,". Section 161. Schedule 8.
1974 c. 30	Finance Act 1974	Section 55.
1974 c. 35	Carriage of Passengers by Road Act 1974	The whole act.
1974 c. 50	Road Traffic Act 1974	Section 23(1).
1976 c. 3	Road Traffic (Drivers' Ages and Hours of Work) Act 1976	Section 2(4). Section 4(2) to (4).
1979 c. 28	Carriage by Air and Road Act 1979	Section 3(4). Section 4(3). In section 4(4), the words ", 13 or 16" and from "and, in a case falling" to the end. In section 5(1), the words "and 19". In section 6(1), paragraph (c) and the word "and" preceding it. Section 6(4)(b).
1980 c. 34	Transport Act 1980	Section 62(2). Schedule 4.
1981 c. 14	Public Passenger Vehicles Act 1981	Section 69(3). Section 89(3).
1982 c. 27	Civil Jurisdiction and Judgments Act 1982	In section 31(3), the words "or section 5 of the Carriage of Passengers by Road Act 1974". In section 32(4)(b), the words ", section 5 of the Carriage of Passengers by Road Act 1974".
1983 c. 10	Transport Act 1983	Section 10.
1983 c. 14	International Transport Conventions Act 1983	In Schedule 2, paragraph 3.
1984 c. 27	Road Traffic Regulation Act 1984	Section 145. Schedule 2. In Schedule 10, paragraphs 18 and 20. In Schedule 13, paragraphs 2, 5 and 39.
1984 c. 54	Roads (Scotland) Act 1984	In Schedule 9, paragraph 24.
1985 c. 67	Transport Act 1985	Section 32. Section 114(3). Section 117(3). In section 135(1), the words from "and in subsection (2)" to the end. Section 139(5). In Schedule 1, paragraphs 6, 7, 9, 10, 12 and 14. In Schedule 3, paragraphs 1, 5, 9 to 11, 14, 24 to 28 and 32. In Schedule 6, paragraphs 1 to 5, in paragraph 6(1) the definitions "relevant authority" and "the transitional period", paragraphs 8 to 12, 14, 16 to 18, 20, 22 and 24. In Schedule 7, paragraphs 4, 5, 11, 16 and 26.
1988 c. 52	Road Traffic Act 1988	Sections 67A and 67B. In section 172(1)(c), the words from "except" to "1989,".
1988 c. 53	Road Traffic Offenders Act 1988	Section 27(4) as it extends to Scotland. Section 30 as it extends to Scotland. Section 52(4). Section 59. Section 99(5). In Schedule 1, paragraphs 2(c), 3(bb) and 4(aa) and, in the table, the entry for section 99 of the Road Traffic Act 1988. In Schedule 2, in Part 1, the heading "Offences under the Road Traffic (Driver Licensing and Information Systems) Act 1989" and the entries thereunder relating to that Act. In Schedule 5, the heading "Offences under the Road Traffic (Driver Licensing and Information Systems) Act 1989" and the entries thereunder relating to that Act.
1989 c. 22	Road Traffic (Driver Licensing and Information Systems) Act 1989	Section 1(2) to 1(6). In section 1(7), the words "and in subsection (2)" to the end. Schedule 1. In Schedule 3, paragraphs 1, 7, 10, 13, 17, 25, 27(a) to (c), 29 and 30(d).
1991 c. 40	Road Traffic Act 1991	Section 31. Section 49.
1992 c. 42	Transport and Works Act 1992	Section 50.
1995 c. 23	Goods Vehicles (Licensing of Operators) Act 1995	Section 56. In Schedule 6, paragraph 6. In Schedule 7, paragraphs 2, 4, 13 and 14.
1999 c. 12	Road Traffic (Vehicle Testing) Act 1999	Section 6.
1999 c. 29	Greater London Authority Act 1999	In Schedule 20, paragraphs 4 and 13.
2000 c. 38	Transport Act 2000	Section 269. Section 275(3).

==== Part 15 — Scottish Acts ====
Part 15 — Scottish Acts
Citation	Short title	Extent of repeal
34 & 35 Vict. c. xvii	Shotts Iron Company's Act 1871	The whole act.
36 & 37 Vict. c. xcix	Bank of Scotland Act 1873	Sections 4 to 9.
39 & 40 Vict. c. lxxv	Western Bank of Scotland (Liquidation) Act 1876	The whole act.
40 & 41 Vict. c. xviii	Shotts Iron Company's Act 1877	The whole act.
3 Edw. 7 c. clvii	Scottish American Mortgage Company Limited Act 1903	The whole act.
21 & 22 Geo. 5 c. xxvi	Scottish United Investors Limited Order Confirmation Act 1931	The whole act.
1963 c. 15	Fort William Pulp and Paper Mills Act 1963	The whole act.

==== Part 16 — Trade and industry ====
Part 16 — Trade and industry
Citation	Short title	Extent of repeal
Group 1 – Particular Industries
9 & 10 Geo. 6 c. 80	Atomic Energy Act 1946	Section 20(3).
2 & 3 Eliz. 2 c. 32	Atomic Energy Authority Act 1954	In section 6(5), the words from ", and the Public" to the end. Section 9(5). In Schedule 2, paragraph 3.
1964 c. 69	Scrap Metal Dealers Act 1964	Section 8. Section 10(1). In section 10(2), the words from the beginning to "subsection,". Section 11(2).
1964 c. 89	Hairdressers (Registration) Act 1964	In section 2, the words "before the appointed day establish and thereafter". In section 3(1), the words from "after such date" to "this section". Section 3(2). In section 7(1), the words "within six months of the appointed day and" and the word "thereafter". In section 15, the definition of "the appointed day". In Schedule 1, in paragraph 1(1), 1(2) and 1(5), the words "(subject to the provisions of paragraph 2 of this Schedule)". In Schedule 1, paragraphs 2, 5 and 6(3).
1971 c. 11	Atomic Energy Authority Act 1971	Section 5(1) to (4). In section 5(5), the words "Subject to the next following subsection,". Section 5(6). In section 5(7), the words "giving any direction or" in both places where they appear. Section 5(8). In section 6(3), the words from "; and any legal proceedings" to the end. Section 7. Section 8(5). In section 8(6), the words "or subsection (5)". Section 9(2) to (4). Section 11(1) and (2). Section 17(3). In section 24(2), the words from "and different days" to the end.
1973 c. 4	Atomic Energy Authority (Weapons Group) Act 1973	Section 3(1) to (3). In section 3(4), the words "Subject to the next following subsection," and the words from "but the issue" to the end. In section 3(5), the words "giving any direction or" in both places where they appear. In section 4(2), the words from "; and any legal proceedings" to the end.
1975 c. 25	Northern Ireland Assembly Disqualification Act 1975	In Part 3 of Schedule 1, the entry "Director of the successor company (within the meaning of the British Steel Act 1988) being a director nominated or appointed by a Minister of the Crown or by a person acting on behalf of the Crown".
1977 c. 3	Aircraft and Shipbuilding Industries Act 1977	Section 1(9). Section 10(2). In section 12(4), the word "two" and the words "one relating to British Aerospace and the other". Section 18(5). Sections 21 to 39. Section 41. Sections 50 and 51. In section 54(2)(c), the words from "except" to "applies," and the word "or". Section 54(2)(d). In section 56(1), the entries for "industrial or intellectual property", "initial date", "know how", "lease", "notice of acquisition", "operate", "safeguarding date" and "Schedule 4 notice". Schedules 4 to 6.
1980 c. 26	British Aerospace Act 1980	Section 1(2) and (4). Sections 2 and 3. Sections 5 to 8. In section 9(2), paragraph (b) and the preceding "and". Section 10(2) to (10). Section 11. Section 14(2) and (3). In section 15(2), from the beginning to "Schedule 2 to this Act,". Schedule 2.
1983 c. 15	British Shipbuilders Act 1983	Section 1(2) and (4). Section 2(2). Section 3(4).
1983 c. 58	British Shipbuilders (Borrowing Powers) Act 1983	Section 1(2).
1985 c. 9	Companies Consolidation (Consequential Provisions) Act 1985	In Schedule 2, the amendments to section 23(8) of the Aircraft and Shipbuilding Industries Act 1977 and section 3(3) of the British Aerospace Act 1980.
1987 c. 52	British Shipbuilders (Borrowing Powers) Act 1987	Section 1(2).
1988 c. 35	British Steel Act 1988	Section 1(2) and (5). Section 2. Section 3(1) to (4). Section 12. In Schedule 1, paragraph 4.
1993 c. 12	Radioactive Substances Act 1993	In Schedule 5, paragraph 8.
Group 2 – General Repeals
1964 c. 71	Trading Stamps Act 1964	In section 2(2)(a), the word "either" and the words from "or a business name" to "1916". Section 3(5) and (6). Section 9. Section 11(3).
1972 c. 45	Trading Representations (Disabled Persons) Amendment Act 1972	Section 1(4). Section 2. Section 3(2). In the Schedule, paragraph 1(2)(b).
1973 c. 41	Fair Trading Act 1973	In section 94(1), the words from "and the office" to the end. Section 140(3).
1974 c. 24	Prices Act 1974	Section 2. Section 5. In section 7, the words "for preventing abuse in connection with payments under section 1 above and", "2," and "and 5". Section 9(4). In the Schedule— in paragraph 5(1), the words "2," and "or 5", paragraphs 5(2), 11 and 12(2)(e), and in paragraph 14(2), the words from the beginning to "department and" where they first appear.
1975 c. 13	Unsolicited Goods and Services (Amendment) Act 1975	Section 2(1). Section 3(2). Section 4(2) to (4).
1975 c. 32	Prices Act 1975	The whole act.
1975 c. 70	Welsh Development Agency Act 1975	In section 27(1), in the definition of "accounting year", the words from ", except that" to the end. Section 29(2).
1976 c. 78	Industrial Common Ownership Act 1976	Section 1.
1980 c. 33	Industry Act 1980	Section 6(4). Section 8(2). Section 9. Sections 19 and 20. In section 22(3), the words from the beginning to "above," and from "(a)" to "other" except the word "any".
1981 c. 6	Industry Act 1981	Section 2(4). In section 3(2), paragraph (a) and the word "and" immediately before paragraph (c). Section 7(2). In section 7(5), the words "Subject to subsection (4) above,".
1981 c. 17	Energy Conservation Act 1981	The whole act.
1982 c. 52	Industrial Development Act 1982	Section 1(2). In section 1(4), the words "or, as the case may be, special development area". Section 1(5) and (6). In section 1(7), the words from ", and an order" to the end. Section 1(8). Part 2. Section 11(3). In section 15(2), the words "Part II,". Section 15(4). Section 16(4). In section 18(1), the words ", "special development area"" and ", as a special development area". Schedule 1. In Schedule 2, Part 1 and paragraphs 6 and 9 of Part 2.
1984 c. 57	Co-operative Development Agency and Industrial Development Act 1984	Section 3. Section 5(1) and (3) to (6). In section 6, the words from "but" to the end. Section 7. In section 8(2), the words "Part I of this Act and". In Schedule 1, Part 1 and paragraphs 1, 4, 5 and 6 of Part 2. In Schedule 2, the provisions at the end of Parts 1, 2 and 3.
1988 c. 11	Regional Development Grants (Termination) Act 1988	The whole act.
1991 c. 66	British Technology Group Act 1991	Section 1(2) and (5). Sections 2 to 7. In section 8(2), the words from "except to the extent" to the end. Section 8(3). Section 9. Section 13. In section 14(2), the words "6 above or". In Schedule 1, paragraph 1.
1991 c. 67	Export and Investment Guarantees Act 1991	Section 7(4). Section 15(6).
1994 c. 40	Deregulation and Contracting Out Act 1994	Section 14. Sections 23 and 24. Section 62(2). Section 64. Section 82(2) to (7). In Schedule 4, paragraphs 5 to 8. In Schedule 10, paragraphs 1(2), 2(1) and 3 to 5. In Schedule 11, paragraphs 4(2), 7(5)(b), 8, 9, 11 and 12(a).
1995 c. 40	Criminal Procedure (Consequential Provisions) (Scotland) Act 1995	In Schedule 4, paragraph 46.

==== Part 17 — Miscellaneous ====
Part 17 — Miscellaneous
Citation	Short title	Extent of repeal
Group 1 – Animals
56 & 57 Vict. c. 7	Customs and Inland Revenue Act 1893	The whole act.
6 Edw. 7 c. 32	Dogs Act 1906	Section 9.
12, 13 & 14 Geo. 6 c. 70	Docking and Nicking of Horses Act 1949	Section 2(5). Section 5(2).
8 & 9 Eliz. 2 c. 36	Game Laws (Amendment) Act 1960	In section 3(3), the words from "and in the said" to the end. Section 5. Section 6(4).
1968 c. 34	Agriculture (Miscellaneous Provisions) Act 1968	In section 6(4), the words from "and the provisions" to the end. Section 54(2).
1977 c. 31	Farriers (Registration) (Amendment) Act 1977	Section 1(2). Section 2(2) and (3).
1981 c. 22	Animal Health Act 1981	In section 77, the words from "Until the coming" to the end. Section 94(1). In Schedule 5, paragraph 4.
1981 c. 37	Zoo Licensing Act 1981	Section 1(4). Section 20. Section 22(1)(b). Section 23(2).
1984 c. 40	Animal Health and Welfare Act 1984	Section 4. Section 12. Section 17(2) and (3).
1987 c. 35	Protection of Animals (Penalties) Act 1987	Section 1(2). Section 2(2) and (3).
1988 c. 9	Local Government Act 1988	Section 38.
Group 2 – Banks and Building Societies
7 & 8 Vict. c. 32	Bank Charter Act 1844	Section 27.
55 & 56 Vict. c. 48	Bank Act 1892	Section 5.
9 & 10 Geo. 6 c. 27	Bank of England Act 1946	In Schedule 1, paragraph 4.
2 & 3 Eliz. 2 c. 12	Currency and Bank Notes Act 1954	Section 4(3).
1979 c. 37	Banking Act 1979	Section 51(2). Section 52(3).
1983 c. 9	Currency Act 1983	Section 2(8) and (9). Section 3(5).
1986 c. 53	Building Societies Act 1986	Section 119(5). In section 122(1), from the beginning to "21 and". Section 124. In section 126(3), the words "124," and "and Schedule 21". Section 126(4). In Schedule 18, paragraphs 3 and 19(2). Schedule 21.
Group 3 – Betting, Gaming and Lotteries
9 & 10 Vict. c. 48	Art Unions Act 1846	The whole act.
24 & 25 Geo. 5 c. 58	Betting and Lotteries Act 1934	The whole act.
1967 c. 54	Finance Act 1967	Section 45(2). Section 45(3)(f).
1968 c. 65	Gaming Act 1968	Section 44(2). In section 51(5), the words "(except any order under section 54 of this Act)". Section 54(3) to (5). In Schedule 3, in paragraph 13(3), the words "to (5)".
1976 c. 32	Lotteries and Amusements Act 1976	Section 25(6). In Schedule 4, paragraph 7.
1982 c. 22	Gaming (Amendment) Act 1982	In Schedule 1, paragraphs 2, 6(1) and (2) and 14.
1987 c. 11	Gaming (Amendment) Act 1987	Section 1(4). Section 2(2).
1992 c. 10	Bingo Act 1992	Section 1(9).
1993 c. 34	Finance Act 1993	Section 24(4)(e).
Group 4 – Charities
2 & 3 Eliz. 2 c. 58	Charitable Trusts (Validation) Act 1954	Section 4(1) to (3).
6 & 7 Eliz. 2 c. 17	Recreational Charities Act 1958	In section 3(3), the words from the beginning to "this section,". Section 3(4) and (5).
8 & 9 Eliz. 2 c. 58	Charities Act 1960	In section 28(9), the words "The Charities Procedure Act, 1812, and". Section 48(5). In Schedule 6, the entries relating to the Charitable Trustees Incorporation Act 1872, the Local Government Act 1933, the Administration of Justice Act 1956 and the Cathedrals Measure 1931.
1993 c. 10	Charities Act 1993	Section 99. Schedule 8.
Group 5 – Companies
8 & 9 Vict. c. 16	Companies Clauses Consolidation Act 1845	In section 33, the words "or master extraordinary".
1985 c. 6	Companies Act 1985	In sections 44(7)(b) and 103(7)(b), the words from "and any body" to the end. Section 718(4).
1985 c. 9	Companies Consolidation (Consequential Provisions) Act 1985	Section 21. Sections 27 and 28. In Schedule 2, the entries relating to— Agricultural Marketing Act 1958 Horticulture Act 1960 Professions Supplementary to Medicine Act 1960; Section 24(2) of the Transport Act 1962; Section 55(1) of the Betting, Gaming and Lotteries Act 1963; Hairdressers (Registration) Act 1964; Section 55 of the Industrial and Provident Societies Act 1965 Cereals Marketing Act 1965; Agriculture Act 1967; Hearing Aid Council Act 1968; Friendly and Industrial and Provident Societies Act 1968; Section 14(2) of the Transport Act 1968; Agriculture Act 1970; Investment and Building Grants Act 1971; Prevention of Oil Pollution Act 1971; Finance Act 1971; Finance Act 1972; Gas Act 1972; Industry Act 1972; Hallmarking Act 1973; Merchant Shipping Act 1974; Sections 36(1) and 87(2) of the Friendly Societies Act 1974; Farriers Registration Act 1975; Part 4 of Schedule 12 to the Finance (No.2) Act 1975; Petroleum and Submarine Pipe-lines Act 1975; Airports Authority Act 1975; Theatres Trust Act 1976; Section 3(3) of the Insolvency Act 1976 Section 17(8) of the Aircraft and Shipbuilding Industries Act 1977 Sections 88(3) and 114(2) of the Patents Act 1977; Commonwealth Development Corporation Act 1978; Co-operative Development Agency Act 1978; Estate Agents Act 1979; Section 9(1) of the British Aerospace Act 1980;Finance Act 1980; Schedule 31 to the Local Government, Planning and Land Act 1980; English Industrial Estates Corporation Act 1981; Licensing (Alcohol Education and Research) Act 1981; Finance Act 1981; British Telecommunications Act 1981; New Towns Act 1981; Trustee Savings Banks Act 1981; Agricultural Training Board Act 1982; Industrial Training Act 1982; Section 15(2)(a) of the Civil Aviation Act 1982; Oil and Gas (Enterprise) Act 1982; Section 37 of, and Schedule 4 to, the Iron and Steel Act 1982; Civil Jurisdiction and Judgments Act 1982; Finance Act 1982; Section 7 of the Transport Act 1982; Pilotage Act 1983 National Heritage Act 1983; Medical Act 1983; Section 68 of the Telecommunications Act 1984; County Courts Act 1984.
1989 c. 40	Companies Act 1989	Section 120(4). In section 127, subsections (2)(b) and (3). Section 137(2). In Schedule 4, paragraphs 4(3) and 7. In Schedule 5, paragraph 2(1). In Schedule 18, paragraphs 2, 11, 19 and 26. In Schedule 20, paragraphs 1, 2(2), 13(2) and 20.
Group 6 – Debt and Insolvency
32 & 33 Vict. c. 62	Debtors Act 1869	In section 5, the fifth paragraph of the second proviso.
41 & 42 Vict. c. 54	Debtors Act 1878	In section 1, the words "application for a writ of attachment, or other" and the word "writ," where it later appears.
1976 c. 60	Insolvency Act 1976	The whole act.
1984 c. 28	County Courts Act 1984	In Schedule 2, paragraphs 59 and 60.
1985 c. 65	Insolvency Act 1985	Section 219. Section 236(2). In Schedule 6, paragraph 8. In Schedule 8, paragraphs 10, 14, 17, 20, 32, 35, 37(2) and 38(4).
Group 7 – Medicine
1966 c. 36	Veterinary Surgeons Act 1966	Section 28(6) and (7). Section 29(3) and (4). In Schedule 1, paragraphs 12 and 13.
1968 c. 67	Medicines Act 1968	Section 25(1) to (3). Section 26. Section 37. In section 99(6), the proviso. Section 120. In section 135(2), the proviso. In Schedule 5, paragraph 1.
1971 c. 38	Misuse of Drugs Act 1971	In section 37(1), in the definition of "person lawfully conducting a retail pharmacy business", the words ", subject to subsection (5) below,". Section 37(5). Section 40(3).
1975 c. 4	Biological Standards Act 1975	Section 6. In section 8, in the definition of "accounting year", the words "or the period" to the end. Section 9(2).
1985 c. 39	Controlled Drugs (Penalties) Act 1985	Section 2.
Group 8 – Mental Health
7 & 8 Eliz. 2 c. 72	Mental Health Act 1959	In Schedule 7, the entries relating to the Children and Young Persons Act 1933, the Local Government Act 1958 and the Adoption Act 1958.
1982 c. 51	Mental Health (Amendment) Act 1982	In section 34(5), the words from the beginning to "1973,". In Schedule 3, paragraphs 33, 44, 47, 50 and 51.
1983 c. 20	Mental Health Act 1983	In section 48(2)(c), the words from "(including" to "attachment)". Section 149(3). In Schedule 3, the references to sections 133, 134 and 137 of the Inclosure Act 1845, the Tithe Act 1846 and the Merchant Shipping Act 1894. In Schedule 4, paragraphs 19, 30, 33, 36, 52, 53 and 54. In Schedule 5, paragraphs 4, 5, 7, 8, 9(1) and (3), 10 to 14, 18, 19, 22 and 26.
1986 c. 57	Public Trustee and Administration of Funds Act 1986	Section 4. Section 6(2).
1994 c. 6	Mental Health (Amendment) Act 1994	The whole act.
Group 9 – National Trust
7 Edw. 7 c. cxxxvi	National Trust Act 1907	Section 10. Sections 38 and 39. The whole act as it extends to the Isle of Man.
9 & 10 Geo. 5 c. lxxxiv	National Trust Charity Scheme Confirmation Act 1919	The whole act as it extends to the Isle of Man.
1 Edw. 8 & 1 Geo. 6 c. lvii	National Trust Act 1937	Section 6(1). Section 12(2). Section 13. Section 16. The whole act as it extends to the Isle of Man.
2 & 3 Geo. 6 c. lxxxvi	National Trust Act 1939	Section 16(1) and (3). Section 17. The whole act as it extends to the Isle of Man.
1 & 2 Eliz. 2 c. vii	National Trust Act 1953	Section 3(3). Section 5.
1971 c. vi	National Trust Act 1971	Section 7(1) and (2). Section 8(4). Section 12(7). Section 28. Section 32. Section 34.
Group 10 – Registration Concerning the Individual
3 & 4 Vict. c. 92	Non-Parochial Registers Act 1840	Section 1. Section 4.
19 & 20 Vict. c. 119	Marriage and Registration Act 1856	The whole act.
21 & 22 Vict. c. 25	Births and Deaths Registration Act 1858	The whole act.
1 & 2 Eliz. 2 c. 37	Registration Service Act 1953	Section 18. Section 22(1). In Schedule 1, paragraphs 1, 4, 5, 7, 8, 10 to 13, 14(b) to (d) and 15(b) to (d).
5 & 6 Eliz. 2 c. 58	Registration of Births, Deaths and Marriages (Special Provisions) Act 1957	Section 7(2) and (4).
8 & 9 Eliz. 2 c. 32	Population (Statistics) Act 1960	Section 1(1). Section 5(3).
1968 c. 14	Public Expenditure and Receipts Act 1968	In Schedule 3, the entry relating to section 18(3) and (4) of the Registration Service Act 1953 and the entry relating to section 24 of the Marriage and Registration Act 1856.
1972 c. 70	Local Government Act 1972	In Schedule 29, in paragraph 41(2), the words "18(2), (4) and (5)".
1992 c. 29	Still-Birth (Definition) Act 1992	Section 2(2).
Group 11 – General Repeals — (1) Agency
1971 c. 27	Powers of Attorney Act 1971	Section 8. Section 11(4).
Group 11 – General Repeals — (2) Auctions
17 & 18 Geo. 5 c. 12	Auctions (Bidding Agreements) Act 1927	Section 2.
1969 c. 56	Auctions (Bidding Agreements) Act 1969	Section 3(3) and (4). Section 5(2).
Group 11 – General Repeals — (3) Parks and Commons
16 & 17 Vict. c. 47	Battersea Park Act 1853	The whole act.
34 & 35 Vict. c. cciv	Wimbledon and Putney Commons Act 1871	Section 79.
Group 11 – General Repeals — (4) Carriers
11 Geo. 4 & 1 Will. 4 c. 68	Carriers Act 1830	In section 3, the words ", which receipt shall not be liable to any stamp duty". Section 11.
28 & 29 Vict. c. 94	Carriers Act Amendment Act 1865	The whole act.
Group 11 – General Repeals — (5) Isle of Man
17 & 18 Vict. c. 19	Naval Pay and Prize Act 1854	The whole act as it extends to the Isle of Man.
22 Vict. c. 25	Convict Prisons Abroad Act 1859	The whole act as it extends to the Isle of Man.
58 & 59 Vict. c. 33	Extradition Act 1895	The whole act as it extends to the Isle of Man.
5 & 6 Geo. 5 c. 54	Munitions of War Act 1915	The whole act as it extends to the Isle of Man.
7 & 8 Geo. 5 c. 19	Coroners (Emergency Provisions) Act 1917	The whole act as it extends to the Isle of Man.
8 & 9 Geo. 5 c. 7	Increase of Rent etc. (Amendment) Act 1918	The whole act as it extends to the Isle of Man.
9 & 10 Geo. 5 c. 7	Increase of Rent and Mortgage Interest (Restrictions) Act 1919	The whole act as it extends to the Isle of Man.
13 & 14 Geo. 5 c. 21	Forestry (Transfer of Woods) Act 1923	The whole act as it extends to the Isle of Man.
15 & 16 Geo. 5 c. 86	Criminal Justice Act 1925	The whole act as it extends to the Isle of Man.
19 & 20 Geo. 5 c. 27	Savings Banks Act 1929	The whole act as it extends to the Isle of Man.
1 Edw. 8 & 1 Geo. 6 c. 37	Children and Young Persons (Scotland) Act 1937	The whole act as it extends to the Isle of Man.
1969 c. 48	Post Office Act 1969	The whole act as it extends to the Isle of Man except sections 3, 94, 108, 109, 114, 132, 133, 138, 140 and 142, and Schedules 6 and 10.
1969 c. 61	Expiring Laws Act 1969	The whole act as it extends to the Isle of Man.
1981 c. 38	British Telecommunications Act 1981	The whole act as it extends to the Isle of Man.

== See also ==
- Statute Law (Repeals) Act
