= Transport Act 1983 =

Transportation legislation in the UK

- Act of Parliament
- Parliament of the United Kingdom
- Long title: An Act to make further provision with respect to the finances and management of certain Transport Executives; and to reduce the indebtedness of the National Dock Labour Board in respect of money borrowed from the Secretary of State for financing severance payments to registered dock workers.
- Citation: 1983 c. 10
- Territorial extent: England and Wales

Dates
- Royal assent: 28 March 1983

Other legislation
- Amended by: London Regional Transport Act 1984; Local Government Act 1985; Transport Act 1985; Transport Act 2000; Statute Law (Repeals) Act 2004; Local Transport Act 2008

Status: Amended

Text of statute as originally enacted

Text of the Transport Act 1983 as in force today (including any amendments) within the United Kingdom, from legislation.gov.uk.

The Transport Act 1983 (c. 10) is an act of the Parliament of the United Kingdom.

== Provisions ==
The act implemented recommendations contained in the white paper Public Transport Subsidies in Cities (Cmnd 8735, November 1982).

The act limited the amount of subsidy the passenger transport executives could provide to their bus operations.

The act provided for the possibility for local authorities to put their bus services out to tender.

== Reception ==
The act was criticised by the trade unions representing the bus services industry.
