= Civil Service (Management Functions) Act 1992 =

Act of the Parliament of the United Kingdom

Civil Service (Management Functions) Act 1992 (Note: Section 4(1).)
- Act of Parliament
- Parliament of the United Kingdom
- Long title: An Act to make provision with respect to functions relating to the management of Her Majesty's Home Civil Service; and to make provision about parliamentary procedure in relation to legislation for Northern Ireland making corresponding provision with respect to the Northern Ireland Civil Service.
- Citation: 1992 c. 61
- Territorial extent: United Kingdom (Note: Section 4(3).)

Dates
- Royal assent: 17 December 1992
- Commencement: 17 December 1992 (Note: Section 4(b) of the Interpretation Act 1978.)
Other legislation
| Amended by | Constitutional Reform and Governance Act 2010 |

Status: Amended

History of passage through Parliament

Text of statute as originally enacted

Text of the Civil Service (Management Functions) Act 1992 as in force today (including any amendments) within the United Kingdom, from legislation.gov.uk.

The Civil Service (Management Functions) Act 1992 (c. 61) is an act of the Parliament of the United Kingdom.

== Provisions ==
The act allows government ministers to delegate powers vested in them to "any other servant of the Crown" - in practice, this has generally meant civil servants. The act allowed for the delegation of management functions to executive agencies.

The act allowed individual departments to determine their own pay arrangements and broke up national pay bargaining.

The act extends to civil servants working for the Scottish Government and the Welsh Government. The act also extends to the Diplomatic Service.
