= CITB =

UK construction industry training organisation

The CITB logo

The Construction Industry Training Board (CITB), a quasi-autonomous near-government organisation (quango), is one of two construction industry training board for the UK construction industry. (Note: The other Industry Training Board is Engineering Construction Industry Training Board (ECITB).)

== History ==
Industrial Training Act 1964 (Note: Section 19(1).)
- Act of Parliament
- Parliament of the United Kingdom
- Long title: An Act to make further provision for industrial and commercial training; to raise the limit on contributions out of the National Insurance Fund towards the expenses of the Minister of Labour in providing training courses; and for purposes connected with those matters.
- Citation: 1964 c. 16
- Territorial extent: England and Wales; Scotland; Northern Ireland (section 18); (Note: Section 19(2).)

Dates
- Royal assent: 12 March 1964
- Commencement: 12 March 1964 (Note: The Acts of Parliament (Commencement) Act 1793.)

Other legislation
- Amended by: House of Commons Disqualification Act 1975; Education (Scotland) Act 1980; Agricultural Training Board Act 1982; Industrial Training Act 1982; Statute Law (Repeals) Act 1998

Status: Partially repealed

Text of statute as originally enacted

Revised text of statute as amended

Text of the Industrial Training Act 1964 as in force today (including any amendments) within the United Kingdom, from legislation.gov.uk.

Industrial Training (Construction Board) Order 1964 (Note: Section 1(1).)
- Statutory Instrument
- Parliament of the United Kingdom
- Citation: SI 1964/1079
- Territorial extent: United Kingdom

Dates
- Made: 13 July 1964
- Laid before Parliament: 20 July 1964
- Commencement: 21 July 1964

Other legislation
- Made under: Industrial Training Act 1964

Status: Current legislation

Text of statute as originally enacted

Text of the Industrial Training (Construction Board) Order 1964 as in force today (including any amendments) within the United Kingdom, from legislation.gov.uk.

The CITB was established on 21 July 1964 by the Industrial Training (Construction Board) Order 1964 (SI 1964/1079), and was one of a number of training boards covering UK industries. It was a non-departmental public body of the Department for Business, Innovation and Skills until 2016 when it moved to the Department for Education and then to the Department for Work and Pensions in 2025. The activities of the CITB have been redefined by statutory instruments (including the Industrial Training (Construction Board) Order 1964 (Amendment) Order 1991 (SI 1991/28) and the Industrial Training (Construction Board) Order 1964 (Amendment) Order 1992 (SI 1992/3048)).

In October 2003 Charles Clarke, then Secretary of State for Education and Skills, awarded the licence for the new construction industry sector skills council (SSC) to "ConstructionSkills", a partnership between the CITB and the Construction Industry Council (CIC). The CITB became known as CITB-ConstructionSkills, or simply ConstructionSkills, for most of the next 10 years.

In March 2013, it was announced that the organisation would drop brands such as CITB-ConstructionSkills, CSkills Awards and the National Construction College (the NCC operated from seven locations: Ashbourne, Erith, Inchinnan, Bircham Newton near King's Lynn, King's Norton, Leytonstone and Llangefni), and revert to its original CITB name as a result of industry feedback suggesting that multiple brands were causing confusion.

=== 2016 review ===
The October 2016 Farmer Review of the UK Construction Labour Model made several key recommendations to reform training in the industry. One of these was for fundamental reform of the CITB and the levy. In May 2017, the awarding body Cskills Awards was sold to another industry awarding body NOCN.

In October 2016, the government's skills minister Robert Halfon appointed Paul Morrell to lead a review of industrial training boards, in particular the future role of the CITB. Industry support for the CITB varied widely, with some sectors (notably housebuilding) voting against renewal of the CITB's levy, while others (Build UK, for example) favoured its continuation so long as there were reforms. The report, Building Support: the review of the Industry Training Boards, was published in November 2017.

=== Restructuring ===
In November 2017, the CITB unveiled a new strategy to become simpler and more streamlined, ending direct training via the National Construction College, and abandoning its facility at Bircham Newton in Norfolk moving to Peterborough, where it is now based. The changes were likely to include substantial job losses among the CITB's 1,400 staff, particularly in Norfolk, as it commissioned outside providers rather than providing training itself. In total, 750 staff, more than half the workforce, were said to be under threat of redundancy.

In April 2018, the CITB unveiled a three-year plan in which more than 800 staff would be axed in reforms designed to modernise its business. The CITB proposed to reduce from 1,370 UK staff in March 2018 to 358 by 2021. In November 2018, various back-office functions were outsourced, affecting 337 staff, with most transferring to the new provider, Shared Services Connected Ltd (SSCL). In December 2018, it was revealed that, to retain employment with SSCL, over 200 staff based in Norfolk, plus over 100 staff in London, Leicestershire, Scotland and Wales, would be forced to relocate and work from SSCL's offices in York and other locations - a move condemned by Unite the Union as effectively making the 300 staff redundant. In March 2019, the CITB's new head office was established in Peterborough.

In February 2020, the CITB announced it had sold the NCC's Bircham Newton site to West Suffolk College, based in Bury St Edmunds, aiming to continue construction industry training provision at the site. However, the sale later fell through and in March 2021 CITB said it had decided to retain its Bircham Newtwon site, plus its Scottish facility at Inchinnan. Industry publication The Construction Index said that retaining Bircham Newton and Inchinnan was "not just a temporary suspension of the sale process but an absolute volte face of policy and a return to its core purpose of providing training".

In November 2020, the CITB's training facility in King's Norton was sold to Walsall College. Sale discussions with a training provider for CITB's Erith facility were continuing in March 2021.

In August 2020, it was reported that CITB staff were facing salary cuts and possible redundancies as the organisation managed a £160m decline in its income. CITB opened consultations with staff to make up to 110 redundancies, saving £4.5m annually, with levy income predicted to fall due to the impact of the COVID-19 pandemic.

In November 2022, the CITB made a £5.9m provision in its accounts after over-claiming for government apprenticeship funding.

=== 2023 review ===
In July 2023, the Department for Education launched a review of the CITB and Engineering Construction Industry Training Board (ECITB), to be led by Mark Farmer. The review was set to be published by the end of summer 2024, but was later delayed until early 2025, with a knock-on impact on the CITB's training levy review procedure (a process known as Consensus).

In July 2024, the new Labour Government announced proposals to overhaul skills provision in England by the formation of Skills England, but it was unclear how the CITB would fit into the new regime. A survey for Hudson Contract revealed 74% of construction business leaders wanted.to scrap the CITB and its levy; Hudson MD Ian Anfield called for it be merged into the new Skills England (Hudson, also known as Knot Builders, was engaged in what an appeal judge later described as an "opportunistic" and "cynical" legal challenge regarding CITB grant payments).

The Farmer-led review, published on 30 January 2025, said the CITB needed a "fundamental reset" and should merge with the ECITB. While there could be significant benefits from greater alignment and collaboration between the two ITBs, the Government was not planning to legislate to create a single body. In March 2026, the government announced an industry consultation on merging the two boards to form a single training body.

In December 2025, the CITB announced a cut in training grants and funding for popular courses. The move prompted one member of the organisation's funding committee to resign in protest, and led to calls for the CITB to be scrapped. In 2024, CITB raised £228.1m from its industry levy and £52m from other sources; it spent £129.8m on training grants and £53.4m on skills funding.

In May 2026, a CITB survey revealed as part of its 2026/27 Business Plan showed just one in three construction employers were satisfied with the CITB.

== Criticism ==
With construction employers paying a statutory levy to the CITB, it has been subject to industry criticism over its funding of training. In June 2016, for example, the CITB was criticised for not supporting an industry charity, Building Lives, while providing grants to organisations to train sales and marketing staff.

Despite the CITB's review and restructuring, criticisms of the body continued. In October 2021, the National Federation of Builders called for a fundamental CITB restructure to ensure greater efficiency, accountability, and a more focused and successful delivery of skills and training outcomes. In January 2022, the House of Lords Built Environment Committee published a report, Meeting housing demand, which was critical of the CITB's training provision to small housebuilders amid an ongoing skills shortage. It said:

"The Construction Industry Training Board has not addressed construction skills shortages in an effective manner over many years. Reform is needed to address this issue. The government should consider how the Construction Industry Training Board can upgrade its training offer for construction professionals. Failure to recruit and train the skills required to build new homes should cause the government to consider potential alternative models for a national construction careers body."

In May 2023, CITB was given a "requires improvement" rating following an Ofsted inspection, which criticised CITB's quality of education, leadership and management, and apprenticeships.
