= School Teachers' Pay and Conditions Document =

The School Teachers' Pay and Conditions Document (STPCD) is an annually-published document which forms a part of the contract of all teachers and head teachers in maintained schools in England and Wales. The document is binding on all maintained schools and local education authorities.

== Content ==
The current version of the STPCD is formed of four sections, although the document itself is actually included in section 2. The document is accompanied by an explanatory introduction and statutory guidance.

=== Section One ===
The introduction of the document sets out its legal status, and gives summary details of key changes to the document in its most recent version.

=== Section Two ===
Section two is the main legal document, which sets out the key pay and conditions arrangements for teachers. Although sections vary, recent documents have been formed of 12 parts, outlines of which are listed:

==== Part One ====
This sets out the commencement arrangements for the document, and gives a detailed glossary of definitions for terms used within the document.

==== Part Two ====
This sets out the context of the document, including the need for teachers' pay to be reviewed annually, and setting requirements on schools to have a pay policy.

==== Parts Three to Seven ====
These parts set out the arrangements for the pay of head teachers, deputy head teachers, assistant head teacher, qualified teachers and unqualified teachers, including arrangements for performance related pay, teaching and learning responsibility awards and other supplementary pay awards

==== Parts Eight to Twelve ====
These parts relate to the conditions under which teachers and school leaders are employed, including setting out the number of days to be worked, and the number of hours which teachers may be directed to work. Notably, it also includes a clause which requires a teacher to "work such reasonable additional hours as may be needed to enable him to discharm m ge effectively his professional duties"

These parts also detail the arrangements for planning, preparation and assessment time - that is, the allocation of time which must be set aside for teachers' planning and assessment during the school day, and during which time they cannot be required to teach pupils.

=== Section Three ===
This section gives general guidance for employers and employees on the application of the document.

=== Section Four ===
This section gives guidance on recent changes to teachers' pay and conditions since the introduction of the National Workload Agreement between the government and unions. This agreement saw the removal of administrative work from teachers' responsibilities, and introduced compulsory non-contact time for all teachers.

== New documents ==
The content of each new document is formed following proposals from the School Teachers' Review Body. The body makes recommendations to the secretary of state, having received evidence from various bodies, including the secretary of state, teaching unions, and the Department for Children, Schools and Families.

== Enactment ==
Each year, the document is constructed by the Department for Children, Schools and Families outlining the pay and conditions of teachers in schools. It must then be enacted by secondary legislation, and this too is produced annually in the name of Secretary of State for Education and Skills. The Statutory Instrument is currently issued under the provisions of the Education Act 2002.

The secondary legislation usually takes the form of a statutory instrument entitled "The Education (School Teachers' Pay and Conditions) Order". This document revokes the previous year's document, replacing it with the new version. The legislation is normally brought in during August of each year, coming into effect on 1 September before new school terms start.
