= School Inspections Act 1996 =

Act of the Parliament of the United Kingdom

School Inspections Act 1996 (Note: Section 48(1).)
- Act of Parliament
- Parliament of the United Kingdom
- Long title: An Act to consolidate provisions of the Education (Schools) Act 1992 and Part V of the Education Act 1993, with amendments to give effect to recommendations of the Law Commission.
- Citation: 1996 c. 57
- Territorial extent: England and Wales (Note: Section 48(3).)

Dates
- Royal assent: 24 July 1996
- Commencement: 1 November 1996 (Note: Section 48(2).)
- Repealed: 1 September 2005 (England) (Note: The Education Act 2005 (Commencement No.1 and Savings and Transitional Provisions) Order 2005 (SI 2005/2034).)
Other legislation
Amends	See § Repealed enactments
Repeals/revokes	See § Repealed enactments
Repealed by	Education Act 2005
Relates to	Education Act 1996

Status: Repealed

Text of statute as originally enacted

Revised text of statute as amended

The School Inspections Act 1996 (c. 57) was an act of the Parliament of the United Kingdom that consolidated enactments relating to the inspection of schools in England and Wales.

== Provisions ==
=== Repealed enactments ===
Section 47(2) of the act repealed 3 enactments, listed in schedule 7 to the act.

Citation	Short title	Extent of repeal
1992 c. 38	Education (Schools) Act 1992	The whole Act except sections 16, 17 and 21(5) and paragraphs 1 and 4 to 6 of Schedule 4.
1993 c. 8	Judicial Pensions and Retirement Act 1993	In Schedule 6, paragraph 67.
1993 c. 35	Education Act 1993	Part V.
1993 c. 35	Education Act 1993	Section 259.
1993 c. 35	Education Act 1993	Section 299 so far as relating to section 225 or 226 of the Act.
1993 c. 35	Education Act 1993	In section 306, the entries "appropriate appointing authority (in Part V)", "appropriate authority (in Part V)", "inspection by a member of the Inspectorate (in Part V)", "member of the Inspectorate (in Part V)", "section 9 inspection (in Part V)", "special measures (in Part V)" and "transfer date (in Part V)".
1993 c. 35	Education Act 1993	Schedule 12.
1993 c. 35	Education Act 1993	In Schedule 19, paragraph 173.

== Subsequent developments ==
The whole act was repealed by section 123 of, and schedule 19 to, the Education Act 2005, which came into force on 1 September 2005 in relation to England. (Note: The Education Act 2005 (Commencement No.1 and Savings and Transitional Provisions) Order 2005 (SI 2005/2034).)
