= Healthy Eating in Schools (Wales) Measure 2009 =

Measure of the National Assembly for Wales

Healthy Eating in Schools (Wales) Measure 2009 (Note: Section 12(1).)
- Measure of the National Assembly for Wales
- National Assembly for Wales
- Long title: A Measure of the National Assembly for Wales to make provision about the promotion of healthy eating and drinking by pupils in maintained schools in Wales; to provide for the regulation of food and drink provided to pupils in maintained schools by the governing bodies of those schools or local authorities; and for connected purposes.
- Citation: 2009 nawm 1
- Introduced by: Jenny Randerson AM

Dates
- Royal approval: 15 October 2009
- Commencement: 15 October 2009 (section 12); 7 August 2013 (rest of act); (Note: Section 12(2)–(3). The Healthy Eating in Schools (Wales) Measure 2009 (Commencement) Order 2013 (SI 2013/1985).)

Other legislation
- Amends: Education Act 1996

Status: Amended

History of passage through the Assembly

Text of statute as originally enacted

Revised text of statute as amended

Text of the Healthy Eating in Schools (Wales) Measure 2009 as in force today (including any amendments) within the United Kingdom, from legislation.gov.uk.

The Healthy Eating in Schools (Wales) Measure 2009 (nawm 3) (Welsh: Mesur Bwyta'n Iach mewn Ysgolion (Cymru) 2009 (mccc 3)) is a measure of the National Assembly for Wales seeking to promote healthy eating in schools maintained by the Welsh Government.

== Background ==
In July 2005, Welsh Assembly Government (WAG) established the Food in Schools Working Group. This consisted of 23 members representing all key stakeholders in the provision of school meals. The group considered the strategic context within which they were working and identified several WAG publications which laid foundations for school based food standards.

In 2006, the Welsh Assembly Government launched a consultation document entitled "Appetite for Life", which comprised 41 proposals, of which three are particularly pertinent to this piece of work. Proposal 15 highlights the importance of catering staff as being central to the process of improving school meals and suggested they should be key members of School Nutrition Action Groups (SNAGs). Proposal 19 discusses the role of a whole school approach to food and drinks provision and encourages the development of key health messages as part of the whole school curriculum. Whilst Proposal 20 once again emphasises the importance of a whole school approach and highlights the role of School Governors in taking forward the initiatives outlined within Appetite for Life.

In order to facilitate the consultation process and gather opinions from all stakeholders, a Children and Young People's version of Appetite for Life consultation document was issued in September 2006. The consultation period for this document ran from June 2006 to 31 October 2006. The final draft of the Appetite For life document was launched in November 2007 in Cardiff as an action plan. The plan set out the strategic direction and actions required to improve the nutritional standards of food and drink provided in schools in Wales. It was announced at this launch that the implementation of Appetite for Life guidelines as legislation was to be delayed until 2008 for primary schools and 2009 for secondary schools, partly as a result of the difficulties experienced by England and feedback from the Local Authority Caterers Association.

== Provisions ==
The school meal system is underpinned by the measure which sets out the roles and duties for ensuring the requirements of regulations and guidance under the Measure are met. As part of its inspections, Estyn considers food systems.

The measure required local authorities and governing bodies to promote healthy eating and drinking by pupils in maintained schools in Wales and to provide for the regulation of food and drink provided in those schools.

Regulations made under the measure impose requirements and standards about all food and drink served to pupils at breakfast, break times, lunchtimes, afternoon break and after-school-clubs across the whole school day in all maintained schools. This applies whether such food/drink is provided by the local authority, in-house by the school or by a contract caterer. The regulations also apply to food and drink served at any outlet on school premises throughout the school day, including the school tuck shop, vending machines, outside serving areas, canteens, and sixth form cafés.

== Further developments ==
The Welsh Loocal Government Association hosts a national Food in Schools Coordinator in partnership with the Welsh Government, in order to support local authorities in complying with the Measure.

In 2021, the Farming Union criticised Anglesey County Council's decision to implement a meatless Monday referring to guidance issued under the measure. In 2024, a Senedd petition called for all pupils across Wales to have meatless Mondays, which would not contradict the regulations under the measure.
