= Education (No. 2) Act 1986 =

Act of the Parliament of the United Kingdom

Education (No. 2) Act 1986 (Note: Section 67(1).)
- Act of Parliament
- Parliament of the United Kingdom
- Long title: An Act to amend the law relating to education.
- Citation: 1986 c. 61
- Introduced by: Kenneth Baker, Secretary of State for Education and Science (Commons); David Cunliffe-Lister, 2nd Earl of Swinton (Lords)
- Territorial extent: England and Wales; Scotland (in part); Northern Ireland (in part); (Note: Section 67(7).)

Dates
- Royal assent: 7 November 1986
- Commencement: various (Note: Section 66.)

Other legislation
- Amends: Education (Scotland) Act 1980
- Amended by: Education Reform Act 1988; Statute Law (Repeals) Act 1989; Further and Higher Education Act 1992; Education Act 1996; Education Act 2002; Higher Education and Research Act 2017; Higher Education (Freedom of Speech) Act 2023

Status: Amended

Text of statute as originally enacted

Revised text of statute as amended

Text of the Education (No. 2) Act 1986 as in force today (including any amendments) within the United Kingdom, from legislation.gov.uk.

The Education (No. 2) Act 1986 (c. 61) is an act of the Parliament of the United Kingdom that made various legal changes to education in the UK. Though introduced to the House of Commons by his immediate successor Kenneth Baker, the act was prepared by Margaret Thatcher's second Education Secretary, Keith Joseph, an ideological opponent of "statism" who sought to empower parents against local bureaucrats.

To this end, the act redefined the respective roles of the government, parents, local education authorities (LEAs), and head teachers in school governance, giving parents equal representation with LEAs on school governing bodies and establishing for the first time a duty to hold parents' meetings. It also prohibited corporal punishment in state schools and independent schools receiving public funding, paving the way for its complete abolition in 1998, and forbade "political indoctrination" by teachers in schools.

Section 43 of the act, which remains in force, imposes a duty on universities to protect freedom of speech, and in particular to ensure that "the use of any premises of the establishment is not denied to any individual or body of persons" on account of their beliefs. This measure was originally introduced in response to disruptive student protests and the rise of "no platform" policies among student activists in the mid-1980s, and was included in the act after pressure by the House of Lords following an earlier private member's bill to protect freedom of speech in universities sponsored by Conservative backbencher Fred Silvester. In 2021, the Conservative government of Boris Johnson brought forward a Higher Education (Freedom of Speech) Bill that would extend this duty to students' unions.

The Education (No. 2) Act was introduced to Parliament as the Education Bill, but a subsequent Education (No. 2) Bill was enacted first and became the Education Act 1986, resulting in the other bill's retitling when it became a statute.
