= Higher Education (Freedom of Speech) Act 2023 =

Act of the Parliament of the United Kingdom

Higher Education (Freedom of Speech) Act 2023 (Note: Section 14.)
- Act of Parliament
- Parliament of the United Kingdom
- Long title: An Act to make provision in relation to freedom of speech and academic freedom in higher education institutions and in students’ unions; and for connected purposes.
- Citation: 2023 c. 16
- Introduced by: Gavin Williamson, Secretary of State for Education (Commons); Frederick Curzon, Deputy Leader of the House of Lords (Lords)
- Territorial extent: England and Wales; Scotland; (Note: Section 12.)

Dates
- Royal assent: 11 May 2023
- Commencement: Various (Note: Section 13.)
Other legislation
Amends	Education (No. 2) Act 1986; Higher Education Act 2004; Counter-Terrorism and Security Act 2015; Higher Education and Research Act 2017
Relates to	Education (No. 2) Act 1986; Counter-Terrorism and Security Act 2015; Higher Education and Research Act 2017

Status: Current legislation

History of passage through Parliament

Text of statute as originally enacted

Revised text of statute as amended

The Higher Education (Freedom of Speech) Act 2023 (c. 16) is an act of the Parliament of the United Kingdom that imposes requirements for universities and students' unions to protect freedom of speech. The legislation allows speakers to seek compensation for no-platforming through a new statutory tort, empowers the Office for Students to levy fines on infringing institutions, and establishes a new ombudsman or "free speech champion" charged with monitoring cases of no-platforming and academic dismissals. These measures are intended to protect academic staff, students, and visitors who advocate controversial viewpoints.

After much parliamentary debate, the bill received royal assent on 11 May 2023 and entered into force.

== Background ==
"No platform" policies aiming to deny certain public figures the opportunity to speak have existed among British students' unions since the 1970s, with the National Union of Students adopting its version in April 1974. These policies formalised an approach developed by the anti-fascist student left in the late 1960s. In the 1990s and 2000s, no-platforming efforts focused on the far-right British National Party as well as Islamist groups, particularly Hizb ut-Tahrir. In the 2010s, however, activist attention came to focus more on public figures viewed as transphobic, and some journalists and politicians argued that no platform policies were being extended well beyond the far right.

=== 2020–21 incidents ===
After student societies at Oxford University deplatformed the history professor Selina Todd and a former home secretary, Amber Rudd, in February and March 2020, the Secretary of State for Education, Gavin Williamson, warned that the government would move to "defend free speech" if universities failed to do so themselves. HuffPost UK reported soon afterwards that the government was preparing a law to protect freedom of speech in higher education, fulfilling the Conservative Party's manifesto pledge in the 2019 general election to "strengthen academic freedom and free speech in universities". A Department for Education spokesperson stated at the time that the government had "made clear that if universities do not uphold free speech, the government will".

In March 2021, David Miller, a professor at the University of Bristol, was put under investigation after making controversial remarks on Zionism, another incident that raised concerns over academic freedom. Lord Parkinson, on behalf of the government, stated in response that universities are "independent and autonomous organisations" with the responsibility to determine the limits of "lawful free speech" for themselves, though the government condemned Miller's comments.

The government confirmed in February 2021 that legislation would soon be brought forward to protect freedom of speech and academic freedom in universities, and published a policy paper outlining its intended approach. Titled the Higher Education (Freedom of Speech) Bill, the proposed law was formally announced by Queen Elizabeth II in her speech from the throne at the 2021 State Opening of Parliament on 11 May 2021.

== Provisions ==
The bill would create a statutory tort enabling individuals to sue for compensation for losses suffered from an academic institution's failure to protect freedom of speech. For the first time, it would extend universities' obligation to protect freedom of speech, established in section 43 of the Education (No. 2) Act 1986, to students' unions. In addition, it would institute an office of Director for Freedom of Speech and Academic Freedom, informally the "free speech champion", as an ombudsman to sit on the board of the Education Department's Office for Students (OfS) and monitor potential infringements such as deplatforming incidents and politically motivated academic dismissals. The bill would also establish a duty for the OfS to promote freedom of speech, and empower it to fine infringing institutions.

== Legislative history ==
The bill was introduced in the House of Commons by the Education Secretary Gavin Williamson and given its first reading on 12 May 2021. Its second reading took place two months later on 12 July. After being carried over into the 2022–23 parliamentary session, it received a third reading on 13 June 2022 and was introduced in the House of Lords by the Earl Howe the following day.

Members of the House of Lords raised several issues with the bill’s principles and its provisions. These included the Government’s priorities for improving higher education, the likely administrative and financial burden on universities, contradictions with other proposed legislation and Department for Education policy, and the appointment process of the Free Speech Director. The bill passed its third reading in the Lords on 7 December 2022 with 12 amendments agreed, while Clause 4 of the bill was removed.

On 7 February 2023, the House of Commons agreed with 11 of the 12 amendments without a vote, but also approved in a 283-161 vote a motion of the government to reinstate clause 4.

On 21 March 2023, the House of Lords agreed to restore clause 4 to the bill without a vote, but it amended the clause's wording so a civil claim could only be brought by an individual if: 1) they had suffered a loss due to a breach of the freedom of speech and academic freedom duties; and 2) they had first exhausted an existing complaints scheme.

On 2 May 2023, the House of Commons agreed a government motion accepting the Lords amendments that a civil claim could only be brought by an individual if they had suffered a loss due to a breach of freedom of speech duties. However, the motion also proposed an alternative to one of the Lords amendments that defined 'loss' to mean loss of any kind, including reputational damage. The motion also proposed that if a claimant was just seeking an injunction, the provision that legal proceedings could only be brought after an existing complaints scheme had been exhausted would not apply.

On 10 May 2023, the House of Lords considered the Commons amendment to clause 4 to define 'loss' as both pecuniary and non-pecuniary, and to allow an individual to seek a court injunction without first exhausting a complaints scheme. The government tabled a motion agreeing with the Commons amendment. It was agreed without a vote.

The bill received royal assent by King Charles III on 11 May 2023 and became the Higher Education (Freedom of Speech) Act.

== Reception ==
=== Political reception ===
In the debate following its announcement in the 2021 Queen's Speech, the Labour Party's Shadow Education Secretary, Kate Green, questioned whether the bill would protect Holocaust deniers, and the Conservative former minister Edward Leigh suggested that it could have "unintended consequences", arguing that free speech "should be governed by good manners" rather than laws. The Prime Minister's Office subsequently rebuked Michelle Donelan, the universities minister, for failing to deny categorically that the bill would force universities to host Holocaust deniers.

=== Media and advocacy groups ===
A joint letter from the freedom of expression campaign groups Index on Censorship, English PEN, and Article 19 on 11 May 2021 criticised the bill, arguing that the threat of fines was likely to diminish, rather than enhance, freedom of speech at universities, and would create "a chilling effect" on the content of academic teaching and the scope of research.

Writing in The Daily Telegraph, however, the Birkbeck politics professor and Policy Exchange fellow Eric Kaufmann welcomed the bill as recognising that the "university's highest value is the search for truth, not the subjectively-defined emotional safety of students", and noted that it drew on previous recommendations by Policy Exchange.

=== Higher education sector ===
Jo Grady, general secretary of the University and College Union, a trade union for higher education staff, described the bill as itself "a serious threat to freedom of speech and academic freedom" and argued that the government had "over-exaggerated" the issues motivating the bill. Spokespeople for the Russell Group of universities and Universities UK stated that the bill should be "proportionate" and avoid creating unnecessary bureaucracy, infringing university autonomy, or duplicating existing laws, though the Russell Group shared the government's goal of protecting free expression.

The bill met a mixed reception among academics. Jonathan Grant, a public policy professor at King's College London who authored a 2019 study cited by the government in preparing the legislation, termed the bill "excessive and over the top", and criticised the government for conflating the chilling effect of censorship with "cancel culture". However, the Cambridge philosophy lecturer Arif Ahmed, who led a successful campaign in 2020 to overturn a proposed free speech code at the university demanding respect for others' identities, called the bill "extremely welcome", though he added that "a top-down approach is never going to be a complete solution".

=== Legal experts ===
Julian Sladdin, a higher education expert at the law firm Pinsent Masons, noted that persons seeking to make claims under the bill would still need to demonstrate that any breach of duty had caused them legally significant loss, and expressed scepticism that this would "easily translate into successful litigation in most cases".
