= Education (Scotland) Act 1980 =

Act of the Parliament of the United Kingdom

Education (Scotland) Act 1980 (Note: Section 137(1).)
- Act of Parliament
- Parliament of the United Kingdom
- Long title: An Act to consolidate certain enactments relating to education in Scotland with amendments to give effect to recommendations of the Scottish Law Commission.
- Citation: 1980 c. 44
- Territorial extent: Scotland (Note: Section 137(5).)

Dates
- Royal assent: 1 August 1980
- Commencement: 1 September 1980 (Note: Section 137(2).)

Other legislation
- Amends: See § Repealed enactments
- Repeals/revokes: See § Repealed enactments
- Amended by: Local Government (Miscellaneous Provisions) (Scotland) Act 1981; Education (Scotland) Act 1981; Local Government and Planning (Scotland) Act 1982; Mental Health (Scotland) Act 1984; Foster Children (Scotland) Act 1984; Disabled Persons (Services, Consultation and Representation) Act 1986; Education (No. 2) Act 1986; Debtors (Scotland) Act 1987; Self-Governing Schools etc. (Scotland) Act 1989; Further and Higher Education (Scotland) Act 1992; Education (Schools) Act 1992; Tribunals and Inquiries Act 1992; Trade Union Reform and Employment Rights Act 1993; Local Government etc. (Scotland) Act 1994; Children (Scotland) Act 1995; Education (Scotland) Act 1996; Education Act 1996; Teaching and Higher Education Act 1998; National Minimum Wage Act 1998; Race Relations (Amendment) Act 2000; Abolition of Feudal Tenure etc. (Scotland) Act 2000; Standards in Scotland’s Schools etc. Act 2000; School Education (Amendment) (Scotland) Act 2002; Mental Health (Care and Treatment) (Scotland) Act 2003; Education (Additional Support for Learning) (Scotland) Act 2004; School Education (Ministerial Powers and Independent Schools) (Scotland) Act 2004; Further and Higher Education (Scotland) Act 2005; Scottish Schools (Parental Involvement) Act 2006; Electronic Communications (Scotland) Order 2006; Protection of Vulnerable Groups (Scotland) Act 2007; Criminal Proceedings etc. (Reform) (Scotland) Act 2007; Schools (Health Promotion and Nutrition) (Scotland) Act 2007; Schools (Consultation) (Scotland) Act 2010; Local Education Authorities and Children’s Services Authorities (Integration of Functions) Order 2010; Children’s Hearings (Scotland) Act 2011 (Modification of Primary Legislation) Order 2013; Children and Young People (Scotland) Act 2014; Education (Scotland) Act 2016; Disclosure (Scotland) Act 2020; Scottish Languages Act 2025; Education (Scotland) Act 2025
- Relates to: Education Act 1980

Status: Amended

Text of statute as originally enacted

Revised text of statute as amended

Text of the Education (Scotland) Act 1980 as in force today (including any amendments) within the United Kingdom, from legislation.gov.uk.

The Education (Scotland) Act 1980 (c. 44) is an act of the Parliament of the United Kingdom that consolidated certain enactments relating to education in Scotland, with amendments to give effect to recommendations of the Scottish Law Commission.

== Provisions ==
=== Repealed enactments ===
Section 136(3) of the act repealed 22 enactments, listed in schedule 5 to the act.

Citation	Short title	Extent of repeal
10 & 11 Eliz. 2. c. 47	Education (Scotland) Act 1962	The whole act except sections 136 and 137, subsections (7), (16), (18), (19), (33) and (42) of section 145, section 149(1) and (2) and section 148(2) and Schedule 9 so far as they relate to section 136.
1963 c. 21	Education (Scotland) Act 1963	The whole act.
1964 c. 16	Industrial Training Act 1964	Section 16.
1964 c. 82	Education Act 1964	Section 5.
1967 c. 36	Remuneration of Teachers (Scotland) Act 1967	The whole act.
1967 c. 80	Criminal Justice Act 1967	Part I of Schedule 3 so far as relating to amendments of the Education (Scotland) Act 1962.
1968 c. 49	Social Work (Scotland) Act 1968	Schedule 8 so far as relating to the Education (Scotland) Act 1962.
1969 c. 49	Education (Scotland) Act 1969	The whole act.
1970 c. 44	Chronically Sick and Disabled Persons Act 1970	Sections 25 to 27.
1971 c. 42	Education (Scotland) Act 1971	The whole act.
1972 c. 11	Superannuation Act 1972	In Schedule 6, paragraph 42.
1973 c. 23	Education (Work Experience) Act 1973	The whole act.
1973 c. 50	Employment and Training Act 1973	Sections 8, 9 and 10.
1973 c. 59	Education (Scotland) Act 1973	The whole act.
1973 c. 65	Local Government (Scotland) Act 1973	Section 129.
1975 c. 65	Sex Discrimination Act 1975	Schedule 11.
1975 c. 71	Employment Protection Act 1975	Section 79(6).
1976 c. 20	Education (Scotland) Act 1976	The whole act.
1976 c. 65	Retirement of Teachers (Scotland) Act 1976	The whole act.
1977 c. 45	Criminal Law Act 1977	Schedule 6 so far as relating to the Education (Scotland) Act 1962.
1978 c. 29	National Health Service (Scotland) Act 1978	In Schedule 15, in paragraph 10(b) the words "126, 127". In Schedule 16, paragraphs 15 to 18.
1980 c. 20	Education Act 1980	Section 20. Section 23. Section 25. Section 31(5)–(6). Section 33(2). Sections 35, 37 and 38.
