= Education Act 1976 =

Act of the Parliament of the United Kingdom

Education Act 1976 (Note: Section 12(1).)
- Act of Parliament
- Parliament of the United Kingdom
- Long title: An Act to amend the law relating to education.
- Citation: 1976 c. 81
- Introduced by: Fred Mulley (Commons)
- Territorial extent: England and Wales (Note: Section 12(4).)

Dates
- Royal assent: 22 November 1976
- Commencement: 22 November 1976 (Note: The Acts of Parliament (Commencement) Act 1793.)
- Repealed: 1 November 1996
Other legislation
Amends	Education Act 1944; Education (Miscellaneous Provisions) Act 1953; Education Act 1962
Amended by	Education Act 1979; Education Act 1980
Repealed by	Education Act 1996

Status: Repealed

Text of statute as originally enacted

Revised text of statute as amended

The Education Act 1976 (c. 81) was an act of the Parliament of the United Kingdom relating to education in England and Wales. The act gave the Secretary of State for Education the power to require local education authorities to plan for non-selective (i.e., comprehensive) secondary education. This was a significant step in the Labour government's attempt to abolish selection by ability and end the tripartite system.

== Passage ==
An education bill was formulated in December 1975 by the then-Secretary of State for Education, Fred Mulley. The Education Bill received its second reading in the House of Commons on 4 February 1976, where Mulley declared that the Bill's foremost intention was to "give effect to the Government's policy on comprehensive education". The Bill received Royal assent on 22 November 1976, by which time Shirley Williams had taken over as Secretary of State for Education and Science.

== Effects of the act ==
=== Comprehensive education ===
The primary impact of the act was the establishment of the "comprehensive principle" in law. Section 1 of the act explicitly stated that local education authorities "shall, in the exercise and performance of their powers and duties relating to secondary education, have regard to the general principle that such education is to be provided only in schools where the arrangements for the admission of pupils are not based (wholly or partly) on selection by reference to ability or aptitude".

On 25 November 1976, just days after the act received Royal Assent, the Department for Education and Science issued Circular 11/76. This required local authorities that had not yet submitted schemes for comprehensive reorganisation to do so. The act sought to complete the transition away from grammar schools and secondary moderns and legally enforce the abolition of the Eleven-plus examination, a transition process which had been heavily promoted via voluntary requests to local authorities since 1965.

=== Repeal ===
The compulsion for local education authorities to go comprehensive was short-lived. Following the Conservative victory in the 1979 United Kingdom general election, the new government led by Margaret Thatcher passed the Education Act 1979, which formally repealed Sections 1, 2, and 3 of the 1976 Act. This removed the legal requirement for comprehensive reorganisation and restored the right of local authorities to retain selective secondary schools.

== Subsequent developments ==
The whole act was repealed by section 582(2) of, and part I of schedule 38 to, the Education Act 1996, which came into force on 1 November 1996.
