= Education (Miscellaneous Provisions) Act 1948 =

Act of the Parliament of the United Kingdom

Education (Miscellaneous Provisions) Act 1948 (Note: Section 14(1).)
- Act of Parliament
- Parliament of the United Kingdom
- Long title: An Act to amend the Education Acts, 1944 and 1946, the Endowed Schools Acts, 1869 to 1908, the provisions of the Mental Deficiency Act, 1913, as to children incapable of receiving education, and the provision of the Children and Young Persons' Act, 1933, as to the minimum age of employment.
- Citation: 11 & 12 Geo. 6. c. 40
- Territorial extent: England and Wales (Note: Section 14(5).)

Dates
- Royal assent: 30 June 1948
- Commencement: 30 June 1948 (Note: The Acts of Parliament (Commencement) Act 1793.)
- Repealed: 1 November 1996
Other legislation
Amended by	Mental Health Act 1959; Charities Act 1960; Statute Law (Repeals) Act 1975; Statute Law (Repeals) Act 1978; Education Act 1980; Further and Higher Education Act 1992
Repealed by	Education Act 1996

Status: Repealed

Text of statute as originally enacted

Revised text of statute as amended

The Education (Miscellaneous Provisions) Act 1948 (11 & 12 Geo. 6. c. 40) was an act of the Parliament of the United Kingdom. It was passed during the Labour government of Clement Attlee. Amongst other provisions, it empowered local authorities to provide items of clothing in cases where pupils were unable due to the unsuitability or inadequacy of their clothing to take full advantage of the education provided at their schools.

The act was repealed on 1 November 1996 by the Education Act 1996.

== Subsequent developments ==
The whole act was repealed by section 582(2) of, and part I of schedule 38 to, the Education Act 1996, which came into force on 1 November 1996.
