= Education Act 1964 =

Act of the Parliament of the United Kingdom

Education Act 1964 (Note: Section 5(1).)
- Act of Parliament
- Parliament of the United Kingdom
- Long title: An Act to enable county schools and voluntary schools to be established for providing full-time education by reference to age-limits differing from those specified in the Education Act 1944, as amended by the Education (Miscellaneous Provisions) Act 1948; to enable maintenance allowances to be granted in respect of pupils at special schools who would be over compulsory school age, or, in Scotland, over school age, but for section 38(1) of the said Act of 1944 or section 32(4) of the Education (Scotland) Act 1962; and for purposes connected with the matters aforesaid.
- Citation: 1964 c. 82
- Territorial extent: England and Wales; Scotland; (Note: Section 5(7).)

Dates
- Royal assent: 31 July 1964
- Commencement: 31 July 1964 (Note: The Acts of Parliament (Commencement) Act 1793.)
- Repealed: 1 November 1996
Other legislation
Amended by	Statute Law (Repeals) Act 1978; Education (Scotland) Act 1980
Repealed by	Education Act 1996

Status: Repealed

Text of statute as originally enacted

Revised text of statute as amended

The Education Act 1964 (c. 82) was an act of the Parliament of the United Kingdom. It made provisions in two areas which were previously not permitted by the Education Act 1944 (7 & 8 Geo. 6. c. 31). These provisions included the setting up of Middle Schools, and the funding of education for pupils in Special Schools beyond compulsory school age.

== Subsequent developments ==
The whole act was repealed by section 582(2) of, and part I of schedule 38 to, the Education Act 1996, which came into force on 1 November 1996.
