= Prisoners' Earnings Act 1996 =

Act of the Parliament of the United Kingdom

Prisoners' Earnings Act 1996 (Note: Section 5(1).)
- Act of Parliament
- Parliament of the United Kingdom
- Long title: An Act to authorise deductions from or levies on prisoners' earnings; to provide for the application of such deductions or levies; and for connected purposes.
- Citation: 1996 c. 33
- Territorial extent: England and Wales; Scotland; (Note: Section 5(3).)

Dates
- Royal assent: 18 July 1996
- Commencement: 26 September 2011 (England and Wales) (Note: Section 5(2). The Prisoners' Earnings Act 1996 (Commencement) (England and Wales) Order 2011 (SI 2011/1658).)
Other legislation
Amended by	Child Support, Pensions and Social Security Act 2000; Children (Care and Justice) (Scotland) Act 2024

Status: Amended

Text of statute as originally enacted

Text of the Prisoners' Earnings Act 1996 as in force today (including any amendments) within the United Kingdom, from legislation.gov.uk.

The Prisoners' Earnings Act 1996 (c. 33) is an act of the Parliament of the United Kingdom. The purpose of the act was to allow the government to apply deductions and levies on the earnings of prisoners in respect of work carried by the prisoner during his period of detention. The act was not implemented until 2011.

== History ==
The act was passed in 1996; it received royal assent in July of that year, and was expected to be implemented in spring 1997. However, it was not put into force before the 1997 general election. In 2000 the Home Office reported it was studying implementing the act, whilst in 2008 the Ministry of Justice announced that the complicated nature of the act suggested it would cost an unreasonable amount to administer.

The Conservative Party stated their intention to implement the act in their manifesto for the 2010 general election, and secured an agreement with the Liberal Democrats to make it part of their joint coalition agreement. A statutory instrument dated 5 July specified 26 September 2011 as the commencement date for the act.

Subsequent to the act commencing, it was expected to result in a 40% pay cut for 500 prisoners, and was expected to raise up to £1m a year.

== Provisions ==
When a prisoner carries out a task or duty within a prison, such as catering or cleaning, and receives payment for this, the government may subject the earnings to deductions for: income tax, national insurance, court order payments, and child maintenance. Section 1 of the act allows a deduction, or a levy where the earnings are not paid by the governor on behalf of the Secretary of State, of up to a prescribed percentage of net weekly earnings in excess of a prescribed amount, where the earnings are for "enhanced wages work" that is not directed work. The monies raised from the deductions and levies are to be used for: payments to voluntary organisations concerned with victim support or crime prevention; payments to the Consolidated Fund to help pay towards the cost of the prisoner's upkeep; payments to any of the prisoner's dependants; or payments to an investment account on behalf of the prisoner for their benefit on release (section 2). A prisoner who is aggrieved by the governor's determination of their dependants may appeal to the Secretary of State, and section 3 requires the governor to provide weekly statements of account.

The act extends to Great Britain only and has no application in Northern Ireland. It was brought into force in England and Wales only, and has not been brought into force in Scotland.

== See also ==
- UK labour law
