= Apprenticeships, Skills, Children and Learning Act 2009 =

Act of the Parliament of the United Kingdom

Apprenticeships, Skills, Children and Learning Act 2009 (Note: Section 270(1).)
- Act of Parliament
- Parliament of the United Kingdom
- Long title: An Act to make provision about apprenticeships, education, training and children's services; to amend the Employment Rights Act 1996; to establish the Young People's Learning Agency for England, the office of Chief Executive of Skills Funding, the Office of Qualifications and Examinations Regulation and the School Support Staff Negotiating Body and to make provision about those bodies and that office; to make provision about the Qualifications and Curriculum Authority; to make provision about schools and institutions within the further education sector; to make provision about student loans; and for connected purposes.
- Citation: 2009 c. 22
- Introduced by: Ed Balls MP, Secretary of State for Children, Schools and Families (Commons); Baroness Morgan of Drefelin (Lords)
- Territorial extent: England and Wales (mainly); Scotland (partially); Northern Ireland (partially); (Note: Section 260.)

Dates
- Royal assent: 12 November 2009
- Commencement: Various (Note: Section 269.)
Other legislation
Amends	House of Commons Disqualification Act 1975; Further and Higher Education Act 1992; Employment Tribunals Act 1996; Employment Rights Act 1996; Education Act 1996
Amended by	Academies Act 2010; Charities Act 2011; Digital Economy Act 2017; Education and Training (Welfare of Children) Act 2021; Institute for Apprenticeships and Technical Education (Transfer of Functions etc) Act 2025

Status: Amended

History of passage through Parliament

Text of statute as originally enacted

Revised text of statute as amended

The Apprenticeships, Skills, Children and Learning Act 2009 (c. 22) is an act of the Parliament of the United Kingdom. It alters the law relating to education.

The precursors of this act were the white paper "Raising Expectations: Enabling the system to deliver" published in March 2008 and a "Draft Apprenticeships Bill" published in July of that year.

== Provisions ==
The act established the Chief Executive of Skills Funding.

The act introduced minimum hours of work and learning for apprenticeships.

The act established the School Support Staff Negotiating Body. The measure had been announced in 2007, and intended to facilitate the improvement of terms and conditions for support staff.

== Reception ==
The legislation was criticised by Labour peer Baroness Wilkins for potentially excluding disabled people, such as deaf people whose first language is British Sign Language and may not meet the requirement to have a GCSE in English.

== See also ==
- Education Act
