= Hong Kong (Overseas Public Servants) Act 1996 =

Act of the Parliament of the United Kingdom

Hong Kong (Overseas Public Servants) Act 1996 (Note: Section 8.)
- Act of Parliament
- Parliament of the United Kingdom
- Long title: An Act to confer power to make provision for the making of payments to, and to permit early retirement by, certain Hong Kong overseas public servants; to authorise the provision of resettlement services to certain Hong Kong overseas public servants who retire early; and to confer power to make provision for the making in certain circumstances of payments to supplement pensions and gratuities paid to or in respect of retired overseas public servants in respect of service in Hong Kong.
- Citation: 1996 c. 2
- Territorial extent: United Kingdom

Dates
- Royal assent: 29 February 1996
- Commencement: 29 February 1996 (Note: Section 4(b) of the Interpretation Act 1978.)
Other legislation
Amended by	Statute Law (Repeals) Act 2004

Status: Amended

Text of statute as originally enacted

Revised text of statute as amended

Text of the Hong Kong (Overseas Public Servants) Act 1996 as in force today (including any amendments) within the United Kingdom, from legislation.gov.uk.

The Hong Kong (Overseas Public Servants) Act 1996 (c. 2) is an act of the Parliament of the United Kingdom. The act sets out pensions for public servants in then British Hong Kong for after the handover of Hong Kong to ensure that public servants in Hong Kong continued to receive pensions from the British Government.

The act

== Provisions ==
The act allows for the Secretary of State, to make payments to supplement pensions for Hong Kong overseas public servants.

Additionally, the act allows for an Order in Council under this act to make provision for the amount of payments given.

An Order in Council may make different provision in relation to different cases, may except specified cases from any of its provisions, and may contain provisions which are incidental or supplementary.
