= Education Act 1980 =

Act of the Parliament of the United Kingdom

Education Act 1980 (Note: Section 38(1).)
- Act of Parliament
- Parliament of the United Kingdom
- Long title: An Act to amend the law relating to education.
- Citation: 1980 c. 20
- Territorial extent: England and Wales; Scotland (in part); Northern Ireland (in part); (Note: Section 38(7).)

Dates
- Royal assent: 3 April 1980
- Commencement: various (Note: Section 37.)
Other legislation
Amends	Education Act 1944; Education Act 1946; Education (Miscellaneous Provisions) Act 1948; Education (Miscellaneous Provisions) Act 1953; Local Government Act 1958; Education (Scotland) Act 1962; London Government Act 1963; Local Government Act 1966; Education Act 1968; Education Act 1973; Education Act 1975; Sex Discrimination Act 1975; Education (Scotland) Act 1976; Education Act 1976
Repeals/revokes	Education (Milk) Act 1971
Amended by	Education (Scotland) Act 1980; Building Act 1984; Tribunals and Inquiries Act 1992; Employment Tribunals Act 1996; Employment Rights Act 1996; Education Act 1996

Status: Amended

Text of statute as originally enacted

Revised text of statute as amended

Text of the Education Act 1980 as in force today (including any amendments) within the United Kingdom, from legislation.gov.uk.

The Education Act 1980 (c. 20) is an act of the Parliament of the United Kingdom relating to education in England and Wales. The act gave local authorities greater autonomy, and had a large effect on the lives of children.

== Passage through Parliament ==
The Education Bill referred to education in England, Wales and Scotland. The Education Bill received its second reading on 5 November 1979. In mid-February 1980, the Bill was in the Report Stage, and passing through the House of Lords in late February 1980, and the Committee Stage in the second week of March 1980. The House of Lords sat late into the evening on Monday 10 March and Tuesday 11 March 1980, with 299 amendments. The Third Reading of the Bill was passed on Monday, 31 March 1980.

== Effects of the act ==
=== School meals ===
Section 22 of the Education Act 1980 gave local education authorities in England and Wales discretion to provide school meals and set charges for them. However, authorities remained required to provide midday food for pupils whose parents received supplementary benefit or family income supplement. The NAHT believed that children being allowed to bring in snack food for lunchtime, instead of being given appropriate meals, would be unsuitable for their health. The NAHT threatened that its headteachers could ban snack food.

Caroline Walker, a nutritionist and food campaigner said that - left to their own devices, many children will buy sugary and/or fatty foods for lunch. In many cases, that would largely happen.
