= Judicial Pensions and Retirement Act 1993 =

Act of the Parliament of the United Kingdom

Judicial Pensions and Retirement Act 1993 (Note: Section 31(1).)
- Act of Parliament
- Parliament of the United Kingdom
- Long title: An Act to make further provision with respect to the pensions and other benefits payable in respect of service in certain judicial, and related, offices and in certain senior public investigative offices; to amend the law relating to the date on which the holders of certain judicial, and related, offices are required to vacate those offices; and for purposes connected therewith.
- Citation: 1993 c. 8
- Territorial extent: England and Wales; Northern Ireland; (Note: Section 31.)

Dates
- Royal assent: 29 March 1993
- Commencement: 31 March 1995 (Note: Section 31(2). The Judicial Pensions and Retirement Act 1993 (Commencement) Order 1995.)

Other legislation
- Amends: Misuse of Drugs Act 1971; Pensions (Increase) Act 1971; Industry Act 1975; Senior Courts Act 1981; County Courts Act 1984; Social Security Administration Act 1992
- Repeals/revokes: Judicial Pensions Act 1959
- Amended by: Health Service Commissioners Act 1993; Pension Schemes Act 1993; Pension Schemes (Northern Ireland) Act 1993; Value Added Tax Act 1994; Insurance Companies (Third Insurance Directives) Regulations 1994; Merchant Shipping Act 1995; Judicial Pensions (Qualifying Judicial Offices etc.) (City of London) Order 1995; Employment Tribunals Act 1996; Education Act 1996; School Inspections Act 1996; Industrial Tribunals (Northern Ireland) Order 1996; Justices of the Peace Act 1997; Plant Varieties Act 1997; Social Security Act 1998; Employment Rights (Dispute Resolution) Act 1998; Data Protection Act 1998; Social Security (Northern Ireland) Order 1998; Fair Employment and Treatment (Northern Ireland) Order 1998; Access to Justice Act 1999; Immigration and Asylum Act 1999; Judicial Pensions and Retirement Act 1993 (Addition of Qualifying Judicial Offices) Order 1999; Judicial Pensions (Qualifying Judicial Offices) (President of the Competition Commission Appeal Tribunals) Order 1999; Judicial Pensions and Retirement Act 1993 (Amendment) Regulations 2000; Armed Forces Act 2001; Financial Services and Markets Act 2000 (Consequential Amendments and Repeals) Order 2001; Land Registration Act 2002; Judicial Pensions (Pensions Appeal Tribunals) Order 2002; Courts Act 2003; Communications Act 2003; Judicial Pensions (Election against Benefits) Regulations 2003; Pensions Act 2004; Constitutional Reform Act 2005; Mental Capacity Act 2005; Civil Partnership (Judicial Pensions and Church Pensions, etc.) Order 2005; Enterprise Act 2002 (Judicial Pensions and Retirement Act 1993) (Consequential Amendment) Order 2005; Armed Forces Act 2006; Commons Act 2006; National Health Service (Consequential Provisions) Act 2006; Regulatory Reform (Agricultural Tenancies) (England and Wales) Order 2006; Taxation of Judicial Pensions (Consequential Provisions) Order 2006; Employment Equality (Age) Regulations 2006; Tribunals, Courts and Enforcement Act 2007; Judicial Pensions and Retirement Act 1993 (Addition of Qualifying Judicial Offices) (No.2) Order 2008; Northern Ireland Act 1998 (Devolution of Policing and Justice Functions) Order 2010; Pensions Act 2011; Pensions Act 2008 (Abolition of Protected Rights) (Consequential Amendments) (No.2) Order 2011; Financial Services Act 2012; Pensions (2008 No. 2 Act) (Abolition of Protected Rights) (Consequential Provisions) Order (Northern Ireland) 2012; Public Service Pensions Act 2013; Public Service Pensions Act (Northern Ireland) 2014; Tribunals (Scotland) Act 2014; Mines Regulations 2014; Judicial Pensions and Retirement Act 1993 (Part-time Sheriff, Stipendiary Magistrate and Justice of the Peace) Order 2014; Pension Schemes Act 2015; Judicial Pensions Regulations 2015; Judicial Pensions Regulations (Northern Ireland) 2015; Judicial Pensions and Retirement Act 1993 (Addition of Qualifying Judicial Offices) Order 2015; Wales Act 2017; Alteration of Judicial Titles (Registrar in Bankruptcy of the High Court) Order 2018

Status: Amended

Text of statute as originally enacted

Revised text of statute as amended

Text of the Judicial Pensions and Retirement Act 1993 as in force today (including any amendments) within the United Kingdom, from legislation.gov.uk.

The Judicial Pensions and Retirement Act 1993 (c. 8) is an act of the Parliament of the United Kingdom that strengthened the mandatory retirement provisions previously instituted by the Judicial Pensions Act 1959 (8 & 9 Eliz. 2. c. 9) for members of the British judiciary.

While the 1959 act forbade service past age 75 by any judges appointed thereafter (Lord Denning being the last exempt jurist in England, retiring in 1982. while in Scotland John Cameron, Lord Cameron retired in 1985), the 1993 act made the ordinary retirement age 70, and while enabling a minister (presumably the Lord Chancellor) to allow individual judges to remain in office until 75, it expressly forbids persons aged over 75 to hold any judicial post whatsoever. An exception is the post of Lord Chancellor, a political appointee (although the role is no longer judicial).

== Provisions ==
=== Short title, commencement and extent ===
Section 31(1) of the act provided that the act may be cited as the "Judicial Pensions and Retirement Act 1993".

Judicial Pensions and Retirement Act 1993 (Commencement) Order 1995
- Statutory Instrument
- Parliament of the United Kingdom
- Citation: SI 1995/631
- Territorial extent: United Kingdom

Dates
- Made: 7 March 1995
- Commencement: 31 March 1995

Other legislation
- Made under: Judicial Pensions and Retirement Act 1993

Status: Current legislation

Text of statute as originally enacted

Section 32(2) of the act provided that the act would come into force on a day appointed by the Secretary of State for Justice by statutory instrument. The Judicial Pensions and Retirement Act 1993 (Commencement) Order 1995 (SI 1995/631) provided that the act would come into force on 31 March 1995.
