= Education Act 1996 =

Act of the Parliament of the United Kingdom

Education Act 1996 (Note: Section 583(1).)
- Act of Parliament
- Parliament of the United Kingdom
- Long title: An Act to consolidate the Education Act 1944 and certain other enactments relating to education, with amendments to give effect to recommendations of the Law Commission.
- Citation: 1996 c. 56
- Territorial extent: England and Wales; Scotland (in part); Northern Ireland (in part); (Note: Section 583(5)–(7).)

Dates
- Royal assent: 24 July 1996
- Commencement: 1 November 1996 (in part); Various; (Note: Section 583(2)–(8).)
Other legislation
Amends	Pensions (Increase) Act 1971; Restrictive Trade Practices Act 1976; Domestic Proceedings and Magistrates' Courts Act 1978; Education (Scotland) Act 1980; Education (No. 2) Act 1986; Criminal Justice Act 1988; Town and Country Planning Act 1990; Further and Higher Education Act 1992; Value Added Tax Act 1994; Education Act 1994; Employment Rights Act 1996; See § Repealed enactments
Repeals/revokes	See § Repealed enactments
Amended by	List: Education Reform Act 1988; School Inspections Act 1996; Registration of Births, Deaths and Marriages (Fees) Order 1996; Education Act 1996 (Amendment) Order 1996; Education Act 1997; Education (Schools) Act 1997; Registration of Births, Deaths and Marriages (Fees) Order 1997; Education (Student Loans) Act 1998; Audit Commission Act 1998; Teaching and Higher Education Act 1998; School Standards and Framework Act 1998; Registration of Births, Deaths and Marriages (Fees) Order 1998; Tax Credits Act 1999; Immigration and Asylum Act 1999; Education Act 1996 (Grant-Maintained Schools) (Grants to Governing Bodies in Liquidation) (Modification) Regulations 1999; Education (References to Delegated Budgets and Revocation) Regulations 1999; Registration of Births, Deaths and Marriages (Fees) Order 1999; Powers of Criminal Courts (Sentencing) Act 2000; Care Standards Act 2000; Special Educational Needs and Disability Act 2001; Local Authorities (Executive and Alternative Arrangements) (Modification of Enactments and Other Provisions) (England) Order 2001; Land Registration Act 2002; Education Act 2002; Registration of Births, Deaths and Marriages (Fees) Order 2002; Local Government Act 2003; Anti-social Behaviour Act 2003; Health and Social Care (Community Health and Standards) Act 2003; Criminal Justice Act 2003; Enterprise Act 2002 (Consequential and Supplemental Provisions) Order 2003; Education Act 2002 (Modification and Transitional Provisions) (England) Regulations 2003; Higher Education Act 2004; Statute Law (Repeals) Act 2004; Sustainable and Secure Buildings Act 2004; Children Act 2004; Education Act 1996 (Electronic Communications) Order 2004; Constitutional Reform Act 2005; Inquiries Act 2005; Education Act 2005; Education Act 2002 (Transitional Provisions and Consequential Amendments) (Wales) Regulations 2005; National Council for Education and Training for Wales (Transfer of Functions to the National Assembly for Wales and Abolition) Order 2005; Qualifications, Curriculum and Assessment Authority for Wales (Transfer of Functions to the National Assembly for Wales and Abolition) Order 2005; Childcare Act 2006; Violent Crime Reduction Act 2006; Education and Inspections Act 2006; National Health Service (Consequential Provisions) Act 2006; Welfare Reform Act 2007; Tribunals, Courts and Enforcement Act 2007; References to Health Authorities Order 2007; Education Act 1996 (Amendment of Section 19) (England) Regulations 2007; Criminal Justice and Immigration Act 2008; Special Educational Needs (Information) Act 2008; Statute Law (Repeals) Act 2008; Education and Skills Act 2008; Local Transport Act 2008; Transfer of Tribunal Functions Order 2008; Legislative Reform (Local Authority Consent Requirements) (England and Wales) Order 2008; Learner Travel (Wales) Measure 2008; Apprenticeships, Skills, Children and Learning Act 2009; Welfare Reform Act 2009; Companies Act 2006 (Consequential Amendments, Transitional Provisions and Savings) Order 2009; Healthy Eating in Schools (Wales) Measure 2009; Education (Wales) Measure 2009; Child Poverty Act 2010; Children, Schools and Families Act 2010; Academies Act 2010; Registration of Births, Deaths and Marriages (Fees) Order 2010; Charities Act 2006 (Principal Regulators of Exempt Charities) Regulations 2010; Apprenticeships, Skills, Children and Learning Act 2009 (Consequential Amendments) (England and Wales) Order 2010; Local Education Authorities and Children's Services Authorities (Integration of Functions) Order 2010; Equality Act 2010 (Consequential Amendments, Saving and Supplementary Provisions) Order 2010; Education Act 2011; Charities Act 2011; Charities Act 2006 (Principal Regulators of Exempt Charities) Regulations 2011; Education (Wales) Measure 2011; Welfare Reform Act 2012; Health and Social Care Act 2012; Alternative Provision Academies (Consequential Amendments to Acts) (England) Order 2012; Crime and Courts Act 2013; Health and Social Care Act 2012 (Consequential Amendments) Order 2013; Anti-Social Behaviour Act 2003 (Amendment to the Education Act 1996) (Wales) Order 2013; Transfer of Functions (Youth Leisure-time Activities) Order 2013; School Standards and Organisation (Wales) Act 2013; Children and Families Act 2014; Education (Wales) Act 2014; Children and Young People (Scotland) Act 2014; Deregulation Act 2015; English Apprenticeships (Consequential Amendments to Primary Legislation) Order 2015; Higher Education (Wales) Act 2015; Violence against Women, Domestic Abuse and Sexual Violence (Wales) Act 2015; Qualifications Wales Act 2015; Immigration Act 2016; Social Services and Well-being (Wales) Act 2014 (Consequential Amendments) Regulations 2016; Transfer of Functions (Elections, Referendums, Third Sector and Information) Order 2016; Childcare (Early Years Provision Free of Charge) (Extended Entitlement) Regulations 2016; Wales Act 2017; Higher Education and Research Act 2017; Additional Learning Needs and Education Tribunal (Wales) Act 2018; Relationships Education, Relationships and Sex Education and Health Education (England) Regulations 2019; Higher Education and Research Act 2017 (Further Implementation etc.) Regulations 2019; Sentencing Act 2020; Diocesan Boards of Education Measure 2021; Curriculum and Assessment (Wales) Act 2021; Education (Guidance about Costs of School Uniforms) Act 2021; Public Service Pensions and Judicial Offices Act 2022; Health and Care Act 2022; Curriculum and Assessment (Wales) Act 2021 (Consequential Amendments) (Primary Legislation) Regulations 2022; Tertiary Education and Research (Wales) Act 2022; Data (Use and Access) Act 2025; Welsh Language and Education (Wales) Act 2025; Legislation (Procedure, Publication and Repeals) (Wales) Act 2025; Children's Wellbeing and Schools Act 2026; English Devolution and Community Empowerment Act 2026
Relates to	School Inspections Act 1996

Status: Amended

Text of statute as originally enacted

Text of the Education Act 1996 as in force today (including any amendments) within the United Kingdom, from legislation.gov.uk.

The Education Act 1996 (c. 56) is an act of the Parliament of the United Kingdom, introduced under the second John Major government. It led to the establishment of special local authorities, who for example would identify children with special educational needs.

== Provisions ==
=== Repealed enactments ===
Section 582(2) of the act repealed 61 enactments, listed in parts I and II of schedule 38 to the act.

Repeals coming into force on 1st November 1996
Citation	Short title	Extent of repeal
7 & 8 Geo. 6. c. 31	Education Act 1944	The whole act.
9 & 10 Geo. 6. c. 49	Acquisition of Land (Authorisation Procedure) Act 1946	In Schedule 4, the entry relating to the Education Act 1944.
9 & 10 Geo. 6. c. 50	Education Act 1946	The whole act.
11 & 12 Geo. 6. c. 40	Education (Miscellaneous Provisions) Act 1948	The whole act.
1 & 2 Eliz. 2. c. 33	Education (Miscellaneous Provisions) Act 1953	The whole act.
7 & 8 Eliz. 2. c. 53	Town and Country Planning Act 1959	In Schedule 4, paragraph 4.
7 & 8 Eliz. 2. c. 60	Education Act 1959	The whole act.
9 & 10 Eliz. 2. c. 45	Rating and Valuation Act 1961	The whole act.
10 & 11 Eliz. 2. c. 12	Education Act 1962	Section 9.
10 & 11 Eliz. 2. c. 12	Education Act 1962	Section 13(4).
10 & 11 Eliz. 2. c. 12	Education Act 1962	Section 14(2).
1963 c. 37	Children and Young Persons Act 1963	Section 38(2).
1964 c. 82	Education Act 1964	The whole act.
1967 c. 3	Education Act 1967	Section 2.
1967 c. 3	Education Act 1967	In section 6(1), the words from "and this Act" onwards.
1967 c. 80	Criminal Justice Act 1967	In Part I of Schedule 3, the entry relating to the Education Act 1944.
1968 c. 17	Education Act 1968	The whole act.
1968 c. xxxix	Greater London Council (General Powers) Act 1968	Section 56.
1970 c. 42	Local Authority Social Services Act 1970	In Schedule 1, the entry relating to the Education Act 1993.
1970 c. 52	Education (Handicapped Children) Act 1970	The whole act.
1972 c. 70	Local Government Act 1972	Section 192.
1973 c. 16	Education Act 1973	Section 1(2).
1973 c. 16	Education Act 1973	Section 2.
1973 c. 16	Education Act 1973	In section 5(1), the words from ", and the Education Acts" onwards.
1973 c. 16	Education Act 1973	In Schedule 1, paragraph 3.
1973 c. 23	Education (Work Experience) Act 1973	The whole act.
1975 c. 2	Education Act 1975	The whole act.
1976 c. 5	Education (School-leaving Dates) Act 1976	The whole act.
1976 c. 81	Education Act 1976	The whole act.
1977 c. 49	National Health Service Act 1977	In Schedule 14, in paragraph 13(1)(b) "7 to 9".
1977 c. 49	National Health Service Act 1977	In Schedule 15, paragraphs 2 and 3.
1979 c. 49	Education Act 1979	The whole act.
1980 c. 20	Education Act 1980	Sections 1 to 18.
1980 c. 20	Education Act 1980	Sections 21 and 22.
1980 c. 20	Education Act 1980	Section 24.
1980 c. 20	Education Act 1980	Section 26.
1980 c. 20	Education Act 1980	Sections 28 to 30.
1980 c. 20	Education Act 1980	Section 33(3).
1980 c. 20	Education Act 1980	Sections 34 and 35.
1980 c. 20	Education Act 1980	Section 37.
1980 c. 20	Education Act 1980	In section 38, subsections (2) and (4) to (6).
1980 c. 20	Education Act 1980	Schedules 1 to 4.
1980 c. 20	Education Act 1980	Schedule 7.
1980 c. 65	Local Government, Planning and Land Act 1980	Section 2(3).
1981 c. 60	Education Act 1981	The whole act.
1982 c. 48	Criminal Justice Act 1982	In Schedule 3, the entries relating to the Education Act 1944.
1984 c. 11	Education (Grants and Awards) Act 1984	The whole act.
1985 c. 47	Further Education Act 1985	Section 8(2).
1986 c. 50	Social Security Act 1986	Section 77 so far as relating to section 22 of the Education Act 1980.
1986 c. 61	Education (No. 2) Act 1986	Sections 1 to 42.
1986 c. 61	Education (No. 2) Act 1986	Sections 44 to 47.
1986 c. 61	Education (No. 2) Act 1986	Sections 51 to 60.
1986 c. 61	Education (No. 2) Act 1986	In section 62(1), paragraph (a) and the "(b)" immediately following it.
1986 c. 61	Education (No. 2) Act 1986	In section 63, in subsection (1) the words "(other than under section 2(7), 9(6) or 54)", in subsection (2) "51 or", and subsection (2A).
1986 c. 61	Education (No. 2) Act 1986	In section 65(1), all the definitions except that of "establishment of higher or further education".
1986 c. 61	Education (No. 2) Act 1986	In section 66, in subsection (1) "60 and" and "to (3)", and in subsection (2) "and 59".
1986 c. 61	Education (No. 2) Act 1986	In section 67, subsections (2), (5) and (6).
1986 c. 61	Education (No. 2) Act 1986	Schedules 1 to 3.
1986 c. 61	Education (No. 2) Act 1986	In Schedule 4, paragraphs 1, 2 and 5.
1986 c. 61	Education (No. 2) Act 1986	Schedules 5 and 6.
1987 c. 15	Reverter of Sites Act 1987	Section 8(1).
1988 c. 40	Education Reform Act 1988	Part I.
1988 c. 40	Education Reform Act 1988	Section 120(5) and (9).
1988 c. 40	Education Reform Act 1988	In section 210, in each of subsections (1) and (3)(d) the words "local education authorities or".
1988 c. 40	Education Reform Act 1988	In section 211, paragraphs (a) and (b) and the words "the school or".
1988 c. 40	Education Reform Act 1988	Sections 212 and 213.
1988 c. 40	Education Reform Act 1988	In section 218, in subsection (1) in each of paragraphs (e) and (f) the words "schools and" and paragraph (g), in subsection (7) the words from "or, in such cases" to "the funding authority" and the words "school or" (where first occurring) and "any school or", and subsections (8) and (13).
1988 c. 40	Education Reform Act 1988	Section 222.
1988 c. 40	Education Reform Act 1988	Sections 225 and 227.
1988 c. 40	Education Reform Act 1988	Section 229(1).
1988 c. 40	Education Reform Act 1988	In section 230(1), "section 15(2)".
1988 c. 40	Education Reform Act 1988	In section 232, subsection (3) and, in subsection (4)(b), "3(4)(a), 4(2)(c), 24".
1988 c. 40	Education Reform Act 1988	Section 234.
1988 c. 40	Education Reform Act 1988	In section 235, in subsection (1) the definition of "the 1980 Act".
1988 c. 40	Education Reform Act 1988	In section 236, in subsection (1) the words from "section 1" to "section 119" and "sections 212 and 213", and subsections (2) and (3).
1988 c. 40	Education Reform Act 1988	Section 238(2).
1988 c. 40	Education Reform Act 1988	Schedules 1 to 4.
1988 c. 40	Education Reform Act 1988	In Schedule 12, paragraphs 1 to 8, 14, 17, 24, 25, 34, 35, 37, 54 to 62, 69(4), 76, 77, 81, 82, 87(3), 99, 102, 103 and 106.
1989 c. 41	Children Act 1989	In Schedule 13, paragraphs 9 and 10.
1989 c. 42	Local Government and Housing Act 1989	In section 13(9), the definition of "foundation governors" and the "and" immediately following it.
1989 c. 42	Local Government and Housing Act 1989	Section 188.
1990 c. 6	Education (Student Loans) Act 1990	Section 4(2).
1990 c. 19	National Health Service and Community Care Act 1990	In Schedule 9, paragraph 31.
1990 c. 38	Employment Act 1990	Section 14.
1990 c. 38	Employment Act 1990	In section 18(2), the words from "section 14" to "experience)".
1991 c. 21	Disability Living Allowance and Disability Working Allowance Act 1991	In Schedule 3, paragraph 12.
1991 c. 49	School Teachers' Pay and Conditions Act 1991	Section 6(2).
1991 No. 2	Diocesan Boards of Education Measure 1991	In section 10(1), the definition of "the 1988 Act".
1992 c. 13	Further and Higher Education Act 1992	Sections 10 to 14.
1992 c. 13	Further and Higher Education Act 1992	Section 59.
1992 c. 13	Further and Higher Education Act 1992	In section 92, the entries for "pupil", "secondary education" and "school".
1992 c. 13	Further and Higher Education Act 1992	Section 94(2).
1992 c. 13	Further and Higher Education Act 1992	In Schedule 8, paragraphs 1 to 17, 24 to 26, 28, 43(b), 50, 53, 54, 56, 57 and 82.
1992 c. 38	Education (Schools) Act 1992	Section 16.
1992 c. 38	Education (Schools) Act 1992	In Schedule 4, paragraphs 1 and 4 to 6.
1993 c. 8	Judicial Pensions and Retirement Act 1993	In Schedule 6, paragraph 51.
1993 c. 10	Charities Act 1993	In Schedule 2, paragraphs (e) and (g).
1993 c. 35	Education Act 1993	The whole act.
1994 c. 19	Local Government (Wales) Act 1994	Section 21.
1994 c. 19	Local Government (Wales) Act 1994	In Schedule 16, paragraphs 8 and 105.
1994 c. 30	Education Act 1994	Section 27(2).
1994 c. 30	Education Act 1994	In Schedule 2, paragraphs 5(2) and (4)(a), 6(2) and (4)(a) and 8(2) to (4).
1995 c. 17	Health Authorities Act 1995	In Schedule 1, paragraphs 112 and 124.
1995 c. 18	Jobseekers Act 1995	In Schedule 2, paragraphs 3 and 17.
1995 c. 21	Merchant Shipping Act 1995	In Schedule 13, paragraph 48.
1995 c. 50	Disability Discrimination Act 1995	Section 29(1) and (2).
1995 c. 50	Disability Discrimination Act 1995	Section 30(7) to (9).
1996 c. 9	Education (Student Loans) Act 1996	Section 4(2).
1996 c. 18	Employment Rights Act 1996	In Schedule 1, paragraph 59.
1996 c. 23	Arbitration Act 1996	In Schedule 3, paragraphs 4 and 59.
1996 c. 50	Nursery Education and Grant-Maintained Schools Act 1996	Section 7.
1996 c. 50	Nursery Education and Grant-Maintained Schools Act 1996	In Schedule 3, paragraphs 1 to 8 and 10 to 15.

Repeals coming into force on appointed day
Citation	Short title	Extent of repeal
1975 c. 65	Sex Discrimination Act 1975	In section 82(1), the definition of "upper limit of compulsory school age".
1976 c. 74	Race Relations Act 1976	In section 78(1), the definition of "upper limit of compulsory school age".
1995 c. 36	Children (Scotland) Act 1995	In Schedule 4, paragraph 10(a).
