= Academies Act 2010 =

Act of the Parliament of the United Kingdom

Academies Act 2010 (Note: Section 20(1).)
- Act of Parliament
- Parliament of the United Kingdom
- Long title: An Act to make provision about Academies.
- Citation: 2010 c. 32§
- Introduced by: Michael Gove MP, Secretary of State for Education (Commons); Lord Wallace of Saltaire (Lords)
- Territorial extent: England and Wales (Note: Section 21.)

Dates
- Royal assent: 27 July 2010
- Commencement: 29 July 2010; 1 September 2010; 1 January 2011; (Note: Section 19. The Academies Act 2010 (Commencement and Transitional Provisions) Order 2010, amended by the Academies Act 2010 (Commencement and Transitional Provisions) (Amendment) Order 2010.)
Other legislation
Amends	Charities Act 1993; Education Act 1996; School Standards and Framework Act 1998; Freedom of Information Act 2000; Education Act 2002; Education Act 2005; Education and Inspections Act 2006; Apprenticeships, Skills, Children and Learning Act 2009; Children, Schools and Families Act 2010
Amended by	Charities Act 2011; Secure 16 to 19 Academies Act 2026
Relates to	Education Act 1996; School Standards and Framework Act 1998; Education Act 2002; Education Act 2005; Education and Inspections Act 2006; Apprenticeships, Skills, Children and Learning Act 2009; Children, Schools and Families Act 2010

Status: Amended

History of passage through Parliament

Text of statute as originally enacted

Revised text of statute as amended

The Academies Act 2010 (c. 32) is an act of the Parliament of the United Kingdom. It aims to make it possible for all publicly funded schools in England to become academies, still publicly funded but with a vastly increased degree of autonomy in issues such as setting teachers' wages and diverging from the National Curriculum. The act is inspired by the Swedish free school system. Journalist Mike Baker described it as a "recreation of grant-maintained schools".

It was among the first government bills introduced in the 55th United Kingdom Parliament by the Conservative – Liberal Democrat coalition government. The bill was presented by Jonathan Hill, Baron Hill of Oareford in the House of Lords, where it had its third reading on 13 July. It was read a third time in the House of Commons on 26 July. The act received Royal Assent on the following day and was brought into force in the most part on 29 July.

Angela Harrison, education correspondent for the BBC, has said that the act "could be the most radical overhaul of schools in England for a generation".

== Provisions ==
An Academy may be set up under section 1 of the act by virtue of an agreement between the Secretary of State for Education and any other person. Alternatively, maintained schools may be converted into academies by an Academy Order made under section 4 of the act, provided that the governing body of the school has applied under section 3 or the school is eligible for intervention under sections 60-62 of the Education and Inspections Act 2006. Academies established under section 1 will be charities in addition to receiving funding from the central government. Academies will also be free to set their own curriculum, as long as it is "broad and balanced" meeting the standards set in section 78 of the Education Act 2002. The act will only affect schools in England.

== Initial schools ==
Prior to the 2010 General Election there were 203 academies in England. After the election the new Education Secretary Michael Gove sent a letter to all publicly funded schools inviting them to become academies. Within three weeks, 70% of all outstanding secondary schools expressed interest. Of the 1,567 schools initially expressing interest, 828 were rated "outstanding" and could be fast-tracked into academies by September 2010. An analysis of the list applicants for academy status by the Times Educational Supplement reported that the list was "dominated" by schools from middle class areas, particularly the Home Counties. For example, 12% of schools in Kent applied compared to less than 2% in Middlesbrough. A later list published by the Department for Education said a total of 1,907 schools had expressed an interest.

By 23 July 2010, 153 schools in England had applied for academy status. The list included 12 faith schools and more than 20 grammar schools. Ultimately, 32 new academies (including seven primary schools) opened under the provisions of the act in the autumn term of 2010. A further 110 schools (including 40 primaries) are planned to convert at a later date. By January 2011 a total of 407 primary and secondary schools with academy status existed (twice as many as before the 2010 election), with the 371 secondary academies representing 11% of the total number of secondary schools.

== Reaction and analysis ==
Opposition MPs and the Conservative chair of the Education Select Committee Graham Stuart accused the government of "rushing" the bill through Parliament, to which the government replied that there was "ample time" to debate the bill. Julian Glover said the "rush hides not the enormity but the thinness of the measure; opposition outrage enhancing the impression that something big must be under way" and the act "concedes no new powers of any importance".

The act aims to enshrine greater freedoms for schools given academy status. Janet Daley says this will liberate schools from "monolithic local authority control" while journalist Toby Young said the act will revitalise the goal of the existing academies system to provide an increased level of choice for parents. Professor Alan Smithers of the University of Buckingham said that the plan to increase autonomy for a select number of schools will be divisive and disadvantaged children would lose out. Supporters say that the "pupil premium" (which is not included within the Academies Act but will be brought forward in forthcoming legislation) will countermand this by allocating extra funds for schools with a greater intake of disadvantaged children.

Criticism of provisions in the act have also come from the British Humanist Association, the Local Government Information Unit, the Liberal Democrat Education Association, teachers' unions, the Campaign for Science and Engineering, the Institute of Education and Sir Peter Newsam, former Chief Schools Adjudicator. The element of the act which eliminates the requirement for there to be local consultation was criticised as undemocratic by education lawyers and the National Governors' Association. The National Grammar Schools Association warned grammar schools against becoming academies, saying that "there are fears that academies may not be legally defined as 'maintained' schools, in which case they may lose the statutory protection of requiring a parental ballot before they are turned into comprehensive schools."

== See also ==
- Free school (England)
