= Education and Training (Welfare of Children) Act 2021 =

Act of the Parliament of the United Kingdom

Education and Training (Welfare of Children) Act 2021) (Note: Section 3(3).)
- Act of Parliament
- Parliament of the United Kingdom
- Long title: An Act to impose duties on certain education and training providers in relation to safeguarding and promoting the welfare of children.
- Citation: 2021 c. 16
- Introduced by: Mary Kelly Foy (Commons); Baroness Blower (Lords)
- Territorial extent: England and Wales (applies only to England as education is devolved in Wales) (Note: Section 3(1).)

Dates
- Royal assent: 29 April 2021
- Commencement: 29 June 2021) (Note: Section 3(2).)
Other legislation
Amends	Education Act 2002; Apprenticeships, Skills, Children and Learning Act 2009

Status: Amended

History of passage through Parliament

Text of statute as originally enacted

Revised text of statute as amended

The Education and Training (Welfare of Children) Act 2021 (c. 16) is an act of the Parliament of the United Kingdom. The act amends the Education Act 2002 and the Apprenticeships, Skills, Children and Learning Act 2009 to expand safeguarding requirements to providers of publicly funded post-16 education (namely, new "16-19 academies" and providers of T-Levels) and ensure that public funds are only provided to institutions which comply with the requirements. It closes the loophole which existed for independent education providers in relation to safeguarding law.

== Provisions ==
The provisions of the act are:

- Amending Section 175 of the Education Act 2002 to expand safeguarding duties to 16-19 academies, making the proprietor of the academy (the trust which runs it) responsible for ensuring that it has appropriate measures in place.
- Amending Section 101 of the Apprenticeships, Skills, Children and Learning Act 2009 to expand safeguarding duties to apprenticeship and T-Level training providers.
- Making it the obligation of the Secretary of State for Education to ensure that terms of agreement with these institutions require compliance with safeguarding duties.

== Timetable ==
The act was introduced in the House of Commons as a private member's bill by Mary Kelly Foy, the Labour MP for the City of Durham, in February 2020. It had its second reading on 13 March, and was passed to the committee stage by October. The bill passed its final reading in the Commons on 12 March 2021, passing to the House of Lords for its first reading the same day. It had its second reading on 19 March, and its third on 26 April. The bill became law upon gaining royal assent on 29 April 2021.

== See also ==
- Private Members' Bills in the Parliament of the United Kingdom
