= Education Act 2005 =

Act of the Parliament of the United Kingdom

Education Act 2005 (Note: Section 128(1).)
- Act of Parliament
- Parliament of the United Kingdom
- Long title: An Act to make provision about the inspection of schools, child minding, day care, nursery education and careers services; to make other provision about school education; to make provision about the training of persons who work in schools and other persons who teach, about the supply of personal information for purposes related to education and about the attendance of children at educational provision outside schools; and for connected purposes.
- Citation: 2005 c. 18
- Territorial extent: England and Wales, except that sections 108 and 109, section 124, so far as relating to those sections, and the other provisions of part 5, except sections 119 and 122 and 123, also extend to Scotland and Northern Ireland, and that any amendment or repeal made by the act has the same extent as the enactment amended or repealed. (Note: Section 127.)

Dates
- Royal assent: 7 April 2005
- Commencement: Various (Note: Section 125.)
Other legislation
Amends	Education Act 1994; Education Act 1996; Government of Wales Act 1998
Repeals/revokes	School Inspections Act 1996
Amended by	Education and Inspections Act 2006; Academies Act 2010; Charities Act 2011; Wales Act 2017; Sentencing Act 2020

Status: Amended

Text of statute as originally enacted

Revised text of statute as amended

The Education Act 2005 (c. 18) is an act of the Parliament of the United Kingdom. Introduced under the second Tony Blair government, it was enacted in order to simplify the process of school improvement, strengthening the accountability framework for schools, in particular by amending the approach used by Ofsted when inspecting schools in England. This act repealed the provisions of the School Inspections Act 1996.

== Provisions ==
The act also brought about changes to the role of the Teacher Training Agency, broadened the need for local education authorities to invite proposals for new schools, and introduced three-year budgets for maintained schools.

Section 5 states that the Chief Inspector of Schools is to inspect "to which the section applies" with intervals as may be "prescribed". When inspecting a school, the Chief Inspector has at "all reasonable times" a right of entry to the school's premises.

When an inspector deems that a school is in "significant improvement", the school must draw up an action plan in order to address the recommendations made.

=== Commencement ===
The following commencement orders have been made for this act:

- Education Act 2005 (Commencement No.1 and Savings and Transitional Provisions) Order 2005 (SI 2005/2034)
- Education Act 2005 (Commencement No. 2 and Transitional Provisions and Savings) Order 2006 (SI 2006/2129)
- Education Act 2005 (Commencement No. 1 and Transitional Provisions) (Wales) Order 2006 (SI 2006/1338)
- Education Act 2005 (Commencement No. 2) (Wales) Order 2010 (SI 2010/735)

== See also ==
- Education Act
