= Education Act 1993 =

Act of the Parliament of the United Kingdom

Education Act 1993 (Note: Section 308(1).)
- Act of Parliament
- Parliament of the United Kingdom
- Long title: An Act to amend the law about education.
- Citation: 1993 c. 35
- Territorial extent: England and Wales (Note: Section 308(4)–(5).)

Dates
- Royal assent: 27 July 1993
- Commencement: various (Note: Section 308(3).)
- Repealed: 1 November 1996

Other legislation
- Amends: Planning (Consequential Provisions) Act 1990
- Amended by: School Inspections Act 1996
- Repealed by: Education Act 1996

Status: Repealed

Text of statute as originally enacted

Revised text of statute as amended

The Education Act 1993 (c. 35) was an act of the Parliament of the United Kingdom following the publication of the Major government's education white paper Choice and Diversity: a New Framework for Schools. The act was meant to bring further diversity, accountability and autonomy for schools by expanding the amount with grant-maintained status and enabling secondaries to become specialists in non-core subjects, giving parents more choice. The act also defined special needs in education, greatly expanded the powers of the Education Secretary (in place of the LEAs') and established the School Curriculum and Assessment Authority. The act was the longest piece of educational legislation in British history until the assent of the larger Education Act 1996, which also repealed the act. The Education Act 1996 consolidated the Education Act 1993.

== Subsequent developments ==
The whole act was repealed by section 582(2) of, and part I of schedule 38 to, the Education Act 1996, which came into force on 1 November 1996.
