= List of measures of the National Assembly for Wales from 2009 =

This is a list of measures of the National Assembly for Wales passed in 2009. Measures of the National Assembly for Wales were enacted by Senedd Cymru (the Welsh Parliament; or simply the Senedd) under its former name of the National Assembly for Wales, as part of its legislative authority over devolved matters in relation to Wales under the authority of the Government of Wales Act 2006. It has no longer been possible for the Senedd to pass measures since 5 May 2011, when it was conferred with the power to pass acts of Senedd Cymru (then known as acts of the National Assembly for Wales) following a referendum. All legislation passed by the Senedd is bilingual, with the English and Welsh texts being equally authoritative. Measures are cited by calendar year, in the same fashion as acts of Parliament of the United Kingdom. Each measure passed in a respective year is numbered consecutively with Arabic numerals, following the prefix "nawm" (or, in Welsh, "mccc").

5 measures of the National Assembly for Wales were passed in 2009.

indicates that a measure is available to view at legislation.gov.uk, and indicates the location of the original measure in the National Library of Wales.

== Measures of the National Assembly for Wales ==
{{legislationuk|measure |- | {{|Learning and Skills (Wales) Measure 2009|cyshort=Mesur Dysgu a Sgiliau (Cymru) 2009|nawm|1|13-05-2009|maintained=y|url=mesur-dysgu-sgiliau-cymru-learning-and-skills-wales-measure|A Measure of the National Assembly for Wales to make provision about the entitlement to education of children in the last two years of compulsory schooling and young persons who have not attained the age of nineteen; to make provision as regards the provision by maintained schools and institutions within the further education sector of services related to education; to make provision for the disclosure of curriculum information; and for connected purposes.|cylong=Mesur gan Gynulliad Cenedlaethol Cymru i wneud darpariaeth ynglŷn â hawlogaeth plant sydd yn nwy flynedd olaf addysg orfodol a phersonau ifanc nad ydynt wedi cyrraedd pedwar ar bymtheg oed i gael addysg; i wneud darpariaeth ynghylch y gwasanaethau perthynol i addysg a ddarperir gan ysgolion a gynhelir a sefydliadau yn y sector addysg bellach; i wneud darpariaeth ar gyfer datgelu gwybodaeth am y cwricwlwm; ac at ddibenion cysylltiedig.}} |- | {{|Local Government (Wales) Measure 2009|cyshort=Mesur Llywodraeth Leol (Cymru) 2009|nawm|2|10-06-2009|maintained=y|url=mesur-llywodraeth-leol-cymru-local-government-wales-measure|A Measure of the National Assembly for Wales to make provision about arrangements by local authorities and other authorities in Wales to secure continuous improvement in the exercise of their functions; to make provision for community strategies; and for connected purposes.|cylong=Mesur gan Gynulliad Cenedlaethol Cymru i wneud darpariaeth ynglŷn â threfniadau gan awdurdodau lleol ac awdurdodau eraill yng Nghymru i sicrhau gwelliant parhaus wrth arfer eu swyddogaethau; i wneud darpariaeth ar gyfer strategaethau cymunedol; ac at ddibenion cysylltiedig.}} |- | {{|Healthy Eating in Schools (Wales) Measure 2009|cyshort=Mesur Bwyta'n Iach mewn Ysgolion (Cymru) 2009|nawm|3|15-10-2009|maintained=y|url=y-mesur-bwytan-iach-mewn-ysgolion-cymru-healthy-eating-in-schools-wales-measure|A Measure of the National Assembly for Wales to make provision about the promotion of healthy eating and drinking by pupils in maintained schools in Wales; to provide for the regulation of food and drink provided to pupils in maintained schools by the governing bodies of those schools or local authorities; and for connected purposes.|cylong=Mesur gan Gynulliad Cenedlaethol Cymru i wneud darpariaeth ynghylch hybu disgyblion mewn ysgolion a gynhelir yng Nghymru i fwyta ac yfed yn iach; i ddarparu ar gyfer rheoleiddio gan gyrff llywodraethu'r ysgolion hynny neu awdurdodau lleol fwyd a diod a ddarperir ar gyfer disgyblion mewn ysgolion a gynhelir; ac at ddibenion sy'n gysylltiedig â hynny.}} |- | {{|National Assembly for Wales Commissioner for Standards Measure 2009|cyshort=Mesur Comisiynydd Safonau Cynulliad Cenedlaethol Cymru 2009|nawm|4|09-12-2009|maintained=y|url=mesur-comisiynydd-safonau-cynulliad-cenedlaethol-cymru-national-assembly-for-wales-commissioner-for-standards-measure|A Measure of the National Assembly for Wales to establish a Commissioner to investigate complaints about the conduct of Assembly Members and to report to the Assembly on the outcome of such investigation; and for connected purposes.|cylong=Mesur gan Gynulliad Cenedlaethol Cymru i sefydlu Comisiynydd i ymchwilio i gwynion am ymddygiad Aelodau Cynulliad ac i gyflwyno adroddiadau i'r Cynulliad ar ganlyniad ymchwiliadau o'r fath; ac at ddibenion sy'n gysylltiedig â hynny.}} |- | {{|Education (Wales) Measure 2009|cyshort=Mesur Addysg (Cymru) 2009|nawm|5|09-12-2009|maintained=y|url=mesur-addysg-cymru-education-wales-measure|A Measure of the National Assembly for Wales to make provision for children to have a right of appeal in respect of special educational needs, and a right to make a claim in respect of disability discrimination in schools, to the Special Educational Needs Tribunal for Wales; to make provision for the following in relation to special educational needs and disability discrimination in schools: advice and information services, arrangements for dispute resolution other than by appeals and claims to the Special Educational Needs Tribunal for Wales, and independent advocacy services; to make provision for piloting of the provisions of Part 1 of this Measure; to make provision about the curriculum in schools in Wales; and for connected purposes.|cylong=Mesur gan Gynulliad Cenedlaethol Cymru i wneud darpariaeth i blant gael hawl i apelio mewn cysylltiad ag anghenion addysgol arbennig, a hawl i wneud hawliad mewn cysylltiad â gwahaniaethu ar sail anabledd mewn ysgolion, i Dribiwnlys Anghenion Addysgol Arbennig Cymru; i wneud darpariaeth ar gyfer y canlynol mewn perthynas ag anghenion addysgol arbennig a gwahaniaethu ar sail anabledd mewn ysgolion: gwasanaethau cynghori a rhoi gwybodaeth, trefniadau ar gyfer datrys anghydfodau ac eithrio drwy apelau a hawliadau i Dribiwnlys Anghenion Addysgol Arbennig Cymru, a gwasanaethau eirioli annibynnol; i wneud darpariaeth ar gyfer treialu darpariaethau Rhan 1 o'r Mesur hwn; i wneud darpariaeth ynghylch y cwricwlwm mewn ysgolion yng Nghymru; ac at ddibenion cysylltiedig.}} }}
