= Education (Schools) Act 1992 =

Act of the Parliament of the United Kingdom

Education (Schools) Act 1992 (Note: Section 21(1).)
- Act of Parliament
- Parliament of the United Kingdom
- Long title: An Act to make provision with respect to the inspection of schools and with respect to information about schools and their pupils.
- Citation: 1992 c. 38
- Territorial extent: England and Wales; Scotland (in part); Northern Ireland (in part); (Note: Section 21(4)–(6).)

Dates
- Royal assent: 16 March 1992
- Commencement: various (Note: Section 21(3).)
Other legislation
Amends	Education Act 1944; Education Reform Act 1988; Education (Scotland) Act 1980
Amended by	Tribunals and Inquiries Act 1992; Education Act 1996; School Inspections Act 1996

Status: Partially repealed

Text of statute as originally enacted

Revised text of statute as amended

Text of the Education (Schools) Act 1992 as in force today (including any amendments) within the United Kingdom, from legislation.gov.uk.

The Education (Schools) Act 1992 (c. 38) is an act of the Parliament of the United Kingdom which set up a system of school inspections by Her Majesty's Chief Inspector of Schools in England (now Ofsted) or the equivalent in Wales (now Estyn). The reports written by independent inspection teams and published by Ofsted are made public and the inspections are carried out according to a National Framework to ensure consistency across the country. Subsequently the legislation was brought together in the School Inspections Act 1996 that designated it to be a six-year cycle.

== Subsequent developments ==
The whole act, except sections 16, 17 and 21(5) and paragraphs 1 and 4–6 of schedule 4, was repealed by section 47(2) of, and schedule 7 to, the School Inspections Act 1996, which came into force on 1 November 1996.
