= Education Act 2002 =

Act of the Parliament of the United Kingdom

Education Act 2002 (Note: Section 217(1).)
- Act of Parliament
- Parliament of the United Kingdom
- Long title: An Act to make provision about education, training and childcare.
- Citation: 2002 c. 32
- Territorial extent: England and Wales (Note: Section 217(4).)

Dates
- Royal assent: 24 July 2002
- Commencement: Various (Note: Section 216.)
Other legislation
Amends	House of Commons Disqualification Act 1975; Further and Higher Education Act 1992; Education Act 1996; Immigration and Asylum Act 1999
Amended by	Safeguarding Vulnerable Groups Act 2006; Academies Act 2010; Criminal Justice and Courts Act 2015; Education and Training (Welfare of Children) Act 2021; Elections and Elected Bodies (Wales) Act 2024; Employment Rights Act 2025; Children's Wellbeing and Schools Act 2026

Status: Amended

Text of statute as originally enacted

Revised text of statute as amended

The Education Act 2002 (c. 32) is an act of the Parliament of the United Kingdom that gave schools greater autonomy to implement experimental teaching methods.

== Main provisions ==
The act significantly amended legislation relating to academies, publicly funded schools operating outside of local government control and with a significant degree of autonomy areas such as wages and digressing from the national curriculum. Academies were originally set up under the Learning and Skills Act 2000 under the name "city academies", and were renamed to "academies" by this act.

Schools which have innovative ideas to improve education, but are prevented by an existing law from implementing them, will be able to apply for exemption from that law.

Schools which demonstrate a high standard of teaching will be given exemption national controls such as the national curriculum, agreements on teachers' pay and conditions and the way the scheduling of the school day and terms.

Schools designating or re-designating as specialist schools could now gain specialisms in Business and Enterprise, Engineering, Mathematics and Computing and Science.

The act imposes various minimum standards for private schools in areas such as health and safety and space requirements.
