= Djanogly =

Djanogly may refer to:

- Jonathan Djanogly (born 1965), British Conservative politician
- Djanogly City Academy, school in Nottingham, England
- Harry Djanogly (born 1938), British textile manufacturer, father of Jonathan
- Sir Harry and Lady Djanogly Learning Resource Centre at the University of Nottingham
