= Peter Vardy (businessman) =

British businessman

Sir Peter Vardy
- Born: Peter Vardy; 4 March 1947 (age 79); Houghton-le-Spring, England
- Education: Chorister School, Durham; Durham School
- Occupation: Businessman

Sir Peter Vardy DL (born 4 March 1947) is an English businessman. In the Sunday Times Rich List 2009 ranking of the wealthiest people in the United Kingdom, he placed 388th with an estimated fortune of £140 million.

Vardy attended the Chorister School in Durham (1956–1961) and Durham School.

== Business interests ==
Vardy took control of the family's Ford car dealership in 1976 after the death of his father who had founded the business. He expanded the business from one dealership in the northeast of England with six staff, to a group of more than 100 dealerships with over 6,000 staff.

Following the sale of Reg Vardy plc, the Vardy Group of Companies was launched in Durham, comprising the Vardy Property Group, led by his elder son Richard, and Peter Vardy Ltd, a new motor group established in Scotland and led by his other son, Peter Vardy Jnr

== Awards and recognition ==
Vardy has been awarded several business and industry awards, as well as an honorary doctorate in Business Administration (University of Sunderland, 1995) and an honorary Doctorate of Laws (Eastern University of Philadelphia, USA, 2009). He received a knighthood for services to education in the Queen's Birthday Honours List of 2001, as well being appointed a Deputy Lieutenant of Tyne and Wear in 2002 and the Freedom of the City of Sunderland in 2011.

== Educational and philanthropic work ==
Vardy established a charity, The Vardy Foundation, in 1989, and has supported a range of education, rehabilitation and community causes in the United Kingdom and abroad. In 2015, both he and his wife, Lady Margaret Vardy, received the Beacon Award for Philanthropy for Impact and Dedication.

=== Emmanuel Schools Foundation ===
In 1989, Vardy responded to a request from the then education secretary Kenneth Baker and Prime Minister Margaret Thatcher to build one of the first City Technology Colleges, which enlisted business people to work with educationists to raise educational standards in areas where educational standards were poor. He sponsored the building of Emmanuel City Technology College in Gateshead, and subsequently under the Tony Blair initiative sponsored a further three Academies: The King's Academy in Middlesbrough (2003), Trinity Academy in Thorne, Doncaster (2005) and Bede Academy in Blyth, Northumberland which opened in September 2009. These four schools form the Emmanuel Schools Foundation, a coalition of schools with a Christian ethos based in the north of England. All of the schools have received Ofsted ratings from "good" to "outstanding". In October 2010, Vardy transferred sponsorship of the schools to the United Learning Trust, another sponsor of academies who operate over thirty schools nationwide.

=== Other charitable activities ===
Vardy began to support people, who through alcohol and drug misuse or on leaving custodial sentences, found themselves homeless. The Vardy Foundation is partnering with Betel International who operate homes in 20 countries.

The Foundation plans to support three centres in the northeast providing a home and meaningful work. The first opened in Hexham in September 2011 and a women's house was planned for opening in 2017.

He is a director of the Durham and Tees Valley Community Rehabilitation Company, which has set up a charity called ARCC, to support the Probation Service's work in the north east.

After seeing the distress caused by family breakdowns in the UK, Vardy visited Chicago in 2011 and was introduced to Dr Dave Anderson of Safe Families for Children, an established charity in the US, which has helped reduce the number of children going into state care by almost 50%. Following this, Vardy established Safe Families for Children in the UK in 2012, and by using volunteers has seen the charity develop throughout England working with 31 local authorities and seeing reductions of up to 17.5% in the first years of operation.

He is also on the Board of Trustees of the Sunderland A.F.C. charity, Foundation of Light, after being a lifelong supporter of the team.
