= Bede Academy, Blyth =

Academy in Blyth, Northumberland, England

Coordinates: 55.11695°N 1.52058°W

Bede Academy

Location
- Sixth Avenue; Blyth, Northumberland, NE24 2SY; England

Information
- Type: Academy
- Motto: Veritas vos liberabit (Latin); The Truth Shall Set You Free
- Religious affiliation: Christian
- Established: 1 Sept 2009
- Founder: Sir Peter Vardy
- Local authority: Northumberland
- Specialist: Engineering and Enterprise
- Department for Education URN: 135619 Tables
- Ofsted: Reports
- Principal of Secondary Years: S Elsworth
- Principal of Primary Years: R Burns
- Gender: Co-educational
- Age: 3 to 18
- Enrolment: 1886
- Capacity: 1780
- Website: http://www.bedeacademy.org.uk

Bede Academy is a 3–18 academy in Blyth, Northumberland, England. Opened in September 2009, it is run by the Emmanuel Schools Foundation. It was one of the first all-through academies to be set up in the United Kingdom, and the first in the North of England.

== School performance and inspection judgements ==
The school's first full inspection by Ofsted was in 2012, with a judgement of Good. There was a second full inspection in 2017, also with a judgement of Good.

In 2019, the school's Progress 8 benchmark was below average. The proportion of children entered for the English Baccalaureate was 61%, compared to 43% for the local authority overall. 36% of children at the school achieved at least grade 5 in GCSE English and maths, compared to 43% for the local authority overall. At A level in 2019, the average grade achieved by students at the school was C, and the average points score 29.62, compared to C+ and 32.59 for the local authority overall. Of students from the school who go on to university, "Many are the first in their family to attend university".

== Governance ==
The Emmanuel Schools Foundation (ESF), established by entrepreneur Sir Peter Vardy, had previously opened three other schools: Emmanuel City Technology College in Gateshead (1990), The King's Academy in Middlesbrough (2003) and Trinity Academy in Thorne, Doncaster (2005).

In October 2010, Vardy announced his retirement as sponsor of the group and its transition to the United Learning Trust. After exploring the integration of the ESF schools into the ULT, it was later announced in February 2012 that the Department for Education had agreed in principle to the four schools returning to their own independent governance, as a multi-academy trust (MAT).

Vardy had originally planned to establish seven schools, and in 2019, ESF adopted Grace College, Gateshead, and Christ's College, Sunderland, into the MAT.

== Ethos and values ==
The academy has a non-denominational Christian ethos. Originally, it promoted the seven core values of ESF, namely: honourable Purpose, humility, compassion, integrity, accountability, courage and determination. For children in the primary years, these were simplified to "Be Good", "Be Humble", "Be Kind", "Be Honest", "Be Responsible" and "Be Brave and Determined".

Bede Academy gained a School of Sanctuary Award in 2022.

In 2009 the primary section of the academy was criticised for suggesting that children might be expelled if their parents repeatedly parked on parts of the school site where parking is not allowed; a local councillor said that this was not in line with the school's Christian values.

== Facilities ==
=== Buildings ===
The academy buildings were purpose-built in 2009, designed by architects Howarth Litchfield Partnership with consulting engineers Cundall, and constructed by Surgo Construction. The "North" site housing the secondary school was built on the site of the former Ridley High School and the "South" primary school on the site of the former South Beach First School.

=== Sports ===
In addition to the sports facilities on the North and South sites, the academy also owns the land of the former Delaval Middle School site which was developed into a cricket pitch with pavilion along with a number of other sports facilities.

== Leadership ==
During the school's initial development, Nigel McQuoid, former Principal of Emmanuel College, Gateshead and subsequently ESF's Director of Schools, was the Executive Principal of Bede Academy. McQuoid left the organisation a few months before to the completion of the building and the school's opening.

From 2009 to 2010 Liz Clubbs, formerly headteacher at South Beach First School, was the founding principal of the primary years with Gwyneth Evans, who was previously a Vice-Principal at Emmanuel College, Gateshead, leading the secondary years. Gwyneth Evans then became principal with Irene Watson and subsequently Bethan Harding serving as the headteacher of the primary years site.

== Admissions ==
In 2017, the Office of the Schools Adjudicator found that the school's admission arrangements were unclear and unfair, and required the school to revise them. The school was criticised for prioritising siblings of current pupils in its admission process.

== School Life ==
=== Curriculum ===
The academy follows the National Curriculum and has academic specialists grouped into mathematics, English, science (including physics, chemistry and biology specialists), engineering, sport, modern foreign languages (French and German), history, geography, music, drama and philosophy, theology and ethics (encompassing religious, personal and social education) departments.

=== Publications ===
The academy publishes a newsletter, Bede Chronicle, once per term and an annual year book each autumn.

=== Events and performing arts ===
The academy holds events, including student concerts, as well as the Reg Vardy Band and pianist Francesco Attesti, talent shows, quizzes, cookery competitions and tea parties for local residents.

=== Sport ===
The schools of the Emmanuel Schools Foundation holds the annual ESF Olympics, in which students participate against other schools in the group.

=== Houses ===
The academy operates a house system, a key for pastoral organisation, as well as inter-school competitions and sports matches.

== In the media ==
In October 2022, the school appeared in an episode of the BBC programme We are England - Educating Blyth. The episode followed the daily life of four students at home, at school and at the workplace, as they endeavour to become the engineers of the future and contribute to Blyth’s resurgence as a modern industrial powerhouse.
