= Trinity Academy, Thorne =

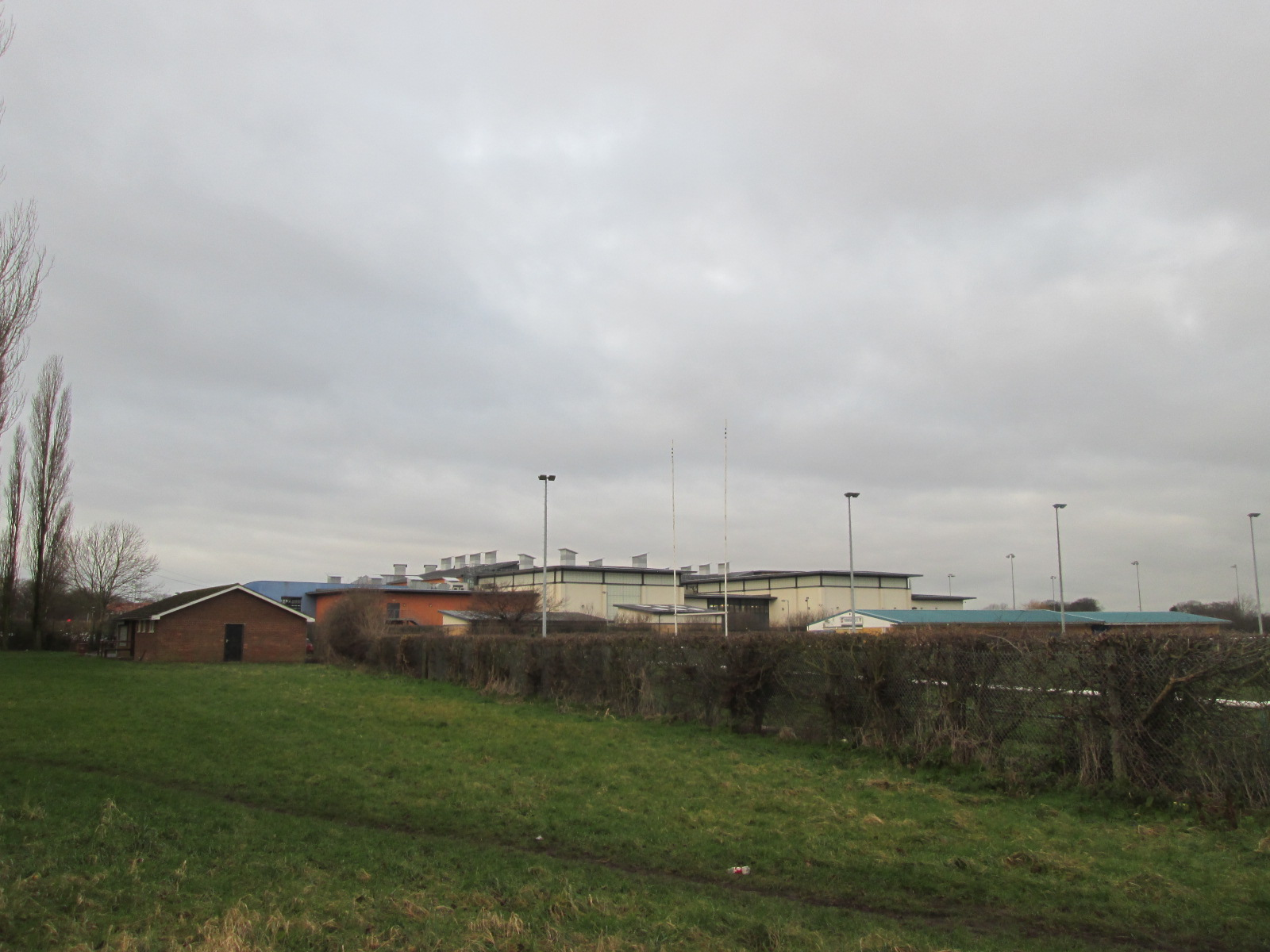
- View from the north (2015)

Location
- Church Balk; Thorne, DN8 5BY; England; 53.61275°N 0.95182°W

Information
- Type: Academy
- Religious affiliation: Christian
- Established: 2005
- Local authority: Doncaster
- Department for Education URN: 135007 Tables
- Ofsted: Reports
- Head teacher: Gibson
- Gender: Mixed
- Age: 11 to 18
- Enrolment: 1225
- Colour: burgundy
- Website: http://www.trinity-academy.org.uk/

Trinity Academy is a non-selective co-educational secondary school in the English Academy programme, at Thorne near Doncaster, South Yorkshire, England.

It is a member of the Emmanuel Schools Foundation, established by entrepreneur Sir Peter Vardy to educate pupils within a Christian ethos.

== History ==
The school opened in September 2005 and replaced Thorne Grammar School, established in 1930, which became a comprehensive school in 1973. The majority of the Grammar School's building was demolished, but its war memorial plaque and window were moved to the new Academy building and re-dedicated. The main, Georgian style frontage of the school was subsequently converted into apartments in 2009, with new mews style houses built on the former grass tennis courts along the frontage facing Church Balk.

The school has received rewards from the Specialist schools and Academies trust for being the 'Most Improved Academy in England & Wales' in 2008 and 'Most Improved Academy in Yorkshire & Humberside' in the years 2008, 2009 and 2010. The school was deemed 'Outstanding' by Ofsted in March 2011. However, in December 2013 Ofsted placed the school in 'special measures.' As of 2015, the school is no longer in 'special measures.'

== Notable alumni ==
=== Thorne Grammar School ===
- Peter Davies (politician), Mayor of Doncaster from 2009 to 2013, and father of Conservative rebel MP Philip Davies
- Lesley Garrett, opera singer and Principal Soprano from 1984 to 1998 with the English National Opera
- Leslie Hodson, physicist from Fishlake who discovered the kaon (K+ meson) sub-atomic particle in 1954 and did important work with cloud chambers
- Jill Morrell, author, campaigner, motivational speaker, and Head of Public Affairs with the British Lung Foundation
- George Porter, Baron Porter of Luddenham, awarded the Nobel Prize in Chemistry in 1967, knighted in 1972, President from 1985 to 1990 of the Royal Society, and Chancellor from 1986 to 1995 of the University of Leicester
- E. A. Smith (historian)

=== Trinity Academy ===
- Connor Swift, cyclist.

== Other Emmanuel Schools ==
School	Location
Emmanuel College	(England) Gateshead
The King's Academy	(England) Middlesbrough
Bede Academy	(England) Blyth
Grace College	(England) Gateshead
Christ's College	(England) Sunderland

== See also ==
- List of schools in Doncaster
