= Sean Tomes =

English rugby union player

- Born: Sean Tomes; 19 July 1984 (age 42) Gateshead, Tyne and Wear, England
- Height: 6 ft 7 in (2.01 m)
- Weight: 19 st 1 lb (121 kg)
- School: Emmanuel College
- Notable relative: Alan Tomes

Rugby union career
- Position: Lock
Youth career
- Gateshead Fell RFC
Senior career
Years	Team	Apps	(Points)
2006	Otley		
2007	Doncaster Knights		
2006-2009	Newcastle Falcons	3	(5)
- Newport Gwent Dragons
2009	Exeter Chiefs		

Sean Tomes born in Gateshead, England is a rugby union player. A lock, he is the son of 48 cap Scotland international and British and Irish Lions tourist Alan Tomes.

Sean Tomes made his Guinness Premiership debut during the 2007-08 Guinness Premiership coming on as a substitute for the Newcastle Falcons against London Wasps. He was initially loaned out to Doncaster Knights for the 2007-08 season but returned around Christmas time after fellow lock Jason Oakes was forced to retire due to injury.

Tomes joined the Newport Gwent Dragons in March 2009 on a short-term deal until the end of the 2009 season and made 3 appearances for the Welsh regional team. At the end of the 2008-09 Magners League Sean joined the Exeter Chiefs to help with their promotion efforts.

Before Exeter's final for promotion to the premiership it was announced that he was to sign for Bedford Blues citing the need for more game time.

After 2 years and 36 appearances with the Blues, it was announced that Tomes was on trial with Newcastle Falcons.
