= John Cabot Academy =

Location
- Woodside Road; Kingswood, South Gloucestershire, BS15 8BD; England; 51.4574°N 2.5151°W

Information
- Type: Academy
- Motto: Learners Inspiring Learning
- Established: 1993
- Trust: Cabot Learning Federation
- Department for Education URN: 135295 Tables
- Ofsted: Reports
- Principal: Kate Willis
- Executive mPrincipal: Sir David Carter
- Gender: Mixed
- Age: 11 to 19
- Enrolment: 998
- Capacity: 875
- Houses: Banksy, Naz and Aardman
- Colours: Yellow, Blue and green
- Website: https://johncabotacademy.clf.uk/

John Cabot Academy (formerly John Cabot CTC) is one of 15 City Technology Colleges that first opened for students in the 1993/1994 academic year. It has since converted to Academy status on 1 September 2007. It is located in east Greater Bristol, England in the Kingswood area of South Gloucestershire and is named after John Cabot, an explorer who set out from Bristol and reached the Americas in 1497. The academy has 1,078 students, about 220 of whom are in the sixth form.

== History ==
The John Cabot City Technology College (CTC) became the John Cabot Academy in 2007. The present Academy is independent of local authority control, but enjoys a close relationship with both South Gloucestershire and Bristol Local Authorities.

The school served as the filming location for the TV show Skins from 2007 to 2013, where it was depicted as the fictional Roundview College.

== Information ==
The principal is Kate Willis. The academy is part of an Academy Federation led by Sir David Carter, a previous Principal, who was knighted in the 2013 Birthday Honours List. The federation runs lessons throughout the several schools, with sixth formers moving between schools for some of their lessons.

The academy operates the PLTs Curriculum, which was developed at the academy. It focuses on inspiration and teaches students to empower over students to achieve greater feats together The academy is divided into 6 tutor groups throughout each year (3 in x and 3 in y).

== Term system and school day ==
From the start of the academic year 2009/10 the term system has been changed to be the same as other schools in England to make the Diplomas easier to coordinate. This turned out to be unpopular due to demand for public places and therefore became over crowded.

The typical school day begins at 8:40AM and ends at 3:00PM. The time is divided into 6 periods (not including tutor time and break times).

== Student Voice ==
The academy has a student voice system which allows the students to give their opinions on issues related to the academy, such as sanctions and rewards, and the construction of new buildings. Two students from each tutor group are chosen each year. The chosen student becomes the representative of their tutor group, collecting opinions from their classmates to relay to the meeting.

== Notable Former Pupils ==
Ellis Genge, rugby union player
