= Emmanuel Schools Foundation =

British educational charity running academy schools, set up in 1989

The Emmanuel Schools Foundation (ESF) is a charitable trust which has been involved in education since 1989.

ESF currently run six schools. The four original members of the ESF are: Emmanuel City Technology College in Gateshead (opened 1990), The King's Academy in Middlesbrough (2003), Trinity Academy in Thorne, Doncaster (2005) and Bede Academy in Blyth, Northumberland which opened in September 2009. In 2004, the Foundation's former chairman, Sir Peter Vardy, discussed an aim to sponsor seven schools in the North of England that would educate a total of 10,000 students. In April 2019, the ESF also formally adopted Joseph Swan Academy in Gateshead into the foundation. Most recently, the foundation adopted Christ's College Sunderland (formerly 'Grindon Hall Christian School') in Sunderland into ESF.

Many of its schools have been oversubscribed every year.

Although the Government allows academies to select 10% of pupils by ability, ESF Academies do not do so, being fully comprehensive schools for local children. They have a Christian ethos, but are not faith schools and welcome staff and students of all faiths and of none.

== History ==
=== Establishment of Emmanuel College ===
In 1988, Sir Peter Vardy responded to the then Government’s appeal to local businessmen to become involved in the education of young people in the most socio-economically deprived parts of their home regions through sponsorship of the City Technology College initiative. The aim of the initiative was twofold:

1. To engage business people who had been successful in turning around failing businesses in using their experience to help turn around failing schools, and
2. To create beacons of academic excellence in inner-city areas which would be able to show other parents, teachers and students what was possible.

The first ESF school, Emmanuel City Technology College, was founded in 1990 as Tyneside’s City Technology College and opened with just 151 students in Year 7. John Burn (Headteacher of Long Benton) had been instrumental in persuading Peter Vardy to engage in the CTC programme. Originally specialising in Technology, the College was awarded a second specialism in Business and Enterprise (2005), allowing it to build upon its Beacon School and current Leading Edge Status through its extensive work in delivering specialist teaching programmes within Primary Schools.

=== Expansion ===
The foundation was formally established when The King's Academy was established in Coulby Newham, Middlesbrough in 2003, as one of the earliest schools built under New Labour's academies programme. Vardy pledged to eventually build seven academies.

The Foundation's approach was not universally welcomed, and in 2004 opponents blocked the Foundation's bid to take over Northcliffe School in Conisbrough, near Doncaster, which Ofsted had placed under special measures. Instead, it took over Thorne Grammar School and redeveloped the site to create Trinity Academy in 2005.

In September 2009 ESF opened its fourth school, Bede Academy, its first covering the whole school age range of 3-18, with nursery, primary and secondary provision across two sites in Blyth, Northumberland.

=== New oversight and developments ===
In October 2010 it was announced that Vardy was handing over management of the schools to the United Learning Trust. The ESF schools were never integrated into the ULT network, however, and were ultimately later established as a multi-academy trust (MAT).

In April 2019, ESF formally adopted Joseph Swan Academy in Gateshead, after it was rated inadequate in a 2018 Ofsted inspection, with Emmanuel College vice-principal Mark Hall taking over leadership of the school. Later in 2019, Christ's College Sunderland in Sunderland was also brought into the multi-academy trust, with Bede Academy's vice-principal Julie Roberts becoming its head.

== Academic successes ==
Emmanuel College claims that its students, taught as part of a mixed, non-selective comprehensive school, perform significantly above all value-add measures and their academic results have placed the College amongst the highest ranked schools in England for the past ten years.

A 2009 report on The King's Academy by Ofsted referred to many improvements, with the school officially ranked as "good, with many outstanding features". Inspectors said the academy was exceptional when it came to boosting students' personal development and well-being, and offering them care, guidance and support.

== Controversy ==
In 2002, a group of leading scientists including Richard Dawkins alleged that creationism was taught in biology classes at Emmanuel College. Steven Layfield, the College's Head of Science and a Young Earth creationism activist, had held a lecture urging teachers to promote creationism to pupils, parents, and colleagues, including in science classes. Layfield later resigned from the board of creationist body Truth in Science to state a separation between his private views and the school's teaching of science.

After reviewing the material used to teach science at Emmanuel College, Mike Tomlinson, chief inspector of Ofsted, decided that the matter did not need to be pursued further. The next Ofsted inspection in 2006 described the school as 'Outstanding' and found no problem with its science provision.

In 2005, John Harris in The Guardian accused Emmanuel Schools Foundation of promoting fundamentalist Christianity. In 2006, Rod Liddle interviewed ex-pupils for a Channel 4 Dispatches programme titled "The New Fundamentalists", alleging that their teachers had promoted creationism both in and out of class.

However, a later article by Martin Wainwright, writing in The Guardian in December 2006, said that associating ESF's schools with creationism "couldn't be more wrong." Wainwright wrote of Vardy that "he says: 'Look, I don't believe any nonsense about the world being created in six days.' He leans against his big car with its personalised number and rolls his eyes at the fact that the head of science at the Emmanuel Academy in Gateshead got involved in circulating an "intelligent design" pack last year".

Opponents of academies continued to refer to the original accusation. After Tribune magazine published such an article in 2009, Peter Vardy took legal action against the magazine and its editor, who apologised, withdrew the allegations, and made an undisclosed payment to a nominated charity.
