= Jason Oakes =

Jason Oakes may refer to:

- Jason Oakes (cricketer) (born 1995), South African cricketer
- Jason Oakes (rugby union) (born 1977), English rugby player
