= Landau Forte College =

Landau Forte College Derby

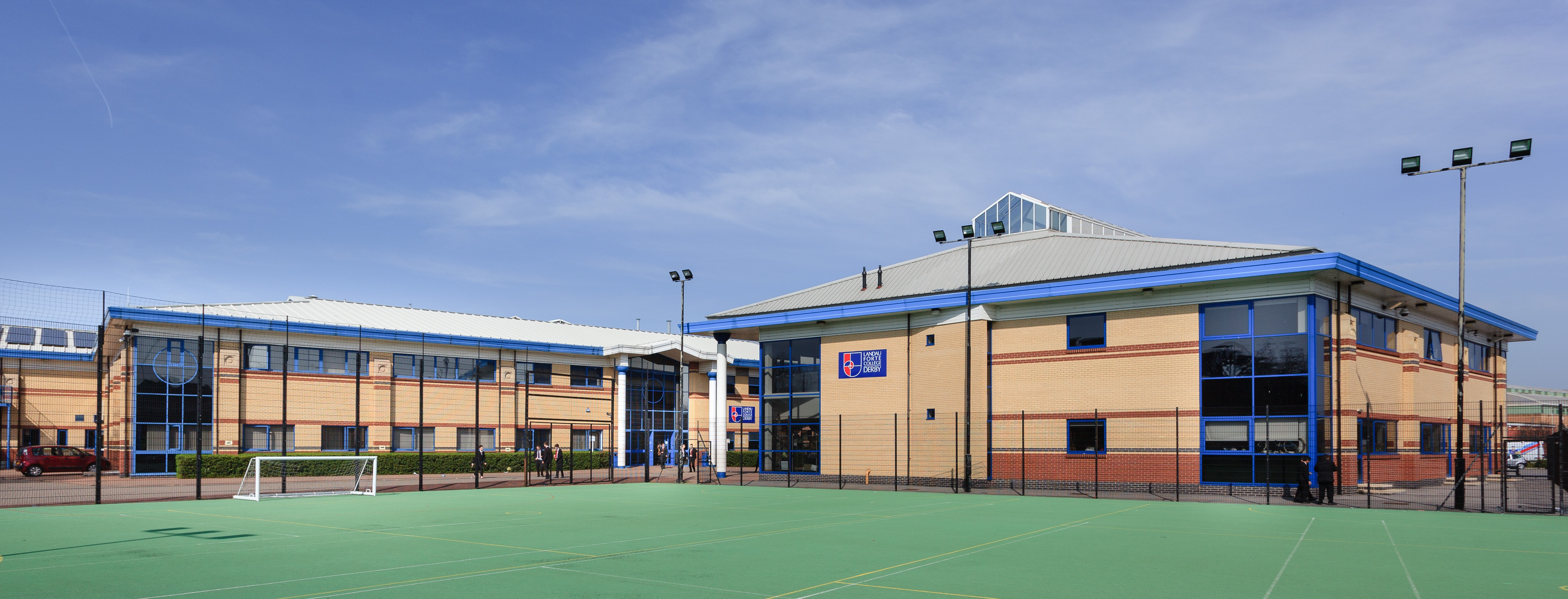

Location
- Fox Street; Derby, Derbyshire, DE1 2LF; England; 52°55′38″N 1°28′23″W

Information
- Type: Academy
- Established: 1992 as a CTC; 2006 as an Academy
- Founders: Martin Landau/Sir Rocco Forte
- Department for Education URN: 135120 Tables
- Ofsted: Reports
- Assistant Principals: D Bloomfield / A Delbridge / A Hitchin / L Percival
- Principal: Alison Brannick
- Vice Principals: L Rowe / M Andrews
- Gender: Coeducational
- Age: 11 to 19
- Enrolment: 1200
- Houses: Liberty, Opportunity, Versatility, Equality, Diversity
- Colours: Blue, red, black and white
- Publication: Newslink
- Website: https://landau-forte.org.uk/

Landau Forte College Derby is an academy in Derby, England. As a secondary school and sixth form, it serves students aged 11–19 from the City of Derby and surrounding areas.

== Ofsted ==
In May 2012, Landau Forte College Derby received an 'Outstanding' rating from Ofsted in all four areas of the inspection, a rating that the school had maintained since, most recently in 2024. In their report, inspectors stated that "attainment is high across the college" and that "students have outstanding attitudes to learning".

== Academics ==
The College is one of the top performing schools in Derby, with an above average Progress 8 score of +0.37 in 2017.

In January 2018, the College was featured in an article in The Derby Telegraph after it was ranked as one of the top three academically achieving schools in Derby following the release of their Progress 8 and Attainment 8 results. High prior attainers achieved a Progress 8 score of +0.52 while the Progress 8 score for disadvantaged pupils was also above average at +0.27.

Landau Forte College Derby has a high achieving Sixth Form offering A Levels and vocational courses, as well as a range of enrichment opportunities and university access support.

In 2017, the Sixth Form topped the Derby league tables for Progress 8.

== Initial Teacher Training Programme ==
Landau Forte College Derby operates a school-centred initial training (SCITT) programme, which gives staff the opportunity to train to teach whilst gaining in-class experience.

In its first inspection in 2017, the College's SCITT Partnership was judged as 'Good' by Ofsted.

== Landau Forte Teaching School Alliance ==
Landau Forte College Derby, a National Teaching school, is the lead school for the Landau Forte Teaching School Alliance.
