= The King's Academy, Middlesbrough =

Academy school in Middlesbrough, North Yorkshire, England

The King's Academy

Location
- Stainton Way; Coulby Newham; Middlesbrough, North Yorkshire, TS8 0GA; England; 54.5238°N 1.2228°W

Information
- Type: Academy
- Religious affiliation: Christian
- Established: September 2003
- Local authority: Middlesbrough
- Department for Education URN: 134223 Tables
- Ofsted: Reports
- Principal: Simon Reader
- Age: 11 to 18
- Enrolment: 1,197
- Website: https://www.thekingsacademy.org.uk/

The King's Academy is an 11–19 secondary school and academy located in Coulby Newham in the Middlesbrough unitary authority, England, serving the community of South Middlesbrough. Established in 2003, it is run by the Emmanuel Schools Foundation established by entrepreneur Sir Peter Vardy. It was officially opened by Prime Minister Tony Blair in March 2004.

It was built to replace the former Local Authority-run Brackenhoe and Coulby Newham secondary schools and Beverley School for the Deaf, accepting its first students from educational years 7 to 11 on 8 September 2003 and first opening its sixth form a year later. It has capacity for 1,250 students and promotes a specialism in Business and Enterprise. It is wholly funded by the Department for Education and operates the same intake policy as that in place across all other Local Authority-maintained schools in Middlesbrough. It reserves 10% of its intake for children with Statements of Special Educational Needs, specifically for those with hearing and visual impairment and those with moderate learning difficulties.

== Academic achievement ==
In the academy's first Ofsted report in 2005 it was described as "a good school with many strong features". In its second Ofsted report in 2009 it was described as "a good school with many outstanding features". Ofsted report gradings in 2009 were "Outstanding" for Care, Guidance and Support and for Personal Development and Well-being and "Good" in all other areas.

In its first nine years of operation, the academy increased its GCSE pass rate (5 A–C) from 34% in 2004 to 89% in 2012 In 2007, 2008, 2010 and 2011 it was given a Contextual Value Added (CVA) score that placed it in the top 10% of all schools nationally for the progress its students make between the start of Year 7 and the end of Year 11. In January 2009, The Guardian newspaper ranked The King's Academy amongst the top 50 most improved secondary schools in the country. The academy runs a sixth form, where examination results have improved consistently over the last four years.

Even before it opened, opponents of City Academies and of the Emmanuel Schools Foundation, including the British scientist and atheist Richard Dawkins, claimed that the academy would teach creationism in science lessons; this allegation was published in the national press and repeated for a few years. However, the school consistently denied teaching creationism. Finally, in 2006, The Guardian visited the school and published a strongly supportive article, emphasising that associating the school with creationism "couldn't be more wrong."

== Curriculum ==
At Key Stage 3 students study English, mathematics, science, business studies, ICT and enterprise, French or German, history, geography, religious education, engineering or resistant materials, food technology, art & design, music, drama and physical education.

At Key Stage 4 all of the above subjects may be studied through an options system, plus English literature, double or triple science, economics, graphic products, textiles, electronics, business communications, health & social care and travel & tourism.

At Key Stage 5, Advanced Levels are offered in English language, English literature, mathematics & mechanics, mathematics & statistics, further mathematics, biology, chemistry, physics, applied science, French, German, applied business, applied ICT, economics, history, geography, psychology, religious education, product design, food technology, art, textiles, theatre studies, music and physical education. BTECs are offered in business, sport, ICT and health & social care.

== Music and drama ==
Students participate in a wide range of music and drama events throughout the year, including showcase events such as the performing arts festival, summer music evening and annual prize giving ceremony. The academy hosts the Associated Board of the Royal Schools of Music High Scorers' Concert in October each year. The King's Academy's Gospel Choir won the "Boro's Got Talent" Competition at the Riverside Stadium in 2008.

== Major sports ==
Major sports throughout the autumn and spring terms are boys' football and rugby and girls' hockey and netball. Boys' basketball is also played. Major sports in the summer term are athletics, boys' cricket and girls' rounders. Tennis is also played.

== Activities and events ==
Major annual events in the academy calendar include the Performing Arts Festival, Staff vs Dads' Soccer Match, Christmas Carol Service, Senior Citizens' Party, Fashion Show, Careers Fair, Principal's Race Night, ESF Olympics, School Production, ESF Business Game, Year 8 Residential Week at Stainsacre, Year 9 Paris Trip, Year 6 Transition Week, Art & Textiles Exhibition, Tall Ships Challenge, Year 11 Principal's Dinner, Year 13 Leavers' Dinner, Sports Day, Sports Review Dinner and Prizegiving. Recent school trips abroad have included Paris, Barcelona, Berlin, Rome, skiing in the French and Italian Alps, charitable work in South Africa and a football tour of Texas, USA.

The academy runs a comprehensive programme of House competitions throughout the year, where all four Houses compete against one another in each of the following disciplines: cross country, table tennis, boys' football, girls' football, boys' rugby, girls' hockey, boys' basketball, girls' netball, boys' cricket, girls' rounders, athletics, swimming, fishing, poetry, art, maths, short story writing, general knowledge, performing arts, chess, photography, cookery, merits and House boards.

The King's has recently established a partnership and exchange programme with No.2 Middle School in Cangzhou, Hebei Province, China.

== Facilities ==
The academy was purpose-built in 2003, designed by architects Howarth Litchfield Partnership and consulting engineers Cundall, and constructed by Surgo Construction. Its accommodation comprises over 80 classrooms, 12 seminar rooms, a main hall (seating 500) and lecture theatre (seating 269), a large sports hall (lined out for basketball, tennis, badminton, five-a-side football and with indoor cricket nets), a dance studio and fitness suite, school library, sixth form study centre and common room, drama studio and music recording studio, two restaurants, a full size floodlit astroturf pitch (lined out for hockey and football), a large hard court multi-use games area (lined out for netball and tennis) and extensive playing fields (lined out for football and rugby in the autumn and spring terms and for athletics and cricket in the summer term).

The school was the first to have closed-circuit television cameras installed in all classrooms. The Head reported in the school's first year that CCTV had already proved valuable in protecting a teacher against false allegations.

== Other Emmanuel Schools ==
| School | Location |
|---|---|
| Emmanuel College | (England) Gateshead |
| Trinity Academy | (England) Doncaster |
| Bede Academy | (England) Blyth |
| Grace College | (England) Gateshead |
| Christ's College | (England) Sunderland |

=== Partner School ===
| School | Location |
|---|---|
| Cangzhou No.2 Middle School | (China) Cangzhou |
