= Grace College, Gateshead =

Grace College

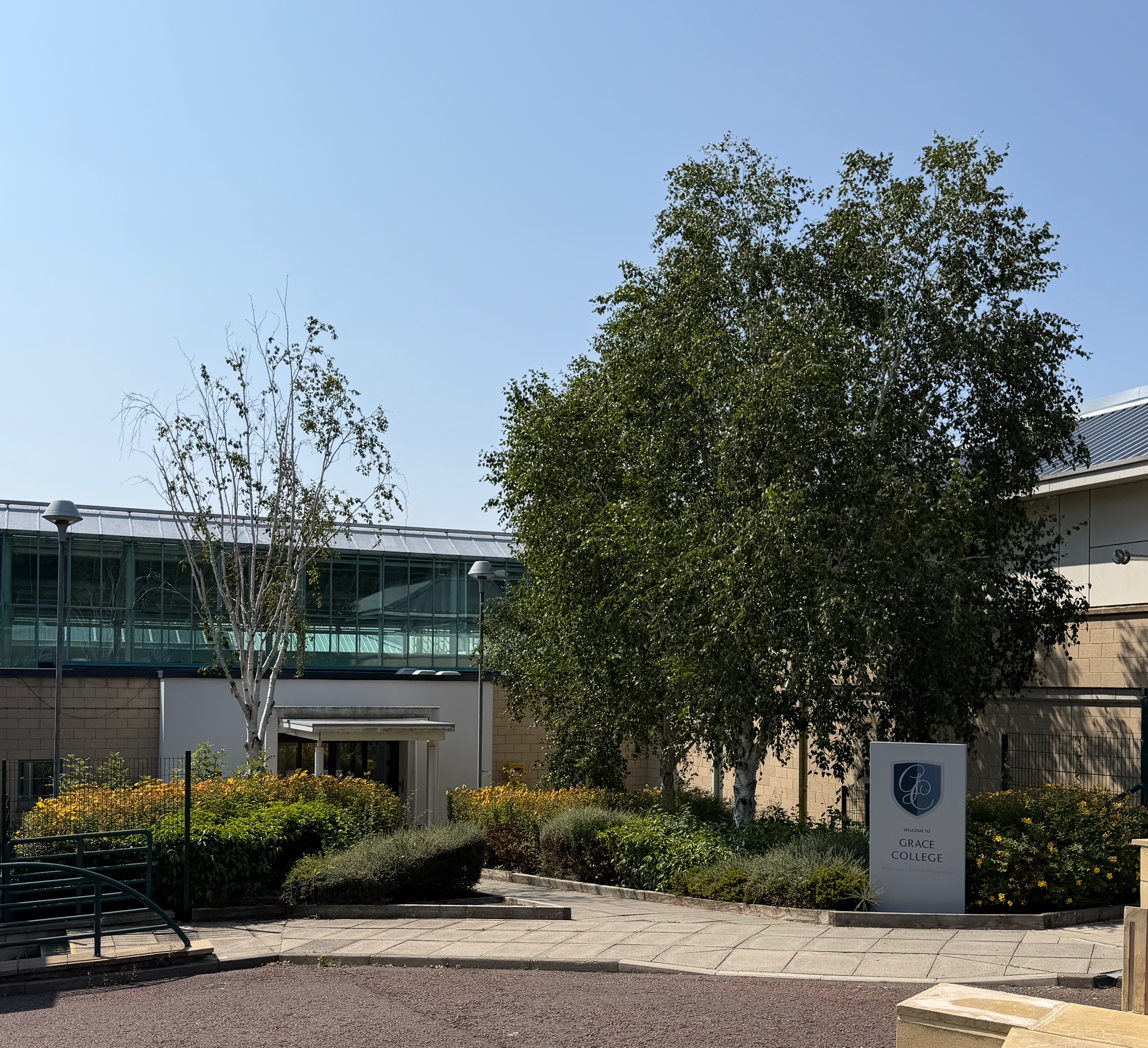
- The Grace College visitor reception entrance on 15 July 2026.

Location
- Saltwell Road South, Low Fell; North East England; Gateshead, Tyne and Wear, NE9 6LE; England; 54°55′40″N 1°36′23″W

Information
- Type: Academy converter
- Religious affiliation: None
- Established: 1 April 2019
- Local authority: Gateshead
- Trust: Emmanuel Schools Foundation
- Department for Education URN: 147178 Tables
- Ofsted: Reports
- Chair of Governors: Mr Tom Smyth (appointed 11 March 2026)
- Principal: Mrs Rachael Hooker
- Years taught: Years 7–13
- Gender: Mixed
- Age range: 11–18
- Enrollment: 1,125 (as of 14 July 2026)
- Capacity: 1,432 (as of 14 July 2026)
- Houses: Butler, Cookson, Stephenson, Swan
- Website: https://www.gracecollege.org.uk
- Last updated: 9 August 2026

Grace College (formerly Joseph Swan Academy) is an academy converter with a sixth form located in Gateshead, England. The school is part of the Emmanuel Schools Foundation (ESF).

Grace College provides joint sixth form provision with Emmanuel College (another school within ESF) under the Emmanuel and Grace College Associated Sixth Form. The sixth form, referred to as the "associated sixth form" by Ofsted, is taught from and based at Emmanuel College.

The Emmanuel and Grace College Associated Sixth Form logo (dark variant).

The Emmanuel and Grace College Associated Sixth Form logo (light variant).

The Emmanuel and Grace College Associated Sixth Form logo (dark variant).

== Former schools on the same site ==
=== Breckenbeds Junior High School and Heathfield Senior High School ===
Breckenbeds Junior High School and Heathfield Senior High School were community schools on the same site: the former taught pupils aged 11–14 and the latter taught pupils aged 14–18.

Both of the schools closed on 1 September 1996.

=== Joseph Swan School ===
Joseph Swan School was a community school with a sixth form, formed on 1 September 1996 as the successor of Breckenbeds Junior High School and Heathfield Senior High School.

The school closed on 29 February 2012.

=== Joseph Swan Academy ===
Joseph Swan Academy was an academy converter with a sixth form, formed on 1 March 2012 as the successor of Joseph Swan School.

On 17 April 2018, the school received a section 5 inspection under the Education Act 2005 by Ofsted and was given an overall effectiveness grade of "Inadequate". As a result, the school closed on 31 March 2019 and was transferred to ESF.

The school reopened as Grace College on 1 April 2019.

== Flood events ==
=== Joseph Swan Academy ===
On 28 June 2012, the former school (Joseph Swan Academy) experienced flood damage, including damage to twenty-five classrooms and a kitchen. As a result, work took place to clean and refurbish the school, during which another flood occurred in August that same year. On 18 August 2012, in a statement made to Chronicle Live, the then principal Mr Allan Fuller stated that the school now had a refurbished gym and regenerated science and technology classrooms. Plans to build flood walls and floodwater storage facilities were made.

=== Grace College ===
In September 2023, the school (Grace College) sustained flood damage to approximately 70% of the site after a month's worth of rain fell in less than an hour, with floodwater entering the ground floor and damaging classrooms, corridors, break areas, reception areas, the sports hall, and the assembly hall. CCTV footage released by the school showed water rapidly flowing down a bank and into the building.

The school closed on 11 September 2023 after it was determined the site was unsafe. More than 1,200 pupils were moved to remote learning while the damage was being assessed. In statements to the BBC and Chronicle Live, the then lead principal Mr Matthew Waterfield described the situation as "very challenging", with his "thoughts [being] in particular" with Year 7 pupils who had only begun secondary school the previous week.

Support staff temporarily relocated to Emmanuel College (another school in Gateshead within the Emmanuel Schools Foundation (ESF)) while senior leaders and professional recovery specialists were brought into Grace College to assess the damage. Mr Waterfield stated that while some face-to-face teaching could resume two weeks after the flooding, full restoration of the site could take several months.

Parents reported difficulties managing the sudden return to home teaching, with some describing the situation as "awful" and difficult to manage long-term. Despite this, Mr Waterfield praised students for their engagement with remote learning during the school closure.

Other Gateshead schools were also affected by the flooding, including Larkspur Primary School and Dryden School, both of which were partially closed due to flood damage.

== Controversies ==
=== Uniform policy dispute ===
In September 2023, the school received media attention after several pupils were disciplined or sent home on the first day of the academic year for wearing footwear that did not comply with the school's uniform policy.

According to the BBC, a mother claimed her 11-year-old daughter was "treated like an animal" and was placed in isolation on her first day of secondary school for wearing Vivienne Westwood designer court shoes. Chronicle Live reported the same mother describing her daughter as being "treated like a dog". The mother also claimed her daughter was made to sit on the hard sports hall floor for four hours with several other pupils, with the pupil not being allowed to have a drink or take her blazer off. Chronicle Live additionally reported that according to the mother, the pupil was "forced to wait until last for lunch" and "forced to write out rules".

According to Chronicle Live, a father claimed his 15-year-old daughter was "left with blisters" after she was told to wear school shoes that were "too small" for her. He claimed the school offered her a pair of size-seven brogue shoes or the option of being sent home, despite the pupil explaining she was a size eight. According to the father, the daughter chose to wear the smaller shoes to avoid being sent home, and experienced blisters on both feet.

Interviewed by the BBC, Chronicle Live, and the Daily Mirror, parents criticised the school's approach as being overly strict and disruptive to pupils' education. Some parents argued the uniform policy placed undue pressure on families during a period of rising living costs, while others argued that the school's disciplinary approach resembled an "army camp" or "prison camp". One parent argued the school's requirement for brogue shoes was impractical for pupils who walked to school, especially in wet weather.

Some people praised the school for its uniform policy, with one stating that the policy "prevent[s] some better off parents buying designer [...] footwear for their children, [becoming] a competition on who has the most expensive shoes".

Grace College's uniform policy stated that students were required to wear "plain, sensible black shoes", with the top of the foot fully covered for "safety reasons". In a statement for the BBC, the school said it was applying its policy consistently and emphasised that students were given opportunities to correct uniform issues, including access to "new" or "nearly new" items kept on site. The school added it did not comment on individual cases and aimed to ensure all pupils felt "welcome, safe and free from any pressures".

== Notable alumni ==
=== Joseph Swan School ===
- Andy Carroll, footballer
- Scott Fenwick, footballer

=== Joseph Swan Academy ===
- Hayden Coulson, footballer

== Other schools within the Emmanuel Schools Foundation ==
School	Location
Emmanuel College	(England) Gateshead
The King's Academy	(England) Middlesbrough
Trinity Academy	(England) Doncaster
Bede Academy	(England) Blyth
Christ's College	(England) Sunderland
