= Christ's College, Sunderland =

Christ's College Sunderland

Location
- Pennywell Road; Sunderland, Tyne and Wear, SR4 8PG; United Kingdom
- 54.89593°N 1.43655°W

Information
- Former name: Grindon Hall Chritian School
- Type: Free school
- Motto: Per Pietatem ad Gaudium
- Religious affiliation: Christian
- Established: 1988; 2000 (current school)
- Founder: Elizabeth Gray
- Local authority: Sunderland
- Department for Education URN: 138567 Tables
- Head teacher: Julie Normanton
- Key people: Vice Principle- Ian Tully
- Gender: Coeducational
- Age: 4 to 16
- Enrolment: 300; 540 (2013/14)
- Classrooms: 46 Accessible by students
- Houses: Benedict Hilda Oswald
- Colours: Red, Grey & Black
- Publication: Probo
- Website: www.christscollege.org.uk

Christ's College (formerly "Grindon Hall Christian School") is a free school located in Sunderland, in the North East of England. It is non-selective and includes a Primary Department and a Secondary Department. This arrangement allows the incorporation of students from 4 years old to 16 years old. It is a family-run school, based on Christianity, although it welcomes children from other faiths. There are approximately 540 children in the school as of 2013/14. Grindon Hall was originally a manor house. It became a sanitorium and later Fulwell Grange Christian School, which became Grindon Hall Christian School in the year 2000.

Fulwell Grange Christian School was founded by Elizabeth Gray in 1988. Her son, Christopher Gray, became head teacher following her retirement. She has since become a school governor.

Previously a private school, Grindon Hall became a free school in 2012 and is now state-funded and free to attend.

In September 2019, the school was renamed as part of its transition to join the Emmanuel Schools Foundation

== Buildings and grounds ==
The school comprises a number of different buildings. One is the original Grindon Hall building, and this is used for the Secondary Department. An extension was added in 2001–2002, called the T-Block, which housed changing facilities and two classrooms. The Grade II listed Stable Block was converted in order to be used as the Primary Department, along with 2 modular buildings. The Nursery Department is one modular building.

There is a front field which incorporates a rugby pitch, and in addition to this, there is a back yard, for use in wet weather and before school. The size of the estate is approximately 9 acres (36,000 m^{2}).

Since becoming a free school, Grindon Hall has undergone various changes to its buildings which were completed for the 2013–14 school year. The aforementioned T-Block has been demolished, and in its place an extension, comprising a sports hall, changing facilities and dining hall. The extension also includes a 14-classroom primary school, replacing the Stable Block as the Primary Department. The Stable Block is now used as additional classrooms for the Secondary Department. The new Cabins are For the Secondary Department alongside another modular building used for DT(design and technology)

== Academics ==
Grindon Hall used to host an annual Awards Evening at The Sage Gateshead where pupils from both lower- and upper-school were recognised for achievement in various areas of school life. Since around 2016 this has been held in the school sports hall.

== House system ==
Pupils are assigned to one of the school's two (now three, as of 2017) house teams when they join the school. Pupils can gather points for their house team throughout the year by performing well academically, participating in organised house events, and from collecting praise points from teachers.

== Notable former pupils ==
- Sammy Ameobi, football player
- Shola Ameobi, football player
- Aaron J. French, musician

== Other Emmanuel Schools ==
School	Location
Emmanuel College	Gateshead
The King's Academy	Middlesbrough
Trinity Academy	Doncaster
Bede Academy	Blyth
Grace College	Gateshead
