= Leslie Hodson =

British physicist

Leslie Hodson (born Fishlake 15 July 1925 – died Leeds 1 March 2010) was an English physicist who discovered the kaon (K+ meson) sub-atomic particle in 1954.

Hodson was educated at Thorne Grammar School and the University of Manchester. After three years as a research associate at Princeton he became a lecturer at the University of Leeds. He retired in 1990.
