= Emmanuel College, Gateshead =

Emmanuel College

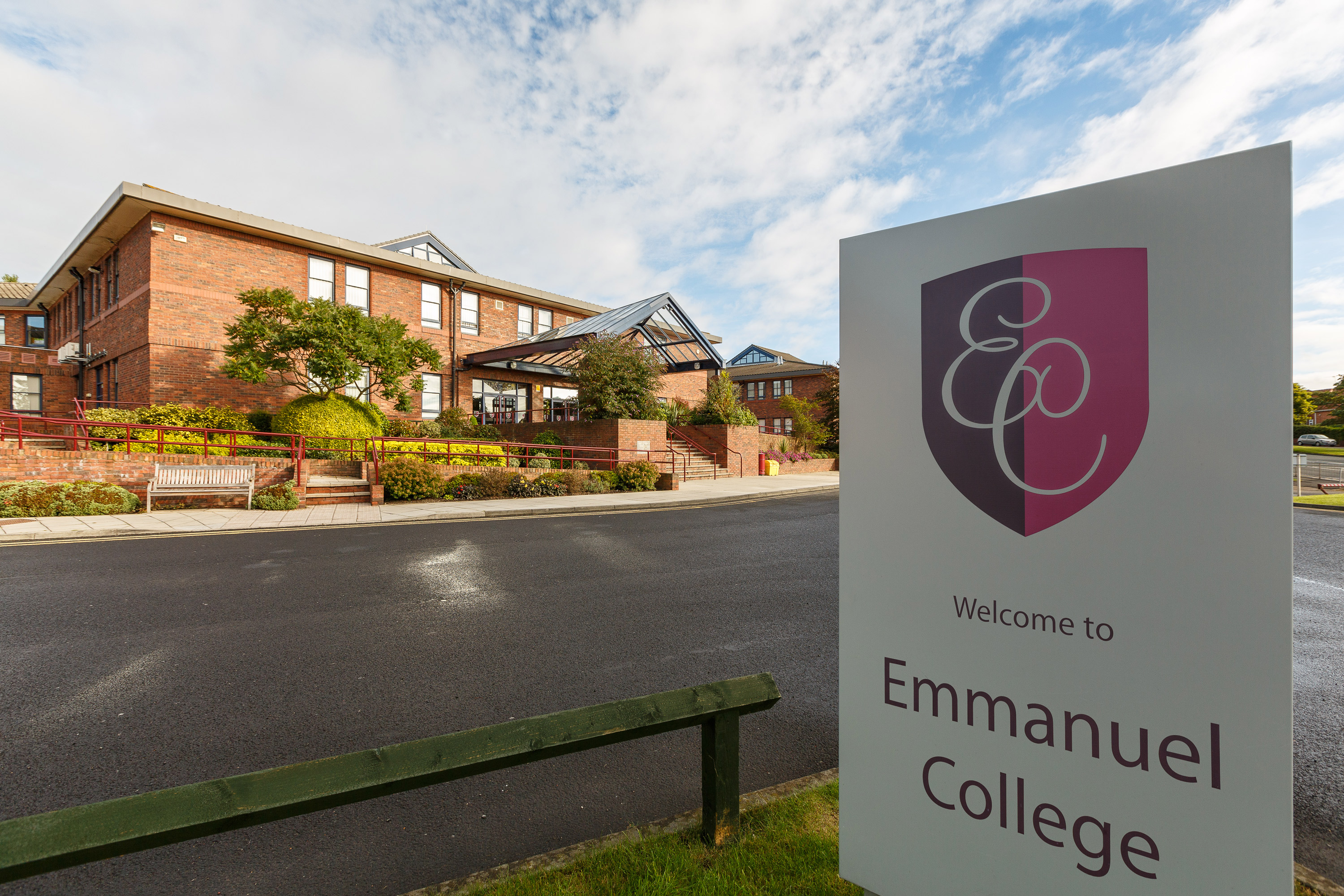
- The Emmanuel College building in 2013.

Location
- Consett Road, Lobley Hill; North East England; Gateshead, Tyne and Wear, NE11 0AN; England; 54.938°N 1.642°W

Information
- Type: City technology college
- Religious affiliation: None
- Established: 1990
- Founders: Sir Peter Vardy; John Burn OBE; Baron Bates
- Local authority: Gateshead
- Trust: Emmanuel Schools Foundation
- Department for Education URN: 108420 Tables
- Ofsted: Reports
- Chairman: Mr Ross Smith (appointed 11 October 2017)
- Principal: Mr Nathanael Ogborn (appointed 13 February 2026)
- Years taught: Years 7–13
- Gender: Mixed
- Age range: 11–18
- Enrolment: 1,564 (as of 6 October 2026)
- Capacity: 1,450 (as of 6 October 2026)
- Houses: Galatians, Romans, Corinthians (1990–2021); Derwent, Don, Pandon, Team (since 2021)
- Website: https://www.emmanuelcollege.org.uk
- Last updated: 10 October 2026

Emmanuel College is a city technology college with a sixth form located in Gateshead, England. The school is part of the Emmanuel Schools Foundation (ESF).

Emmanuel College hosts the Emmanuel and Grace College Associated Sixth Form, providing joint sixth form provision with Grace College (another school within ESF). The sixth form, referred to as the "associated sixth form" by Ofsted, is taught from and based at Emmanuel College.

The Emmanuel and Grace College Associated Sixth Form logo (dark variant).

The Emmanuel and Grace College Associated Sixth Form logo (light variant).

The Emmanuel and Grace College Associated Sixth Form logo (dark variant).

== Ofsted inspections ==
Between 28 March 2006 and 22 May 2013, the school received three section 5 inspections under the Education Act 2005 by Ofsted. For each of those three inspections, the school received an overall effectiveness grade of "Outstanding".

On 15 October 2024, the school received a section 5 inspection under the Education Act 2005 by Ofsted and was graded "Outstanding" in all categories.

In 2002, the school was described by The Guardian as achieving "consistently outstanding academic results", having received a "glowing Ofsted report [in 2001]".

== Admissions policy 2027–2028 ==
=== Admission into Year 7 ===
The published admission number for Year 7 entry is 240 pupils.

The school non-selectively admits pupils. To facilitate this, all applicants entering Year 7 are invited to sit a non-verbal reasoning test provided by GL Assessment, with the results used from the test to place each applicant into one of nine ability "bands". The ability bands range from highest to lowest ability. The number of places for each band is determined by the national spread of abilities; more places are available in the middle bands compared to the highest and lowest ability bands.

=== Admission into Year 12 (Sixth Form) ===
Existing Year 11 pupils from Emmanuel College and Grace College who wish to continue their education at the "associated sixth form" will transfer into Year 12 if they meet the entry requirements for their chosen courses.

The published admission number for external applicants entering Year 12 is 20 pupils. Once places for internal and external applicants have been allocated, more external candidates may be admitted until capacity is reached.

== Controversies ==
=== Creationism ===
In 2002, the school was at the centre of protests from scientists and educationalists when it was revealed that some members of the management team, including both the principal and the head of science, were sympathetic to Young Earth creationism. The school had allowed its hall to be rented by Answers in Genesis, an organisation which promotes such views. The school includes evolutionary science in its curriculum, but presents evolution as a theory complemented by the theory of creationism (taught in religious education lessons). This led to allegations by Richard Dawkins, John Polkinghorne, and others that the school taught creationism in science lessons. The Liberal Democrat MP Jenny Tonge asked Prime Minister Tony Blair if he was "happy to allow the teaching of creationism alongside Darwin's theory of evolution in state schools". Blair replied that he supported a "diverse school system", and praised the teachers at Emmanuel College for their commitments to "deliver[ing] better results for our children".

After re-inspecting the material used to teach science at Emmanuel College, Ofsted decided that the matter did not need to be pursued further. The next Ofsted inspection in 2006 described the school as "Outstanding" and found no problem with its science provision.

Some allegations centred on the school's former head of science, Steven Layfield, who had, prior to his taking up the post, publicly advocated the teaching of Intelligent Design in schools in 2000.

=== Gross misconduct allegation ===
In the academic year 2013–2014, former teacher of history Mr Daniel McQuoid (son of former principal Mr Nigel McQuoid) engaged in gross misconduct with an 18-year-old student who had left the school; as a result, he resigned in 2014. It was subsequently investigated by both the police and the National College for Teaching and Leadership, which found that there was no evidence of matters serious enough for either police prosecution or for him having any limitations on his ability to teach again.

=== Authoritarian ethos ===
In 2003, former teacher of music Cormack O'Duffy painted a negative picture of the school during a discussion with TES journalist Michael Shaw. O'Duffy was discharged of his position for disobeying an order from the then principal Nigel McQuoid for vocally voicing his concerns about the school. However, O'Duffy's union provided legal support and the case against him was dropped. During the interview, O'Duffy described the school as a place of "eerie silence" and an institution of immense regulation: "With its quiet atmosphere, you might easily think you had entered the set of a James Bond movie where all the workers at the plant are focused on a task and have no time for frivolity." Furthermore, O'Duffy raised concerns about the nature of the Christian ethos claiming an over-emphasis on hell.

== Notable alumni ==
- Michelle Heaton, pop singer, former member of Liberty X
- Jay Gardner, reality TV star formerly of Geordie Shore
- Onyi Nwabineli, novelist
- Jonny Rowell, professional footballer who has played in the Belgian Pro League
- Benjamin Satterley (1986-2026), professional wrestler who was signed to All Elite Wrestling and previously with WWE
- Sean Tomes, former Rugby Union player for Newcastle Falcons
- Chrissy Rouse (1995-2022), British Superbike racer

== Other schools within the Emmanuel Schools Foundation ==
School	Location
The King's Academy	(England) Middlesbrough
Trinity Academy	(England) Doncaster
Bede Academy	(England) Blyth
Grace College	(England) Gateshead
Christ's College	(England) Sunderland
