= Sir Harry and Lady Djanogly Learning Resource Centre =

Coordinates: 52.9536°N 1.1885°W

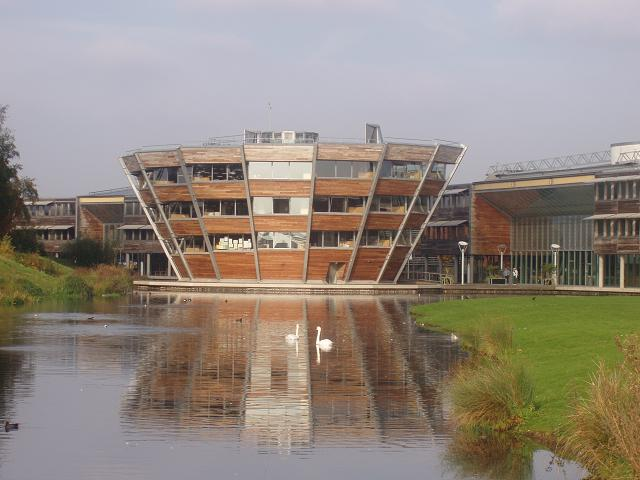
Djanogly Learning Resource Centre, Jubilee Campus

The Sir Harry and Lady Djanogly Learning Resource Centre (or the Djanogly LRC) is a library on the Jubilee Campus of the University of Nottingham, England. The library was constructed as part of program to develop the disused Raleigh Bicycle Company factory into the Jubilee Campus. The library was one of seven principle buildings constructed on the site and was formally opened by Elizabeth II on 9 December 1999. The library was named after the philanthropists Sir Harry and Lady Djanogly who gave a significant contribution towards the cost of its construction.

It is possible for students to book a work space and meeting rooms in the library via an online platform.

The library houses books and resources relating to courses and research in the university's Faculty of Education and School of Computing Science, and also houses the Commonwealth Education Documentation Centre. Since the summer of 2009 the library has also held all adult education course books previously kept at the Shakespeare Street library in Nottingham city centre after it was closed down as part of a money saving plan.

== Architecture ==
The library is an unusual circular building situated on an island platform in the middle of the campus lake. It was designed by the architect Sir Michael Hopkins, with the striking feature of having only a single floor, which spirals its way up and around the circumference of the building. The floor plate makes three and a half revolutions and gets wider as it rises up the building, resulting in the inverted cone-shape of the building. The structure comprises 16 radial steel frames with a vertical column on the inside end of the frame.

In 2020 a freedom of information request was filed with the University of Nottingham following rumours that the library was sinking. The university responded that no building on the campus was sinking. The university said:

Whilst Djanogly library is surrounded by water, the building was erected first, and the lake then constructed around it, not the other way round- as is the case for many of the other buildings on Jubilee Campus. None of these buildings are sinking.

— Catherine Allin on behalf of University of Nottingham, Br-Freedom-Of-Information, University of Nottingham, https://www.whatdotheyknow.com/request/djanogly_library_sinking

== See also ==
- Djanogly City Academy
- Solomon R. Guggenheim Museum
