= City Technology College =

Type of secondary school in England

City Technology Colleges logo

In England, a City Technology College (CTC) is an urban all-ability specialist school for students aged 11 to 18 specialising in science, technology and mathematics. They charge no fees and are independent of local authority control, being overseen directly by the Department for Education. One fifth of the capital costs are met by private business sponsors, who also own or lease the buildings. The rest of the capital costs, and all running costs, are met by the Department.

== Description ==
CTCs operate as limited companies with articles of association and a board of governors. A CTC is governed through an operating agreement made between the Secretary of State for Education and whoever is responsible for establishing and running the school. This agreement includes the regulations for the school's educational provision (e.g. its curriculum and admissions policy). These are negotiated between the two parties and must be enforced by the school should it wish to receive government funding from the Secretary of State. This funding covers most capital costs and all running costs, although one fifth of capital costs are instead met by private business sponsors, who also own or lease the buildings. More government funding is granted to be spent towards the school's pupils. This funding fluctuates on a per capita basis and depends on the size of the total pupil population.

CTCs teach the National Curriculum, but specialise in mainly technology-based subjects such as technology, science and mathematics. Like maintained schools, they are regularly inspected by the Office for Standards in Education. CTCs also forge close links with businesses and industry (mainly through their sponsors), and often their governors are directors of local or national businesses that are supporting or have supported the colleges. The programme has been successful in the long term with all the CTCs being considered strong establishments with consistently high academic results.

== Development ==
Plans to establish schools or colleges for technology in major urban areas were first reported in an article from The Sunday Times in December 1985. There would be between sixteen and twenty of these institutions serving 1000 pupils each. They would charge no fees and would be publicly funded through an educational trust, but would select their pupils on a "special" basis. Unlike other state-funded schools at this time, these institutions would not be run by their local education authority (LEA or simply local authority). These plans were the brainchild of Schools Minister Bob Dunn, who had been pushing the Secretary of State for Education and Science Keith Joseph to introduce British magnet schools, with the ultimate aim of encouraging specialisation and increased parental choice in the education system. These schools, if introduced, would be known as technology-plus schools, specialist schools for technology with extra funding from private sector sponsors.

In January 1986, a Centre for Policy Studies meeting was held in the House of Lords. The meeting was organised by Cyril Taylor and focused on the growing issue of unemployment amongst the youth. Among the attendees were Prime Minister Margaret Thatcher, Secretary of State for Employment David Young, who chaired the meeting, and sixty other business leaders and politicians, twenty of whom were invited by Taylor. The twenty business leaders explained to Thatcher that the cause of youth unemployment was schools teaching the wrong skills to their pupils. They recommended, with Taylor, the creation of a hundred secondary schools similar to Bob Dunn's proposed technology-plus schools to deal with this issue. They would be urban inner city specialist schools for technological and technical education, funded by the central government via direct grant legislation and independent of local authority control, instead being partially controlled by private sector sponsors investing into them. Taylor thought that these schools could meet the growing demands for business qualifications in the workforce and also proposed a new provision for teacher training in these schools to combat the ongoing teacher shortage at the time.

A new Secretary of State for Education and Science, Kenneth Baker, was appointed on 21 May 1986. An advocate of technical education and technology in general, Baker was drawn towards the concept of schools for information technology, having formed this interest during his tenure as the Minister for Industry and Information Technology in the early 1980s. Computers were a rarity in schools at the time, so Baker set up an initiative to introduce a computer to every school in the country. Now in his position as Education Secretary, Baker wished to further improve digital learning and computing in the education system, and wanted to introduce schools for computing and information technology as a way to do so. In addition, schools for general technology were expected to give pupils the correct skills for employment, which supported the recommendations made some months prior by Cyril Taylor and his business leaders.

The policy for the schools proposed in January's meeting, dubbed City Technology Colleges or simply CTCs, was developed in the five months following Baker's appointment. This was influenced from talks surrounding other proposed technical schools, namely the technology-plus schools proposed by Bob Dunn, which occurred at the same time. Like CTCs, Dunn's technology-plus schools would be inner city specialist schools for technology with independence from their local authorities with some involvement from industry sponsors. Baker and Dunn worked together to develop the CTC policy, with the help of six other main individuals. They were Chris Patten, Cyril Taylor, George Walden, Virginia Bottomley, Alistair Burt and Tony Kerpel, all of whom served as ministers or advisers to Baker and his predecessor at the Department for Education and Science, Keith Joseph. The schools' independence from local authority control attracted Prime Minister Margaret Thatcher and her policy adviser Brian Griffiths, both of whom wanted local authorities phased out of the education system. Thatcher supported the policy on these grounds, alongside the belief that it would improve education and give schools increased autonomy from their local authorities.

== Implementation ==
Finally, Baker announced the City Technology Colleges programme at the 1986 Conservative Party Conference, which had a goal of creating a national network of new CTCs that would boost educational diversity and parental choice in the school system, while also improving educational standards in their local areas. As expected, around twenty of these new schools were planned for creation in urban inner cities next to secondary schools already in operation, and all of them would have total independence from their LEA. They would serve pupils aged from eleven to eighteen, selecting them based on their "attitudes" towards a technological education. Despite this, the schools would not use an eleven-plus exam as was customary in other selective schools, and would be classified as comprehensive schools. They would specialise in science, technology and mathematics and have a strong provision for information technology and vocational education.

The first CTCs opened under the terms of the Education Reform Act 1988 in the late 1980s and early 1990s. The first City Technology College opened was The City Technology College, Kingshurst in 1988, which was later converted to an academy in 2008. The original intention was to improve education inside cities, but the programme was hampered by the refusal of local authorities in the targeted areas to provide suitable school sites. Building entirely new schools was much more expensive, requiring a greater contribution from the government, and the resulting schools tended to be on the outskirts of cities. After the programme was abandoned, the government embarked on the more modest aim of designating some existing schools as Technology Colleges, the first non-CTC specialist schools.

The Learning and Skills Act 2000 introduced a similar type of school, the City Academy, later renamed Academy. Differences from CTCs include halving the financial commitment of the sponsor, and being bound by the Schools Admissions Code. The Labour government encouraged CTCs to convert into academies.

== List of CTCs ==
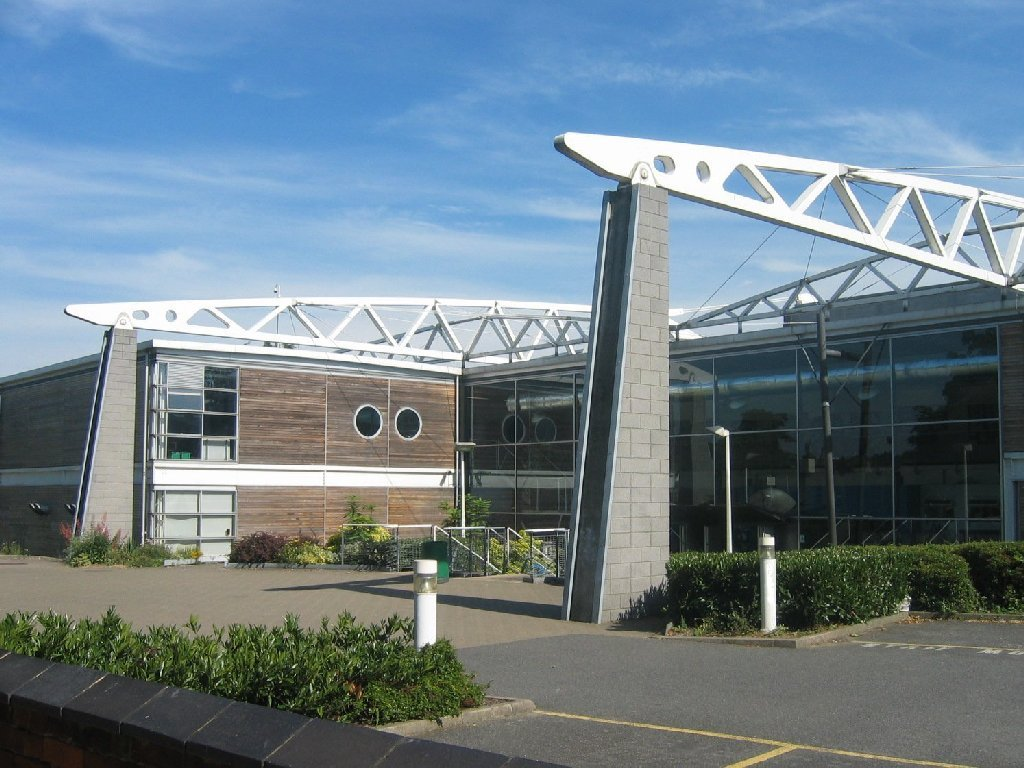
The BRIT School for Performing Arts and Technology in Croydon, London

=== Established ===
In all, 15 City Technology Colleges were created, of which all but three have converted to academies:

School	Local Authority	Primary Sponsor	Opened as a CTC	Converted to Academy
ADT College	Wandsworth	ADT Limited	1992	2007
Bacon's College	Southwark	Southwark Diocesan Board of Education, Philip and Pauline Harris Charitable Trust	1991	2007
BRIT School	Croydon	British Record Industry Trust	1991	no
Brooke Weston College	North Northamptonshire	Hugh de Capell Brooke, Garry Weston	1991	2008
Dixons Bradford CTC	Bradford	Dixons Group plc	1990	2005
Djanogly CTC	Nottingham	Harry Djanogly	1989	2003
Emmanuel CTC	Gateshead	Reg Vardy Foundation	1990	no
Haberdashers' Aske's Hatcham College	Lewisham	The Haberdasher's Company	1991	2005
Harris CTC	Croydon	Philip and Pauline Harris Charitable Trust	1990	2008
John Cabot CTC	South Gloucestershire	Wolfson Foundation, Cable & Wireless plc	1993	2007
The City Technology College, Kingshurst	Solihull	Hanson Industries	1988	2008
Landau Forte College	Derby	Landau Foundation, Forte plc	1992	2006
Leigh CTC	Kent	Sir Geoffrey N. Leigh	1990	2007
Macmillan CTC	Middlesbrough	British American Tobacco	1989	2006
Thomas Telford School	Telford and Wrekin	The Mercers' Company, Tarmac plc	1991	no

=== Proposed ===
Although there were only 15 City Technology Colleges by the end of the programme, there were a number of additional proposed CTCs that never opened:

School/site awaiting conversion	Local authority	Primary sponsor
Stretford Grammar School	Manchester	Biwater
Thames Wharf	London Docklands	Cable & Wireless plc, London Docklands Development Corporation
De La Salle College of Higher Education	Manchester	Pentland Industries, British Aerospace
Allan Glen's School, Our Lady and St Francis' All-girls Secondary School	Glasgow	Trusthouse Forte
None, new school would be built	Swindon	W H Smith
No site decided	Coventry	Jaguar and Wates
King Richard School	Portsmouth	No sponsor decided
No site decided	No area decided	Paul Hamlyn
Richard Taunton School	Southampton	Beebe Chamber of Commerce
Merchant Venturers School	Bristol	Merchant Venturers, Bristol Polytechnic
No site decided	Leeds	Asda, Vickers

== See also ==
- Academy (English school)
- State-funded schools (England)
- University Technical College
