= Djanogly City Academy =

Djanogly City Academy Nottingham
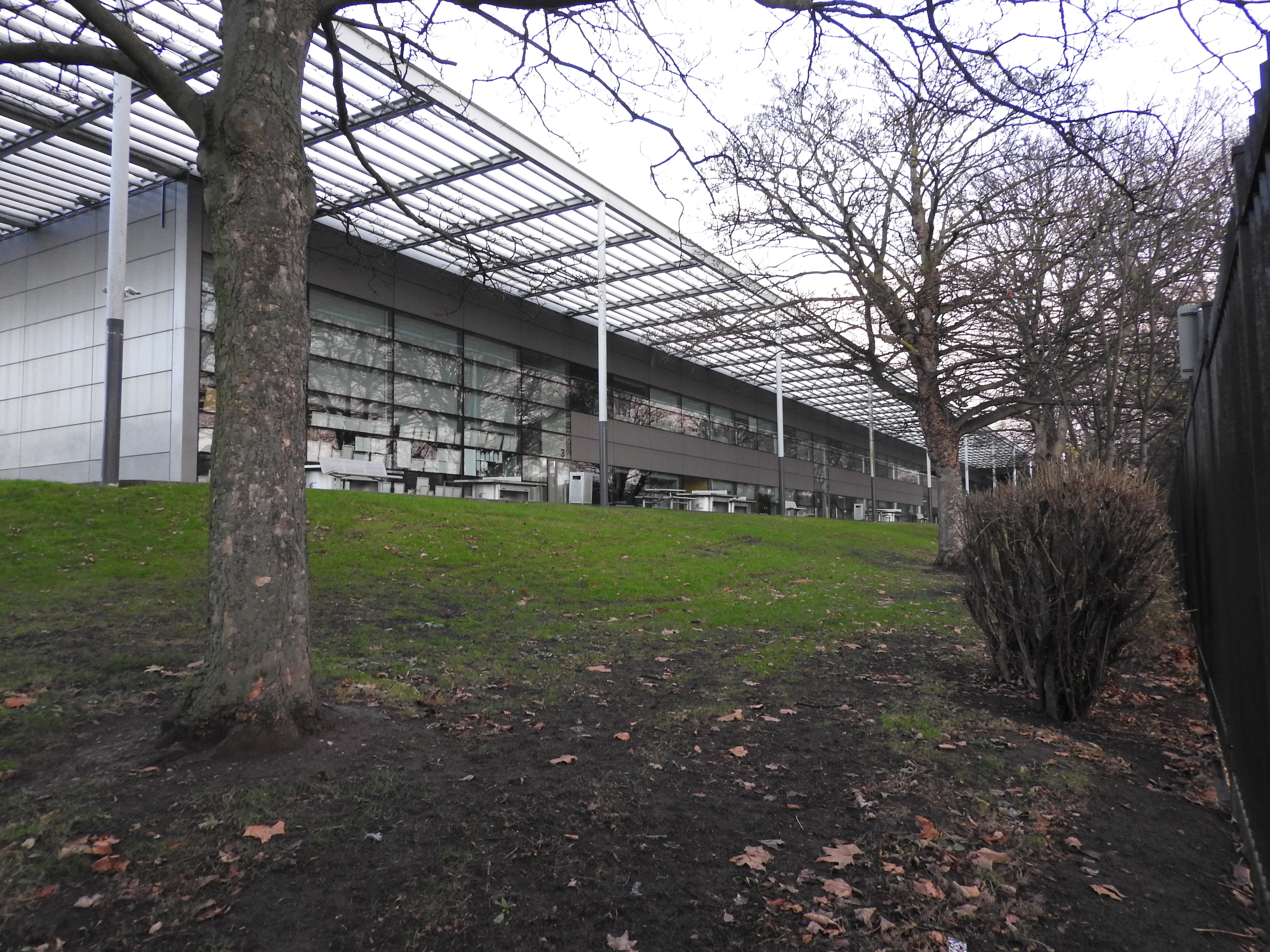

Location
- Gregory Boulevard; Nottingham, Nottinghamshire, NG7 6NB; England; 52°58′01″N 1°09′50″W

Information
- Type: Academy
- Established: 1989 as Djanogly City Technology College, 2003 Gained Academy status
- Local authority: Nottingham
- Trust: Djanogly Learning Trust
- Department for Education URN: 134253 Tables
- Ofsted: Reports
- Chair: Sir Harry and Lady Djanogly
- Head teacher: Andy Smith
- Gender: Coeducational
- Age: 11 to 19
- Website: http://www.djanogly.notts.sch.uk/

Djanogly City Academy City Academy secondary school in Nottingham, England. It has been open since 2003, when it replaced the oversubscribed Djanogly CTC, a City Technology College, which was then independent from local authority control. The academy specialises in the use of ICT and has been awarded the ICT Mark.

It is named after its sponsor, textile millionaire Sir Harry Djanogly.

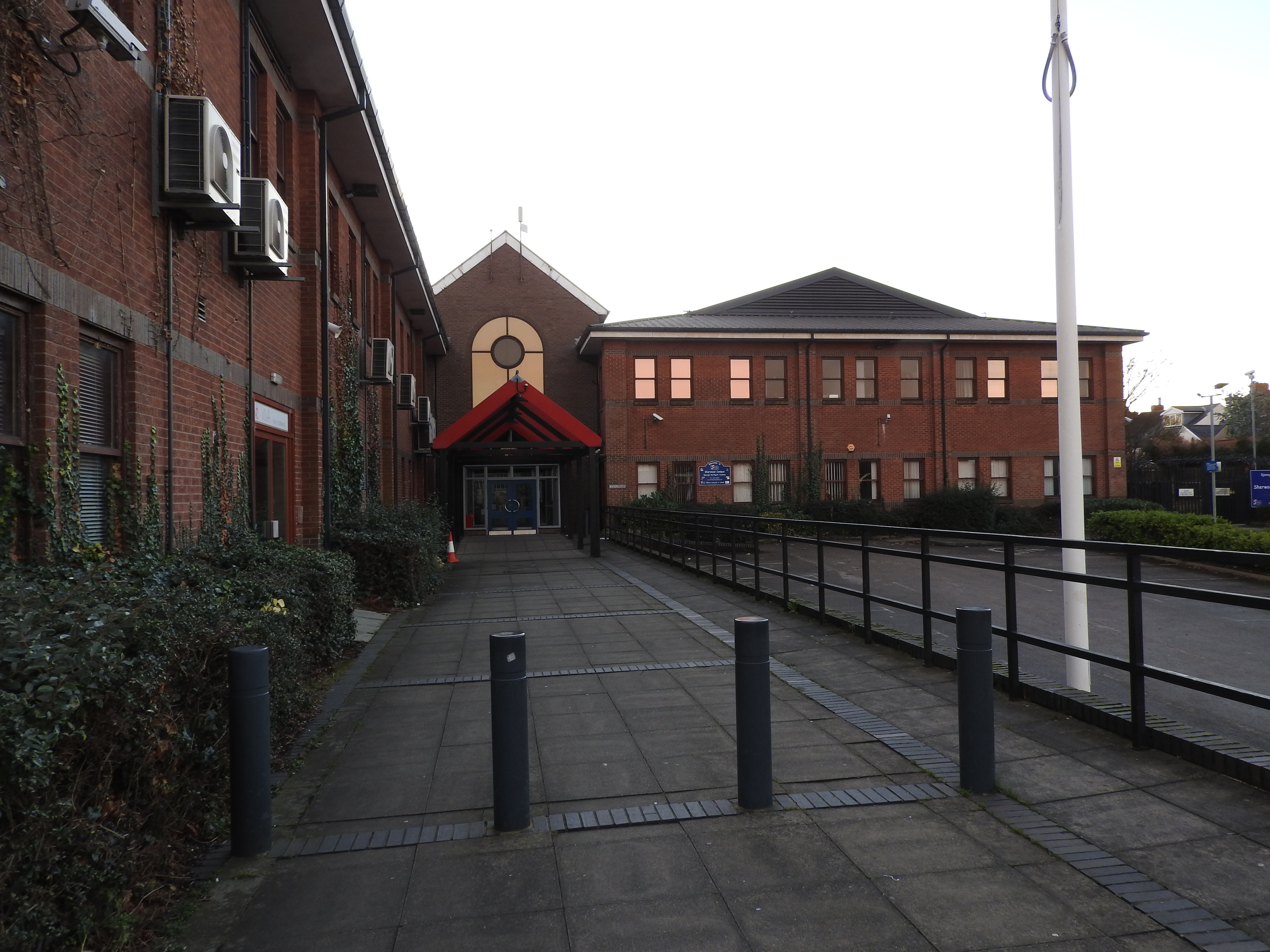
Djanogly City Academy – Sherwood Rise Campus

Djanogly formerly operated on two sites – the 14–19 Centre in the old CTC building in Sherwood Rise, and the 11–14 Centre in a new building designed by Foster & Partners on the site of the former Forest Comprehensive School on Gregory Boulevard, opposite the Forest Recreation Ground. The Sherwood Rise site now accommodates the primary aged children. However, towards the end of the school year, year 11 students are accommodated here to study and take their GCSE examinations.

== See also ==
- Sir Harry and Lady Djanogly Learning Resource Centre at University of Nottingham
