= Jonathan Djanogly =

British Conservative politician

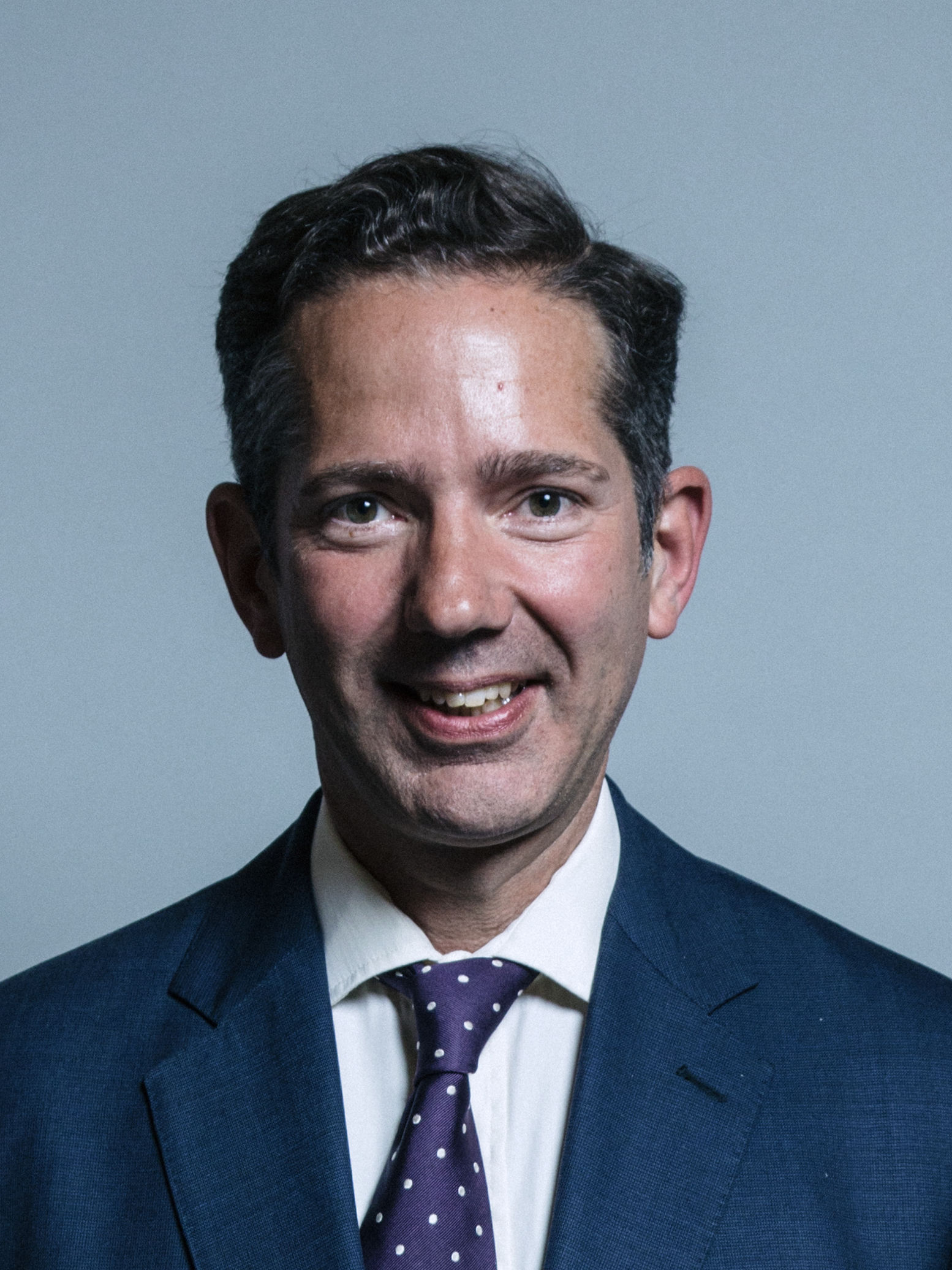
- Official portrait, 2017

Parliamentary Under-Secretary of State for Courts and Legal Aid
- In office 11 May 2010 – 4 September 2012
- Prime Minister: David Cameron
- Preceded by: The Lord Bach
- Succeeded by: Helen Grant

Shadow Solicitor General for England and Wales
- In office May 2004 – 6 May 2010
- Leader: Michael Howard; David Cameron
- Preceded by: Nick Hawkins
- Succeeded by: Maria Eagle

Member of Parliament for Huntingdon
- In office 7 June 2001 – 30 May 2024
- Preceded by: John Major
- Succeeded by: Ben Obese-Jecty

Member of Westminster City Council for Regent's Park
- In office 1994–2001

Personal details
- Born: Jonathan Simon Djanogly; 3 June 1965 (age 61) Hammersmith, England
- Party: Conservative
- Spouse: Rebecca Silk (m. 1991)
- Children: 2
- Education: Oxford Polytechnic (BA)
- Profession: Solicitor
- Website: Official website

Jonathan Simon Djanogly (born 3 June 1965) is a British politician and solicitor who served as Shadow Solicitor General for England and Wales from 2004 to 2010 and Parliamentary Under-Secretary of State for Courts and Legal Aid from 2010 to 2012. A member of the Conservative Party, he was Member of Parliament (MP) for Huntingdon from 2001 to 2024.

== Early life ==
Djanogly was born in London to a British Jewish family, the son of multimillionaire textile manufacturer Harry Djanogly.

== Education ==
Djanogly was privately educated at University College School, an independent school for boys in Hampstead in north London, followed by Oxford Polytechnic in Oxford, where he was elected chairman of the Conservative Association in 1987, and he earned a Bachelor of Arts in law and politics in 1987. He took his law finals at the College of Law, Guildford, in 1988.

== Professional career ==
Djanogly joined SJ Berwin, London, in 1988 as a trainee solicitor, was admitted as a solicitor in 1990, and served as corporate finance partner between 1998 and 2009.

== Political career ==
Djanogly was elected as a councillor for Regents Park ward in the City of Westminster in 1994 and was re-elected in 1998. He unsuccessfully contested the seat of Oxford East at the 1997 general election. Before the 2001 general election he was selected as the Conservative Party candidate for the safe seat of Huntingdon, following the retirement of former Prime Minister of the United Kingdom Sir John Major. Djanogly resigned from his council seat early in 2001, shortly before the general election campaign.

At the 2001 general election, Djanogly held the Huntingdon seat comfortably with a majority of 12,792 votes and has remained as the MP for the constituency ever since. He made his maiden speech in the House of Commons on 2 July 2001.

He served on the Trade and Industry Select committee from 2001. He also campaigned for better protection against animal rights extremists, who had been targeting employees of Huntingdon Life Sciences in his constituency.

In 2004, he was promoted to the frontbench by Michael Howard as an opposition spokesman on Home Affairs, and served as Solicitor General between May 2004 and May 2010, succeeding Nick Hawkins. In 2005 Djanogly was also appointed a shadow Business Minister in the team shadowing the Department of Trade and Industry (United Kingdom) (now the Department for Business, Innovation and Skills) where until the 2010 general election he worked on corporate governance and business regulations.

Since leaving Government in 2012, Djanogly has been elected Secretary of the All Party Parliamentary Group on Corporate Governance and Joint Chair of the All Party Parliamentary Group on Corporate Responsibility. Djanogly served eight months as a member of the Public Accounts Committee. until July 2024.

In 2015, Djanogly sought to be elected as Chair of the Justice Select Committee. He lost the position to Bob Neill.

Djanogly was opposed to Brexit before the 2016 referendum. In December 2017 Djanogly voted along with ten other Conservative MPs against the government, and in favour of guaranteeing Parliament a "meaningful vote" on any deal Theresa May agreed with Brussels over Brexit.

=== Courts and legal aid ===
Following the formation of the coalition government Djanogly was named on 14 May 2010 as Parliamentary Under-Secretary of State at the Ministry of Justice, a post he held until September 2012. His role included the oversight of legal aid and legal services, HM Courts Service, as well as the Criminal Cases Review Commission.

As part of the Ministry of Justice's target to reduce its spending by £2 billion, Djanogly was tasked with reducing the legal aid budget by £350 million. In June 2011, he was one of the Ministers that introduced the Legal Aid, Sentencing and Punishment of Offenders Bill (LASPO) to Parliament. Djanogly led the Bill process and it became law on 1 May 2012.

On 29 March 2011, Djanogly launched a consultation: "Solving disputes in the County Courts", initiating a general review of civil law procedures, that included; increasing the small claims limit to £10,000, creating a single County Court and extending mediation assessment to all small claims.

In an attempt to counter a perceived "compensation culture" in litigation in September 2011, Djanogly announced the Government's intention to ban referral fees in personal injury claims. The ban was included in the LASPO Bill, together with provisions preventing the recovery of claimant solicitors' success fees from losing defendants, intended to reform 'no win, no fee' deals.

In October 2011, Djanogly announced non-lawyers would be allowed to invest in and own legal businesses for the first time. In 2017 the impact of these changes was considered to be mixed: they had not delivered the intended reduction in the cost of legal services, but there had been improvements in management arrangements and fee structures.

In February 2012, Djanogly proposed a major legal overhaul of the bailiff industry to clamp down on bad practices. The proposals included a new regulatory body to oversee the industry, a new complaints process for debtors and clear fees so that people know what bailiffs can charge.

In July 2012, Djanogly announced the Government's intention to introduce a certificate declaring someone as 'presumed dead' to help families resolve the affairs of a missing person.

=== Employment law ===
As a shadow Business Minister Djanogly had proposed changes to employment law and continued this in Government. In January 2011 he launched a consultation: "Resolving Workplace Disputes", jointly with Ed Davey MP (who at the time was a Business Minister). The consultation led to measures which changed the practice and procedure of employment tribunals and how disputes could be resolved without recourse to tribunals. In July 2012 Djanogly also revealed plans to tailor employment tribunal fees to encourage businesses and workers to mediate or settle a dispute rather than go to a full hearing from summer 2013.

Djanogly said, "It's not fair on the taxpayer to foot the entire £84 million bill for people to escalate workplace disputes to a tribunal. We want people, where they can, to pay a fair contribution for the system they are using, which will encourage them to look for alternatives." Bringing a claim or an appeal to the employment tribunal is currently free of charge with the full cost being met by the taxpayer. By introducing fees, people using employment tribunals will start to contribute a significant proportion of the £84 million cost of running the system. The aim is to reduce the taxpayer subsidy of these tribunals by transferring some of the cost to those who use the service, while protecting access to justice for all. HM Courts & Tribunals Service figures published in September 2014 subsequently showed that tribunals received 71% fewer claims in the quarter April to June than in the same period in 2013 – the smallest figure since records began in 2008/09.

=== Court reform ===
Djanogly was the Minister responsible for the courts service during the August riots of 2011 when a decision was taken to direct the riot cases to a limited number of magistrates courts sitting 24 hours a day for seven days a week. Djanogly was also responsible for the merger of HM Courts Service with the Tribunals Service to create HMCTS on 1 April 2011. There were also major changes to the court estate, with 93 magistrates courts and 49 county courts being closed (out of a total of 530 courts), alongside proposals to reinvest £22 million of savings into the modernisation of the remaining court estate.

=== Family law ===
As Minister for Family Law, Djanogly's main thrust was preparing the Government's response to, and implementation of, the Family Justice Review conducted by David Norgrove, which reported in November 2011. In private family law, Djanogly championed mediation saying, "Mediation for example may well play a larger role in resolving family justice matters in the future. As well as avoiding the expense of court, it has already been shown that in some circumstances, agreements reached through mediation are better adhered to than court judgements." In public family law, the focus became a need to reduce the length of care cases which, on average, were taking 61 weeks. Djanogly said "In my view there is no time to waste in reforming a system which has in the past years under-delivered for the many families, children, practitioners and staff that it is meant to be there to support."

=== Defamation ===
In May 2012 Djanogly was one of the ministers who introduced the Defamation Bill and he led on its progress through the House of Commons until it reached Report stage. The bill satisfied the coalition agreement to reform the law of defamation.

== Controversy ==
=== 2009 expenses scandal ===
In the 2009 expenses scandal it was suggested that Djanogly improperly claimed expenses for a "cleaner" who was actually a childminder. In response Djanogly stated that the person in question was employed as a cleaner although "there would clearly have been times during evenings when she would have been there with a child alone, but this was not her job or what she was paid to do" and acknowledged that the person received no other payment for any services provided. In May 2009, The Daily Telegraph disclosed that Mr Djanogly claimed almost £5,000 on his parliamentary expenses for the installation of gates at his constituency home. The MP installed the gates following security fears, after he helped constituents threatened by animal rights activists, and he was not required to repay the sum following the Legg audit of MPs' expenses in 2010.

Djanogly initially repaid £25,000 but denied that his arrangements had been improper. The Legg audit subsequently found that £17,364.76 had been improperly claimed but did not require any further repayment as more than this amount had already been received.

=== Private detectives ===
In September 2010 it was revealed that Djanology had hired private detectives in 2009 to uncover the source of leaks to media about his parliamentary expenses. Following a complaint to the UK Information Commissioner's Office by John Mann MP in connection with Djanogly's hiring of private detectives, on 27 July 2011 the Information Commissioner said that he would not be investigating Djanogly for breaches of the Data Protection Act.

=== Regulation of claims management firms ===
In October 2011 Djanogly was stripped of his role of regulating Claims Management firms after it was revealed he failed to disclose conflicts of interest regarding his family members holding shares in said companies. The Ministry of Justice said "The Cabinet Secretary has concluded that Jonathan Djanogly took the appropriate steps to prevent any conflict between his financial interests and his Ministerial duties. There is no evidence that he acted in any way other than in the public interest."

In a letter to Labour's justice spokesman, Andy Slaughter, who had raised the matter, Gus O'Donnell said that while there is "no suggestion of any impropriety in relation" to Djanogly's brother-in-law's firms that "for the avoidance of doubt decisions about the regulation of individual (claims management companies) should henceforth be handled by another minister". Djanogly requested that the Claims Management Regulation Unit be overseen by a different Justice Minister, to avoid any possible distraction from this important issue after it was suggested that he and his family could personally profit. Djanogly stated that neither he nor his Labour predecessor had ever had to make a decision in relation to the claims management unit, because decisions were delegated to officials, but it seemed prudent to head off any future allegation. Claims management regulation policy however remained within his brief and on 22 August 2012, Djanogly launched a consultation to amend the conduct rules of claims managers and on 28 August 2012 announced that from 2013, the legal ombudsman would handle claims management complaints.

=== 2022–23 legal claim by housekeeper ===
In May 2022, Djanogly's wife, Miss Rebecca Silk, lost an employment tribunal to a former employee, Miss H. Settas, which was later commented on in some parts of the press including the Telegraph in February 2023 following an interview given by Miss Settas to the Sunday Mirror.

== Personal life ==
Djanogly has been married to Rebecca Jane Silk since 1991 and has two children, a son and a daughter. He is the son-in-law of former Wimbledon champion Angela Buxton.

Parliament of the United Kingdom
Preceded by John Major	Member of Parliament for Huntingdon; 2001–2024	Succeeded by Ben Obese-Jecty
Political offices
Preceded by Nick Hawkins	Shadow Solicitor General for England and Wales; 2004–2010	Succeeded by Maria Eagle
Preceded by The Lord Bach	Parliamentary Under-Secretary of State for Courts and Legal Aid; 2010–2012	Succeeded by Helen Grant
