= Jason Oakes (rugby union) =

English rugby union player

- Born: Jason Oakes; 29 September 1977 (age 49) Shotley Bridge, County Durham, England
- Height: 6 ft 7 in (2.01 m)
- Weight: 19 st 1 lb (121 kg)
- School: Haydon Bridge School

Rugby union career
- Position: Lock
- Current team: Newcastle Falcons
Senior career
Years	Team	Apps	(Points)
- Blaydon
- Otley
2006 -	Newcastle Falcons	30	(10)

Jason Oakes born 29 September 1977 in Shotley Bridge, County Durham, England was a rugby union player for Newcastle Falcons in the Guinness Premiership. Oakes' position of choice is as a lock. He has previously played for Otley and Blaydon.

In 2007 Oakes was forced to retire due to injury.
