= Harry Djanogly =

English textile manufacturer, art collector and philanthropist

Sir Harry Djanogly CBE
- Born: 1 August 1938 (age 87); France
- Occupation: Businessman
- Known for: Philanthropy, Art collection

Sir Harry Arieh Simon Djanogly, CBE (born 1 August 1938) is an English textile manufacturer, art collector and philanthropist. Djanogly, who is estimated to be worth £300 million, made his fortune from the merger of his Nottingham Manufacturing Company with other textile interests in 1986 to form Coats Viyella.

His son, Jonathan Djanogly, a Conservative politician, was the Member of Parliament for Huntingdon from 2001 until 2024.

== Early life ==
Born in France, Djanogly emigrated to the United Kingdom as a child fleeing from the Nazis and was naturalised a British subject on 1 November 1948.

== Philanthropy ==
Djanogly is an active philanthropist and has an art collection that has been said to include the largest number of Lowrys in the world, as well as works by Picasso and Monet.

The Djanoglys have contributed to the founding of many venues in their home town of Nottingham, such as the Djanogly City Academy, Djanogly Community Leisure Centre, Djanogly Community Orchestra, Djanogly Recital Hall, Djanogly Theatre and the Djanogly Gallery.

Since the 1970s, Djanogly has supported institutions such as Tate, the British Museum, National Gallery and National Portrait Gallery.

== Honours ==
Djanogly was appointed a Commander of the Order of the British Empire in the 1983 Birthday Honours and knighted in the 1993 New Year Honours for charitable services.

Djanogly and his wife have also been recognised by the University of Nottingham as part of the College of Benefactors.

In 2014, Djanogly and his wife were awarded the Prince of Wales Medal for Arts Philanthropy.
