= Academy (English school) =

Type of independent state school in England

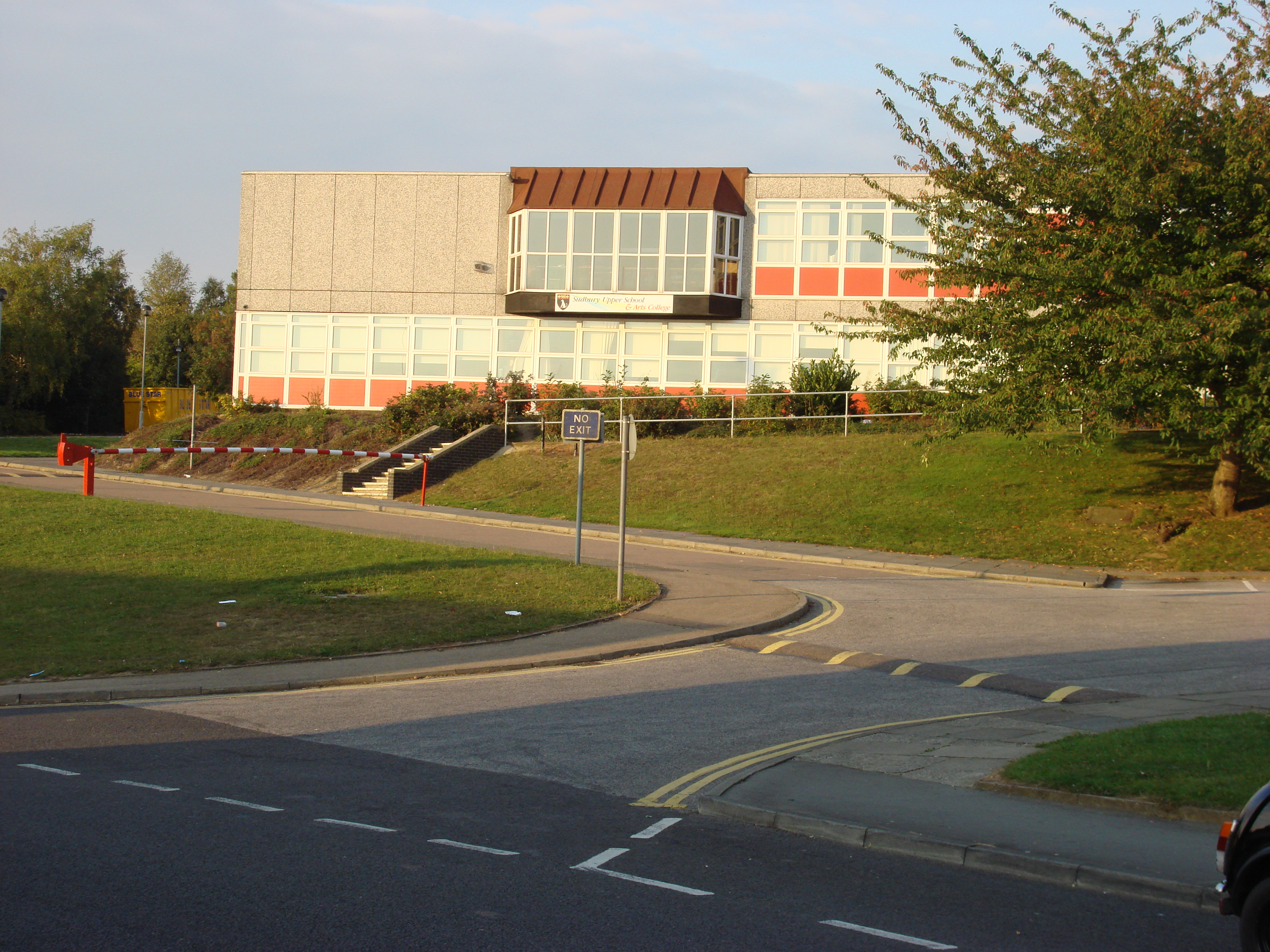
Ormiston Sudbury Academy is a secondary school in Sudbury, Suffolk with academy status.

In England, an academy (or academy school) is a state-funded school which is directly funded by the Department for Education and independent of local authority control. The terms of the arrangements are set out in individual Academy Funding Agreements. 80% of secondary schools, 40% of primary schools and 44% of special schools are academies as of October 2023.

Academies are self-governing non-profit charitable trusts and may receive additional support from personal or corporate sponsors, either financially or in kind. Academies are inspected and follow the same rules on admissions, special educational needs and exclusions as other state schools and students sit the same national exams. They have more autonomy with the National Curriculum, but must ensure their curriculum is broad and balanced, and that it includes the core subjects of English, maths and science. They must also teach relationships and sex education, and religious education. They are free to choose their specialisms.

== Types ==
The following are all types of academy:

- Sponsored academy: A formerly maintained school that has been transformed to academy status as part of a government intervention strategy. They are consequently run by a Government-approved sponsor. They are sometimes referred to as traditional academies.
- Converter academy: A formerly maintained school that has voluntarily converted to academy status. It is not necessary for a converter academy to have a sponsor.
- Free school: Free schools are new academies established since 2011 via the Free School Programme. From May 2015, usage of the term was also extended to new academies set up via a Local Authority competition. The majority of free schools are similar in size and shape to other types of academy. However, the following are distinctive sub-types of free school:
  - Studio school: A small free school, usually with around 300 pupils, using project-based learning
  - University Technical College: A free school for the 14–18 age group, specialising in practical, employment focused subjects, sponsored by a university, employer or further education college.
  - Maths school: A selective sixth form free school for those with significant mathematical aptitude, specialising in mathematics. They are sponsored by a selective mathematics university.
- Faith academy: An academy with an official faith designation.
- Co-operative academy: An academy that uses an alternative co-operative academy agreement.

An academy trust that operates more than one academy is known as a multi-academy trust, although sometimes the terms academy group or academy federation are used instead. An academy chain is a group of trusts working together under a shared management structure.

== Features ==
An academy is an independent state school governed by the Academy Agreement it makes with the Department for Education, and at that point it severs connections with the local education authority. The current advisory text is the Academy and free school: master funding agreement dated March 2018. The governors of the academy are obliged to publish an annual report and accounts, that are open to scrutiny and inspections.

All academies are expected to follow a broad and balanced curriculum but many have a particular focus on, or formal specialism in, one or more areas such as science; arts; business and enterprise; computing; engineering; mathematics; modern foreign languages; performing arts; sport; or technology. Although academies are required to follow some aspects of the National Curriculum, they are otherwise free to innovate; however, as they participate in the same Key Stage 3 and GCSE exams as other English schools, they teach a curriculum very similar to other schools, with only small variations.

Like other state schools, academies are required to adhere to the National Admissions Code, although newly established academies with a faith designation are subject to the 50% Rule requiring them to allocate at least half of their places without reference to faith. In terms of their governance, academies are established as companies limited by guarantee with a board of directors that acts as a Trust. The Academy Trust has exempt charity status, regulated by the Department for Education. The trustees are legally, but not financially, accountable for the operation of the academy. The Trust serves as the legal entity of which the school is part. The trustees oversee the running of the school, sometimes delegating responsibility to a local governing body which they appoint. The day-to-day management of the school is, as in most schools, conducted by the head teacher and their senior management team. In Sponsored Academies, the sponsor is able to influence the process of establishing the school, including its curriculum, ethos, specialism and building (if a new one is built). The sponsor also has the power to appoint governors to the academy's governing body.

== History ==
Academies logo from the 2000s and 2010s

The Labour Government under Tony Blair established academies through the Learning and Skills Act 2000, which amended the section of the Education Act 1996 relating to City Technology Colleges. They were first announced as part of the Fresh Start programme in a speech by David Blunkett, then Secretary of State for Education and Skills, in 2000. He said that their aim was "to improve pupil performance and break the cycle of low expectations." As of 2018 many academies are struggling financially and running deficits.

The chief architect of the policy was Andrew Adonis (now Lord Adonis, formerly Secretary of State at the Department for Transport) in his capacity as education advisor to the Prime Minister in the late 1990s.

Academies were known as City Academies for the first few years, but the term was changed to Academies by an amendment in the Education Act 2002. The term Sponsored Academies was applied retroactively to this type of academy, to distinguish it from other types of academy that were enabled later.

By 2024, about 80% of state-funded secondary schools were academies or free schools, and about 40% of primary schools were academies.

=== Sponsored academies ===
Sponsored Academies originally needed a private sponsor who could be an individual (such as Sir David Garrard, who sponsors Business Academy Bexley), organisations such as the United Learning Trust, mission-driven businesses such as The Co-operative Group or outsourcing for-profit businesses such as Amey plc). These sponsors were expected to bring "the best of private-sector best practice and innovative management" to academies, "often in marked contrast to the lack of leadership experienced by the failing schools that academies have replaced" (known as predecessor schools). They were originally required to contribute 10% of the academy's capital costs (up to a maximum of £2m). The remainder of the capital and running costs were met by the state in the usual way for UK state schools through grants funded by the local authority.

The Government later removed the requirement for financial investment by a private sponsor in a move to encourage successful existing schools and charities to become sponsors.

Sponsored Academies typically replaced one or more existing schools, but some were newly established. They were intended to address the problem of entrenched failure within English schools with low academic achievement, or schools situated in communities with low academic aspirations. Often these schools had been placed in "special measures" after an Ofsted inspection, as has been the case for schools in the Co-op Academies Trust (one of the larger business-supported trusts). They were expected to be creative and innovative because of their financial and academic freedoms, in order to deal with the long-term issues they were intended to solve.

Originally all Sponsored Academies had to have a curriculum specialism within the English Specialist Schools Programme (SSP). However, this requirement was removed in 2010. By May 2010 there were 203 Sponsored Academies in England.

=== Converter academies ===
The Academies Act 2010 sought to increase the number of academies. It enabled all maintained schools to convert to academy status, known as Converter Academies and enabled new academies to be created via the Free School Programme.

At the same time the new Conservative-led Coalition Government announced that they would redirect funding for school Specialisms [i.e. Technology College Status] into mainstream funding. This meant that Secondary Schools would no longer directly receive ring-fenced funds of £130K from Government for each of their specialisms. One way to regain some direct control over their finances and retain specialist funding was to become a Converter Academy and receive all of their funding direct from Government, with the possibility of buying in services at a cheaper rate. This, along with some schools wanting more independence from local authority control, meant that many state secondary schools in England converted to academy status in subsequent years.

By April 2011, the number of academies had increased to 629, and by August 2011, reached 1,070. By July 2012 this number reached 1,957, double that of the previous year. and, at 1 November 2013, it stood at 3,444.

=== Financial accountability ===
The Education Funding Agency monitors financial management and governance of academies. In March 2016 the Perry Beeches The Academy Trust, a multi-academy trust, was found to have deleted financial records for £2.5 million of free school meal funding, and that the chief executive was being paid by sub-contractors as well as by the trust. Its schools are likely to be taken over by a new trust. In August 2016, the former principal and founder of Kings Science Academy, the former finance director, and a former teacher who was the founder's sister were found guilty of defrauding public funds of £150,000.

In October 2017, the Wakefield City Academies Trust collapsed, and The Observer reported that "Wakefield City Academies Trust now stands accused of 'asset stripping" after it transferred millions of pounds of the schools' savings to its own accounts before collapsing. On 8 September it released a statement announcing it would divest itself of its 21 schools as it could not undertake the 'rapid improvement our academies need' ".

In March 2022, a report by parliament's Public Accounts Committee found that academy trusts paying a staff member more than £100,000 had increased from 1,875 to 2,245 in 2020–2021 from the previous financial year. A promised review of high pay by the Department for Education had not been published. The committee concluded that lack of financial transparency undermined parents' capacity to hold school leaders and the funding agencies to account.

== The converting procedure (2018) ==
The governors of a school are persuaded to consider academy status, perhaps in response to an approach by a multi-academy trust (MAT). They have two choices: remain with their current local authority, or join a multi-academy trust; converting to be a stand-alone trust ceased to be an option prior to 2018. If they were only given a 'satisfactory' (now referred to as 'require[ing] improvement') Ofsted rating, they don't have the power to make the decision. The governors assess the MATs available and willing to take them on. Ethos and values, geographical mix of schools and practicality, how individual schools have succeeded in retaining their identity, value for money, and the trust's capacity to support the development of schools and staff are all factors that are compared. The governors then select a partner trust.

They then register interest with the DfE and inform the Regional Schools Commission. Governors open consultation with parents and staff, and with this information make a decision as to whether to proceed. Assuming they do, the Regional Schools Commissioner approves the decision to join the selected trust and the Secretary of State issues an academy order. The school staff to are transferred to the MAT in accordance with TUPE regulations, and land and commercial assets are transferred from the local authority. The school can change its mind until documents are sent to the Secretary of State in order to be signed; this is usually around three weeks before the agreed conversion date.

There are legal costs involved, and £25,000 is given to a converting academy to cover these costs. The local authority must grant a 125-year lease to the academy trust for the land. School land and playing fields are protected under Section 77 of the School Standards and Framework Act 1998. The school pays a proportion of its central funding to the MAT for shared services but can in theory take better measures to ensure best value.

== Support ==
Whilst still in the fairly early stage of development, supporters pointed to emerging data showing "striking" improvements in GCSE results for academies compared to their predecessors, with early results showing that "GCSE results are improving twice as fast in academies as in state schools".

In an article in The Observer, that regarded many of the Government's claims for academies with scepticism, journalist Geraldine Bedell conceded that:

They seem, so far, to be working – not all as spectacularly as Mossbourne, but much better than most of the struggling inner-city schools they replaced.

The article singles out the cited academy, Mossbourne Community Academy in Hackney, as "apparently the most popular [school] in Britain – at least with politicians" and "the top school in the country for value-added results".

== Criticism and opposition ==
Academies have continued to be controversial, and their existence has frequently been opposed and challenged by some politicians, commentators, teachers, teachers' unions, and parents. Even after several years of operation and with a number of academies open and reporting successes, the programme continues to come under attack for creating schools that are said to be, among other things, a waste of money, selective, damaging to the schools and communities around them, forced on parents who do not want them, and a move towards privatisation of education "by the back door".

=== Opposition within Labour ===
The introduction of academy schools was opposed by teachers' trade unions and some high-profile figures within the Labour Party, such as former party leader Lord Kinnock. Neil Kinnock criticised the academies scheme, saying that they were a "distortion of choice" and risked creating a "seller's market" with "schools selecting parents and children instead of parents selecting schools".

=== Education Select Committee in 2005 ===
The House of Commons Education and Skills Select Committee reported in March 2005 that it would have been wiser to limit the programme to 30 or 50 academies in order to evaluate the results before expanding the programme, and that "the rapid expansion of the Academy policy comes at the expense of rigorous evaluation". The Select Committee was concerned that the promising results achieved by some academies may be due to increased exclusions of harder-to-teach pupils. They noted that two Middlesbrough academies had expelled 61 pupils, compared to just 15 from all other secondary schools in the borough.

=== Criticism of choice of sponsors ===
The programme of creating academies has also been heavily criticised by some for handing schools to private sector entrepreneurs who in many cases have no experience of the education sector: such as the Evangelical Christian car dealer, Sir Peter Vardy, who has been accused of promoting the teaching of creationism alongside macroevolution in his Emmanuel Schools Foundation academies. This is also linked to the wider debate in the education sector as to the benefits or otherwise of the growing role of religion in the school system being promoted by the New Labour government in general, and Tony Blair in particular, with many academies (one estimate puts it at "more than half") being sponsored either by religious groups or organisations/individuals with a religious affiliation.

A parliamentary report in 2015, entitled "Free Schools and Academies", recommends that "In the meantime the Government should stop exaggerating the success of academies and be cautious about firm conclusions except where the evidence merits it. Academisation is not always successful nor is it the only proven alternative for a struggling school". In 2016 a major study by the Education Policy Institute found no significant differences in performance between academies and local council run schools.

=== Expense and diversion of funding ===
The original City Academy programme was attacked for its expense: it cost on average £25M to build an academy under this scheme, much of which was taken up by the costs of new buildings. Critics contend that this is significantly more than it costs to build a new local authority school. Some operators are paying senior staff six-figure salaries, partly funded by central government.

In December 2012, the Public Accounts Committee of the House of Commons questioned Henry Stewart, of the Local Schools Network, and Rachel Wolf, of the New Schools Network, on accountability and funding of academies and free schools. The committee was review a report by the Auditor General, Managing the Expansion of the Academies Programme (HC 682), which had identified that in 2011–12 £96,000,000 had been diverted from supporting under-performing Local Authority schools to the academies programme, followed by a further £400,000,000 in the financial year 2012–13. The committee also questioned Chris Wormald, then Permanent Secretary at the Department for Education, who admitted that the Government had deliberately chosen to remove money originally allocated to support under-performing schools. Chris Wormald stated, "The Government took a very conscious decision that its major school improvement programme was the academies programme."

=== Effectiveness ===
In December 2018, the Sutton Trust published a report on the effectiveness of MATs in improving the performance of disadvantaged children, with its authors noting that "Our five-year analysis of sponsor academies' provision for disadvantaged pupils shows that while a few chains are demonstrating transformational results for these pupils, more are struggling."

== Party policies, and developments since the end of the Labour Government ==
The Conservative Party has supported the academy proposal from its inception but wants the scheme to go further. This accord was reflected in a remark made by Conservative spokesman David Willetts in 2006:

I am more authentically Andrew Adonis than Andrew Adonis is.

— David Willetts,

In 2004, the Liberal Democrats were reported as being "split" on the issue and so decided that academies should not be mentioned in the party's education policy. The position of Phil Willis, the education spokesman at the time, was summarised as:

… there [are] no plans to abolish either city academies or specialist schools if the Lib Dems came to power, though "they would be brought under local authority control".

— Phil Willis,

In 2005, Willis' successor, Ed Davey, argued that academies were creating a "two-tier education system" and called for the academy programme to be halted until "a proper analysis can be done". At the subsequent election, Academies were supported by all three main political parties, with a further cross-party initiative to extend the programme into primary schools currently being considered.

In 2010 the Conservatives and Liberal Democrats coalition government announced plans to expand the academy programme with the Academies Act 2010. In May 2010 the then Education secretary Michael Gove wrote to all state schools in England inviting them to opt out of Local Authority control and convert to Academy status. Gove also stated that some academies could be created in time for the new Academic year in September 2010. By 23 July 2010, 153 schools in England had applied for academy status, lower than the prediction that more than 1,000 would do so. In spite of the expanding Academy programme, in August 2010 Gove announced that 75 existing academy rebuild projects were likely to be scaled back. Nevertheless, by September 2012, the majority of state secondary schools in England had become Academies. Monthly updated information on existing academies and free schools, and applications in process, is published by the Department for Education.

== Comparisons ==
The city academy programme was originally based on the programme of City Technology Colleges (CTCs) created by the Conservative government under Margaret Thatcher in the 1980s, which were also business-sponsored. From 2003, the Government encouraged CTCs to convert to academies; did so (for example, Djanogly CTC is now Djanogly City Academy) was a 2003 conversion.

Academies differ from CTCs in several ways; most notably, academies cannot select more than 10% of pupils by ability, whereas CTCs can. Academies have been compared to US charter schools, which are publicly funded schools largely independent of state and federal control.

== Multi-academy trusts ==
A number of private and charitable organisations run groups of academies, known as Multi-Academy Trusts (MATs). These major operators include ARK Schools, Academies Enterprise Trust, E-ACT (formerly Edutrust Academies Charitable Trust), Emmanuel Schools Foundation, Harris Federation, Oasis Trust, Ormiston Academies Trust, Tauheedul Education Trust and United Learning Trust.

The Department for Education publishes a full list of active academy sponsors.

=== Concern about MATs taking over primary schools that are then rebrokered ===
In 2019 there were 5,539 primary academies in England, of which 514 were forced away from local authority control after being failed by Ofsted. The Department for Education (DfE) paid out at least £18.4m to the academy trusts taking on these schools. The parents, governors and local authorities had no say in how this money was spent or how the assets were used.

Since 2013–14, more than 300 primary academies have been rebrokered (receiving government setup money again) or moved between trusts. In 2017–8, seven trusts running primary schools closed leaving all their schools in search of another sponsor. This leads to uncertainty and expense as the new trust will rebrand and parents must pay for new school uniform. New rules, staff and systems are set in place.

== See also ==
- Academies Financial Handbook
- State-funded schools in England
- Specialist schools in the United Kingdom
- Specialist Schools and Academies Trust
- University Technical College
- Comprehensive school
- Foundation school
- Grant-maintained school
- Co-operative academy
