= Trade Union Act =

Stock short title used in legislation

Trade Union Act (with its many variations) is a stock short title used for legislation in various countries which relates to trade unions. The Bill for an Act with this short title will have been known as a Trade Union Bill during its passage through Parliament.

Trade Union Acts may be a generic name either for legislation bearing that short title or for all legislation which amends the law relating to trade unions. In the United Kingdom, it is a term of art.

== List ==
=== Australia ===
- The Trade Union Act 1915 (Queensland)
- The Trade Union Act 1881 (New South Wales)

=== Canada ===
- The Trade Unions Act, 1872
- The Trade Unions Act, 1985

=== India ===
- The Trade Unions Act, 1926 (Replaced by Industrial Relations Code, 2020)

=== Japan ===
- The Trade Union Act of 1949

=== Laos ===
- The Trade Union Act 2007

=== Malaysia ===
- The Trade Unions Act 1959

=== Sudan ===
- The Trade Unions Act of 1971

=== Tanzania ===
- The Trade Union Act No. 10 (1998)

=== United Kingdom ===
- The Trade Union Act 1871 (34 & 35 Vict. c. 31)
- The Trade Union Act Amendment Act 1876 (39 & 40 Vict. c. 22)
- The Trade Disputes Act 1906 (6 Edw. 7. c. 47)
- The Trade Union Act 1913 (3 & 4 Geo. 5. c. 30)
- The Trade Union (Amalgamation) Act 1917 (7 & 8 Geo. 5. c. 24)
- The Trade Disputes and Trade Unions Act 1927 (17 & 18 Geo. 5. c. 22)
- The Trade Disputes and Trade Unions Act 1946 (9 & 10 Geo. 6. c. 52)
- The Trade Union (Amalgamations, etc.) Act 1964 (c. 24)
- The Trade Disputes Act 1965 (c. 48)
- The Trade Union and Labour Relations Act 1974 (c. 52)
- The Trade Union and Labour Relations (Amendment) Act 1976 (c. 7)
- The Trade Union Act 1984 (c. 49)
- The Trade Union and Labour Relations (Consolidation) Act 1992 (c. 52)
- The Trade Union Reform and Employment Rights Act 1993 (c. 19)
- The Trade Union Act 2016 (c. 15)
- The Trade Union (Wales) Act 2017 (anaw 4)

The Trade Union Acts

- The Trade Union Acts 1871 to 1906 means the Trade Union Acts 1871 and 1876 and Trade Disputes Act 1906.
- The Trade Union Acts 1871 to 1913 means the Trade Union Acts 1871 to 1906 and the Trade Union Act 1913.
- The Trade Union Acts 1871 to 1964 means the Trade Union Acts 1871 to 1913 and the Trade Union (Amalgamations) Act 1964.
- The Trade Union Acts 1871 to 1971 means ... It is applicable to Northern Ireland.

== See also ==
- List of short titles
