= Amalgamated Society of Railway Servants v Osborne =

UK labour law case

ASRS v Osborne
- Court: House of Lords
- Citation: [1910] AC 87

Case history
- Prior action: [1909] 1 Ch 163
- Subsequent action: [1911] 1 Ch 540

Keywords
- Political donations, ultra vires, trade unions, Labour Party

Amalgamated Society of Railway Servants v Osborne [1910] AC 87 is a UK labour law case, which ruled that it was unlawful (ultra vires - beyond their legal powers) for trade unions to use funds raised from their subscriptions for political purposes (including funding the Labour Party or Labour candidates).

== Facts ==
Osborne, a member of the Amalgamated Society of Railway Servants for 16 years in Walthamstow, alleged that the union's creation of a political fund to support the Labour Representation Committee in elections was done irregularly in breach of union procedure. The original rules, from 1900, contained no reference to seeking Parliamentary representation. Because of the irregularity, it was argued that the donations by the union were ultra vires and void.

== Judgment ==
=== House of Lords ===
The House of Lords held that a union’s authority was circumscribed by the union’s rules. Use of union funds for any purpose other than those enumerated in the union rules was ultra vires.

== Expulsion and further action ==
After bringing his action, Mr Osborne was expelled from the union. He brought a further claim that his expulsion was wrongful.

=== Court of Appeal ===
The Court of Appeal held that he was wrongfully excluded. Lord Cozens-Hardy MR noted that the union was, at common law, a lawful association.

The society is a lawful association at common law. It is possessed of considerable property which belongs to the members, and any member unjustly excluded may invoke the assistance of the Court. This principle has been repeatedly acted upon in the case of West-end clubs, and the conclusion is enough to dispose of the appeal in favour of the appellant; but we have had able arguments on the second proposition, and it seems desirable that I should state my view upon it, in case it should be held elsewhere that the society is an illegal association at common law on the ground of restraint of trade. I may add that the mere introduction of some objectionable rules will not necessarily taint the whole of the rules. As was observed by Lindley L.J. in Swaine v Wilson, “No doubt if the real object of this society were unduly to fetter trade its rules might all be tainted by the vice of the object, and none of the rules might be enforceable.” In the present case there is no evidence to shew how the rules are in fact used, even if such evidence would be admissible, as to which I express no opinion. We have nothing but the rules before us, and everything turns upon the construction of these rules.

== Significance ==
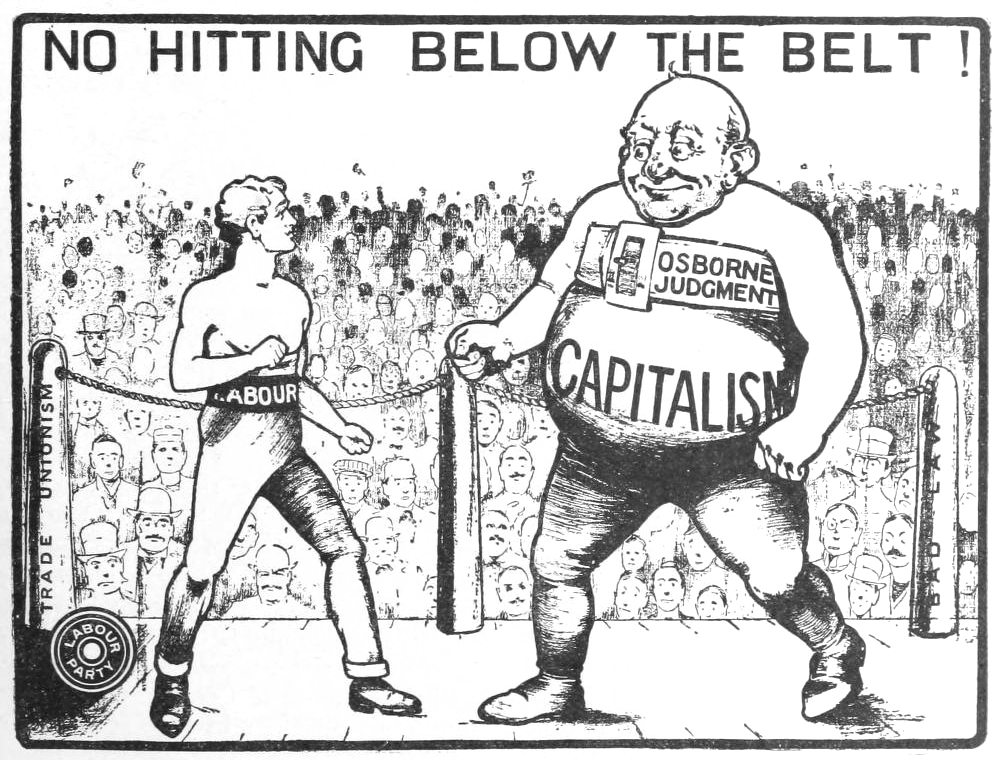
1912 Labour Party poster

The House of Lords judgment threatened one of the Labour party's main funding sources. This was especially detrimental to the Labour Party as its supporters were generally poorer than other political parties. The two elections in 1910 saw Labour gain 40 seats and 42 seats respectively. In 1911 H. H. Asquith's government decided, for the first time, that MPs should receive a salary. (Previously, only people with savings or funding organizations behind them could become Members of Parliament.) David Lloyd George, the Chancellor of the Exchequer gave MPs a wage of £400 per annum, which alleviated financial problems.

The Osborne judgment was superseded in 1913 by the Trade Union Act 1913, which confirmed the lawfulness of union political funds, but which compromised by giving members the choice to opt out of paying into them. The Trade Disputes and Trade Unions Act 1927 required union members to opt into the political fund. The Trade Disputes and Trade Unions Act 1946 repealed the 1927 Act and again required that members opt out. Under TULRCA 1992 s 82, members had the right to not contribute to a political fund, not be discriminated against for it, and the right to complain to the Certification Officer, but this was overturned by Sections 11 and 12 of the Trade Union Act 2016 which requires members to opt in to a political fund, and to be given details about how this money will be used.

== See also ==
- UK labour law
- Trade Union Act 1913
- Trade Disputes and Trade Unions Act 1927
- Trade Disputes and Trade Unions Act 1946
- TULRCA 1992 s 82
- Trade Union Act 2016
