= Employment Rights Act 2025 =

Act of the Parliament of the United Kingdom

Employment Rights Act 2025 (Note: Section 160.)
- Act of Parliament
- Parliament of the United Kingdom
- Long title: An Act to make provision to amend the law relating to employment rights; to make provision about procedure for handling redundancies; to make provision about the treatment of workers involved in the supply of services under certain public contracts; to provide for duties to be imposed on employers in relation to equality; to amend the definition of “employment business” in the Employment Agencies Act 1973; to provide for the establishment of the School Support Staff Negotiating Body and Social Care Negotiating Bodies; to amend the Seafarers’ Wages Act 2023; to make provision for the implementation of international agreements relating to maritime employment; to make provision about trade unions, industrial action, employers’ associations and the functions of the Certification Officer; to make provision about the enforcement of legislation relating to the labour market; and for connected purposes.
- Citation: 2025 c. 36
- Introduced by: Jonathan Reynolds, Secretary of State for Business and Trade (Commons); Baroness Jones of Whitchurch, Parliamentary Under-Secretary of State for Legislation (Lords)
- Territorial extent: Great Britain (most parts); England and Wales (part 3); United Kingdom (clause 25 of part 2; parts 5 and 6); (Note: Section 158.)

Dates
- Royal assent: 18 December 2025
- Commencement: Various (Note: Section 159.)
Other legislation
Amends	Employment Agencies Act 1973; Social Security Contributions and Benefits Act 1992; Social Security Contributions and Benefits (Northern Ireland) Act 1992; Pension Schemes Act 1993; Employment Tribunals Act 1996; Employment Rights Act 1996; Trade Union Act 2016; Data Protection Act 2018; Sentencing Act 2020
Repeals/revokes	Strikes (Minimum Service Levels) Act 2023; Workers (Predictable Terms and Conditions) Act 2023

Status: Current legislation

History of passage through Parliament

Text of statute as originally enacted

Revised text of statute as amended

The Employment Rights Act 2025 (c. 36) is an act of the Parliament of the United Kingdom that alters UK labour law. In 2021, the Labour Party conference launched a New Deal for Working People that pledged to bring the UK up to international standards, including measures to "ban zero hours contracts", enable workers to claim employment rights on "day one", "outlaw fire and rehire", create a "single status of worker" to protect everyone who works, "establish Fair Pay Agreements across the economy", and create a "single enforcement body", the Fair Work Agency, properly funded to "enforce workers' rights".

As the 2024 election approached, Labour changed its pledges to a reduced package of reforms in Labour's Plan to Make Work Pay. In particular it postponed the "single worker status" pledge into consultation, and promised only to start a fair pay agreement in adult social care (not all sectors). After the election it reduced its commitments further.

In the act, the rights that were pledged were reduced so that the main provisions of the law included the following:

- a limit to zero hours contracts (ss. 1–8), but with major potential exemptions, particularly for the employment agency industry (Sch 1);
- reduction of the qualifying period for unfair dismissal to 6 months (s. 25 and Sch 3), not to "day one";
- restricting the practice of "fire and rehire" (ss. 29–31), but not banning it in cases where employers argue they are in financial difficulty;
- creating a Fair Work Agency which can enforce certain offences and wrongs, and civil wrongs if workers do not litigate, in the ERA 1996 and TULRCA 1992.

== Background ==
=== UK political history ===
In the United Kingdom, most of the latest major employment laws were passed in the 1980s, and recast in the Employment Rights Act 1996 and Trade Union and Labour Relations (Consolidation) Act 1992. The Conservative governments of Margaret Thatcher and John Major reduced the rights of unions to collectively bargain, restricting industrial action and picketing. The Labour Party led by Neil Kinnock pledged to repeal the Tory laws and replace them with a "Charter of Rights" for workers, such as union representation and secondary picketing. However, Tony Blair scrapped these pledges, promising to keep the law "the most restrictive on trade unions in the Western world". It instead restored only minimal rights such as a national minimum wage, and limited parental leave. When they returned to power after 2010, the Conservatives raised unfair dismissal qualification, imposed fees for Employment Tribunals, and scrapped a public sector equality duty. After the 2015 election, the Conservatives introduced the Trade Union Act 2016 and the Strikes (Minimum Service Levels) Act 2023. These laws introduced further restrictions on trade unions, particularly their finances and their administrative structures, and also enabled the government to set minimum service levels in cases where strike action occurred in key sectors. These laws have been criticised as among the harshest in Europe and the wider developed world and have been credited with leading to a fall in trade union membership and a reduction of workers' rights in the UK since the 1980s.

=== European developments ===
In 2015, the Labour Party shifted back to the left with the election of Jeremy Corbyn as its leader. Under Corbyn, the party pledged to repeal the Trade Union Act 2016 as well as earlier Conservative laws. However, Labour lost the 2017 and 2019 elections. Under a new Boris Johnson government, the UK left the European Union in early 2020. The UK–EU Trade and Accession Agreement committed the UK to not reduce employment rights protection in a way that affected trade, but did not prevent the UK from falling further behind EU labour rights standards. Without the UK's presence, the EU passed the Adequate Minimum Wage Directive 2022 which requires member states to have an action plan to achieve 80% or more coverage in collective bargaining (most countries do so through sector collective bargaining). It also passed the Platform Work Directive 2024 where article 4 requires that worker status is determined according to law, not the terms of contracts (usually written by employers), which is already the situation in UK labour law, as determined by court cases such as Autoclenz Ltd v Belcher [2011] UKSC 41.

=== New Deal for Working People ===
Under a new leadership of Keir Starmer, in 2021 the Labour party launched a green paper, the New Deal for Working People. This provided the framework for a new Employment Rights Bill which the party would introduce if it returned to power. Proposals included the repeal of Conservative anti-trade union legislation, a ban on fire and rehire and zero-hour contracts, the introduction of a single legal status for all workers except for those who are self-employed, and provisions which would enable collective bargaining to settle pay disputes across all economic sectors.

=== Make Work Pay ===
As the 2024 election drew nearer Labour's pledges for the bill under Starmer were reduced in a new "Plan to Make Work Pay", to appear business-friendly. The revamped proposals limited the repeal of anti-trade union legislation to the Strikes (Minimum Service Levels) Act 2023 and most, but not all, of the Trade Union Act 2016, while pledges to ban zero-hour contracts and fire and rehire were replaced with promises to introduce restrictions and a minimum hour guarantee. The single legal status for workers was also removed, while collective bargaining was limited to the adult social care and school support staff sectors. The Plan to Make Work Pay was included in Labour's manifesto for the 2024 general election.

== Parliamentary passage ==
In the King's Speech at the 2024 State Opening of Parliament, it was confirmed that the government would introduce the Employment Rights Bill to Parliament within its first 100 days in office, with revived commitments to ban fire and rehire and "exploitative" zero-hour contracts. Deputy prime minister Angela Rayner was given oversight over the contents of the bill and its implementation, with business secretary Jonathan Reynolds tasked with leading the bill's passage through Parliament.

Reynolds introduced the bill for its first reading in the House of Commons on 10 October 2024, which was followed by the publication of the draft bill and a government white paper, Next Steps to Make Work Pay, which explained the government's plans for the bill and its implementation.

In November 2025, the government had to defend its decision to reduce rather than abolish the qualifying period for a worker to claim that they had been sacked unfairly.

== Contents ==
The government stated that the Employment Rights Bill aimed to modernise industrial relations and strengthen employment law enforcement. Its plan to Make Work Pay was seen as one of the main elements of the government's five missions to grow the economy, by improving productivity and employment. The bill repealed the Strikes (Minimum Service Levels) Act 2023, the Workers (Predictable Terms and Conditions) Act 2023 and most, but not all, of the Trade Union Act 2016. It also amended the Seafarers Wages Act 2023, Procurement Act 2023, Equality Act 2010, Employment Relations Act 1999, Employment Rights Act 1996 and Trade Union and Labour Relations (Consolidation) Act 1992.

=== Hours and pay ===
The main provisions of the Employment Rights Act 2025 on pay and hours include the following:

- a limit to zero hours contracts (ss. 1–8), but with major potential exemptions, particularly for the employment agency industry (Sch 1);
- requiring the employer's reasons for rejecting a right to request flexible work are reasonable (s. 9);
- reforms to statutory sick pay, including making it available from the first day of employment (ss. 10–13);
- new policies on allocating tips (s. 14).

=== Job security ===
The ERA 2025's main provisions on job security are to:

- reduce the qualifying period for unfair dismissal to 6 months (s. 25 and Sch 3), not to "day one";
- restrict the practice of "fire and rehire" (ss. 28–31), but not ban it in cases where employers argue they are in "financial difficulties";
- strengthen provisions for consultation before collective redundancy, including increasing the maximum protective for failure to consult from 90 to 180 days' pay.

=== Equality ===
The ERA 2025's main provisions on equality are to:

- remove the qualifying periods for parental and paternity leave, so they are available like maternity leave from the first day of employment (ss. 15–16), but not changing the disparity between maternity and paternity which is a leading contributor to the gender pay gap;
- require employers take reasonable steps to prevent sexual harassment, make employers liable for harassment by third parties if they fail to take reasonable steps, and protect workers' disclosure of sexual harassment as whistleblowing (ss. 20–24);
- forbid dismissal during pregnancy or in a period after return from statutory family leave (ss. 26–27);
- create duties for employers with over 250 staff (around half the workforce) to publish "equality action plans" to address the gender pay gap, and include outsourced workers in the calculations of the pay gap (ss. 33–34);
- create facility time for equality representatives (s. 65).

=== Collective rights ===
The ERA 2025's main provisions on collective rights are to:

- require a "Fair Pay Agreement" in adult social care (ss. 39–55), and
- restore a "School Support Staff Negotiating Body" (s. 38), but not requiring fair pay agreements in any other sector;
- create a duty on employers to give workers a written statement that they can join a trade union (s. 58), but not saying what is required in the statement until the Secretary of State drafts rules;
- restate a union's right to make an "access agreement" with an employer to publicise the union to workers with appeal to the Central Arbitration Committee in the case of a dispute (s. 59), but not to create an right of access;
- remove the 40% turnout threshold for unions to secure recognition (s. 60 and Sch 6, para 19(3)) but leaving the duty to bargain solely in enterprises (not across sectors), and on 'pay, hours and holidays' rather than all terms;
- restate the power of the Secretary of State to introduce electronic ballots for union elections or industrial action (s. 73, and Employment Relations Act 2004 s. 54) but not actually requiring e-ballots begin;
- make minor updates to the right of workers to not detriment (s. 76), and an employee to not be unfairly dismissed for industrial action (s. 77), but does not extend the right to protection to all workers as international law requires;
- remove any requirement for 50% turnout at strike ballots, ensure ballot authority lasts 12 months, reducing notice of strike action from 2 weeks to 10 days (ss. 68–72 and 74), repealing most of the Trade Union Act 2016, but this is subject to the Secretary of State implementing rules which it still had not done by April 2026
- repeal the Strikes (Minimum Service Levels) Act 2023 (s. 78).

=== Enforcement ===
The ERA 2025's main provisions on enforcement are to:

- create a Fair Work Agency which can enforce a limited range of criminal offences and certain wrongs in statutes designated as "labour market legislation", including the Employment Agencies Act 1973, National Minimum Wage Act 1998, Working Time Regulations 1998, Gangmasters (Licensing) Act 2004 (ss. 90–151 and Sch 7), but not the Employment Rights Act 1996 or the TULRCA 1992;
- enable the Fair Work Agency to enforce tribunal judgments that have been ignored;
- create a power for the Fair Work Agency to bring proceedings for civil cases where it appears a worker will not bring proceedings (s. 116);
- increase the time limits for Employment Tribunal claims to six months for most rights, including in the ERA 1996, TULRCA 1992, and the Equality Act 2010 s. 123 (on discrimination at work, equalising with equal pay claims).

=== Territorial scope ===
The act mainly concerns Great Britain, as employment law is devolved in Northern Ireland. It is structured into six parts. Parts 1 and 2 of the bill mainly apply to Great Britain except for clause 25, which covers public sector outsourcing and also includes Northern Ireland. Part 3 of the bill applies to England and Wales, as it covers collective bargaining for the adult social care and school support staff sectors, which have different processes in Scotland and Northern Ireland. Part 4 on trade union law and industrial action applies to Great Britain, while part 5 on labour market enforcement and part 6 on more general provisions apply to the entire United Kingdom.

== Developments after passage ==
Much of the Employment Rights Act 2025 did not come into effect immediately, despite being enacted on 18 December 2025, but required the Secretary of State to write further rules, which it had not done 17 months after the July 2024 election. Important examples include the need for the Secretary of State to write rules on when a guaranteed hours contract offer has to be made (in place of zero hours contracts), introduce electronic ballots in union votes, remove of the 50% turnout threshold for strike ballots, or the remit of the Fair Work Agency.

In October 2025, the government appointed Matthew Taylor, a former Blair adviser, as CEO of the Fair Work Agency. Taylor had worked for the Conservative government on the "Taylor Review", which maintained the status quo for vulnerable workers. In April 2026, Taylor announced strategic priorities would include "reducing regulatory burdens", leading to scathing criticism from across the labour movement, and among labour experts, who described it as a "dead duck" (Sharon Graham, the general secretary of Unite) and that "employers face 'no credible threat of inspection, investigation or enforcement'" (David Whyte, professor at Queen Mary University and former board member of the Gangmasters Licensing Authority).

== See also ==
- UK labour law

== Bibliography ==
Articles

- Brione, Patrick; Cunningham, Stephanie (23 October 2024). "Employment Rights Bill 2024–25" (PDF). House of Commons Research Briefings. 10109. House of Commons Library.
- Department for Business and Trade (October 2024). "Factsheet: Employment Rights Bill – Overview" (PDF). GOV.UK.
- E McGaughey, 'Employment Rights Bill: briefing on 12 key reforms, recommended amendments, and 3 further policies' (2025) SSRN

Books

- Blackburn, Robert (1999). Towards a Constitutional Bill of Rights for the United Kingdom. Pinter. ISBN 9781855675292.
- Colling, Trevor; Terry, Mike (7 September 2010). Industrial Relations: Theory and Practice. John Wiley & Sons. ISBN 9781444323115.

News stories

- Bloom, Dan; Dawson, Bethany (6 July 2024). "Labour's top priorities". Politico.
- Full Fact Team (8 September 2011). "Does the UK have the toughest laws on strikes in the developed world?". Full Fact.
- The Guardian (5 July 1996). "The changing manifesto". The Guardian.
- Laybourn, Keith (17 August 2022). "UK strikes: how Margaret Thatcher and other leaders cut trade union powers over centuries". The Conversation.
- Leckey, Colin; Tawakley, Tarun (16 January 2025). "Employment Rights Bill unpacked: discrimination law". Lewis Silkin.
- Local Government Lawyer (17 July 2024). "King's Speech 2024: Labour Government sets out legislative agenda, spanning planning reform, new devolution arrangements and data protection changes". Local Government Lawyer.
- House of Commons (2024). Employment Rights Bill (As Introduced) (PDF). Bill 11.
- Merrick, Jane (17 July 2024). "Workers get right to flexible working from their first day". The i Paper.
- Parliament of the United Kingdom (22 September 2025). "Employment Rights Bill". Parliament of the United Kingdom.
- Pigott, Charles (30 October 2025). "Employment Rights Bill: An overview". Mills & Reeve.
- Race, Michael (10 October 2024). "How will the changes to workers' rights affect you?". BBC News.
- Seddon, Paul (29 November 2025). "Minister defends 'pragmatic' U-turn on workers' rights". BBC News. Archived from the original on 9 December 2025.
- Smith, Ben (5 June 2024). "Starmer's labour pledges give 'wiggle room' for UK businesses". Littler.
- Smyth, Chris (17 July 2024). "TUC hails 'statement of intent' as Labour expands the state". The Times.
- Weir, Adrian (21 March 2025). "Employment Rights Bill: is it merely good, can it be made great?". Institute of Employment Rights.
- White, Michael (5 July 1996). "Hard sell on the road to Downing St". The Guardian.
