= Solidarity action =

Action in support of another disputant

Solidarity action (also known as secondary action, a secondary boycott) is an action taken by an uninvolved third party to assist one of the primary parties to a dispute. The most commonly encountered form is industrial action by a trade union in support of a strike initiated by workers in a separate corporation, but often the same enterprise, group of companies, or connected firm. This latter type of action is also known as a solidarity strike, or a sympathy strike. Employers can also participate in solidarity action, for example by blacklisting (refusing to hire) employees who have been dismissed by another employer for having taken industrial action. A consumer boycott – refusal to buy the products of one of the participants (a company or even a state) – is another well-known form of solidarity action.

In Australia, Latvia, Luxembourg, the United States, and the United Kingdom, solidarity industrial action is theoretically illegal, and strikes can only be against the contractual employer. Germany, Italy and Spain have restrictions in place that restrict the circumstances in which solidarity action can take place (see European labour law).

The term secondary action is often used with the intention of distinguishing different types of trade dispute with a worker's direct contractual employer. Thus, while the primary action means the original dispute, a secondary action is industrial action taken against the employer's parent company, its suppliers, financiers, contracting parties, or even other employers in a related industry.

== By country ==
=== Oceania ===
==== Australia ====
In Australia, secondary boycotts are prohibited by the Competition and Consumer Act 2010. In the 1910s, sympathy strikes were sometimes called to extend a strike beyond the bounds of an Australian state to make it eligible for handling by the federal arbitration court.

=== Europe ===
==== Germany ====
Until 2007, secondary action was generally prohibited according to a decision of the Federal Labour Court from 1985, unless it satisfies the multiple criteria:

- no promotion of strikers' own interests;
- direct effect on a party in the primary dispute;
- proportionality and fairness to the objective.

The secondary action was also legal if there is a close relationship between the target in the secondary dispute and the primary dispute, on the premise that in such case the secondary target can influence the primary one.

In 2007, the Federal Labour Court revided its jurisdictional position on secondary action. Secondary action is now generally considered legal unless it is unsuitable, unnecessary or inappropriate in order to support the primary action.

==== Italy ====
Solidarity action is generally a crime per article 505 of the Penal Code. However, the Constitutional Court (Decision No. 123 of 1962), while acknowledging the legitimacy of the section, recognized the lawfulness of secondary strikes if genuine commonality of interest is present. In particular, a solidarity action may be legitimate to protest the dismissal of workers by a company in a particular industry.

==== Latvia ====
Secondary action is illegal, unless its objective is to facilitate a general agreement.

==== The Netherlands ====
In 2014 the high council of the Netherlands ruled that solidarity strikes are in principle legal, when the involved secondary parties are not disproportionately affected.

==== Poland ====
In Polish law the solidarity strike is permitted only for a maximum length of half a day, and only in solidarity with the sectors that themselves do not have the right to strike (e.g. police, military).

==== Spain ====
Secondary action is generally unlawful, however, the Constitutional Court had recognized their legality if there is at least a minimum convergence of interest, as established by courts on a case-by-case basis, between the participants in the primary and secondary strikes.

==== Sweden ====
Solidarity action rights in Sweden are very broad. In particular, there are no requirements for either reasonable proportion between the primary and secondary actions, or a connection to the targeted parties. Moreover, the peace obligation does not apply to the secondary action, the general prohibition of industrial action against a neutral third party is lifted, and permissible actions are not limited to walk-outs (can include boycotts, blockades, etc.).

==== United Kingdom ====
In the United Kingdom, sympathy strikes were outlawed by the Trade Disputes and Trade Unions Act 1927 in the aftermath of the general strike. That was repealed by the Trade Disputes and Trade Unions Act 1946, passed by the postwar Labour Government.

Solidarity action remained legal until 1980, when the government of Margaret Thatcher passed the Employment Act 1980 to restrict it. That was followed by the Employment Act 1990, which outlawed solidarity action entirely. The laws outlawing solidarity strikes remain to this day, as codified by the Trade Union and Labour Relations (Consolidation) Act 1992 (Section 224).

In 2005, union leaders called for the legalization of solidarity strikes in the aftermath of the strike action against the catering company Gategourmet, but Labour ministers stated that they had no intention of repealing the law. British Airways staff walked out in solidarity, however.

=== North America ===
==== United States ====
Secondary boycotting is frequently confused with secondary striking, also a prohibited tactic for labour unions covered by the Taft–Hartley Act. Some legal definitions for secondary boycotting divide it into two different kinds: secondary consumer boycotts according to the above definition of secondary boycotts, and secondary employee boycotts, also defined as a secondary strike.

Because farm laborers in the United States are not covered by the Wagner Act, the United Farm Workers union has legally used solidarity boycotting of grocery store chains to aid to its strikes against California agribusiness and its primary boycotts of California grapes, lettuce and wine. Its secondary boycotts involved asking consumers to stop shopping at a grocery store chain until the chain stopped carrying the boycotted grapes, lettuce, or wine.

==== Canada ====
The Canadian labour board only recognizes actions within the scope of bargaining. As such, solidarity actions are considered illegal under Canadian labour law.

== See also ==
- Boycott, for the related consumer concept
- Longshoremen v. Allied Int'l, Inc.
