= Strikes (Minimum Service Levels) Act 2023 =

Act of the Parliament of the United Kingdom

Strikes (Minimum Service Levels) Act 2023 (Note: Section 6.)
- Act of Parliament
- Parliament of the United Kingdom
- Long title: An Act to make provision about minimum service levels in connection with the taking by trade unions of strike action relating to certain services.
- Citation: 2023 c. 39
- Introduced by: Grant Shapps, Secretary of State for Business, Energy and Industrial Strategy (Commons); Lord Callanan (Lords)
- Territorial extent: England and Wales; Scotland; (Note: Section 4.)}

Dates
- Royal assent: 20 July 2023
- Commencement: 20 July 2023 (Note: Section 5.)
- Repealed: 18 December 2025

Other legislation
- Amends: Trade Union and Labour Relations (Consolidation) Act 1992
- Repealed by: Employment Rights Act 2025

Status: Repealed

History of passage through Parliament

Text of statute as originally enacted

Revised text of statute as amended

The Strikes (Minimum Service Levels) Act 2023 (c. 39) was an act of the Parliament of the United Kingdom affecting UK labour law designed to force trade union workers in England, Scotland and Wales to provide a minimum service during a strike in health, education services, fire and rescue, border security, transport and nuclear decommissioning. The law was criticised as being not in the 2019 Conservative Party manifesto, being a violation of human rights, and being a violation of international law.

The Scottish Government confirmed that it would not enforce the act in Scotland.

The act was repealed in December 2025 by the Employment Rights Act 2025.

== Background ==
The legislation was published on 10 January 2023 by the Department for Business, Energy and Industrial Strategy and introduced into Parliament by the Conservative Secretary of State for Business, Grant Shapps. It followed a prolonged period of industrial action in the United Kingdom during 2022 and 2023, and was the second piece of legislation seeking to secure a minimum service after legislation covering the transport sector was introduced in October 2022. Launching the bill, Shapps said that the hope was to reach an agreement on the minimum level of service "that mean that we don't have to use that power in the bill". The proposals drew criticism from Paul Nowak, the General Secretary of the Trades Union Congress, who said that it would "prolong disputes and poison industrial relations – leading to more frequent strikes", while unions threatened to take legal action against the government if the legislation was signed into law. The Labour Party said that it would repeal the legislation if it were to be passed. The bill has frequently been referred to as an anti-strike bill or anti-strike law.

== Provisions ==
The act sought to expand the guarantee of a minimum service to the National Health Service, education, fire and rescue, border security, and nuclear decommissioning. It allowed employers to issue a "work notice" stating who should work in the event of a strike, with no automatic protection against unfair dismissal for those who refused. The legislation allowed the Business Secretary "to make regulations providing for levels of service where there are strikes in relevant services".

Minimum service levels were not defined in the bill, but were left to the discretion of the minister.

If unions did not provide minimum service levels during a strike, then the union lost immunity from being sued in tort for damages to the employer for economic loss, and workers lost protection from unfair dismissal.

== Passage through Parliament ==
On 16 January 2023, MPs voted 309–249 in favour of the bill following its first reading. It then moved to the committee stage.

On 30 January, MPs voted 315–246 in favour of the bill, which was then sent to the House of Lords for further debate.

On 20 July, the bill was agreed to by both houses of Parliament and received royal assent.

== Minimum service regulations ==
The precise meaning of 'minimum service level' in regards to a particular category of service was not defined in the act; it was left to the relevant Secretary of State to make 'minimum service regulations' detailing the specific levels of service required. The following minimum service regulations were made under the act:

- The Strikes (Minimum Service Levels: Passenger Railway Services) Regulations 2023 (SI 2023/1335) in relation to transport services,
- The Strikes (Minimum Service Levels: NHS Ambulance Services and the NHS Patient Transport Service) Regulations 2023 (SI 2023/1343) in relation to health services,
- The Strikes (Minimum Service Levels: Border Security) Regulations 2023 (SI 2023/1353) in relation to border security services,
- The Strikes (Minimum Service Levels: Fire and Rescue Services) (England) Regulations 2024 (SI 2024/417) in relation to fire and rescue services.

== Response ==
=== Politicians ===
After the bill gained royal assent, Business Minister Kevin Hollinrake said that the law represented "an appropriate balance between the ability to strike, and protecting lives and livelihoods". Rail Minister Huw Merriman said that the act would "help give passengers certainty that they will be able to make important journeys on a strike day".

Labour leader Keir Starmer said in January 2023 that a Labour government would repeal the legislation. The Employment Rights Bill was introduced to the House of Commons on 10 October 2024, wherein clause 61(3) repealed the Act. This became section 78(3) in the final act.

The Socialist Party called the legislation "a serious attack on the right to strike" which would "[force] unions to organise their own strike-breaking operations".

The law did not apply to Northern Ireland, prompting Conservative MP Robert Buckland to call for it to do so ahead of a one-day strike planned across several sectors in Northern Ireland on 18 January 2024.

=== Employers ===
Following the announcement that the train drivers' union, ASLEF, would commence a series of rolling strikes in February 2024, it emerged that the train operators involved would not use the powers given to them under the legislation to enforce a 40% minimum service during strike days. 10 Downing Street expressed its disappointment that the legislation would not be utilised.

=== Unions ===
Mick Lynch, general secretary of the RMT, said in a speech to the Trades Union Congress (TUC) congress that "meek compliance with this legislation is the road to oblivion for this movement", supporting union non-compliance. Matt Wrack, general secretary of the FBU, wrote in a Tribune article that the bill would "effectively abolish the right to strike", compared it to the anti-union Industrial Relations Act 1971, and called for "a cross-union campaign of non-compliance" to defeat the legislation. In September 2023, TUC delegates voted unanimously to oppose the legislation "up to and including a strategy of non-compliance".

Daniel Kebede, general secretary of the National Education Union (NEU), said the union would strike to force closures at any schools that sacked NEU members under the legislation. Jo Grady, general secretary of the University and College Union, called the legislation "a spiteful attack on workers everywhere".

Oxford University Student Union released a statement opposing the act and any attempts to enforce minimum service levels by Oxford University.

=== Other organisations ===
A Socialist Worker editorial said that unions "did not do enough to resist the bill" and called on workers to "be ready to defy anti-union laws – and defy union leaders too if required".

== See also ==
- UK labour law
