= Colchester Corporation Tramways =

Tramway operator in England

Coordinates: 51.8855°N 0.9068°E

Overview
- Headquarters: Colchester
- Locale: England
- Dates of operation: 1904–1929
- Successor: Abandoned

Technical
- Track gauge: 3 ft 6 in (1,067 mm)
- Length: 5.74 miles (9.24 km)

Colchester Corporation Tramways served the town of Colchester in Essex from 28 July 1904 until 8 December 1929.

== History ==
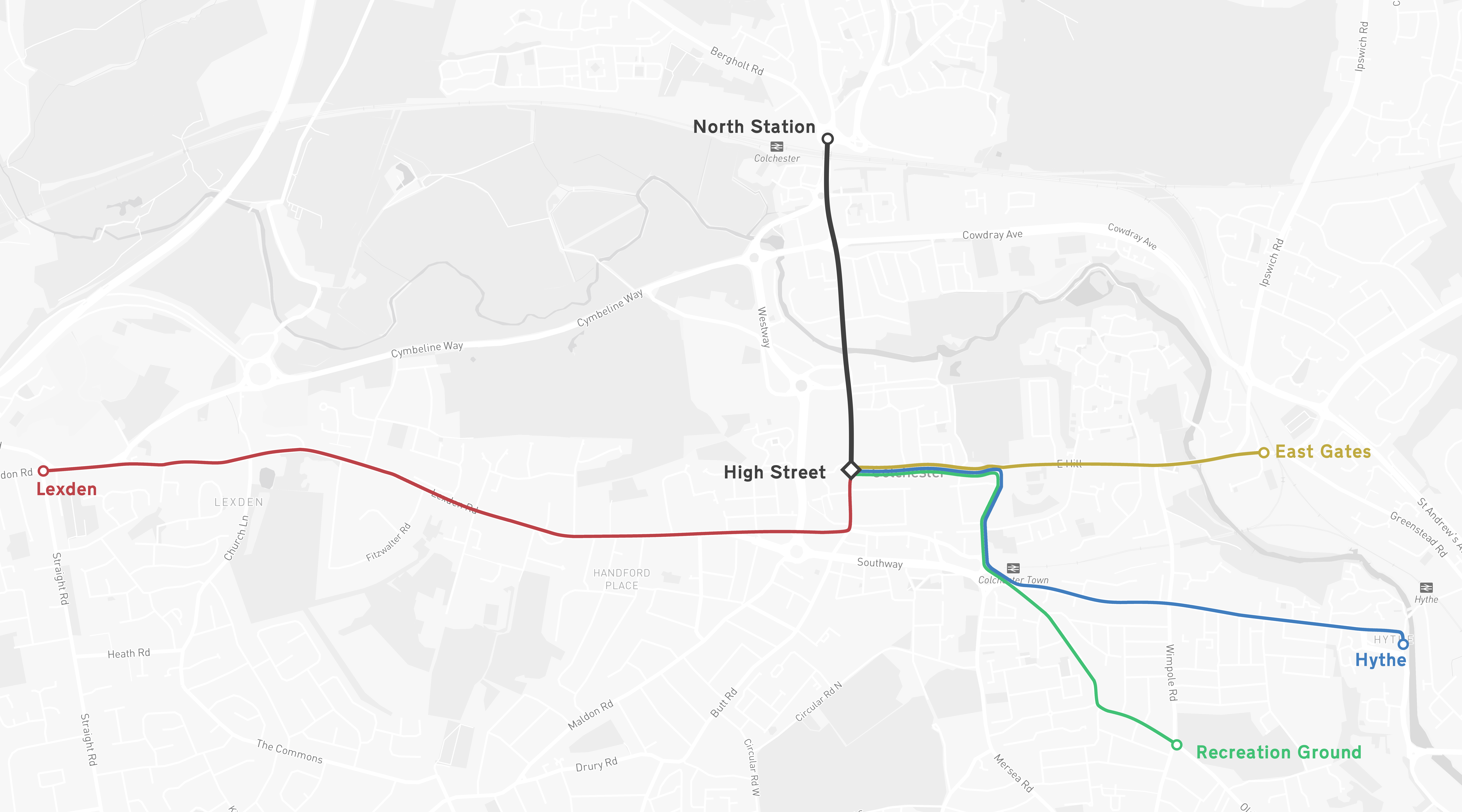
Map of Colchester tramways

In 1901, Colchester Corporation authorised the construction of 5 3/4 miles (9.3 km) of track, but the actual building of the 3 ft 6 in (1.07 m) gauge track did not begin until 1904. A special depot was built at Magdalen Street, just south of the Town Centre, for the 16 brand-new, open-top, double-decker trams, numbered 1 to 16. The trams were manufactured by the Electric Railway and Tramway Carriage Works of Preston on Brill 21E trucks. On 28 July 1904, the trams commenced operation.

The brand new tram system consisted of three routes, all beginning at the North Station, at that time called the North Street Station. The first was to Lexden, a suburb to the west of the Town Centre via North Station Road, North Hill, Head Street then Lexden Road and Lexden Street. Up to Lexden Road, not inclusive, the route was double-tracked, from Lexden Road onwards it was single-track. The second route led to the River Colne on East Street via the double-tracked section up to the High Street, then via a double-tracked section through the High Street and onto a single-tracked section through East Hill to East Street. The third route was to Hythe, to the east of the Town Centre, via the double-tracked sections up to East Hill, where it turned onto another double-tracked section through Queen Street and St. Botolph's Street, where it became a single-track all the way to Hythe.

On 28 June 1906 another extension opened from St. Botolph's Station to the Recreation Ground via Military Road, completing the Colchester tram system.

== Infrastructure ==
Electrical power was obtained from Colchester Corporation's power station in Osborne Street, and the depot with its tram shed was on the south side of Magdalen Street at TM 00138 24762.

The radial system was centred on the High Street and Town Hall at TL 99586 25210. Routes were:

- Queen Street, St Botolph's Street, Military Road - to a terminus just past the junction with Wimpole Road at TM 00657 24232. (Recreation Ground)
- Queen Street, St Botolph's Street, Magdalen Street, Barrack Street, Hythe Hill to a terminus at TM 0148 2465. (Hythe)
- East Hill, East Street to a terminus just west of the railway crossing at TM 00959 25335. (East Gates)
- North Hill, North Station Road to a terminus just through the railway bridge at TL 99263 26425 adjacent to Colchester railway station. (North Station)
- Head Street, Crouch Street, Lexden Road, Lexden Hill, Lexden Street to a terminus at the junction with Straight Road at TL 96383 25089. (Lexden)

== Tramcars ==
The fleet, in a livery of maroon/dark brown and cream, consisted of:

- 18 open top double deck tramcars (manufactured by the Electric Railway and Tramway Carriage Works, later renamed the United Electric Car Company)

== Closure ==
Colchester Corporation Act 1927
- Act of Parliament
- Parliament of the United Kingdom
- Long title: An Act to empower the mayor aldermen and burgesses of the borough of Colchester to provide and work trolley vehicles and omnibuses and for other purposes.
- Citation: 17 & 18 Geo. 5. c. lxxxiv

Dates
- Royal assent: 29 July 1927

Other legislation
- Repealed by: Essex Act 1987

Status: Repealed

Text of statute as originally enacted

By 1927 there was not enough funding for the refurbishment and replacement of trams. The Colchester Corporation Act 1927 (17 & 18 Geo. 5. c. lxxxiv) allowed for the replacement of trams with motorbuses.

The first motorbus commenced operation on 21 May 1928, to replace the trams between North Station and East Street. On 9 December 1929, the final tram service between North Station and Recreational Ground closed, and was replaced the next day by a bus service.

== See also ==
List of town tramway systems in the United Kingdom
