= Luce v Bexley LBC =

- Court: Employment Appeal Tribunal
- Citation: [1990] ICR 591 (EAT)

Keywords
- Trade union, collective bargaining

Luce v Bexley LBC [1990] ICR 591 (EAT) is a UK labour law case, concerning collective bargaining.

== Facts ==
Bexley London Borough Council refused permission to six teachers to attend a lobby on Parliament organised by the TUC over proposed Conservative legislation. They claimed this breached their right to time off for union activities under (what is now) TULRCA 1992 section 170.

== Judgment ==
Wood J held the phrase ‘any activities of an appropriate trade union of which the employee is a member’ must be given a meaning that is within ‘the ambit of the employment relationship’ in other words ‘between that employer, that employee and that trade union’. Because this lobby concerned political organisation, time off did not need to be granted. The activity went beyond the ambit.
