= Ecclestone v National Union of Journalists =

UK case on trade union regulation

- Court: High Court
- Citation: [1999] IRLR 166

Keywords
- Trade union, collective bargaining

Ecclestone v National Union of Journalists [1999] IRLR 166 is a UK labour law case, concerning trade union regulation.

== Facts ==
Mr Jake Ecclestone was the NUJ Deputy General Secretary. There was a dispute and the executive committee passed a motion of no confidence and dismissed him. He wanted to run again, but he was not accepted because he did not have the NEC's confidence. The National Executive Committee stated at the last minute that this would be a qualification for office, although that did not appear in the rules, nor in a resolution by the Annual Delegate Meeting. Mr Ecclestone argued this breached TULRCA 1992 section 47.

Mr Hendy argued that although the NEC changed the rules at the last minute, this was an obviously reasonable requirement. Mr Jeans was argued against.

== Judgment ==
Smith J held that the NEC's extra requirement was unlawful at common law and under statute. He described the union structure as having NEC members elected according to geography in Britain and Europe. The Annual Delegate Meeting makes rules and policy, and its decisions can overrule the NEC, albeit that the NEC would administer things day to day. He recited the rules and observed that none of them contained the qualification of NEC confidence in running for office. Because it was something done hastily and at the last minute, it was not clear and prospective, and could not therefore be adopted compatibly with the democratic nature of the union. So it was unlawful at common law. The action was also unlawful under TULRCA 1992 section 47, because that precludes unreasonable or unfair criteria and NEC confidence is an ‘essentially subjective method’.

The union is a democratic organisation.

[...]

The actions of this NEC fell outside the scope of the discretion provided by the rules because they did not act in accordance with good employment practice.

== See also ==
- UK labour law
