= Trade Disputes and Trade Unions Act 1927 =

Act of the Parliament of the United Kingdom

Trade Disputes and Trade Unions Act 1927 (Note: Section 8(1).)
- Act of Parliament
- Parliament of the United Kingdom
- Long title: An Act to declare and amend the law relating to trade disputes and trade unions; to regulate the position of civil servants and persons employed by public authorities in respect of membership of trade unions and similar organisations; to extend section five of the Conspiracy and Protection of Property Act 1875; and for other purposes connected with the purposes aforesaid.
- Citation: 17 & 18 Geo. 5. c. 22
- Introduced by: Sir Douglas Hogg (Commons)
- Territorial extent: England and Wales; Scotland; (Note: Section 8(3).)

Dates
- Royal assent: 29 July 1927
- Commencement: 29 July 1927 (Note: The Acts of Parliament (Commencement) Act 1793.)
- Repealed: 22 May 1946
Other legislation
| Repealed by | Trade Disputes and Trade Unions Act 1946 |
| Relates to | Conspiracy, and Protection of Property Act 1875; Trade Disputes Act 1906; Trade Union Act 1913 |

Status: Repealed

Text of statute as originally enacted

The Trade Disputes and Trade Unions Act 1927 (17 & 18 Geo. 5. c. 22) was an act of the Parliament of the United Kingdom passed in response to the General Strike of 1926, introduced by the Attorney General for England and Wales, Sir Douglas Hogg MP.

== Provisions ==
=== Restrictions on strike action ===
The act declared unlawful secondary action and any strike whose purpose was to coerce the government of the day directly or indirectly. These provisions were declaratory insofar as such strikes had already been ruled unlawful by Astbury, J in the National Sailors' and Firemen's Union v Reed. The act reaffirmed his judgment and gave it the force of statute law. In addition, incitement to participate in an unlawful strike was made a criminal offence, punishable by imprisonment for up to two years; and the attorney general was empowered to sequester the assets and funds of unions involved in such strikes.

=== Intimidation ===
Section 3 of the act declared unlawful mass picketing which gave rise to the intimidation of a worker.

=== Political levy ===
Section 4 of the act mandated trade union members to contract-in to any political levy which their union made on their behalf. This resulted in an 18% fall in the income of the Labour Party, which was heavily reliant upon union funding.

=== Civil service unions ===
Section 5 of the act enjoined civil service unions from affiliation to the TUC and forbade them from having political objectives.

== Repeal ==
The act was particularly resented by the trade union movement and the Labour Party. Indeed, one Labour MP described it as "a vindictive Act, and one of the most spiteful measures that was ever placed upon the Statute Book". The second minority Labour government introduced a bill to repeal various provisions of the act in 1931 which was not passed. The act was eventually repealed by section 1 of the Trade Disputes and Trade Unions Act 1946.

Following the election of Margaret Thatcher, the Conservative Party reintroduced their ban on secondary action, first with restrictions in the Employment Act 1980 and finally banning it altogether in the Employment Act 1990. This is now codified in the Trade Union and Labour Relations (Consolidation) Act 1992.

== See also ==
- United Kingdom labour law
- Amalgamated Society of Railway Servants v Osborne [1910] AC 87
- Trade Union Act 1913
- Trade Disputes and Trade Unions Act 1946
- Trade Union and Labour Relations (Consolidation) Act 1992 s 82
