= List of acts of the Parliament of the United Kingdom from 1927 =

This is a complete list of acts of the Parliament of the United Kingdom for the year 1927.

Note that the first parliament of the United Kingdom was held in 1801; parliaments between 1707 and 1800 were either parliaments of Great Britain or of Ireland). For acts passed up until 1707, see the list of acts of the Parliament of England and the list of acts of the Parliament of Scotland. For acts passed from 1707 to 1800, see the list of acts of the Parliament of Great Britain. See also the list of acts of the Parliament of Ireland.

For acts of the devolved parliaments and assemblies in the United Kingdom, see the list of acts of the Scottish Parliament, the list of acts of the Northern Ireland Assembly, and the list of acts and measures of Senedd Cymru; see also the list of acts of the Parliament of Northern Ireland.

The number shown after each act's title is its chapter number. Acts passed before 1963 are cited using this number, preceded by the year(s) of the reign during which the relevant parliamentary session was held; thus the Union with Ireland Act 1800 is cited as "39 & 40 Geo. 3 c. 67", meaning the 67th act passed during the session that started in the 39th year of the reign of George III and which finished in the 40th year of that reign. Note that the modern convention is to use Arabic numerals in citations (thus "41 Geo. 3" rather than "41 Geo. III"). Acts of the last session of the Parliament of Great Britain and the first session of the Parliament of the United Kingdom are both cited as "41 Geo. 3". Acts passed from 1963 onwards are simply cited by calendar year and chapter number.

== 17 & 18 Geo. 5 ==
The third session of the 34th Parliament of the United Kingdom, which met from 8 February 1927 until 22 December 1927.

This session was also traditionally cited as 17 & 18 G. 5.

=== Public general acts ===
Short title	Citation	Royal assent
Long title
Public Works Loans Act 1927 (repealed)	17 & 18 Geo. 5. c. 1	11 March 1927
An Act to grant money for the purpose of certain local loans out of the Local Loans Fund; and for other purposes relating to local loans. (Repealed by Eire (Confirmation of Agreements) Act 1938 (1 & 2 Geo. 6. c. 25) and Statute Law Revision Act 1950 (14 Geo. 6. c. 6))
Consolidated Fund (No. 1) Act 1927 (repealed)	17 & 18 Geo. 5. c. 2	29 March 1927
An Act to apply certain sums out of the Consolidated Fund to the service of the years ending on the thirty-first day of March, one thousand nine hundred and twenty-six, one thousand nine hundred and twenty-seven, and one thousand nine hundred and twenty-eight. (Repealed by Statute Law Revision Act 1950 (14 Geo. 6. c. 6))
Poor Law Emergency Provisions (Scotland) Act 1927 (repealed)	17 & 18 Geo. 5. c. 3	29 March 1927
An Act to make provision as to poor relief to dependants of persons involved in a trade dispute in Scotland, to enable relief to be given by way of loan, and to extend further the duration of the Poor Law Emergency Provisions (Scotland) Act, 1921, (Note: Poor Law Emergency Provisions (Scotland) Act 1921 (11 & 12 Geo. 5. c. 64)) as amended by subsequent Acts. (Repealed by National Assistance Act 1948 (11 & 12 Geo. 6. c. 29))
Royal and Parliamentary Titles Act 1927	17 & 18 Geo. 5. c. 4	12 April 1927
An Act to provide for the alteration of the Royal Style and Titles and of the Style of Parliament and for purposes incidental thereto.
Sale of Food and Drugs Act 1927 (repealed)	17 & 18 Geo. 5. c. 5	12 April 1927
An Act to amend the Sale of Food and Drugs Acts, 1875 to 1907. (Repealed by Food and Drugs (Adulteration) Act 1928 (18 & 19 Geo. 5. c. 31))
Forestry Act 1927 (repealed)	17 & 18 Geo. 5. c. 6	12 April 1927
An Act to authorise an increase of the number of Forestry Commissioners; to empower the Commissioners to make byelaws with respect to land vested in them or under their management or control; and for purposes consequential upon the matters aforesaid. (Repealed by Forestry Act 1967 (c. 10))
Army and Air Force (Annual) Act 1927 (repealed)	17 & 18 Geo. 5. c. 7	12 April 1927
An Act to provide, during Twelve Months, for the Discipline and Regulation of the Army and Air Force. (Repealed by Statute Law Revision Act 1950 (14 Geo. 6. c. 6) and Revision of the Army and Air Force Acts (Transitional Provisions) Act 1955 (3 & 4 Eliz. 2. c. 20))
Government of India (Indian Navy) Act 1927 (repealed)	17 & 18 Geo. 5. c. 8	29 June 1927
An Act to amend the Government of India Act (Note: Government of India Act 1919 (9 & 10 Geo. 5. c. 101)) with a view to facilitating the provision of an Indian Navy, and to make consequential amendments in the Naval Discipline Act. (Note: Naval Discipline Act 1866 (29 & 30 Vict. c. 109)) (Repealed by Government of India Act 1935 (26 Geo. 5 & 1 Edw. 8. c. 2) and Statute Law Revision Act 1950 (14 Geo. 6. c. 6))
Pacific Cable Act 1927 (repealed)	17 & 18 Geo. 5. c. 9	29 June 1927
An Act to consolidate with amendments the Pacific Cable Acts, 1901 to 1924. (Repealed by Imperial Telegraphs Act 1929 (19 & 20 Geo. 5. c. 7))
Finance Act 1927	17 & 18 Geo. 5. c. 10	29 July 1927
An Act to grant certain duties of Customs and Inland Revenue (including Excise), to alter other duties, and to amend the law relating to Customs and Inland Revenue (including Excise) and the National Debt, and to make further provision in connection with finance.
Appropriation Act 1927 (repealed)	17 & 18 Geo. 5. c. 11	29 July 1927
An Act to apply a sum out of the Consolidated Fund to the service of the year ending on the thirty-first day of March, one thousand nine hundred and twenty-eight, and to appropriate the Supplies granted in this Session of Parliament. (Repealed by Statute Law Revision Act 1950 (14 Geo. 6. c. 6))
Auctions (Bidding Agreements) Act 1927	17 & 18 Geo. 5. c. 12	29 July 1927
An Act to render illegal certain agreements and transactions affecting bidding at auctions.
Diseases of Animals Act 1927 (repealed)	17 & 18 Geo. 5. c. 13	29 July 1927
An Act to amend the Disease of Animals Acts, 1894 to 1925. (Repealed by Diseases of Animals Act 1950 (14 Geo. 6. c. 36))
Poor Law Act 1927 (repealed)	17 & 18 Geo. 5. c. 14	29 July 1927
An Act to consolidate the enactments relating to the Relief of the Poor in England and Wales. (Repealed by Local Government Act 1929 (19 & 20 Geo. 5. c. 17), Poor Law Act 1930 (20 & 21 Geo. 5. c. 17), Local Government Act 1933 (23 & 24 Geo. 5. c. 51) and London Government Act 1939 (2 & 3 Geo. 6. c. 40))
Workmen's Compensation (Transfer of Funds) Act 1927 (repealed)	17 & 18 Geo. 5. c. 15	29 July 1927
An Act to make such amendments of the Workmen's Compensation Act, 1925, (Note: Workmen's Compensation Act 1925 (15 & 16 Geo. 5. c. 84)) as are necessary to give effect to a certain resolution adopted by an Imperial Conference held in London in the year nineteen hundred and twenty-six. (Repealed by Statute Law (Repeals) Act 1989 (c. 43))
Land Tax Commissioners Act 1927 (repealed)	17 & 18 Geo. 5. c. 16	29 July 1927
An Act to appoint additional commissioners for executing the Acts granting a land tax and other rates and taxes. (Repealed by Statute Law Revision Act 1950 (14 Geo. 6. c. 6))
Midwives and Maternity Homes (Scotland) Act 1927 (repealed)	17 & 18 Geo. 5. c. 17	29 July 1927
An Act to amend the Midwives (Scotland) Act, 1915, (Note: Midwives (Scotland) Act 1915 (5 & 6 Geo. 5. c. 91)) and to provide for the registration and inspection of maternity homes, and for purposes connected therewith. (Repealed by Midwives (Scotland) Act 1951 (14 & 15 Geo. 6. c. 54))
Royal Naval Reserve Act 1927 (repealed)	17 & 18 Geo. 5. c. 18	29 July 1927
An Act to amend the enactments relating to the Naval Reserve Forces. (Repealed by Reserve Forces Act 1980 (c. 9))
Police (Appeals) Act 1927 (repealed)	17 & 18 Geo. 5. c. 19	29 July 1927
An Act to provide for a right of appeal by members of police forces who are dismissed or required to resign. (Repealed by Police Act 1964 (c. 48))
Isle of Man (Customs) Act 1927 (repealed)	17 & 18 Geo. 5. c. 20	29 July 1927
An Act to amend the law with respect to customs in the Isle of Man. (Repealed for the Isle of Man by Customs and Excise etc. Order 1976 (GC No 1/76))
Moneylenders Act 1927 (repealed)	17 & 18 Geo. 5. c. 21	29 July 1927
An Act to amend the Law with respect to persons carrying on business as Moneylenders. (Repealed by Consumer Credit Act 1974 (c. 39))
Trade Disputes and Trade Unions Act 1927 (repealed)	17 & 18 Geo. 5. c. 22	29 July 1927
An Act to declare and amend the law relating to trade disputes and trade unions, to regulate the position of civil servants and persons employed by public authorities in respect of membership of trade unions and similar organisations, to extend section five of the Conspiracy, and Protection of Property Act, 1875, and for other purposes connected with the purposes aforesaid. (Repealed by Trade Disputes and Trade Unions Act 1946 (9 & 10 Geo. 6. c. 52))
Crown Lands Act 1927	17 & 18 Geo. 5. c. 23	29 July 1927
An Act to incorporate the Commissioners of Crown Lands; to amend the Law relating to the powers and duties of the said Commissioners in respect of the possessions and land revenues of the Crown under their management; to provide for the transfer to the Gloucester Diocesan Board of Finance of certain moneys held by the said Commissioners for ecclesiastical purposes in that diocese; and for purposes connected with the matters aforesaid.
Government of India (Statutory Commission) Act 1927 (repealed)	17 & 18 Geo. 5. c. 24	23 November 1927
An Act to amend section 84A of the Government of India Act with respect to the time for the appointment of a Statutory Commission thereunder. (Repealed by Government of India Act 1935 (26 Geo. 5 & 1 Edw. 8. c. 2))
Appropriation (No. 2) Act 1927 (repealed)	17 & 18 Geo. 5. c. 25	22 December 1927
An Act to apply a sum out of the Consolidated Fund to the service of the year ending on the thirty-first day of March, one thousand nine hundred and twenty-eight, and to appropriate the further Supplies granted in this Session of Parliament. (Repealed by Statute Law Revision Act 1950 (14 Geo. 6. c. 6))
Criminal Appeal (Scotland) Act 1927 (repealed)	17 & 18 Geo. 5. c. 26	22 December 1927
An Act to amend the provisions of the Criminal Appeal (Scotland) Act, 1926, (Note: Criminal Appeal (Scotland) Act 1926 (16 & 17 Geo. 5. c. 15)) with regard to the power of the Secretary of State to refer a case, or any point arising therein, to the High Court of Justiciary. (Repealed by Statute Law (Repeals) Act 1977 (c. 18))
Protection of Animals (Amendment) Act 1927	17 & 18 Geo. 5. c. 27	22 December 1927
An Act to amend the Protection of Animals Act, 1911. (Note: Protection of Animals Act 1911 (1 & 2 Geo. 5. c. 27))
Public Works Loans (No. 2) Act 1927 (repealed)	17 & 18 Geo. 5. c. 28	22 December 1927
An Act to grant money for the purpose of certain local loans out of the Local Loans Fund. (Repealed by Statute Law Revision Act 1950 (14 Geo. 6. c. 6))
Cinematograph Films Act 1927 (repealed)	17 & 18 Geo. 5. c. 29	22 December 1927
An Act to restrict blind booking and advance booking of cinematograph films, and to secure the renting and exhibition of a certain proportion of British films, and for purposes connected therewith. (Repealed by Cinematograph Films Act 1948 (11 & 12 Geo. 6. c. 23))
Unemployment Insurance Act 1927 (repealed)	17 & 18 Geo. 5. c. 30	22 December 1927
An Act to amend the Unemployment Insurance Acts, 1920 to 1926. (Repealed by Unemployment Insurance Act 1935 (25 & 26 Geo. 5. c. 8))
Audit (Local Authorities) Act 1927 (repealed)	17 & 18 Geo. 5. c. 31	22 December 1927
An Act to amend the law with respect to the effect of surcharges by district auditors, appeals from decisions of district auditors, and the recovery of sums certified to be due by district auditors. (Repealed by Local Government Act 1933 (23 & 24 Geo. 5. c. 51) and London Government Act 1939 (2 & 3 Geo. 6. c. 40))
Destructive Insects and Pests Act 1927 (repealed)	17 & 18 Geo. 5. c. 32	22 December 1927
An Act to amend the Destructive Insects and Pests Acts, 1877 (Note: Destructive Insects Act 1877 (40 & 41 Vict. c. 68)) and 1907. (Note: Destructive Insects and Pests Act 1907 (7 Edw. 7. c. 4)) (Repealed by Plant Health Act 1967 (c. 8))
Mental Deficiency Act 1927 (repealed)	17 & 18 Geo. 5. c. 33	22 December 1927
An Act to amend certain enactments relating to mental defectives. (Repealed by Mental Health Act 1959 (7 & 8 Eliz. 2. c. 72))
Expiring Laws Continuance Act 1927 (repealed)	17 & 18 Geo. 5. c. 34	22 December 1927
An Act to continue certain expiring laws. (Repealed by Statute Law Revision Act 1950 (14 Geo. 6. c. 6))
Sheriff Courts and Legal Officers (Scotland) Act 1927	17 & 18 Geo. 5. c. 35	22 December 1927
An Act to amend the law relating to the offices of Sheriff Clerk, Procurator Fiscal, and Commissary Clerk in Scotland, and to make further provision regarding Sheriff Courts.
Landlord and Tenant Act 1927	17 & 18 Geo. 5. c. 36	22 December 1927
An Act to provide for the payment of compensation for improvements and goodwill to tenants of premises used for business purposes, or the grant of a new lease in lieu thereof; and to amend the law of landlord and tenant.
Road Transport Lighting Act 1927 (repealed)	17 & 18 Geo. 5. c. 37	22 December 1927
An Act to regulate further the lighting of vehicles. (Repealed by Road Transport Lighting Act 1957 (5 & 6 Eliz. 2. c. 51))
Nursing Homes Registration Act 1927 (repealed)	17 & 18 Geo. 5. c. 38	22 December 1927
An Act to provide for the registration and inspection of nursing homes, and for purposes connected therewith. (Repealed by Public Health Act 1936 (26 Geo. 5 & 1 Edw. 8. c. 49) and Public Health (London) Act 1936 (26 Geo. 5 & 1 Edw. 8. c. 50))
Medical and Dentists Acts Amendment Act 1927 (repealed)	17 & 18 Geo. 5. c. 39	22 December 1927
An Act to confirm and give effect to certain agreements between representatives of Great Britain, the Irish Free State and Northern Ireland as to the registration and control of medical practitioners, and dentists, and to validate certain acts done by the Dental Board. (Repealed by Irish Republic (Termination of 1927 Agreement) Order 1987 (SI 1987/2047))
Indian Church Act 1927 (repealed)	17 & 18 Geo. 5. c. 40	22 December 1927
An Act to make provision incidental to and consequential on the dissolution of the legal union between the Church of England and the Church of England in India. (Repealed by Statute Law (Repeals) Act 1976 (c. 16))
Superannuation and other Trust Funds (Validation) Act 1927	17 & 18 Geo. 5. c. 41	22 December 1927
An Act to amend the law relating to perpetuities and accumulations, as respects certain benefit funds and as respects trust funds for the reduction of the National Debt.
Statute Law Revision Act 1927 (repealed)	17 & 18 Geo. 5. c. 42	22 December 1927
An Act for further promoting the Revision of the Statute Law by repealing Enactments which have ceased to be in force or have become unnecessary. (Repealed by Statute Law (Repeals) Act 1993 (c. 50))
Colonial Probates (Protected States and Mandated Territories) Act 1927	17 & 18 Geo. 5. c. 43	22 December 1927
An Act to enable the Colonial Probates Act, 1892, (Note: Colonial Probates Act 1892 (55 & 56 Vict. c. 6)) to be applied to certain Protected States and Mandated Territories.

=== Local acts ===
Short title	Citation	Royal assent
Long title
Montrose Burgh and Harbour Order Confirmation Act 1927 (repealed)	17 & 18 Geo. 5. c. i	29 March 1927
An Act to confirm a Provisional Order under the Private Legislation Procedure (Scotland) Act 1899 (Note: Private Legislation Procedure (Scotland) Act 1899 (62 & 63 Vict. c. 47)) relating to Montrose Burgh and Harbour. (Repealed by Margate Pier and Harbour Revision Order 1992 (SI 1993/1313))
	Montrose Burgh and Harbour Order 1927 Provisional Order to authorise the provost magistrates and councillors of the burgh of Montrose to levy a special rate in respect of Montrose Harbour and for other purposes.	
Nar Valley Drainage Act 1927	17 & 18 Geo. 5. c. ii	12 April 1927
An Act to extend the period for repayment of moneys borrowed by and to confer new borrowing powers on the Nar Valley Drainage Board and for other purposes.
Yeadon Waterworks Act 1927 (repealed)	17 & 18 Geo. 5. c. iii	12 April 1927
An Act to extend the time limited for the completion of certain works to confer further powers on the Yeadon Waterworks Company and for other purposes. (Repealed by West Yorkshire Act 1980 (c. xiv))
Tyne Improvement Act 1927 (repealed)	17 & 18 Geo. 5. c. iv	12 April 1927
An Act to increase the number of and amend the Acts relating to the Tyne Improvement Commissioners. (Repealed by Port of Tyne Reorganisation Scheme 1967 Confirmation Order 1968 (SI 1968/942))
Great Indian Peninsula Railway Annuities Act 1927 (repealed)	17 & 18 Geo. 5. c. v	29 June 1927
An Act to amend the Great Indian Peninsula Railway Purchase Act 1900 (Note: Great Indian Peninsula Railway Purchase Act 1900 (63 & 64 Vict. c. cxxxviii)) and for other purposes. (Repealed by Statute Law (Repeals) Act 2013 (c. 2))
Reading Gas Act 1927	17 & 18 Geo. 5. c. vi	29 June 1927
An Act to empower the Reading Gas Company to acquire land for the construction of additional gasworks for the storage of gas and to store gas thereon to raise additional capital and for other purposes.
Farnham Gas and Electricity Act 1927	17 & 18 Geo. 5. c. vii	29 June 1927
An Act to empower the Farnham Gas and Electricity Company to raise further moneys to confer additional powers upon that company and for other purposes.
Chelsea Borough Council (Superannuation and Pensions) Act 1927 (repealed)	17 & 18 Geo. 5. c. viii	29 June 1927
An Act to amend the Chelsea Borough Council (Superannuation and Pensions) Act 1914 (Note: Chelsea Borough Council (Superannuation and Pensions) Act 1914 (4 & 5 Geo. 5. c. xii)) and for other purposes. (Repealed by Local Law (Greater London Council and Inner London Boroughs) Order 1965 (SI 1965/540))
Commercial Gas Act 1927	17 & 18 Geo. 5. c. ix	29 June 1927
An Act to make new provision as to the charges for the gas supplied by and the application of the profits of the Commercial Gas Company and for other purposes.
Great Western Railway Act 1927	17 & 18 Geo. 5. c. x	29 June 1927
An Act for conferring further powers upon the Great Western Railway Company and for other purposes.
Southern Railway (Superannuation Fund) Act 1927	17 & 18 Geo. 5. c. xi	29 June 1927
An Act to establish a superannuation fund for the salaried officers of the Southern Railway Company, and for other purposes.
Frimley and Farnborough District Water Act 1927	17 & 18 Geo. 5. c. xii	29 June 1927
An Act to empower the Frimley and Farnborough District Water Company to construct further works and to borrow moneys to authorise a profit-sharing scheme for the employees of the Company to confer additional powers upon the Company and for other purposes.
Bury Corporation Act 1927	17 & 18 Geo. 5. c. xiii	29 June 1927
An Act to confer further powers upon the mayor aldermen and burgesses of the county borough of Bury with regard to the running of omnibuses and for other purposes.
North British and Mercantile Insurance Company Limited Act 1927	17 & 18 Geo. 5. c. xiv	29 June 1927
An Act to repeal and amend certain provisions of the North British and Mercantile Insurance Company's Act 1920 (Note: North British and Mercantile Insurance Company's Act 1920 (10 & 11 Geo. 5. c. cxxxii)) to confer further powers on the Company and for other purposes.
Scottish Provident Institution Act 1927	17 & 18 Geo. 5. c. xv	29 June 1927
An Act to consolidate with amendments the provisions of the deed of constitution Acts Order and regulations under which the Scottish Provident Institution is carrying on its business to confer further powers on the Institution and for other purposes.
London, Midland and Scottish Railway Act 1927	17 & 18 Geo. 5. c. xvi	29 June 1927
An Act to empower the London Midland and Scottish Railway Company to construct railways and works and to acquire lands to extend the time for the compulsory purchase of certain lands and for the completion of certain works and for other purposes.
Matlocks Urban District Council Act 1927	17 & 18 Geo. 5. c. xvii	29 June 1927
An Act to provide for the consolidation with amendments of the local Acts and Orders in force in the Matlocks Urban District and for other purposes.
Stoke-on-Trent Corporation (Gas) Act 1927	17 & 18 Geo. 5. c. xviii	29 June 1927
An Act to confer further powers upon the Mayor Aldermen and Citizens of the City of Stoke-on-Trent with respect to their Gas Undertaking and for other purposes.
North Metropolitan Electric Power Supply Act 1927 (repealed)	17 & 18 Geo. 5. c. xix	29 June 1927
An Act to empower the North Metropolitan Electric Power Supply Company to raise additional capital. (Repealed by North Metropolitan Electric Power Supply (Consolidation) Act 1928 (18 & 19 Geo. 5. c. cxviii))
War Risks Association (Distribution of Reserve Funds) Act 1927	17 & 18 Geo. 5. c. xx	29 June 1927
An Act to enable the Britannia Steamship Insurance Association Limited the London Steamship Owners' Mutual Insurance Association Limited the Newcastle War Risks Indemnity Association Limited the Standard Steamship Owners' Mutual War Risks Association Limited the Sunderland Steamship Mutual War Risks Association Limited the United Kingdom Mutual War Risks Association Limited and the West of England Mutual War Risks Association Limited to distribute their war risks reserve funds and for other purposes.
Barnsley Corporation (Water) Act 1927	17 & 18 Geo. 5. c. xxi	29 June 1927
An Act to empower the mayor aldermen and burgesses of the county borough of Barnsley to construct additional waterworks and for other purposes.
London County Council (General Powers) Act 1927	17 & 18 Geo. 5. c. xxii	29 June 1927
An Act to confer further powers upon the London County Council and upon the corporation of the city of London and metropolitan borough councils and for other purposes.
Southern Railway Act 1927	17 & 18 Geo. 5. c. xxiii	29 June 1927
An Act to empower the Southern Railway Company to construct works and acquire lands to extend the time for the completion of certain works and the compulsory purchase of certain lands and for other purposes.
West Bridgford Urban District Council Act 1927 (repealed)	17 & 18 Geo. 5. c. xxiv	29 June 1927
An Act to confer further powers upon the Urban District Council of West Bridgford in regard to the running of omnibuses to make further and better provision for the health local government and improvement of their district and for other purposes. (Repealed by Nottinghamshire County Council Act 1985 (c. xv))
Yorkshire Electric Power Act 1927 (repealed)	17 & 18 Geo. 5. c. xxv	29 June 1927
An Act to increase the capital and borrowing powers of the Yorkshire Electric Power Company to confer further powers on that company and for other purposes. (Repealed by Statute Law (Repeals) Act 1989 (c. 43))
Mercantile Marine Memorial Act 1927	17 & 18 Geo. 5. c. xxvi	29 June 1927
An Act to confer powers on the Imperial War Graves Commission with respect to the erection of a memorial to the officers and men of the Mercantile Marine who perished in the late war.
Ministry of Health Provisional Orders Confirmation (No. 1) Act 1927	17 & 18 Geo. 5. c. xxvii	29 June 1927
An Act to confirm certain Provisional Orders of the Minister of Health relating to Bilston, Bournemouth, Carnarvon, Longtown and Border Joint Hospital District, Reigate Joint Hospital District, and Thurrock Grays and Tilbury Joint Sewerage District.
	Bilston Order 1927	
	Bournemouth Order 1927	
	Carnarvon Order 1927	
	Longtown and Border Joint Hospital Order 1927	
	Reigate Joint Hospital Order 1927	
	Thurrock Grays and Tilbury Joint Sewerage Order 1927	
Ministry of Health Provisional Orders Confirmation (No. 2) Act 1927	17 & 18 Geo. 5. c. xxviii	29 June 1927
An Act to confirm certain Provisional Orders of the Minister of Health relating to Bury and District Joint Water Board Chorley Kingstonupon-Thames Lancaster Shrewsbury and West Kent Joint Hospital District.
	Bury and District Joint Water Order 1927 Provisional Order for altering and amending the Bury and District Joint Water Board Act 1903. (Note: Bury and District Joint Water Board Act 1903 (3 Edw. 7. c. ccxxxiv))	
	Chorley Order 1927 Provisional Order for partially repealing certain Local Acts.	
	Kingston-upon-Thames Order 1927 Provisional Order for partially repealing a Local Act. (Note: Kingston-upon-Thames Improvement Act 1855 (18 & 19 Vict. c. xlv))	
	Lancaster Order 1927 Provisional Order for altering the Lancaster Corporation Act 1918. (Note: Lancaster Corporation Act 1918 (8 & 9 Geo. 5. c. lx))	
	Shrewsbury (Markets and Slaughter-houses) Order 1927 Provisional Order for altering and amending certain Local Acts.	
	West Kent Joint Hospital Order 1927 Provisional Order for altering certain Confirmation Acts.	
Ministry of Health Provisional Orders Confirmation (No. 3) Act 1927	17 & 18 Geo. 5. c. xxix	29 June 1927
An Act to confirm certain Provisional Orders of the Minister of Health relating to Barnes Cheltenham Newport (Monmouth) Newtown and Llanllwchaiarn Surbiton and Tees Valley Water Board.
	Barnes Order 1927 Provisional Order to enable the Urban District Council of Barnes to put in force the Compulsory Clauses of the Lands Clauses Acts.	
	Cheltenham Order 1927 Provisional Order for partially repealing altering or amending the Cheltenham Improvement Acts 1852 (Note: Cheltenham Improvement Act 1852 (15 & 16 Vict. c. l)) and 1889. (Note: Cheltenham Improvement Act 1889 (52 & 53 Vict. c. clxxxiv))	
	Newport (Monmouthshire) Order 1927 Provisional Order to enable the Newport Corporation to put in force the Compulsory Clauses of the Lands Clauses Acts.	
	Newtown and Llanllwchairn Order 1927 Provisional Order for altering the Newtown Water Act 1898. (Note: Newtown Water Act 1898 (61 & 62 Vict. c. clxiv))	
	Surbiton Order 1927 Provisional Order for partially repealing altering or amending the Surbiton Improvement Act 1855. (Note: Surbiton Improvement Act 1855 (18 & 19 Vict. c. xxxvi))	
	Tees Valley Water Order 1927 Provisional Order for altering the Tees Valley Water (Consolidation) Act 1907. (Note: Tees Valley Water (Consolidation) Act 1907 (7 Edw. 7. c. lxxx))	
Provisional Order (Marriages) Confirmation Act 1927 (repealed)	17 & 18 Geo. 5. c. xxx	29 June 1927
An Act to confirm a Provisional Order made by one of His Majesty's Principal Secretaries of State under the Marriages Validity (Provisional Orders) Acts 1905 (Note: Provisional Order (Marriages) Act 1905 (5 Edw. 7. c. 23)) and 1924. (Note: Marriages Validity (Provisional Orders) Act 1924 (14 & 15 Geo. 5. c. 20)) (Repealed by Statute Law (Repeals) Act 1977 (c. 18))
	St. Mary Llanfairisgaer Order	
Post Office (Sites) Act 1927 (repealed)	17 & 18 Geo. 5. c. xxxi	29 July 1927
An Act to enable the Postmaster-General for the purpose of the Post Office to acquire lands in London Blackpool and Cheltenham and to erect buildings on disused burial grounds in Leicester and for purposes connected therewith. (Repealed by Postal Services Act 2000 (Consequential Modifications to Local Enactments) Order 2003 (SI 2003/1542))
Feltwell Fuel Allotment Charity Scheme Confirmation Act 1927 (repealed)	17 & 18 Geo. 5. c. xxxii	29 July 1927
An Act to confirm a Scheme of the Charity Commissioners for the application or management of the Charity known as the Fuel Allotment in the Ancient Parishes of Feltwell St. Mary and Feltwell St. Nicholas in the County of Norfolk. (Repealed by Statute Law (Repeals) Act 2013 (c. 2))
	Scheme for the Application or Management of the Charity known as the Fuel Allotment in the Ancient Parishes of Feltwell St. Mary and Feltwell St. Nicholas in the County of Norfolk comprised in an Award dated the Eighth day of September One thousand eight hundred and fifteen made under the Inclosure Act 53 Geo. III Сар. СXLII. (Note: Feltwell Inclosure Act 1813 (53 Geo. 3. c. cxlii))	
Ministry of Health Provisional Orders Confirmation (No. 4) Act 1927	17 & 18 Geo. 5. c. xxxiii	29 July 1927
An Act to confirm certain Provisional Orders of the Minister of Health relating to Bootle Canterbury Ilford Isle of Thanet Llanelly and Uxbridge.
	Bootle Order 1927 Provisional Order for amending a Local Act (Note: Bootle Corporation Act 1890 (53 & 54 Vict. c. ccxix)) and Provisional Order.	
	Canterbury Order 1927 Provisional Order to enable the Canterbury Corporation to put in force the Compulsory Clauses of the Lands Clauses Acts.	
	Ilford Order 1927 Provisional Order for altering and amending the Ilford Urban District Council Act 1904. (Note: Ilford Urban District Council Act 1904 (4 Edw. 7. c. ccxix))	
	Isle of Thanet (Compulsory Purchase) Order 1927 Provisional Order to enable the Rural District Council of the Isle of Thanet to put in force the Compulsory Clauses of the Lands Clauses Acts.	
	Llanelly Order 1927 Provisional Order to enable the Llanelly Corporation to put in force the Compulsory Clauses of the Lands Clauses Acts.	
	Uxbridge Order 1927 Provisional Order to enable the Urban District Council of Uxbridge to put in force the Compulsory Clauses of the Lands Clauses Acts.	
Ministry of Health Provisional Orders Confirmation (No. 5) Act 1927	17 & 18 Geo. 5. c. xxxiv	29 July 1927
An Act to confirm certain Provisional Orders of the Minister of Health relating to Barnsley Blackburn Isle of Thanet Joint Hospital District Macclesfield Swansea and Tottenham.
	Barnsley Order 1927 Provisional Order for amending the Barnsley Corporation Act 1914. (Note: Barnsley Corporation Act 1914 (4 & 5 Geo. 5. c. xli))	
	Blackburn Order 1927 Provisional Order to enable the Blackburn Corporation to put in force the Compulsory Clauses of the Lands Clauses Acts.	
	Isle of Thanet Joint Hospital Order 1927 Provisional Order for altering certain Provisional Orders.	
	Macclesfield Order 1927 Provisional Order for partially repealing a Local Act. (Note: Macclesfield Corporation Act 1882)	
	Swansea Order 1927 Provisional Order to enable the Swansea Corporation to put in force the Compulsory Clauses of the Lands Clauses Acts.	
	Tottenham Order 1927 Provisional Order to enable the Urban District Council of Tottenham to put in force the Compulsory Clauses of the Lands Clauses Acts.	
Ministry of Health Provisional Orders Confirmation (No. 6) Act 1927	17 & 18 Geo. 5. c. xxxv	29 July 1927
An Act to confirm certain Provisional Orders of the Minister of Health relating to Amersham Beaconsfield and District Water Canterbury Water Dorking Water and Newhaven and Seaford Water.
	Amersham, Beaconsfield and District Water Order 1927 Provisional Order under the Gas and Water Works Facilities Act 1870 (Note: Gas and Water Works Facilities Act 1870 (33 & 34 Vict. c. 70)) and the Gas and Water Works Facilities Act 1870 Amendment Act 1873 (Note: Gas and Water Works Facilities Act 1870 Amendment Act 1873 (36 & 37 Vict. c. 89)) for empowering the Amersham Beaconsfield and District Waterworks Company Limited to maintain and continue waterworks to extend the limits of supply of the Company to authorise them to raise additional capital and for other purposes.	
	Canterbury Water Order 1927 Provisional Order under the Gas and Water Works Facilities Act 1870 and the Gas and Water Works Facilities Act 1870 Amendment Act 1873 for empowering the Canterbury Gas and Water Company to raise additional capital and to increase their borrowing powers for the purposes of their water undertaking.	
	Dorking Water Order 1927 Provisional Order under the Gas and Water Works Facilities Act 1870 and the Gas and Water Works Facilities Act 1870 Amendment Act 1873 for empowering the Dorking Water Company to raise additional capital and for other purposes.	
	Newhaven and Seaford Water Order 1927 Provisional Order under the Gas and Water Works Facilities Act 1870 and the Gas and Water Works Facilities Act 1870 Amendment Act 1873 for extending the area of supply of the Newhaven and Seaford Water Company empowering the Company to raise additional capital and for other purposes.	
Ministry of Health Provisional Orders Confirmation (No. 7) Act 1927	17 & 18 Geo. 5. c. xxxvi	29 July 1927
An Act to confirm certain Provisional Orders of the Minister of Health relating to Combe Down and District Water Thirsk District Water and York Water.
	Combe Down and District Water Order 1927 Provisional Order under the Gas and Water Works Facilities Act 1870 and the Gas and Water Works Facilities Act 1870 Amendment Act 1873 to empower the Combe Down (Bath) and General Waterworks Company Limited to maintain and continue waterworks to supply water and for other purposes.	
	Thirsk District Water Order 1927 Provisional Order under the Gas and Water Works Facilities Act 1870 and the Gas and Water Works Facilities Act 1870 Amendment Act 1873 altering the rates and charges leviable by and increasing the borrowing powers of the Thirsk District Water Company Limited and for other purposes.	
	York Waterworks Order 1927 Provisional Order under the Gas and Water Works Facilities Act 1870 and the Gas and Water Works Facilities Act 1870 Amendment Act 1873 to amend the York Waterworks Acts 1846 (Note: York New Waterworks Act 1846 (9 & 10 Vict. c. xvii)) 1876 (Note: York New Waterworks Act 1876 (39 & 40 Vict. c. l)) and 1895 (Note: York Waterworks Act 1895 (58 & 59 Vict. c. xxxix)) and for other purposes.	
Ministry of Health Provisional Orders Confirmation (No. 8) Act 1927	17 & 18 Geo. 5. c. xxxvii	29 July 1927
An Act to confirm certain Provisional Orders of the Minister of Health relating to Clare and Bumpstead Joint Hospital District Guildford Scarborough Sheffield Wandle Valley Joint Sewerage District and Whitehaven.
	Clare and Bumpstead Joint Hospital Order 1927 Provisional Order for repealing a Confirming Act. (Note: Local Government Board's Provisional Orders Confirmation (No. 13) Act 1897 (60 & 61 Vict. c. cxl))	
	Guildford Order 1927 Provisional Order to enable the Guildford Corporation to put in force the Compulsory Clauses of the Lands Clauses Acts.	
	Scarborough Order 1927 Provisional Order for altering and amending a Local Act. (Note: Scarborough Corporation Act 1925 (15 & 16 Geo. 5. c. cv))	
	Sheffield Order 1927 Provisional Order for altering a Local Act (Note: Sheffield Corporation Act 1912 (2 & 3 Geo. 5. c. clxvii)) and a Confirming Act. (Note: Ministry of Health Provisional Orders Confirmation (No. 9) Act 1923 (13 & 14 Geo. 5. c. lxiii))	
	Wandle Valley Joint Sewerage Order 1927 Provisional Order for altering the Local Government Board's Provisional Orders Confirmation (No. 5) Act 1916. (Note: Local Government Board's Provisional Orders Confirmation (No. 5) Act 1916 (6 & 7 Geo. 5. c. xxxv))	
	Whitehaven Order 1927 Provisional Order for altering certain Local Acts.	
Ministry of Health Provisional Orders Confirmation (No. 9) Act 1927	17 & 18 Geo. 5. c. xxxviii	29 July 1927
An Act to confirm certain Provisional Orders of the Minister of Health relating to Gillingham Hereford Margate Sheffield Swindon and Willenhall.
	Gillingham Order 1927	
	Hereford Order 1927	
	Margate Order 1927	
	Sheffield (Acquisition of Lands) Order 1927 Provisional Order to enable the Sheffield Corporation to put in force the Compulsory Clauses of the Lands Clauses Acts.	
	Swindon Order 1927	
	Willenhall Order 1927	
Ministry of Health Provisional Orders Confirmation (No. 11) Act 1927	17 & 18 Geo. 5. c. xxxix	29 July 1927
An Act to confirm certain Provisional Orders of the Minister of Health relating to Essex Port Talbot Shoreham-by-Sea and Southend-on-Sea.
	County of Essex Order 1927 Provisional Order made in pursuance of Sections 69 (2) and 87 of the Local Government Act 1888. (Note: Local Government Act 1888 (51 & 52 Vict. c. 41))	
	Port Talbot Order 1927 Provisional Order for altering and amending the Aberavon Local Board Act 1866. (Note: Aberavon Local Board Act 1866 (29 & 30 Vict. c. ccxl))	
	Shoreham-by-Sea Order 1927 Provisional Order to enable the Urban District Council of Shoreham-by-Sea to put in force the Compulsory Clauses of the Lands Clauses Acts.	
	Southend-on-Sea Order 1927 Provisional Order to enable the Southend-on-Sea Corporation to put in force the Compulsory Clauses of the Lands Clauses Acts.	
Ministry of Health Provisional Orders Confirmation (No. 12) Act 1927	17 & 18 Geo. 5. c. xl	29 July 1927
An Act to confirm certain Provisional Orders of the Minister of Health relating to Seaton Burn Valley Joint Sewerage District and Ware.
	Seaton Burn Valley Joint Sewerage Order 1927 Provisional Order for forming a United District under Section 279 of the Public Health Act 1875. (Note: Public Health Act 1875 (38 & 39 Vict. c. 55))	
	Ware Order 1927 Provisional Order to enable the Urban District Council of Ware to put in force the Compulsory Clauses of the Lands Clauses Acts.	
Pier and Harbour Orders Confirmation (No. 1) Act 1927	17 & 18 Geo. 5. c. xli	29 July 1927
An Act to confirm certain Provisional Orders made by the Minister of Transport under the General Pier and Harbour Act 1861 (Note: General Pier and Harbour Act 1861 (24 & 25 Vict. c. 45)) relating to Plymouth and Southend-on-Sea.
	Plymouth Piers Order 1927 Provisional Order for authorising the mayor aldermen and burgesses of the borough of Plymouth to construct landing stages within the borough of Plymouth and for other purposes.	
	Southend-on-Sea Pier Order 1927 Provisional Order for authorising the extension widening and improvement of the existing Southend Pier and for other purposes.	
Pier and Harbour Orders Confirmation (No. 2) Act 1927	17 & 18 Geo. 5. c. xlii	29 July 1927
An Act to confirm certain Provisional Orders made by the Minister of Transport under the General Pier and Harbour Act 1861 relating to Brightlingsea and Nairn.
	Brightlingsea Harbour Order 1927 Order for the management and improvement of Brightlingsea Harbour in the County of Essex.	
	Nairn Harbour Order 1927 Order for empowering the provost magistrates and councillors of the royal burgh of Nairn in the county of Nairn to construct new works at Nairn Harbour to borrow money for the purposes thereof to levy tolls rates and charges and for other purposes.	
Sheffield Corporation Tramways Order Confirmation Act 1927 (repealed)	17 & 18 Geo. 5. c. xliii	29 July 1927
An Act to confirm a Provisional Order made by the Minister of Transport under the Tramways Act 1870 (Note: Tramways Act 1870 (33 & 34 Vict. c. 78)) relating to Sheffield Corporation Tramways. (Repealed by Statute Law (Repeals) Act 1989 (c. 43))
	Sheffield Corporation Tramways Order 1927 Order authorising the lord mayor aldermen and citizens of the city of Sheffield to construct additional tramways in the said city and for other purposes.	
Cardiff Corporation Tramways Order Confirmation Act 1927 (repealed)	17 & 18 Geo. 5. c. xliv	29 July 1927
An Act to confirm a Provisional Order made by the Minister of Transport under the Tramways Act 1870 relating to Cardiff Corporation Tramways. (Repealed by County of South Glamorgan Act 1976 (c. xxxv))
	Cardiff Corporation Tramways Order 1927 Order authorising the Corporation of Cardiff to construct additional Tramways in the City of Cardiff and for other purposes.	
Ministry of Health Provisional Order Confirmation (Conway Extension) Act 1927	17 & 18 Geo. 5. c. xlv	29 July 1927
An Act to confirm a Provisional Order of the Minister of Health relating to Conway.
	Conway (Extension) Order 1927 Provisional Order made in pursuance of the Local Government Act 1888 for the extension of a Borough.	
Ministry of Health Provisional Order Confirmation (New Sarum Extension) Act 1927	17 & 18 Geo. 5. c. xlvi	29 July 1927
An Act to confirm a Provisional Order of the Minister of Health relating to New Sarum.
	New Sarum (Extension) Order 1927 Provisional Order made in pursuance of the Local Government Act 1888 for the extension of a Borough.	
Ministry of Health Provisional Order Confirmation (Newcastle-under-Lyme Extension) Act 1927 (repealed)	17 & 18 Geo. 5. c. xlvii	29 July 1927
An Act to confirm a Provisional Order of the Minister of Health relating to Newcastle-under-Lyme. (Repealed by Staffordshire Act 1983 (c. xviii))
	Newcastle-under-Lyme (Extension) Order 1927 Provisional Order made in pursuance of the Local Government Act 1888 for extending a Borough.	
Ministry of Health Provisional Order Confirmation (Wokingham Extension) Act 1927 (repealed)	17 & 18 Geo. 5. c. xlviii	29 July 1927
An Act to confirm a Provisional Order of the Minister of Health relating to Wokingham. (Repealed by Berkshire Act 1986 (c. ii))
	Wokingham (Extension) Order 1927 Provisional Order made in pursuance of the Local Government Act 1888 for the extension of a Borough.	
Ministry of Health Provisional Order Confirmation (Hove Extension) Act 1927	17 & 18 Geo. 5. c. xlix	29 July 1927
An Act to confirm a Provisional Order of the Minister of Health relating to Hove.
	Hove (Extension) Order 1927 Provisional Order made in pursuance of the Local Government Act 1888 for the extension of a Borough.	
Ouse and Cam Fisheries Provisional Order Confirmation Act 1927	17 & 18 Geo. 5. c. l	29 July 1927
An Act to confirm a Provisional Order under the Salmon and Freshwater Fisheries Act 1923 (Note: Salmon and Freshwater Fisheries Act 1923 (13 & 14 Geo. 5. c. 16)) relating to the Rivers Ouse and Cam and other waters.
	Ouse and Cam District Fishery Order 1926 (Note: Although passed in 1927, the short title is specified as the Ouse and Cam District Fishery Order 1926.) Ouse and Cam District Fishery Order 1926.	
Airdrie Burgh Extension, &c. Order Confirmation Act 1927	17 & 18 Geo. 5. c. li	29 July 1927
An Act to confirm a Provisional Order under the Private Legislation Procedure (Scotland) Act 1899 relating to Airdrie Burgh Extension &c.
	Airdrie Burgh, &c. Order 1927 Provisional Order to extend the municipal and police boundaries of the burgh of Airdrie in the county of Lanark and to confer further powers on the provost magistrates and councillors of the burgh of Airdrie in connection with their gas undertaking and for other purposes.	
Bolton and Kingston upon Hull Provisional Orders Confirmation Act 1927	17 & 18 Geo. 5. c. lii	29 July 1927
An Act to confirm certain Provisional Orders made by one of His Majesty's Principal Secretaries of State under the Public Health Act 1875 relating to Bolton and Kingston upon Hull.
	Bolton Order 1927 Provisional Order for altering the Bolton Corporation Act 1922. (Note: Bolton Corporation Act 1922 (12 & 13 Geo. 5. c. xciii))	
	Kingston upon Hull Order 1927 Provisional Order made by the Secretary of State under the Kingston upon Hull Corporation Act 1907. (Note: Kingston-upon-Hull Corporation Act 1907 (7 Edw. 7. c. cvi))	
Mexborough and Swinton Tramways Company (Trolley Vehicles) Order Confirmation Act 1927 (repealed)	17 & 18 Geo. 5. c. liii	29 July 1927
An Act to confirm a Provisional Order made by the Minister of Transport under the Mexborough and Swinton Tramways Act 1926 (Note: Mexborough and Swinton Tramways Act 1926 (16 & 17 Geo. 5. c. lxxvi)) relating to Mexborough and Swinton Tramways Company's trolley vehicles. (Repealed by Mexborough and Swinton Traction Act 1960 (8 & 9 Eliz. 2. c. xxiv))
	Mexborough and Swinton Tramways Company (Trolley Vehicles) Order 1927 Order authorising the Mexborough and Swinton Tramways Company to use trolley vehicles on routes in the urban districts of Mexborough Swinton Rawmarsh Greasbrough Bolton-upon-Dearne and Conisbrough and in the parish of Adwick-upon-Dearne in the rural district of Doncaster all in the West Riding of the County of York.	
Rotherham Corporation (Trolley Vehicles) Order Confirmation Act 1927 (repealed)	17 & 18 Geo. 5. c. liv	29 July 1927
An Act to confirm a Provisional Order made by the Minister of Transport under the Rotherham Corporation Act 1924 (Note: Rotherham Corporation Act 1924 (14 & 15 Geo. 5. c. lxix)) relating to Rotherham Corporation trolley vehicles. (Repealed by Statute Law (Repeals) Act 1989 (c. 43))
	Rotherham Corporation (Trolley Vehicles) Order 1927 Order authorising the mayor aldermen and burgesses of the county borough of Rotherham to provide maintain and use trolley vehicles upon additional routes.	
Southend-on-Sea Corporation (Trolley Vehicles) Order Confirmation Act 1927 (repealed)	17 & 18 Geo. 5. c. lv	29 July 1927
An Act to confirm a Provisional Order made by the Minister of Transport under the Southend-on-Sea Corporation Act 1926 (Note: Southend-on-Sea Corporation Act 1926 (16 & 17 Geo. 5. c. civ)) relating to Southend-on-Sea Corporation trolley vehicles. (Repealed by Essex Act 1987 (c. xx))
	Southend-on-Sea Corporation (Trolley Vehicles) Order 1927 Order authorising the mayor aldermen and burgesses of the borough of Southend-on-Sea to provide maintain and use trolley vehicles upon a route in the borough of Southend-on-Sea.	
Darlington Corporation Trolley Vehicles (Additional Routes) Order Confirmation Act 1927	17 & 18 Geo. 5. c. lvi	29 July 1927
An Act to confirm a Provisional Order made by the Minister of Transport under the Darlington Corporation (Transport &c.) Act 1925 (Note: Darlington Corporation (Transport, &c.) Act 1925 (15 & 16 Geo. 5. c. cxvi)) relating to Darlington Corporation trolley vehicles.
	Darlington Corporation Trolley Vehicles (Additional Routes) Order 1927 Order authorising the Mayor Aldermen and Burgesses of the Borough of Darlington to use Trolley Vehicles upon additional routes in the County Borough of Darlington.	
St. Helens Corporation (Trolley Vehicles) Order Confirmation Act 1927	17 & 18 Geo. 5. c. lvii	29 July 1927
An Act to confirm a Provisional Order made by the Minister of Transport under the St. Helens Corporation Act 1921 (Note: St. Helens Corporation Act 1921 (11 & 12 Geo. 5. c. lxxiii)) relating to St. Helens Corporation trolley vehicles.
	St. Helens Corporation (Trolley Vehicles) Order 1927 Order authorising the Mayor Aldermen and Burgesses of the borough of St. Helens to provide maintain and use trolley vehicles upon certain routes in the borough of St. Helens and the township of Windle in the rural district of Whiston.	
Maidstone Corporation (Trolley Vehicles) Order Confirmation Act 1927	17 & 18 Geo. 5. c. lviii	29 July 1927
An Act to confirm a Provisional Order made by the Minister of Transport under the Maidstone Corporation Act 1923 (Note: Maidstone Corporation Act 1923 (13 & 14 Geo. 5. c. xxxi)) relating to Maidstone Corporation trolley vehicles.
	Maidstone Corporation (Trolley Vehicles) Order 1927 Order authorising the mayor aldermen and burgesses of the borough of Maidstone to use trolley vehicles upon routes in the borough of Maidstone and the parish of Loose.	
Glasgow Corporation Order Confirmation Act 1927	17 & 18 Geo. 5. c. lix	29 July 1927
An Act to confirm a Provisional Order under the Private Legislation Procedure (Scotland) Act 1899 relating to Glasgow Corporation.
	Glasgow Corporation Order 1927 Provisional Order to authorise the Corporation of the City of Glasgow to construct a Bridge over the River Clyde at Finnieston to construct Tramways and other Works to abandon their River Supply Works and confer further powers on them in connection with their Water Undertaking to borrow money to extend the time for the construction of Tramways and other Works and for other purposes.	
Ayr Burgh (Water, &c.) Order Confirmation Act 1927	17 & 18 Geo. 5. c. lx	29 July 1927
An Act to confirm a Provisional Order under the Private Legislation Procedure (Scotland) Act 1899 relating to Ayr Burgh (Water &c.).
	Ayr Burgh (Water, &c.) Order 1927 Provisional Order to authorise the Provost Magistrates and Councillors of the Burgh of Ayr to construct additional waterworks to make provision with regard to their water undertaking to confer further borrowing and financial powers upon the Corporation and for other purposes.	
Aberdare Urban District Council Act 1927	17 & 18 Geo. 5. c. lxi	29 July 1927
An Act to enable the urban district council of Aberdare to execute street improvements to authorise them to discontinue trolley vehicle services to confer further powers on them with respect to tramways and omnibuses the supply of electricity and water and the health local government and improvement of their district and for other purposes.
St. Catharine's College Cambridge (Canonship of Norwich) Act 1927	17 & 18 Geo. 5. c. lxii	29 July 1927
An Act to separate a Canonship or Prebend in Norwich Cathedral from the Mastership or Wardenship of St. Catharine's College Cambridge to annex the said Canonship or Prebend to the Archdeaconry of Norfolk and to provide for matters incidental thereto.
Westgate and Birchington Water Act 1927	17 & 18 Geo. 5. c. lxiii	29 July 1927
An Act to confer further powers on the Westgate and Birchington Water Company and for other purposes.
Bristol Waterworks Act 1927	17 & 18 Geo. 5. c. lxiv	29 July 1927
An Act to authorise the Bristol Waterworks Company to construct new works to acquire additional lands and to raise additional capital and for other purposes.
Smethwick Corporation Act 1927 (repealed)	17 & 18 Geo. 5. c. lxv	29 July 1927
An Act to extend the boundaries of the borough of Smethwick to confer further powers upon the Corporation of that borough with respect to their gas undertaking to make further provision for the finance of the borough and for other purposes. (Repealed by West Midlands County Council Act 1980 (c. xi))
Bognor Gas and Electricity Act 1927	17 & 18 Geo. 5. c. lxvi	29 July 1927
An Act to confer further powers on the Bognor Gaslight and Coke Company to change the name of the Company and for other purposes.
Littlehampton Harbour and Arun Drainage Outfall Act 1927	17 & 18 Geo. 5. c. lxvii	29 July 1927
An Act to substitute for the Commissioners of the Port of Arundel and Harbour of Littlehampton a new Harbour Board and to transfer the harbour undertaking to them to change the name of the harbour to empower the West Sussex County Council to raise sums of money and to pay such sums to the Harbour Board to provide for contributions by local and other contributing authorities to amend the West Sussex County Council (Bridges) Act 1918 (Note: West Sussex County Council (Bridges) Act 1918 (8 & 9 Geo. 5. c. xli)) and for other purposes.
Maidstone Waterworks Act 1927	17 & 18 Geo. 5. c. lxviii	29 July 1927
An Act to authorise the Maidstone Waterworks Company to construct new works and to raise additional capital to confirm the construction of certain existing works and the acquisition of certain lands and for other purposes.
Hastings Tramways Company (Trolley Vehicles) Act 1927 (repealed)	17 & 18 Geo. 5. c. lxix	29 July 1927
An Act to authorise the Hastings Tramways Company to run trolley vehicles in substitution for their tramway and light railway services and on other routes and for other purposes. (Repealed by Hastings Tramways Act 1957 (5 & 6 Eliz. 2. c. xxxvi))
Derwent Valley Water Act 1927	17 & 18 Geo. 5. c. lxx	29 July 1927
An Act to confer further powers on the Derwent Valley Water Board and for other purposes.
Metropolitan Water Board Act 1927	17 & 18 Geo. 5. c. lxxi	29 July 1927
An Act to confer further powers upon the Metropolitan Water Board and for other purposes.
Wessex Electricity Act 1927	17 & 18 Geo. 5. c. lxxii	29 July 1927
An Act for incorporating and conferring powers on the Wessex Electricity Company and for other purposes.
Fleetwood Urban District Council Act 1927	17 & 18 Geo. 5. c. lxxiii	29 July 1927
An Act to empower the Fleetwood Urban District Council to construct a sea wall and other works to run omnibuses to confer further powers on the Council in regard to the supply of electricity and to make further and better provision for the health local government finance and improvement of the district and for other purposes.
Royal Albert Hall Act 1927	17 & 18 Geo. 5. c. lxxiv	29 July 1927
An Act to make further provision for the maintenance of the Royal Albert Hall to provide for a rate on seats therein and for other purposes.
Isle of Wight Water Act 1927	17 & 18 Geo. 5. c. lxxv	29 July 1927
An Act to make further provision as to the capital of the Isle of Wight Waterworks Company for varying the charges of the Company and for other purposes.
Greenock Burgh Extension, &c. Act 1927	17 & 18 Geo. 5. c. lxxvi	29 July 1927
An Act to extend the boundaries of the burgh of Greenock to make further provision in relation to streets sewers and other matters, to confer further powers upon the Corporation with regard to their water gas and electricity undertakings and for other purposes.
Grimsby Corporation Act 1927 (repealed)	17 & 18 Geo. 5. c. lxxvii	29 July 1927
An Act to consolidate the parishes of the borough of Grimsby to alter the boundaries of that borough to empower the mayor aldermen and burgesses of the borough to provide and work omnibuses and to confer further powers upon them with regard to the provision and working of trolley vehicles to extend the area of the Corporation for the supply of electricity to make further provision with respect to the tramway trolley vehicle omnibus and electricity undertakings of the Corporation and the health local government and improvement of the borough and for other purposes. (Repealed by Humberside Act 1982 (c. iii))
London County Council (Money) Act 1927 (repealed)	17 & 18 Geo. 5. c. lxxviii	29 July 1927
An Act to regulate the expenditure on capital account and lending of money by the London County Council during the financial period from the first day of April one thousand nine hundred and twenty-seven to the thirtieth day of September one thousand nine hundred and twenty-eight. (Repealed by London County Council (Loans) Act 1955 (4 & 5 Eliz. 2. c. xxvi))
Newcastle-upon-Tyne Corporation Act 1927 (repealed)	17 & 18 Geo. 5. c. lxxix	29 July 1927
An Act to confer further powers upon the lord mayor aldermen and citizens of the city and county of Newcastle-upon-Tyne with reference to the running of omnibuses and for other purposes. (Repealed by Tyne & Wear Act 1980 (c.xliii))
Abersoch Water Act 1927	17 & 18 Geo. 5. c. lxxx	29 July 1927
An Act to authorise the Abersoch Water Company Limited to construct and maintain waterworks and to supply water in part of the County of Carnarvon.
Brighton Corporation Act 1927	17 & 18 Geo. 5. c. lxxxi	29 July 1927
An Act to extend the boundaries of the borough of Brighton to alter and adjust the boundary between the boroughs of Brighton and Hove to constitute a single parish for the area of the extended borough of Brighton and for other purposes.
Buxton Corporation Act 1927	17 & 18 Geo. 5. c. lxxxii	29 July 1927
An Act to provide for the transfer to the mayor aldermen and burgesses of the borough of Buxton of the undertaking of the Buxton Gardens Company Limited and to confer powers upon the Corporation with respect to that undertaking to make further provision in regard to the electricity and water undertakings of the Corporation and the health local government and improvement of the borough and for other purposes.
Chepping Wycombe Corporation Act 1927	17 & 18 Geo. 5. c. lxxxiii	29 July 1927
An Act to extend the boundaries of the borough of Chepping Wycombe to provide for the extinction of the rights of depasturage in the Rye Mead and to confer further powers upon the Corporation of the said borough in regard to their water undertaking and the health local government and improvement of the borough and for other purposes.
Colchester Corporation Act 1927 (repealed)	17 & 18 Geo. 5. c. lxxxiv	29 July 1927
An Act to empower the mayor aldermen and burgesses of the borough of Colchester to provide and work trolley vehicles and omnibuses and for other purposes. (Repealed by Essex Act 1987 (c. xx))
Torquay Corporation Act 1927	17 & 18 Geo. 5. c. lxxxv	29 July 1927
An Act to confer further powers upon the mayor aldermen and burgesses of the borough of Torquay with respect to their water and electricity undertakings and the local government of the borough and for other purposes.
West Bromwich Corporation Act 1927 (repealed)	17 & 18 Geo. 5. c. lxxxvi	29 July 1927
An Act to alter the boundaries of the borough of West Bromwich to empower the mayor aldermen and burgesses of that borough to acquire lands and to purchase portions of certain tramways outside the borough to provide and work trolley vehicles and omnibuses and for other purposes. (Repealed by West Bromwich Corporation Act 1969 (c. lix))
Gainsborough Bridge (Acquisition) Act 1927	17 & 18 Geo. 5. c. lxxxvii	29 July 1927
An Act to authorise the county councils of the administrative counties of Nottingham and of the Parts of Lindsey Lincolnshire and the Gainsborough Urban District Council to purchase and the Company of Proprietors of Gainsborough Bridge to sell to them the undertaking and property of that Company and for other purposes.
Liverpool Corporation Act 1927	17 & 18 Geo. 5. c. lxxxviii	29 July 1927
An Act to extend the boundaries of the city of Liverpool to authorise the Corporation of that city to construct new streets additional tramways and other works to confer further powers upon them with respect to their tramways waterworks and electricity undertakings to make better provision for the health local government and finance of the city to provide for the disuse and deconsecration of the Chapel of the Liverpool School for the Indigent Blind to empower the Mersey Docks and Harbour Board to contribute towards the cost of a new arterial road between Liverpool and East Lancashire and for other purposes.
Bedford Corporation Act 1927	17 & 18 Geo. 5. c. lxxxix	29 July 1927
An Act to confirm the construction of certain waterworks by the Corporation of Bedford and to authorise them to construct further waterworks to confer powers upon the Corporation in regard to their water and electricity undertakings and for other purposes.
Coventry Corporation Act 1927	17 & 18 Geo. 5. c. xc	29 July 1927
An Act to empower the mayor aldermen and citizens of the city of Coventry to construct street works and tramways and to purchase the undertaking of the Kenilworth Gas Company to extend the areas of supply for gas and electricity of the Coventry Corporation to confer further powers on the Corporation with regard to the supply of gas and water and to enable them to increase their water charges to make further provision with regard to the health local government and improvement of the city the regulation of commons in and near the city and with regard to the freedom of the city and for other purposes.
Coventry Corporation (Boundary Extension) Act 1927 (repealed)	17 & 18 Geo. 5. c. xci	29 July 1927
An Act to extend the boundaries of the city of Coventry and for other purposes. (Repealed by West Midlands County Council Act 1980 (c. xi))
Derby Corporation Act 1927	17 & 18 Geo. 5. c. xcii	29 July 1927
An Act to extend the boundaries of the county borough of Derby to confer further powers upon the mayor aldermen and burgesses of that borough in relation to their water and tramway undertakings and other matters to make further provision in regard to the Derby Borough Court of Record and for other purposes.
Mersey Tunnel Act 1927	17 & 18 Geo. 5. c. xciii	29 July 1927
An Act to authorise an alteration of the tunnel under the River Mersey authorised by the Mersey Tunnel Act 1925 (Note: Mersey Tunnel Act 1925 (15 & 16 Geo. 5. c. cx)) and for other purposes.
Peterborough Corporation Act 1927	17 & 18 Geo. 5. c. xciv	29 July 1927
An Act to empower the mayor aldermen citizens and burgesses of the city and borough of Peterborough to lay out and develop lands and erect and maintain buildings in the city and borough of Peterborough to authorise the establishment of a consolidated loans fund and for other purposes.
Scarborough Gas (Consolidation) Act 1927	17 & 18 Geo. 5. c. xcv	29 July 1927
An Act to consolidate the Scarborough Gas Company's special Acts to extend their limits of supply to authorise the Company to acquire additional lands to construct additional works and to raise further capital and for other purposes.
South Staffordshire Mond Gas Act 1927	17 & 18 Geo. 5. c. xcvi	29 July 1927
An Act to confer further powers upon the South Staffordshire Mond Gas Company and for other purposes.
Sunderland Corporation Act 1927	17 & 18 Geo. 5. c. xcvii	29 July 1927
An Act to extend the boundaries of the borough of Sunderland to empower the mayor aldermen and burgesses of the borough to construct a quay and other works and to provide and work omnibuses to make further provision with regard to tramways and electricity and the health local government and improvement of the borough and for other purposes.
Saint Mary's Hospital (Newcastle-upon-Tyne) Act 1927	17 & 18 Geo. 5. c. xcviii	29 July 1927
An Act to amend Saint Mary's Hospital (Newcastle-upon-Tyne) Act 1888 (Note: Saint Mary's Hospital (Newcastle-upon-Tyne) Act 1888 (51 & 52 Vict. c. cvii)) and certain schemes made thereunder and for other purposes.
Salford Corporation Act 1927	17 & 18 Geo. 5. c. xcix	29 July 1927
An Act to empower the mayor aldermen and citizens of the city of Salford to execute street improvements and acquire lands to confer further powers upon them with reference to the running of omnibuses and to their tramway and electricity undertakings and for other purposes.
East Anglian Electricity Act 1927	17 & 18 Geo. 5. c. c	29 July 1927
An Act to confer further powers upon the East Anglian Electric Supply Company Limited relative to the supply of electricity in Norfolk and Suffolk and for other purposes.
Leeds Corporation Act 1927	17 & 18 Geo. 5. c. ci	29 July 1927
An Act to extend the boundaries of the city of Leeds to confer further powers upon the lord mayor aldermen and citizens of that city relative to the acquisition of the undertaking of the Crossgates Halton and Seacroft Gas Company Limited the construction of street improvements and other matters and for other purposes.
Birmingham Extension Act 1927 (repealed)	17 & 18 Geo. 5. c. cii	29 July 1927
An Act to extend the boundaries of the city of Birmingham and for other purposes. (Repealed by West Midlands County Council Act 1980 (c. xi))
Manchester Corporation Act 1927	17 & 18 Geo. 5. c. ciii	29 July 1927
An Act to empower the lord mayor aldermen and citizens of the city of Manchester to construct additional waterworks and for other purposes.
East Surrey Water Act 1927	17 & 18 Geo. 5. c. civ	29 July 1927
An Act to provide for the transfer to the East Surrey Water Company of the undertaking of the Leatherhead and District Waterworks Company to extend the area of supply of the East Surrey Water Company and authorise them to raise additional capital and for other purposes.
Birkenhead Extension Act 1927	17 & 18 Geo. 5. c. cv	29 July 1927
An Act to extend the boundaries of the borough of Birkenhead and for other purposes.
Croydon Corporation Act 1927	17 & 18 Geo. 5. c. cvi	29 July 1927
An Act to extend the boundaries of the borough of Croydon to authorise the mayor aldermen and burgesses of the borough to execute street works and to extend the time for the construction of the street works authorised by the Croydon Corporation Act 1924 (Note: Croydon Corporation Act 1924 (14 & 15 Geo. 5. c. xcviii)) to confer further powers upon the Corporation with regard to their electricity undertaking and the health local government and improvement of the borough and for other purposes.
County of London Electric Supply Company's Act 1927	17 & 18 Geo. 5. c. cvii	29 July 1927
An Act to confer further powers upon the County of London Electric Supply Company Limited with reference to the supply of electricity in the county of Essex and with reference to their existing areas of supply and for other purposes.
Swansea Corporation Act 1927	17 & 18 Geo. 5. c. cviii	29 July 1927
An Act to confer further powers on the Corporation of Swansea in relation to their water undertaking to vary agreements for the supply of water by the Corporation to empower the Corporation to acquire lands to execute street improvements and to make better provision for the health local government and finance of the borough and for other purposes.
London and Home Counties Joint Electricity Authority Act 1927	17 & 18 Geo. 5. c. cix	29 July 1927
An Act to confer upon the London and Home Counties Joint Electricity Authority powers to acquire lands and to construct a generating station and other works and for other purposes.
Kilmarnock Gas and Water Corporation Act 1927	17 & 18 Geo. 5. c. cx	23 November 1927
An Act to confirm a Provisional Order under the Burgh Police (Scotland) Act 1892 (Note: Burgh Police (Scotland) Act 1892 (55 & 56 Vict. c. 55)) relating to Kilmarnock Gas and Water.
Ministry of Health Provisional Orders Confirmation (No. 10) Act 1927	17 & 18 Geo. 5. c. cxi	22 December 1927
An Act to confirm certain Provisional Orders of the Minister of Health relating to Barry Basingstoke Hartlepool Port Sanitary District Oxford Romford Joint Hospital District and Sutton (Surrey).
	Barry Order 1927 Provisional Order. for altering and amending certain Local Acts.	
	Basingstoke Order 1927 Provisional Order for altering a Local Act. (Note: Basingstoke Market Act 1829 (10 Geo. 4. c. xlii))	
	Hartlepool Port Sanitary Order 1927 Provisional Order for repealing certain Confirming Acts.	
	Oxford Order 1927 Provisional Order for altering and amending a Local Act. (Note: Oxford (Corporation) Waterworks Act 1875 (38 & 39 Vict. c. xli))	
	Romford Joint Hospital Order 1927 Provisional Order for altering the Local Government Board's Provisional Orders Confirmation (No. 8) Act 1899. (Note: Local Government Board's Provisional Orders Confirmation (No. 8) Act 1899 (62 & 63 Vict. c. cxii))	
	Sutton (Surrey) Order 1927 Provisional Order to enable the Urban District Council of Sutton (Surrey) to put in force the Compulsory Clauses of the Lands Clauses Acts.	
Ministry of Health Provisional Order Confirmation (Sutton Coldfield Extension) Act 1927 (repealed)	17 & 18 Geo. 5. c. cxii	22 December 1927
An Act to confirm a Provisional Order of the Minister of Health relating to Sutton Coldfield. (Repealed by West Midlands County Council Act 1980 (c. xi))
	Sutton Coldfield (Extension) Order 1927 Provisional Order made in pursuance of the Local Government Act 1888 for the extension of a Borough.	
Lerwick Harbour Order Confirmation Act 1927	17 & 18 Geo. 5. c. cxiii	22 December 1927
An Act to confirm a Provisional Order under the Private Legislation Procedure (Scotland) Act 1899 relating to Lerwick Harbour.
	Lerwick Harbour Order 1927 Provisional Order to authorise the Trustees of the port and harbour of Lerwick to construct a harbour work to borrow money and for other purposes.	
Edinburgh Chartered Accountants Annuity, &c. Fund Order Confirmation Act 1927 (repealed)	17 & 18 Geo. 5. c. cxiv	22 December 1927
An Act to confirm a Provisional Order under the Private Legislation Procedure (Scotland) Act 1899 relating to Edinburgh Chartered Accountants Annuity &c. Fund. (Repealed by Statute Law (Repeals) Act 1986 (c. 12))
	Edinburgh Chartered Accountants Annuity &c. Fund Order 1927 Provisional Order to amend the provisions of the Edinburgh Chartered Accountants Annuity &c. Fund Act 1887 (Note: Edinburgh Chartered Accountants Annuity &c. Fund Act 1887 (50 & 51 Vict. c. xi)) and the Edinburgh Chartered Accountants Annuity &c. Fund Order 1924 with reference to the allocation amongst the contributors and widows of deceased contributors of the surplus ascertained at periodical investigations of the fund under the Act of 1887 and for other purposes.	
Edinburgh Corporation Order Confirmation Act 1927 (repealed)	17 & 18 Geo. 5. c. cxv	22 December 1927
An Act to confirm a Provisional Order under the Private Legislation Procedure (Scotland) Act 1899 relating to Edinburgh Corporation. (Repealed by Edinburgh Corporation Order Confirmation Act 1933 (24 & 25 Geo. 5. c. v))
	Edinburgh Corporation Order 1927 Provisional Order to authorise the Corporation of the city and royal burgh of Edinburgh to make and maintain tramways to construct works and improvements to acquire lands to amend the Edinburgh Municipal and Police Acts to borrow money and for other purposes.	
Renfrewshire County Council (Giffnock Railway Bridges) Order Confirmation Act 1927	17 & 18 Geo. 5. c. cxvi	22 December 1927
An Act to confirm a Provisional Order under the Private Legislation Procedure (Scotland) Act 1899 relating to Renfrewshire County Council (Giffnock Railway Bridges).
	Renfrewshire County Council (Giffnock Railway Bridges) Order 1927 Provisional Order to authorise the County Council of the county of Renfrew to widen and reconstruct bridges over the London Midland and Scottish Railway (Busby and East Kilbride Branch) at Giffnock in the parish of Eastwood in the said county to provide for the maintenance of the reconstructed bridges and for other purposes.	
Grampian Electricity Supply Order Confirmation Act 1927 (repealed)	17 & 18 Geo. 5. c. cxvii	22 December 1927
An Act to confirm a Provisional Order under the Private Legislation Procedure (Scotland) Act 1899 relating to Grampian Electricity Supply. (Repealed by North of Scotland Electricity Order Confirmation Act 1958 (7 & 8 Eliz. 2. c. ii))
	Grampian Electricity Supply Order 1927 Provisional Order to extend the period limited by the Grampian Electricity Supply Act 1922 (Note: Grampian Electricity Supply Act 1922 (12 & 13 Geo. 5. c. lxxix)) for the compulsory purchase of lands and for other purposes.	
Royal Edinburgh Hospital for Mental and Nervous Disorders Order Confirmation Act 1927	17 & 18 Geo. 5. c. cxviii	22 December 1927
An Act to confirm a Provisional Order under the Private Legislation Procedure (Scotland) Act 1899 relating to the Royal Edinburgh Hospital for Mental and Nervous Disorders.
	Royal Edinburgh Hospital for Mental and Nervous Disorders Order 1927 Provisional Order to change the names of the Corporation of the Royal Edinburgh Asylum for the Insane and of the Institution to confer further powers on the said Corporation and for other purposes.	
Dundee Corporation Order Confirmation Act 1927 (repealed)	17 & 18 Geo. 5. c. cxix	22 December 1927
An Act to confirm a Provisional Order under the Private Legislation Procedure (Scotland) Act 1899 relating to Dundee Corporation. (Repealed by Dundee Corporation (Consolidated Powers) Order Confirmation Act 1957 (6 & 7 Eliz. 2. c. iv))
	Dundee Corporation Order 1927 Provisional Order to confer powers on the Dundee Corporation to abandon the construction of road and sea wall works and substitute other works therefor to run omnibuses within the city to make certain provisions in respect of municipal administration and in connection with the finances of the city and for other purposes.	
Perth County Buildings Order Confirmation Act 1927	17 & 18 Geo. 5. c. cxx	22 December 1927
An Act to confirm a Provisional Order under the Private Legislation Procedure (Scotland) Act 1899 relating to Perth County Buildings.
	Perth County Buildings Order 1927 Provisional Order to vest the county buildings of the county of Perth at Perth in the County Council of that County and for other purposes.	
Heriot-Watt College and George Heriot's Trust Order Confirmation Act 1927	17 & 18 Geo. 5. c. cxxi	22 December 1927
An Act to confirm a Provisional Order under the Private Legislation Procedure (Scotland) Act 1899 relating to Heriot-Watt College and George Heriot's Trust.
	Heriot-Watt College and George Heriot's Trust Order 1927 Provisional Order to incorporate and confer powers on the Governors of Heriot-Watt College to re-incorporate and confer further powers on the Governors of George Heriot's Trust and for other purposes.	
Wallasey Corporation Act 1927	17 & 18 Geo. 5. c. cxxii	22 December 1927
An Act to authorise the mayor aldermen and burgesses of the borough of Wallasey to construct a tramway promenades street improvements and other works and to provide and work trolley vehicles and to acquire the undertaking of the New Brighton Pier Company to confer further powers upon the Corporation with reference to their ferries gas water electricity tramway and omnibus undertakings and the health local government and improvement of the borough to alter the boundaries of the borough and for other purposes.
West Cheshire Water Board Act 1927	17 & 18 Geo. 5. c. cxxiii	22 December 1927
An Act to authorise the West Cheshire Water Board to acquire further waterworks and additional lands and to construct new works to extend their limits of supply and for other purposes.

=== Private and personal acts ===
Short title	Citation	Royal assent
Long title
Bury Estate Act 1927	17 & 18 Geo. 5. c. 1 Pr.	29 July 1927
An Act to vary the trusts powers and provisions of two several settlements both dates the seventeenth day of August one thousand nine hundred and twenty and executed on the marriage of Ralph Frederic Bury and Violet Esmé Bentley.

== See also ==
- List of acts of the Parliament of the United Kingdom
