= Essential services =

Occupations with restrictions in striking

Essential services may refer to a class of occupations that have been legislated by a government to have special restrictions in regard to labour actions such as not being allowed to strike.

The International Labour Office, a United Nations agency, distinguishes an essential service from a minimum service.

Industries defined as essential services differ based on the organization or government but generally include services such as hospitals and other healthcare, utilities such as electricity and water supply, law enforcement and firefighting, and food services.

== Public health emergencies ==
"Essential services" may also refer to those services that are vital to the health and welfare of a population and so are essential to maintain even in a disaster. During the COVID-19 pandemic, many jurisdictions ordered non-essential services to close for several weeks in an effort to control the spread of the virus. The United States Department of Homeland Security's Cybersecurity and Infrastructure Security Agency issued a nation-wide guidance document that defined activities that the Agency had determined to be "essential" to the control of the pandemic and the management of its effects.

Examples of industries in which at least some workers were classified as "essential" during the pandemic included:

- Health care, public health, and human services
- Law enforcement, public safety, and first responders
- Food and agriculture
- Energy
- Water and wastewater
- Transportation and logistics
- Public works
- Communications and information technology
- Other community-based essential functions and government operations
- Critical manufacturing
- Supply chains
- Retail and wholesaling
- Food services and accommodations
- Institutional, residential, commercial, and industrial maintenance
- Manufacturing and production
- Construction
- Financial activities
- Resources
- Environmental services
- Utilities and community services
- Communications industries
- Research
- Justice
- Business regulators and inspectors
