= Fair Work Agency =

Executive agency responsible for enforcing employment rights in the United Kingdom

Agency overview
- Type: Executive Agency
- Jurisdiction: United Kingdom
- Annual budget: £60.1 million (2026-27)
- Agency executive: Lisa Pinney, CEO
- Parent agency: Department for Business and Trade

The Fair Work Agency (FWA) is an executive agency of the Department for Business and Trade and is responsible for enforcing employment rights in the United Kingdom.

== History ==
The FWA was created on 7 April 2026 following the passing of the Employment Rights Act 2025. It brought together the powers of four former public bodies; the Gangmasters and Labour Abuse Authority, the Employment Agency Standards Inspectorate, the National Minimum Wage enforcement team and the Office of the Director of Labour Market Abuse.

== Appointments ==
The FWA appointed Lisa Pinney OBE as CEO of the organization in April 2026, her last role having been as CEO of the Mining Remediation Authority, known colloquially as the Coal Authority. Upon taking the role, Pinney described the mission of the FWA as being "to support workers, simplify compliance for businesses and ensure fair and lawful treatment for all".

Kate Dearden MP, the Minister for Employment Rights and Consumer Protection, commented that by appointing Pinney the FWA would be "delivering our Plan to Make Work Pay — ensuring workers get the rights and protections they are entitled to, while creating a simpler, fairer system and source of advice for employers".

== Scope ==
The FWA negotiated funding of £60.1 million for the financial year of 26-27. This represents an increase of over 25% from the combined £47.4 million budget of the various predecessor bodies it replaced.
