= Trade Disputes and Trade Unions Act 1946 =

Act of the Parliament of the United Kingdom

Trade Disputes and Trade Unions Act 1946 (Note: Section 2.)
- Act of Parliament
- Parliament of the United Kingdom
- Long title: An Act to repeal the Trade Disputes and Trade Unions Act 1927, and to restore all enactments and rules of law thereby affected.
- Citation: 9 & 10 Geo. 6. c. 52
- Introduced by: Hartley Shawcross
- Territorial extent: United Kingdom

Dates
- Royal assent: 22 May 1946
- Commencement: 22 May 1946 (Note: The Acts of Parliament (Commencement) Act 1793.)
- Repealed: 16 October 1992
Other legislation
Repeals/revokes	Trade Disputes and Trade Unions Act 1927
Amended by	Statute Law (Repeals) Act 1973
Repealed by	Trade Union and Labour Relations (Consolidation) Act 1992
Relates to	Trade Disputes Act 1906; Trade Disputes and Trade Unions Act 1927

Status: Repealed

Text of statute as originally enacted

Revised text of statute as amended

The Trade Disputes And Trade Unions Act 1946 (9 & 10 Geo. 6. c. 52) was an act of the Parliament of the United Kingdom passed by post-war Labour government to repeal the Trade Disputes and Trade Unions Act 1927 (17 & 18 Geo. 5. c. 22).

== Subsequent developments ==
In section 1, the words from " subject to " to " to this Act ", and the schedule to, were repealed by section 1(1) of, and part XIII of schedule 1 to, the Statute Law (Repeals) Act 1973, which came into force on 18 July 1973.

The whole act was repealed by the section 300(1) of, and schedule 1 to, the Trade Union and Labour Relations (Consolidation) Act 1992, which came into force on 16 October 1992.

== See also ==
- Amalgamated Society of Railway Servants v Osborne [1910] AC 87
- Trade Union Act 1913
- Trade Disputes and Trade Unions Act 1927
- Trade Union and Labour Relations (Consolidation) Act 1992 s 82
