= Trade Union Act 1984 =

Act of the Parliament of the United Kingdom

Trade Union Act 1984 (Note: Section 22(1).)
- Act of Parliament
- Parliament of the United Kingdom
- Long title: An Act to make provision for election to certain positions in trade unions and with respect to ballots held in connection with strikes or other forms of industrial action; to require trade unions to compile and maintain registers of members' names and addresses; to amend the law relating to expenditure by trade unions and unincorporated employers' associations on political objects; and to amend sections 1 and 2 of the Employment Act 1980.
- Citation: 1984 c. 49
- Territorial extent: England and Wales; Scotland; Northern Ireland (except parts II and II and sections 18 and 20); (Note: Section 22(5).)

Dates
- Royal assent: 26 July 1984
- Commencement: 26 July 1984 (section 4) (Note: Section 22(2).); (part I) (Note: Section 22(3).); 26 October 1984(part II) (Note: Section 22(4).); 31 March 1985 (part III) (Note: Section 22(5).)
- Repealed: 16 October 1992
Other legislation
Repealed by	Trade Union and Labour Relations (Consolidation) Act 1992

Status: Repealed

Text of statute as originally enacted

Revised text of statute as amended

The Trade Union Act 1984 (c. 49) was an act of the Parliament of the United Kingdom that required all trade unions to hold a secret ballot before calling a strike. The majority of the act did not apply to trade unions based in Northern Ireland. The act was repealed on 16 October 1992. Sir Peter Bottomley, an employment minister, reportedly said that the act was "designed to ensure that trade unions are more democratic and their leaders more accountable to their members."

The act also required unions to elect a new general secretary every five years and to validate funds every ten years.

Kenneth Clarke, who is a politician for the Conservative Party (UK) reported that, at a point approximately two years after the passing of the bill, 19 unions changed the practice to comply with the act. The act also says that those who are in high up positions in the union must "be accountable to the membership [of the union] as a whole."

== Context ==
At the time the act was passed, the UK miner's strike had just started and, as a result, the government passed acts like this to limit the effect caused by strikes by this. Some people have said that the law was passed after the start of the Falklands War due to the increase in popularity for the government brought on by the conflict.

== Effect ==
The act limited the amount of industrial action by strengthening the requirements for a strike to be considered lawful. It also allowed the legality of the miners' strike to be questioned, as members of the National Union of Mineworkers were not given the chance to vote on this issue.

As a result of this act, striking miners were not entitled to state benefits, thus forcing the majority of miners and their families to survive the strike on handouts, donations from the European "food mountain" and other charities. Being without benefits had more serious consequences for the miners and their families. Their children were not entitled to free school meals or social security help with school uniforms. Poverty and hunger became rife in the mining heartlands. This forced many miners into a dilemma: return to work, and be viewed as a "scab"; or maintain support and live primarily on donations, which is what the majority did.

== Subsequent developments ==
The whole act was repealed by the section 300(1) of, and schedule 1 to, the Trade Union and Labour Relations (Consolidation) Act 1992, which came into force on 16 October 1992.

== Bibliography ==
- Department of Employment, Democracy in Trade Unions (1983) Cm 8778
- E McGaughey, 'Democracy or Oligarchy? Models of Union Governance in the UK, Germany and US' (2017) ssrn.com
