= Essex Act 1987 =

- Act of Parliament
- Parliament of the United Kingdom
- Long title: An Act to re-enact with amendments and to extend certain local statutory provisions in force within the county of Essex; to confer further powers on the Essex County Council, local authorities in the county and the Crouch Harbour Authority; to make further provision with respect to the improvement, health and local government of the county; and for other purposes.
- Citation: 1987 c. xx

Dates
- Royal assent: 23 July 1987

Status: Current legislation

Text of statute as originally enacted

Text of the Essex Act 1987 as in force today (including any amendments) within the United Kingdom, from legislation.gov.uk.

The Essex Act 1987 (c. xx) is a local act of Parliament whose effect is to give additional local powers to Essex County Council, local authorities in the county as well as the Crouch Harbour Authority.

== Provisions ==
The act encompasses a number of powers affecting aspects of issues relating to land and open space (especially parking); highways and streets; public health and amenities; public order and safety, seashore and safety (specifically in the districts of Basildon, Castle Point, Chelmsford, Colchester, Maldon, Rochford, Southend-on-Sea, Tendring, Thurrock); some finance and other miscellaneous powers and other specific measures relating to named places including Colchester, Crouch Harbour, The Marshes (in the Epping Forest district), and Southend-on-Sea

The most notable clause in the law is section 6, allowing the prohibition of parking on grass verges. The maximum fine for this under the act is £70.

Section 11 of the act makes it an offence to "sell anything from within the designated areas of Southend-on-sea" and, in 2022, was used to give an individual a fine of £3,000 for selling ice cream on the Southend seafront.

The act requires massage parlours and other similar organisations be licensed by the council.
