= Minimum services =

Services that are considered essential

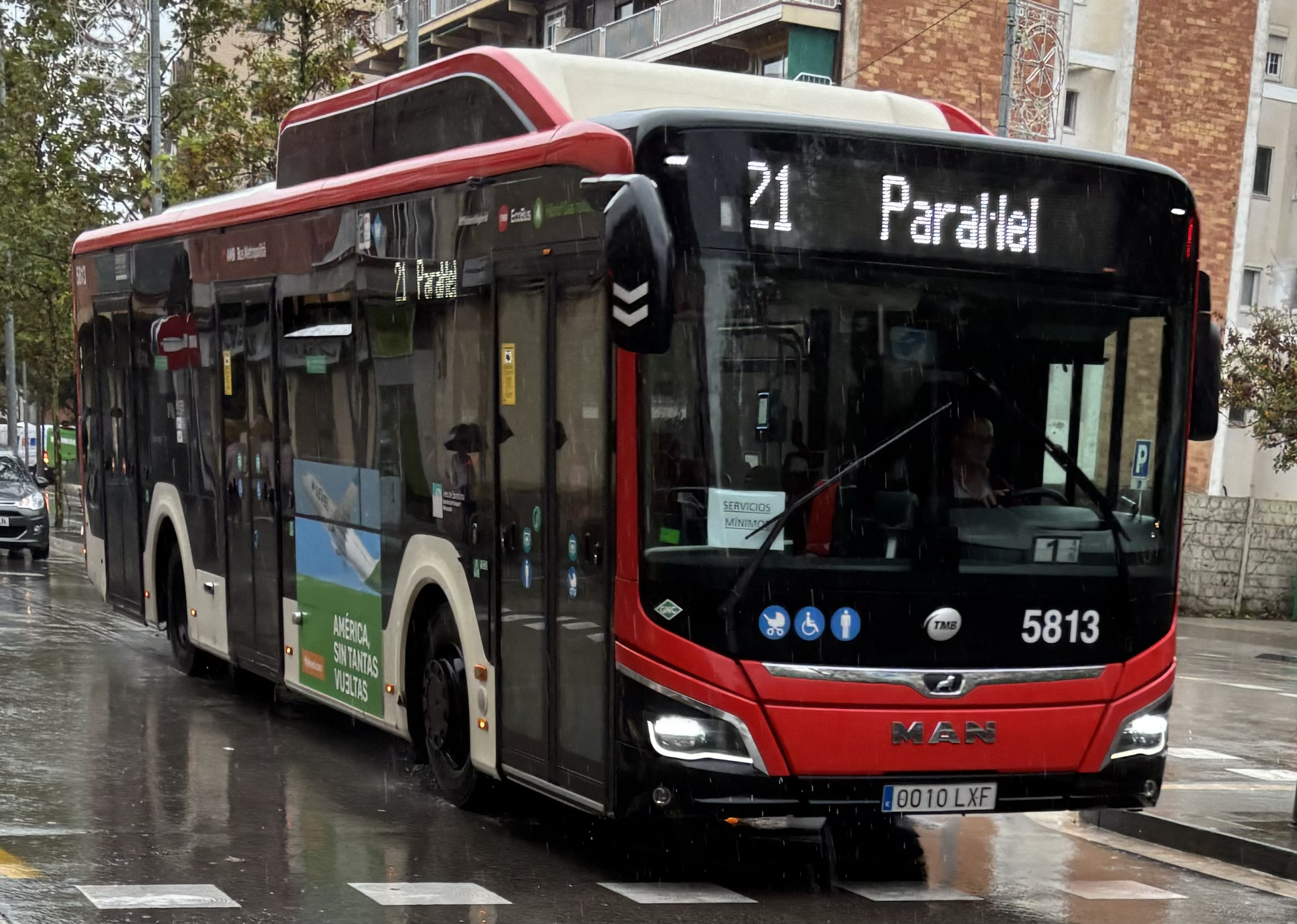
Bus in Barcelona providing 20% of services during a drivers' strike in 2024.

Minimum services are, during an event or occurrence (for example, a workers' strike), those services considered essential that continue to be provided to avoid shortages, lack of production, administrative chaos, etc. The determination of minimum services in crucial services is sometimes a limitation of the right to strike, which matches the corresponding governmental authority in each State.

They are quantified as a percentage of normal day-to-day services.

== Essential minimum services and abusive minimum services ==
There may be disagreements about what is considered an essential service and what is not. Trade unions often criticize the establishment of minimum services that they consider abusive, because they believe they are too high (similar or even higher than those of a normal day) or applied to non-essential services. They consider that abusive minimum services cause the strike to cease to be noticed, thus distorting the right to strike.

For example, in Spain the CNT considers that the only minimum services are legal and that they require emergency and health care and people with disabilities, and therefore require the minimum services in transport and other sectors.

== In Europe ==
In Germany and Austria, statutory civil servants (30% of the civil service) do not have the right to strike, "doesn't shock anyone". In Spain and Italy there is a minimum service for rush hours.

=== In Spain ===
The basic regulations are contained in Royal Decree-Law 17/1977, of March 4, on labor relations; ; in Royal Legislative Decree 2/2015, of October 23, approving the consolidated text of the Workers' Statute Law, in the specific rule issued before each strike call, and in administrative and judicial precedents.

=== In France ===
In 1980, a minimum service clause was suggested to ensure the safety of children in the care of private monitors.

In 1986, 31% of companies wanted the post office to organize a minimum service in the event of a strike.

In 1992, Air France sought to establish a guaranteed minimum service to standardize the quality of service.

== See also ==
- Essential services
