= Trade Union Act 2016 =

Act of the Parliament of the United Kingdom

Trade Union Act 2016 (Note: Section 26.)
- Act of Parliament
- Parliament of the United Kingdom
- Long title: An Act to make provision about industrial action, trade unions, employers' associations and the functions of the Certification Officer.
- Citation: 2016 c. 15
- Introduced by: Sajid Javid (Commons); Baroness Neville-Rolfe (Lords)
- Territorial extent: United Kingdom (Note: Section 24.)

Dates
- Royal assent: 4 May 2016
- Commencement: Various (Note: Section 26.)
Other legislation
Amends	Trade Union and Labour Relations (Consolidation) Act 1992; Trade Union Reform and Employment Rights Act 1993; Employment Rights Act 1996
Amended by	Employment Rights Act 2025

Status: Amended

History of passage through Parliament

Text of statute as originally enacted

Revised text of statute as amended

The Trade Union Act 2016 (c. 15) is an act of the Parliament of the United Kingdom that amended the Trade Union and Labour Relations (Consolidation) Act 1992 (TULRCA). It forms part of the UK's labour law, which was passed during the second Cameron ministry, it was fiercely opposed by all UK trade unions. Alan Bogg, professor of labour law at the University of Oxford, described the act as authoritarian.

== Provisions ==
The act of the act introduced a new requirement of 50% of union members to vote in a ballot for strike action. It amended TULRCA 1992 section 226(2).

The act requires that workers in certain services (including health, school education, fire, transport, nuclear decommissioning and border security) must gain at least 40% support of those entitled to vote in a workplace for a strike to be legal.

It amended TULRCA by adding new subsections 226(2A)–(2F). This 40% is a floor on the size of a pro-industrial-action majority relative to the size of the union: a normal union can strike with (for example) 50% turnout and 26% support for a strike,

Certain unions for public-sector workers would require either higher turnout (e.g. 75% turnout, with 40% of the members voting in support, 35% voting in opposition and 25% not voting) or striking to win a landslide victory (e.g. 50% turnout, 40% voting Yes, 10% voting No and 50% not voting).

The legislation includes a requirement to review electronic balloting demanded by the House of Lords, during its passage through Parliament, since the existing law mandated the process of postal voting. The review was launched in November 2016.

The act includes a limitation on the right to take industrial action after a strike ballot to six months or nine months if an employer agrees.

The act required clearer descriptions of trade union disputes on ballot papers.

The act gave additional powers to certification officers to ensure rules are followed.

The act increased the notice period for industrial action in cases where the employer disagrees to 14 days.

The act required union members to opt in to a political fund, with a requirement for unions to publish details on how this money is spent.

== Significance ==
The requirement in Section 2 for a 50% turnout means, in certain circumstances, those members who are not in favour of industrial action are better off not voting than voting "No".

Take for example the PCS Union pay ballot held in July 2018, which produced the following result:

- Yes 50,726 (85.6%)
- No 8,528 (14.4%)
- Turnout 41.6%

Under previous legislation, this would have been sufficient for the union to call a strike, but there would have needed to be approximately 12,000 additional votes cast in this ballot to reach the 50% turnout threshold. As we can see from the landslide result, even if all 12,000 had voted "No", "Yes" would still have had a significant majority. So, if at least 12,000 of those who did not vote would have voted "No", they have successfully achieved their aim of preventing the union calling a strike by not voting whereas casting a "No" vote would have allowed "Yes" to act.

== See also ==
- United Kingdom labour law
