= Trade Union Act 1913 =

Act of the Parliament of the United Kingdom

Trade Union Act 1913 (Note: Section 8.)
- Act of Parliament
- Parliament of the United Kingdom
- Long title: An Act to amend the Law with respect to the objects and powers of Trade Unions.
- Citation: 2 & 3 Geo. 5. c. 30
- Territorial extent: United Kingdom

Dates
- Royal assent: 7 March 1913
- Commencement: 7 March 1913 (Note: The Acts of Parliament (Commencement) Act 1793.)
- Repealed: 16 October 1992
Other legislation
Amended by	Trade Union and Labour Relations Act 1974; Employment Protection Act 1975; Employment Protection (Consolidation) Act 1978; Employment Act 1988
Repealed by	Trade Union and Labour Relations (Consolidation) Act 1992

Status: Repealed

Text of statute as originally enacted

Revised text of statute as amended

The Trade Union Act 1913 (2 & 3 Geo. 5. c. 30) was an act of the Parliament of the United Kingdom passed by the Liberal British Government under Prime Minister H. H. Asquith to remedy the situation caused by the 1909 Osborne Judgment, and gave unions the right to divide their subscriptions into a political and a social fund. If union members objected to these political contributions they could contract out of the payment.

== Subsequent developments ==
The whole act was repealed by the section 300(1) of, and schedule 1 to, the Trade Union and Labour Relations (Consolidation) Act 1992, which came into force on 16 October 1992.
