= Trade Union and Labour Relations (Consolidation) Act 1992 =

Act of the Parliament of the United Kingdom

Trade Union and Labour Relations (Consolidation) Act 1992 (Note: Section 303.)
- Act of Parliament
- Parliament of the United Kingdom
- Long title: An Act to consolidate the enactments relating to collective labour relations, that is to say, to trade unions, employers' associations, industrial relations and industrial action.
- Citation: 1992 c. 52
- Introduced by: Lord Mackay of Clashfern, Lord High Chancellor of Great Britain (Lords)
- Territorial extent: England and Wales; Scotland (except section 212A(6)); Northern Ireland (in part); (Note: Section 301.)

Dates
- Royal assent: 16 July 1992
- Commencement: 16 October 1992 (Note: Section 302.)
Other legislation
Amends	See § Repealed enactments; House of Commons Disqualification Act 1975
Repeals/revokes	See § Repealed enactments
Amended by	Trade Union Reform and Employment Rights Act 1993; Pension Schemes Act 1993; Value Added Tax Act 1994; Goods Vehicles (Licensing of Operators) Act 1995; Trade Union and Labour Relations (Northern Ireland) Order 1995; Employment Tribunals Act 1996; Employment Rights Act 1996; Employment Rights (Dispute Resolution) Act 1998; Petroleum Act 1998; Public Interest Disclosure Act 1998; Employment Relations Act 1999; Statute Law (Repeals) Act 2004; National Health Service (Consequential Provisions) Act 2006; Co-operative and Community Benefit Societies Act 2014; Trade Union Act 2016; Seafarers (Transnational Information and Consultation, Collective Redundancies and Insolvency Miscellaneous Amendments) Regulations 2018; Employment (Allocation of Tips) Act 2023; Strikes (Minimum Service Levels) Act 2023; Employment Rights Act 2025

Status: Amended

Text of statute as originally enacted

Revised text of statute as amended

Text of the Trade Union and Labour Relations (Consolidation) Act 1992 as in force today (including any amendments) within the United Kingdom, from legislation.gov.uk.

The Trade Union and Labour Relations (Consolidation) Act 1992 (c. 52) is an act of the Parliament of the United Kingdom which regulates United Kingdom labour law. The act applies in full in England and Wales and in Scotland, and partially in Northern Ireland.

The law contained in the act (TULRCA 1992) has existed in more or less the same form since the Trade Disputes Act 1906 (6 Edw. 7. c. 47). Underneath a mass of detail, four main principles can be found in the main parts of the act. The act's effect is to

- define trade unions and state they are the subjects of legal rights and duties
- protect the right of workers to organise into, or leave, a union without suffering discrimination or detriment
- provide a framework for a union to engage in collective bargaining for better workplace or business standards with employers
- protect the right of workers in a union to take action, including strike action and industrial action short of a strike, to support and defend their interests, when reasonable notice is given, and when that action is "in contemplation or furtherance of a trade dispute"

== Background ==
The act was a major recodification of acts passed since 1980 that had reduced the freedom of workers to organise, collectively bargain, and take collective action. Before 1979, the Trade Union and Labour Relations Act 1974 had set the basic structure, which had itself reversed the major overhaul of the Industrial Relations Act 1971. Each new piece of legislation tightened regulation of trade union activity, and expanded employer power.

By contrast, the historical regulation of unions by Parliament had been expansive, in contrast to the courts, beginning with the Trade Union Act 1871 (34 & 35 Vict. c. 31). After a number of cases imposing economic torts for unions taking action, the Trade Disputes Act 1906 (6 Edw. 7. c. 47) confirmed that unions should be free to conduct collective bargaining without the interference of the judiciary.

== Part I, Trade unions ==
Chapter I, sections 1 to 9, outlines the meaning of independent trade unions. Chapter II, sections 10 to 23, elaborates on the legal status of trade unions and their rights and duties in possessing property and being sued in court. Chapter III, sections 24 to 45, concern internal administration requirements of a union, such as the duty to make accounts and get audits, and the duty to supply a copy of the rule book to any person for a reasonable price. Chapter IV, sections 46 to 56A, involves the procedures for union representatives to be elected. Chapter V, sections 62 to 70, sets out the rights of trade union members to a ballot before any strikes, access to courts, disciplinary procedures, subscriptions and leaving the union. Chapters VI to VIIA, sections 71 to 108C, involve rules restricting the donation of union funds for political purposes and the payment of contributions to a union. Chapter IX, sections 117 to 121, is a number of miscellaneous provisions and definitions.

Part II consists of a single section 122, which defines the term "employer association".

== Part III, Union activity rights ==
Sections 137 to 177 detail the rights that a person has when participating in union activities.

It bans agreements or terms in employment contracts which require, prohibit, or discriminate on the basis of union membership (i.e. requiring open shops).

== Part IV, Industrial relations ==
ACAS is the primary arbitration service for disputes in UK workplaces.

Chapter I, sections 178 to 187, involves the ground rules for collective bargaining. Section 179 provides that a collective agreement is deemed to be not legally enforceable unless it is in writing and contains an explicit provision asserting that it should be legally enforceable. This reflects the tradition in British industrial relations policy of legal abstentionism from workplace disputes.

Section 186 states that a trade union recognition requirement in a contract for the supply of goods or services is void. This clause was added to the bill in the House of Lords in response to local authority practices, specifically in East Kilbride District Council, obliging their contractors to recognise and negotiate with trade unions.

Chapter II, sections 188 to 196 sets out the procedures that an employer must follow if there are known to be a possibility of many redundancies in the workplace. The duty of an employer is to inform and consult with the union (or if there is no union, elected representatives of the employees) with a view to minimising potential redundancies and ameliorating the effects on the workforce. The duty to consult arises at a minimum of 90 days before the redundancies are contemplated, if there would be over 100 employees dismissed. If the number is under 100, but over 20, then the employer must begin consultations 30 days before. There is no duty for collective consultation if the number of redundancies would be under 20 people, though an employer will still be bound by provisions in the employees' individual contracts, and the duty to give reasonable notice in ERA 1996 section 86. If redundancies are unforeseeable, when consultation could not be reasonably done in time, then section 188(7) absolves the employer of the need to pay compensation. Otherwise, failure to properly consult means the employer must pay one week's wages to each employee for each week missed.

Chapters III and IV, sections 199 to 218, set out the functions of the Advisory, Conciliation and Arbitration Service (ACAS) and its power to issue codes of practice.

== Part V, Industrial action ==
Part V, sections 219 to 246, contain the central rules regarding the ability of trade unions to organise and take part in industrial action, including strike action. These rules are interpreted in accordance with the Article 11 of the European Convention on Human Rights which protects the freedom of association, which is itself inspired by the predecessors to TULRCA 1992 in the United Kingdom.

Section 219 contains out the historical immunity of trade unions to support their ability to be involved in collective bargaining, that have existed since the Trade Disputes Act 1906. Section 219 states that a trade union is not liable to an employer or other party for economic loss which may be caused "in contemplation or furtherance of a trade dispute".

Section 224 places a prohibition on secondary strike action.

Sections 226 to 235 contain the requirements of a union to conduct a ballot and give notice to the employer of any industrial action that is agreed upon. Section 226 requires that there is a ballot, unless, according to section 226C there are under 50 workers entitled to vote. Under section 226A, a sample ballot paper must be given to the employer 3 days before the vote takes place and 7 days notice must be given, with information on which employees are taking part in the vote. Section 226B requires that the vote may be scrutinised, and any costs for this must be to be paid for by union (cf Employment Rights Act 1999 s. 228A). The vote must be equal, there must be separate ballots for each workplace establishment, and the question put to members about industrial action must be framed in a simple "yes" or "no" fashion. Moreover, section 229(4) requires the union to tell the workforce that any industrial action potentially infringes their contracts of employment, but also that they will be protected by unfair dismissal law. Employers do not pay for the costs, so unions themselves must pay for the cost of the ballot and any outcome must be immediately publicised.

A potential and dangerous pitfall is that if a vote involves a procedural defect, it is at risk of being invalidated. This is so if any member is denied the vote, though small accidental failures may be disregarded. A person must be specified in advance to announce the ballot results, and unions may not endorse any result of the vote until that has happened. The ballot only gives four weeks to the union to take action, though this period may be extended with the employers' consent, which is common if collective negotiations are ongoing. If all else has failed, then for industrial action to commence the union must under section 234A(4) give at least seven days' notice, accompanied with details of the workers to take part.

Part VI, sections 247 to 272, contain administrative provisions relating to Acas and the Central Arbitration Committee.

Section 220 protects workers taking part in industrial action, including picketers who are acting in connection with an industrial dispute at or near their workplace who are using their picketing to peacefully obtain or communicate information or peacefully persuading any person to work or abstain from working.

== Part VII, Miscellaneous and general ==
Part VII, sections 273 to 299 contains miscellaneous provisions and definitions, in particular definitions of terms relating to employment that would not normally apply in the context of employment by the Crown, the Houses of Parliament etc. to enable courts to apply them to such workers. It also excludes any classes of worker that a Minister of the Crown certifies as excluded "for the purpose of safeguarding national security", and places the burden of proof on a complainant to prove such a certificate is invalid. Members of the armed forces and police are expressly excluded, as are share fishermen (those remunerated from a share of the profits) and those employed abroad. Members of the intelligence services are excluded following policy dating back to the premiership of Margaret Thatcher (see Council of Civil Service Unions v Minister for the Civil Service).

Section 288 voids most contract terms that would "contract out" any rights protected by the 1992 Act.

Section 295 contains the meaning of "employee" as a person with a "contract of service" and section 296 states a "worker" is someone with a contract to personally perform work who is not a professional client.

=== Repealed enactments ===
Section 300(1) of the act repealed 37 enactments, listed in schedule 1 to the act. These include the Trade Union Act 1913, the Industrial Courts Act 1919, the Trade Disputes and Trade Unions Act 1946, the Trade Union (Amalgamations, &c.) Act 1964, the Trade Union and Labour Relations Act 1974, the Trade Union and Labour Relations (Amendment) Act 1976, the Trade Union Act 1984, and parts of many others.

== Schedule A1 ==
Schedule A1 sets out a complicated and detailed procedure for statutory recognition of a trade union by an employer. This was introduced by the Employment Relations Act 1999 section 1 and Schedule 1, one of the modifications of the original 1992 Act. The statutory recognition procedure is triggered if a union representing at least 10% of the members of a bargaining unit requests it. The Central Arbitration Committee (CAC) has the options of declaring the union to be recognised if the CAC judges the union to represent more than half the bargaining unit members, or can require a ballot, in which case the union is recognised if a quorum of at least 40% of the bargaining unit members vote and a majority of the voters favour recognition.

== See also ==
- United Kingdom labour law
- Trade Union Freedom Bill

== Bibliography ==
- Ewan McGaughey, A Casebook on Labour Law. London: Hart, 2019; chs. 8–10 ISBN 9781849469302
