= Nigel Clifford =

British businessman (born 1959)

Nigel Clifford CBE FRGS FRSA
- Born: June 1959 (age 67)
- Education: Portsmouth Grammar School; Downing College, Cambridge; University of Strathclyde (MBA)
- Occupation: Businessman
- Employer(s): British Telecom; Glasgow Royal Infirmary; Symbian Ltd. Micro Focus International; Procserve; Marlin Equity Partners; Cable & Wireless plc Tertio; Geospatial Commission; Royal Geographical Society; Lincoln College, Oxford

Nigel Richard Clifford, CBE (born June 1959) is a British businessman and academic administrator who is the 40th Rector of Lincoln College, Oxford. He is formerly president of the Royal Geographical Society, the deputy chair of the UK's Geospatial Commission, and operating executive for Marlin Equity Partners.

He formerly held several chief executive and senior positions, mainly in technology companies. He has also been chief executive of Great Britain's Ordnance Survey and Glasgow Royal Infirmary NHS Trust.

== Early life ==
Nigel Clifford was born in June 1959. He attended Portsmouth Grammar School before obtaining a degree from Downing College, Cambridge in Geography and an MBA from the University of Strathclyde.

== Career ==
He worked for British Telecom in a variety of roles from 1981 to 1992. He was chief executive of Glasgow Royal Infirmary NHS Trust from 1992 to 1998. From 1998 to 2000 he was service delivery director at Cable & Wireless plc. He was chief executive of Tertio from 2000 to 2005.

From 2005 to 2008 he was chief executive of Symbian Ltd. (a joint venture of handset vendors) which was eventually sold and integrated into Nokia in 2008. He was technology director at Nokia in 2009 and chief executive of Micro Focus International from 2010 to 2011. He was CEO of Procserve, a cloud based e-commerce network, from 2012 to 2015 until its sale to Basware.

He has held non-executive director positions at Anite, and Alliance Pharma.

He was chief executive officer of Ordnance Survey, Great Britain's national mapping agency, from 2015 to 2018 before joining Marlin Equity Partners as Operating Executive until 2023. From 2018 to 2023 he was deputy chair of the Geospatial Commission, part of the Cabinet Office. From 2021 to 2024 he was President of the Royal Geographical Society.

In July 2023, he was elected as the next rector of Lincoln College, Oxford. He succeeded Henry Woudhuysen as the college's 40th rector in September 2024. He is Deputy Chair of the Conference of Colleges and Member of the University Council.

== Honours ==
Nigel Clifford was appointed an honorary fellow of Downing College, Cambridge in 2025.

He was appointed Commander of the Order of the British Empire (CBE) for services to Geography and to Geospatial Data Services in the King's New Year Honours 2026.

== Professional memberships ==
CGeog – Chartered Geographer, Royal Geographical Society
FRSA - Fellow of The Royal Society of Arts
FCMI - Fellow of the Chartered Management Institute
FRGS - Fellow of the Royal Geographical Society

== Personal life ==
He is married and has three adult children. His personal interests include fell-walking, running, and kayaking.
