= 2010 UK quango reforms =

UK government initiative

Following the 2010 general election, the UK Government under the Cameron–Clegg coalition announced plans to curb public spending through the abolition of a large number of quasi-autonomous non-governmental organisations (quangos). This was styled in the national press as a "bonfire of the quangos", making reference to Girolamo Savonarola's religiously inspired Bonfire of the Vanities ("falò delle vanità").

On 23 May 2010, Chancellor of the Exchequer George Osborne unveiled a £500 million plan to reduce the budget deficit by abolishing or merging many quangos. The cuts and closures received criticism in some quarters, but was generally welcomed by the business community. A decade later in 2021, the UK Parliament’s Public Accounts Committee claimed in a report that the reforms “failed to spark” and that the Cabinet Office has “not been enforcing the code for public appointments”.

== Categorisation of reform ==
On 14 October 2010, the government released a document Public Bodies Reform – Proposals for Change outlining plans for each quango. The document broadly classified each quango into one of four groups:

Retain
the government thought it expedient to retain the organisation
Merge
the organisation would be merged with another organ of state or its function could be replicated by a third sector organisation
Abolish
the organisation would be abolished
Under consideration
firm plans were not drawn up for organisations in this category, but deadlines were set for complete consideration.

The document also contained a description of which ministry of state or government department the organisation was part of.

== Quangos to be abolished ==
The Department for Business, Innovation and Skills

- Aircraft and Shipbuilding Industries Arbitration Tribunal
- British Shipbuilders
- Union Modernisation Fund Supervisory Board

The Cabinet Office

- Office for Civil Society Advisory Body
- Communities and Local Government
- Advisory Panel for the Local Innovation Awards Scheme

The Department for Communities and Local Government

- National Housing and Planning Advice Unit
- National Tenant Voice
- Standards Board for England

The Department for Culture, Media and Sport

- Advisory Council on Libraries
- Legal Deposit Advisory Panel

The Department of Energy and Climate Change

- Advisory Committee on Carbon Abatement Technologies
- Renewables Advisory Board

The Department for Environment, Food and Rural Affairs

- Advisory Committee on Organic Standards
- Agricultural Dwelling House Advisory Committees
- Agricultural Wages Board for England and Wales
- Agricultural Wages Committees
- Animal Health and Welfare Strategy England Implementation Group
- Committee on Agricultural Valuation
- Commons Commissioners
- Expert Panel on Air Quality Standards
- Food from Britain
- Inland Waterways Advisory Council
- Royal Commission on Environmental Pollution

The Department for Education

- Teachers TV Board of Governors

The Foreign and Commonwealth Office

- Caribbean Board
- Government Hospitality Advisory Committee for the Purchase of Wine

The Ministry of Justice

- Administrative Justice and Tribunals Council
- Courts boards
- Legal Services Ombudsman
- Public Guardian Board
- Victim's Advisory Panel
- Youth Justice Board for England and Wales
- Animal Welfare Advisory Committee

The Department for Transport

- Railway Heritage Committee

== Quangos to be abolished with reservations ==
Some or all functions of these quangos was to be transferred to civil service, local government, other quangos, expert committees, charity or the private sector.

The Department for Business, Innovation and Skills

- British Nuclear Fuels Limited
- Competition Service
- Copyright Tribunal
- Design Council
- Hearing Aid Council
- NESTA
- Regional development agencies
- BIS SITPRO Limited
- Strategic Advisory Board for Intellectual Property
- Waste Electrical and Electronic Equipment Advisory Body

The Cabinet Office

- Civil Service Appeal Board
- Commission for the Compact
- Government Strategic Marketing Advisory Board
- Main Honours Advisory Committee
- Security Commission

The Department for Communities and Local Government

- Advisory Panel on Standards for the Planning Inspectorate
- Audit Commission for Local Authorities and the National Health Service in England
- Community Development Foundation
- Firebuy
- Infrastructure Planning Commission
- London Thames Gateway Development Corporation
- Olympic Park Legacy Company Limited
- Rent Assessment Panels / Residential Property Tribunal Service
- The Office for Tenants and Social Landlords
- Thurrock Development Corporation
- Valuation Tribunal for England
- Valuation Tribunal Service
- West Northamptonshire Development Corporation

The Department for Culture, Media and Sport

- Advisory Committee on Historic Wreck Sites
- Advisory Committee on National Historic Ships
- Advisory Committee on the Government Art Collection
- Football Licensing Authority
- Horserace Totalisator Board
- Museums, Libraries and Archives Council
- Public Lending Right
- The Theaters Trust
- UK Film Council

The Department for Environment, Food and Rural Affairs

- Advisory Committee on Hazardous Substances
- Advisory Committee on Packaging
- Advisory Committee on Pesticides
- Air Quality Expert Group
- British Waterways
- Commission for Rural Communities
- Darwin Advisory Committee
- Farm Animal Welfare Council
- National Standing Committee on Farm Animal Genetic Resources
- Pesticide Residues Committee
- Spongiform Encephalopathy Advisory Committee
- Veterinary Residues Committee
- Zoos Forum

Department for Education

- British Educational Communications and Technology Agency
- General Teaching Council for England
- Qualifications and Curriculum Development Agency
- School Food Trust

The Department of Health

- Advisory Board on the Registration of Homeopathic Products
- Advisory Committee on Antimicrobial Resistance and Healthcare Associated Infections
- Advisory Committee on Borderline Substances
- Advisory Committee on Dangerous Pathogens
- Advisory Committee on the Safety of Blood, Tissues and Organs
- Advisory Group on Hepatitis
- Alcohol Education and Research Council
- Appointments Commission
- Committee on Carcogenicity of Chemicals in Food, Consumer Products and the Environment
- Committee on Medical Effects of Air Pollutants
- Committee on Medical Aspects of Radiation in the Environment
- Committee on Mutagenicity of Chemicals in Food, Consumer Products and the Environment
- Committee on the Safety of Devices
- Council for Healthcare Regulatory Excellence
- Expert Advisory Group on AIDS
- Gene Therapy Advisory Committee
- General Social Care Council
- Genetics and Insurance Committee
- Health Protection Agency
- Herbal Medicines Advisory Committee
- Human Fertilisation and Embryology Authority
- Human Genetics Commission
- Human Tissue Authority
- Independent Advisory Group on Sexual Health and HIV
- Independent Review Panel for the Classification of Borderline Products
- Independent Review panel on the Advertising of Medicines
- Joint Committee on Vaccination and Immunisation
- National Information Governance Board for Health and Social Care
- National Joint Registry Steering Committee
- Scientific Advisory Committee on Nutrition

The Ministry of Justice

- Chief Coroner of England and Wales / Chief Coroner's Office
- Crown Court Rule Committee
- H.M. Inspectorate of Court Administration
- Legal Services Commission
- Magistrates' Courts Rule Committee
- Security Industry Authority
- Women's National Commission

The Department for Transport

- BRB (Residuary) Limited
- Cycling England
- Renewable Fuels Agency

The Department for Work and Pensions

- Child Maintenance and Enforcement Commission
- Disability Employment Advisory Committee
- Disability Living Allowance / Attendance Allowance Advisory Board

== Quangos to be merged ==
The Department for Business, Innovation and Skills

- Ofcom
- Central Arbitration Committee
- Certification Office
- Competition Commission
- Office of Fair Trading
- Postal Services Commission

The Department for Culture, Media and Sport

- Gambling Commission
- National Lottery Commission
- UK Sport
- Sport England

The Ministry of Justice

- Advisory Committee on Justices of the Peace
- Advisory Council on Historical Manuscripts
- Advisory Council on Public Records
- Crown Prosecution Service
- Revenue and Customs Prosecutions Office
- Serious Organised Crime Agency

The Department for Work and Pensions

- Pensions Ombudsman
- Pensions Protection Fund Ombudsman

== Quangos to be reviewed ==
The Department for Business, Innovation and Skills

- Engineering Construction Industry Training Board
- Film Industry Training Board
- Insolvency Practitioners Tribunal
- Local Better Regulation Office - dissolved on 1 April 2012, its functions taken over by the Better Regulation Delivery Office, an independent unit within the BIS.
- Office for Fair Access
- Student Loans Company
- UK Atomic Energy Authority
- UK Commission for Employment and Skills

The Cabinet Office

- Central Office of Information
- National School of Government
- The Leasehold Advisory Service

The Department for Culture, Media and Sport

- Commission for Architecture and the Built Environment

The Department for Environment, Food and Rural Affairs

- Agriculture and Horticulture Development Board
- Agricultural Land Tribunal
- Consumer Council for Water
- Plant Varieties and Seeds Tribunal
- Sea Fish Licence Tribunal
- Sustainable Development Commission

The Department of Education

- Children and Family Court Advisory and Support Service
- Children's Workforce Development Council
- National College for Leadership of Schools and Children's Services
- Partnerships for Schools
- School Support Staff Negotiating Body
- The Office of the Children's Commissioner
- Training and Development Agency for Schools
- Young People's Learning Agency Under consideration

The Foreign and Commonwealth Office

- Diplomatic Service Appeals Board
- Foreign Compensation Commission
- Great Britain China Centre
- UK India Round Table

The Ministry of Justice

- Advisory Panel on Public Sector Information
- Judicial Appointments Commission
- Judicial Appointments and Conduct Ombudsman

The Home Office

- Independent Safeguarding Authority
- Office of the Immigration Services Commissioner
- Police Advisory Board, Police Negotiating Board and Police Arbitration Tribunal
