= National Housing and Planning Advice Unit =

Non-departmental public body overview
- Formed: 2006 (officially launched June 2007)
- Dissolved: 28 June 2010
- Jurisdiction: England
- Headquarters: CB04. Ground Floor of Clerical Block Segensworth Road, Titchfield, Fareham PO15 5RR, England, United Kingdom
- Motto: Building Awareness For The Future
- Employees: 12
- Parent department: Department for Communities and Local Government
- Website: /http://www.communities.gov.uk/nhpau/

The National Housing and Planning Advice Unit (NHPAU) was a quasi-autonomous non-governmental organisation (officially termed a non-departmental public body) set up by the Government of the United Kingdom in 2006 and formally launched in June 2007, with the aim of advising the government on the impact of planned housing provision on affordability, and in an attempt to counteract the growing numbers of citizens who were struggling to get on the property ladder in England. The body was part of the Department for Communities and Local Government (DC&LG) and was abolished in the 2010 UK quango reforms.

== History ==
Founded in 2006 in response to increasing house prices, lack of affordable housing and as the result of the direct recommendation of Kate Barker’s March 2004 Review of Housing Supply, in which it was recommended that a body be created which could offer expert advice on housing matters, particularly that of affordability. Officially launched in June 2007, the body was originally chaired by Professor Stephen Nickell CBE, FBA (former warden of Nuffield College, Oxford), he held this role until November 2009 when Dr. Peter Williams became the body's chair. According to then Secretary of State Yvette Cooper, the body had a budget of £1,459,000 for its first year of operation in 2007/2008 and had twelve full time equivalent paid staff. The then secretary of state also gave details of the original board members, them being:

- Professor Stephen Nickell CBE FBA (Chair)
- Prof. Glen Bramley, Professor of Housing and Urban Planning, Heriot-Watt University
- Prof. Paul Cheshire, Professor of Economic Geography, LSE
- Bob Lane, Chief Executive for Catalyst Corby/North Northants Development Co.
- Max Steinberg, Chief Executive of Elevate East Lancashire
- Dr. Peter Williams, Independent consultant on housing and mortgage markets and housing policy and acts as executive director of the Intermediary Mortgage Lenders Association."

The body's original purpose was to advise government, planners and other regional bodies on the subject of housing affordability and on the consequences of different housing level provision when they carried out works pertaining to the provision of planned housing (which they had been required to do since April 2007), to conduct and commission research relating to the housing market to gain a greater understanding of the housing situation, and to assist in the implementation of Kate Barker's housing supply review . The unit's logo was designed by Lindsay Robertson of design collective Words and Stuff – the logo was designed to be a simple demonstration of the unit's functions – a speech bubble containing a graphical representation of a house; the unit aims to comment and advise on issues pertaining to housing so the logo was designed to reflect as such.

The unit's board met monthly to discuss the unit's currents performance and to steer it in the right direction. Initial board appointments were made on 1 November 2006 – appointments being made on behalf of Secretary of State for Communities and Local Government through open competition for a term of three years. These terms were extended in October 2009 for a further sixteen months, but Prof. Stephen Nickell chose to step down to 'concentrate on other interests', the office of chair was filled by existing board member Dr Peter Williams. The Chief Executive was Neil McDonald, who managed a team of technical professionals such as economists, statisticians, geographers or planners.Neil McDonald took over from the first Chief Executive Kevin Williamson who set up the unit.

The unit held a Parliamentary Reception in the House of Commons in May 2009 to raise awareness of the work carried out by the NHPAU, which was opened by David Drew. A review of the unit in autumn 2009 found that the organisation was performing well, and suggested it should also consider conducting research for local authorities into the housing market, improve the level of accessibility of the unit's publication and work closer with local bodies. In response to the review of the unit, and also to their paper published in February 2010 entitled Evaluating the requirements for market and affordable housing – which provides an alternative to expensive local income surveys, by providing model guidance on Strategic Housing Market Assessments – on 1 April 2010 a ministerial statement from the DC&LG announced that the NHPAU had a new, extended remit. The remit was expanded to enable the unit to work closer with local authorities, at local and sub-regional levels, and a new project was announced which will research whether the availability of low-cost housing could be affected by activities other than simply property building. Then Minister of State for Housing and Planning John Healey said that the changes will ensure "the unit will help to make sure that we build more homes and in the right places", and then chair of the unit Dr. Peter Williams went on to say this:

The local area is where sites are identified, planning decisions are made and the delivery pipeline managed. In short it is where homes are built. It is also where economic theory and demographic projections meet practical reality. The overriding aim of our Board and expert team will be to help local authorities and sub-regional bodies make the planning and delivery system for housing work in a way which makes a difference to housing need. This is vital if everyone is to have a home that meets their needs at a price they can afford

— Dr. Peter Williams, Chair of the National Housing and Planning Advice Unit

Shortly after the extension of the unit's remit, the 2010 general election was held, which saw a new Conservative and Liberal Democrat coalition government take office, which undertook the quango reforms (often referred to by the media as the bonfire of the quangos). As a result of these reforms, the NHPAU was listed for closure. The decision was announced on 28 June 2010, a DC&LG spokesperson stated that:

The government has decided to close the National Housing and Planning Advice Unit with immediate effect. This decision has been taken in order to rationalise the number of advisory bodies and to make savings.

— Department for Communities and Local Government

The DC&LG made clear that the closure did not in any way show a lack of commitment on housing or understanding of the important issue of housing affordability, but that it was a stage in moving away from a "bottom-up rather than top-down approach that allowed local communities to control the way in which villages, towns and cities developed through local plans". Eric Pickles, Secretary of State for Communities and Local Government, described former house-building targets as "soviet", and communications and public affairs manager Jamie Hodge of the Royal Town Planning Institute stated that the closure was "understandable" in the current economic climate, but praised the work of the unit for being "a reliable source of objective data, helping further understanding of housing supply and affordability".

According to Prof. Stephen Nickell in June 2007, by 2026 the average house price would rise to 10 times average earnings from the current 7 times.

== Published works ==
The following is a chronological list of works formally published by the NHPAU:
2007

- Affordability Matters – June 2007
- Developing a target range for the supply of new homes in England – October 2007

2008

- Buy-to-let mortgage lending and the impact on UK house prices: a technical report – February 2008
- Rapid evidence assessment of the research literature on the buy-to-let housing market sector – February 2008
- Buy-to-let mortgage lending and the impact on UK house prices (research findings 1) – February 2008
- Meeting the housing requirements of an aspiring and growing nation – June 2008
- Affordability still matters – July 2008
- Rapid evidence review of the research literature on the impact of worsening affordability – July 2008
- Impact of worsening affordability on the demand for social and affordable housing - tenure choice and household formation – July 2008
- Public attitudes towards the affordability of market housing (research findings 3) – July 2008
- NHPAU Annual report 2007/08 – July 2008
- Rapid Evidence Assessment of the Research Literature on the Purchase and Use of Second Homes – October 2008
- Measuring Housing Affordability: A review of data sources – December 2008 (minor update April 2009)

2009

- Housing requirements and the impact of recent economic and demographic change – May 2009
- Rapid Evidence Assessment of the economic and social consequences of worsening housing affordability – May 2009
- Affordability – More than just a housing problem – May 2009
- The Role of the Highways Agency, the Environment Agency and private utility companies in delivering new housing supply – May 2009
- More homes for more people: building the right homes in the right places – July 2009
- Public attitudes to housing 2009 – July 2009
- NHPAU annual report 2008/09 – July 2009
- Technical Appendix to More homes for more people: advice to Ministers on housing levels to be considered in regional plans – September 2009
- A guide to the Reading-CLG Affordability model – September 2009
- NHPAU Bulletin on Population projections – November 2009
- Review of European Planning Systems – December 2009

2010

- Housing Supply and Planning Controls: The impact of planning control processing times on housing supply in England – February 2010
- Housing affordability: A fuller picture – February 2010
- Evaluating requirements for market and affordable housing – February 2010
- How do housing price booms and busts affect home ownership for different birth cohorts? – February 2010
- The Implications of Housing Type/Size Mix and Density for the Affordability and Viability of New Housing Supply – March 2010
- Public attitudes to Housing 2010 – June 2010
- NHPAU annual report 2009/10 – July 2010
