= Community Infrastructure Fund =

Community Infrastructure Fund (CIF) is a UK government initiative created as a joint venture by the Department for Transport and the Ministry of Housing, Communities and Local Government, it was created following the recommendation of the Barker Review of Housing Supply.

CIF was created to fund transport schemes that would promote new housing and community growth, to date there have been two iterations of the scheme, CIF Round 1 and CIF Round 2. The total amount of funding being allocated through the Round 2 was £300 million, £100 million of which was to develop the Thames Gateway region, with schemes competing for the remaining £200 million. The total cost of all the bidding schemes was over £1.1 billion.
