= Lincoln College, Oxford =

College of the University of Oxford

Lincoln College
- University of Oxford
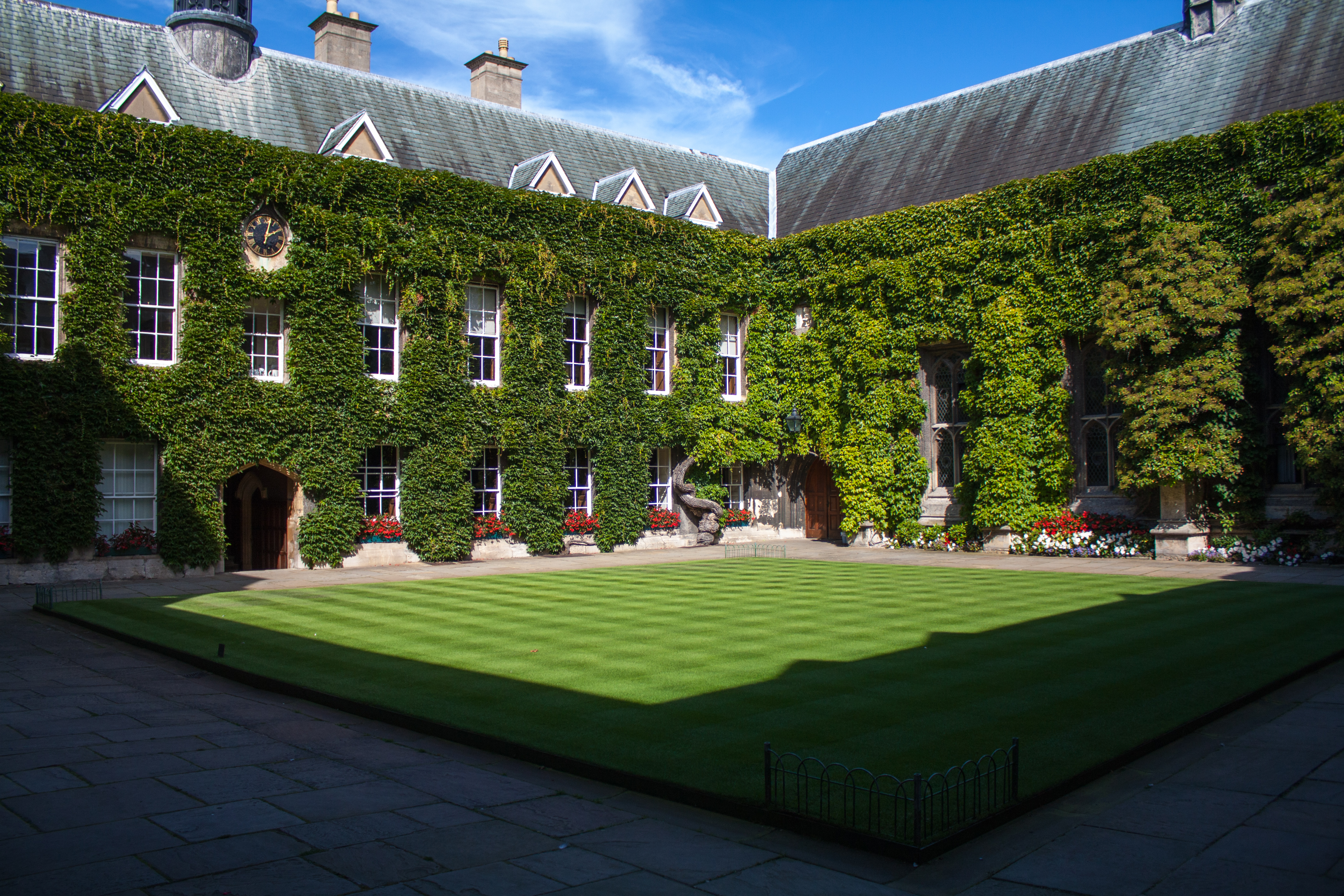
- The Front Quad of Lincoln College

- Arms: see below
- Location: Turl Street, Oxford OX1 3DR
- Coordinates: 51.75326°N 1.255905°W
- Full name: The College of the Blessed Mary and All Saints, Lincoln
- Latin name: Collegio Lincolnensi, Collegium Lincolniense
- Established: 1427; 599 years ago
- Named for: Richard Fleming (Bishop of Lincoln)
- Sister college: Downing College, Cambridge
- Rector: Nigel Clifford
- Undergraduates: 325 (Dec 2024)
- Postgraduates: 320
- Endowment: £122.4 million (2018)
- Website: www.lincoln.ox.ac.uk
- Boat club: Boat Club website

Map
- Location within Oxford city centre

Lincoln College (formally, The College of the Blessed Mary and All Saints, Lincoln) is one of the colleges of the University of Oxford. Lincoln was founded in 1427 by Richard Fleming, Bishop of Lincoln. The charter for it was issued by King Henry VI.

The college is situated on Turl Street in central Oxford and has three quadrangles. The first quadrangle dates from the 15th century, with the second Chapel quadrangle added in the early 17th century and The Grove added in the 19th century. The college library is located in the converted 18th-century All Saints' Church which became part of the college in 1971. Its sister college is Downing College, Cambridge. Mensa, the oldest high-IQ society in the world, was founded at the college in 1946.

The Rector of the college is former president of the Royal Geographical Society Nigel Clifford. Notable alumni include writers Theodor Seuss Geisel (Dr. Seuss) and David John Moore Cornwell (John le Carré), former British prime minister Rishi Sunak and Labour politicians Shabana Mahmood and Miatta Fahnbulleh. Past fellows include the founder of Methodism John Wesley, the physician John Radcliffe and antibiotics scientists Howard Florey, Edward Abraham, and Norman Heatley.

== History ==
=== Founding ===
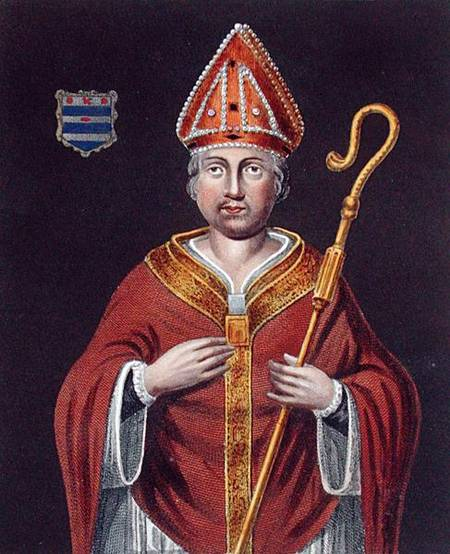
Richard Fleming, founder

Richard Fleming, the then Bishop of Lincoln, founded the college in order to combat the Lollard teachings of John Wyclif. He intended it to be "a little college of true students of theology who would defend the mysteries of Scripture against those ignorant laymen who profaned with swinish snouts its most holy pearls".. To this end, he obtained a charter for the college from King Henry VI, which combined the parishes of All Saints, St Michael at the North Gate, and St Mildred's within the college under a rector. The college now uses All Saints Church as its library and has strong ties with St Michael's Church at the North Gate, having used it as a stand-in for the college chapel when necessary.

Despite insufficient endowment and trouble from the Wars of the Roses (for their charter was from the deposed Lancastrian), the college has survived and flourished thanks to the efforts of its fellows and the munificence of a second bishop of Lincoln, Thomas Rotherham. Richard Fleming died in 1431, and the first rector, William Chamberleyn, in 1434, leaving the college with few buildings and little money. The second rector, John Beke, secured the college's safety by attracting donors. By 1436, the college had seven fellows. John Forest, Dean of Wells and a close friend of Beke's, donated such an amount that the college promised to recognise him as a co-founder; it did not keep this promise. His gifts saw the construction of a chapel, a library, hall and kitchen. After a pointed sermon from the incumbent rector, Thomas Rotherham was compelled to give his support and effectively re-founded it in 1478, with a new charter from King Edward IV.

=== 18th century ===
In the 18th century, Lincoln became the cradle of Methodism when John Wesley, a fellow there from 1726, held religious meetings with his brother Charles and the rest of Wesley's 'Holy Club', whom the rest of the university took to calling 'Bible-moths'. His appearances at College became less frequent after he departed for Georgia as a missionary chaplain in 1735. Indeed, he took to signing his publications as "John Wesley, Sometime Fellow of Lincoln College". A portrait of him hangs in the Hall, and a bust overlooks the front quad. The room where he is believed to have worked is also named after him, and was renovated by American Methodists at the beginning of the 20th century.

=== Rivalry ===
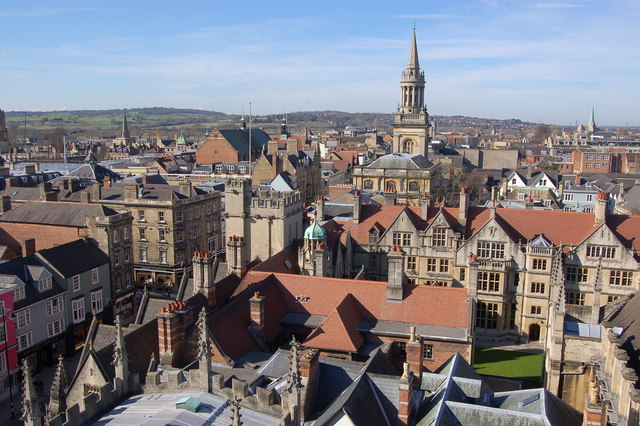
A view of Lincoln College Library Tower, formerly All Saints Church, with Brasenose College in the foreground

As is common with Oxford colleges, the college has a long-standing rivalry with neighbour Brasenose College (which was founded by a later bishop of Lincoln, William Smyth). The two colleges share a tradition revived annually on Ascension Day. The story goes that, centuries ago, as a mob chased students at the university through the town, the Lincoln porter allowed in the Lincoln students but refused entry to the Brasenose member, leaving him to the mercy of the mob. An alternative is that a Lincoln man bested a Brasenose man in a duel. Either episode resulted in the Brasenose student's death, and ever since, on Ascension Day, Lincoln College has invited in members of Brasenose College every year through the one door connecting the two colleges, for free beer as penance. Since the nineteenth century, the beer has been flavoured with ivy so as to discourage excessive consumption.

=== Modern day ===
Academically, Lincoln was one of the top ten in the Norrington Table each year from 2006 to 2015 (excluding 2010 and 2011). Lincoln ranked third in the Norrington Table in 2021 and second in 2022.

The college is associated with the Goblin Club, an exclusive all-male dining society founded in 1902. In May 2019, the JCR voted to extend a ban on the society on the grounds that it was perceived to be both elitist and racist.

In 1958, the college was the first in Oxford or Cambridge to provide a Middle Common Room exclusively for the use of graduate students. Like many of Oxford's colleges, Lincoln admitted its first mixed-sex cohort in 1979, after more than half a millennium as a men-only institution. The MCR is now located in the Berrow Foundation Building, which was inaugurated in 2014.

In 2007, the college took the rare step of unveiling a commissioned portrait of two members of staff who were not fellows or benefactors of the college, in commemoration of their work. Chef Jim Murden and butler Kevin Egleston have worked in the college's kitchen and buttery for 33 and 28 years respectively, as of 2010. Artist Daphne Todd was commissioned for the painting, who has had such previous sitters as the Grand Duke of Luxembourg and Spike Milligan.

As part of the college's commitment to environmental sustainability, a dedicated Green Impact team was set up in 2021, which has since won an Oxford University gold award. Biodiversity initiatives across the college's various properties have led to creation of a wild-flower garden outside the entrance to the college library.

== Architecture ==
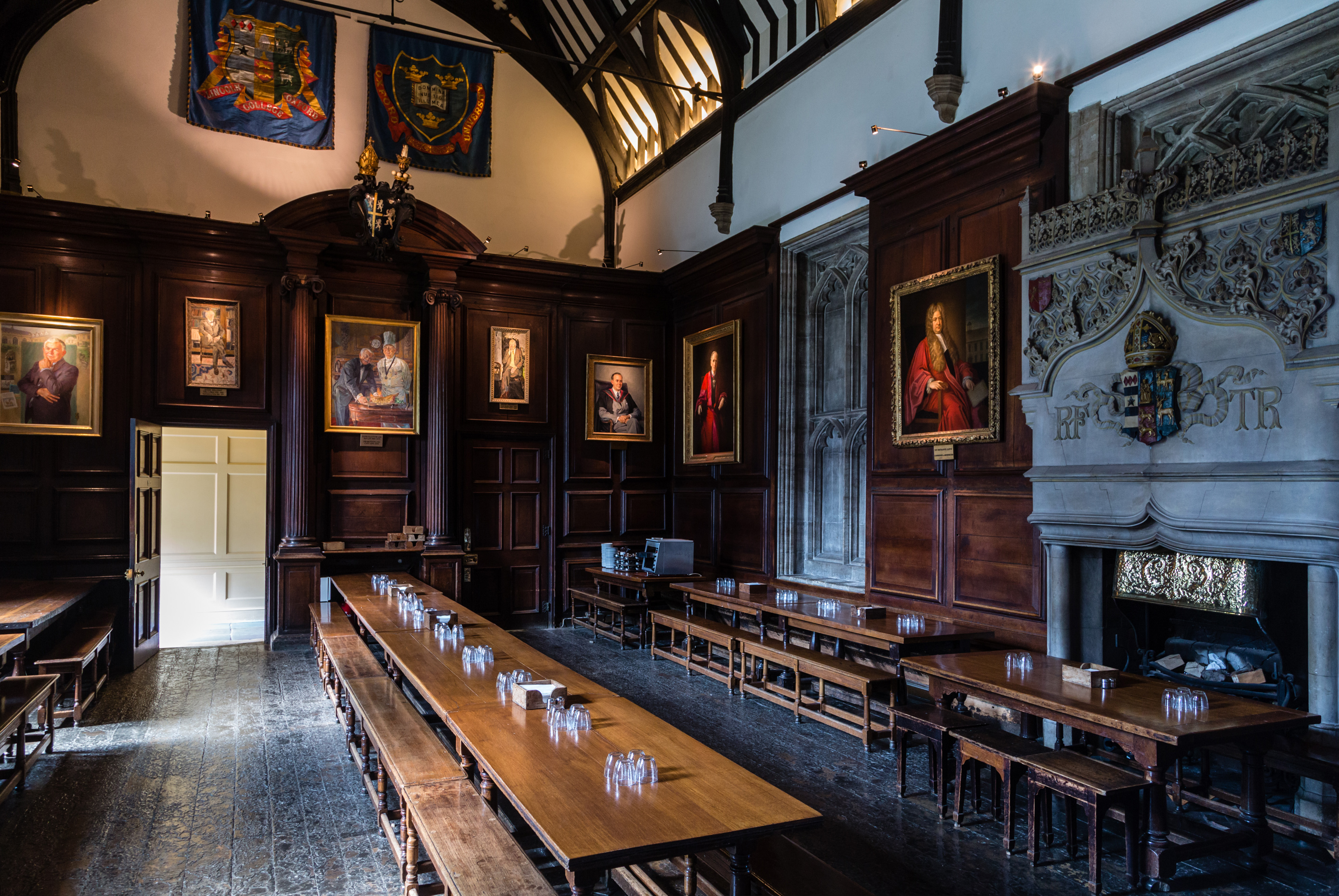
The college dining hall

According to Nikolaus Pevsner, Lincoln College preserves "more of the character of a 15th century college than any other in Oxford". This is mainly because both the façade to Turl Street and the front quad are still of only two storeys (although the parapets and battlements are of the 19th century). The college also owns most of the buildings across Turl Street from the college proper, in whole or in part, which chiefly contain student accommodation. The creeper that covers the college's front quad walls is Virginia creeper (Parthenocissus quinquefolia) – dark green in the summer through to scarlet in autumn, but bare in winter.

There are three quads: the Front Quad (15th century), the Chapel Quad (1608–1631) and The Grove (19th century), as well as a number of irregular spaces. Unlike many other colleges, all of the architecture of the college proper is stone and there is no modern accommodation annexe. To quote the Lincoln College Freshers' Handbook, "Unlike most colleges, we have no grotty sixties annexe to spoil all the pretty bits". The college bar, Deep Hall (or Deepers), is immediately below the great hall and used to be the college beer cellar. It is one of the oldest parts of the college, and the pillars inside it are perhaps the oldest feature of the college. The wine cellar is accessed through Deep Hall, and extends completely beneath the Grove.

The Rector's lodgings in Turl Street are neo-Georgian and were built in 1929–1930; they are reached from within college through a gate in Chapel Quad, but have a main door on Turl Street.

The college is known as being the setting for many literary works. C. P. Snow was inspired for his novel The Masters by the story of Mark Pattison, a fellow at Lincoln, whose enthusiastic hopes for Lincoln were frustrated by older, more conservative fellows of the college; Snow's story transposes the story to a Cambridge College. It was the setting for three episodes of Inspector Morse. Later, Lewis has used Turl Street in front of the college for filming. Lincoln College is the setting for much of the plot in Heresy by S.J. Parris (pseudonym for the literary critic Stephanie Merritt), a historical crime novel.

Lincoln College has one of the oldest working medieval kitchens in the UK.

=== Chapel ===
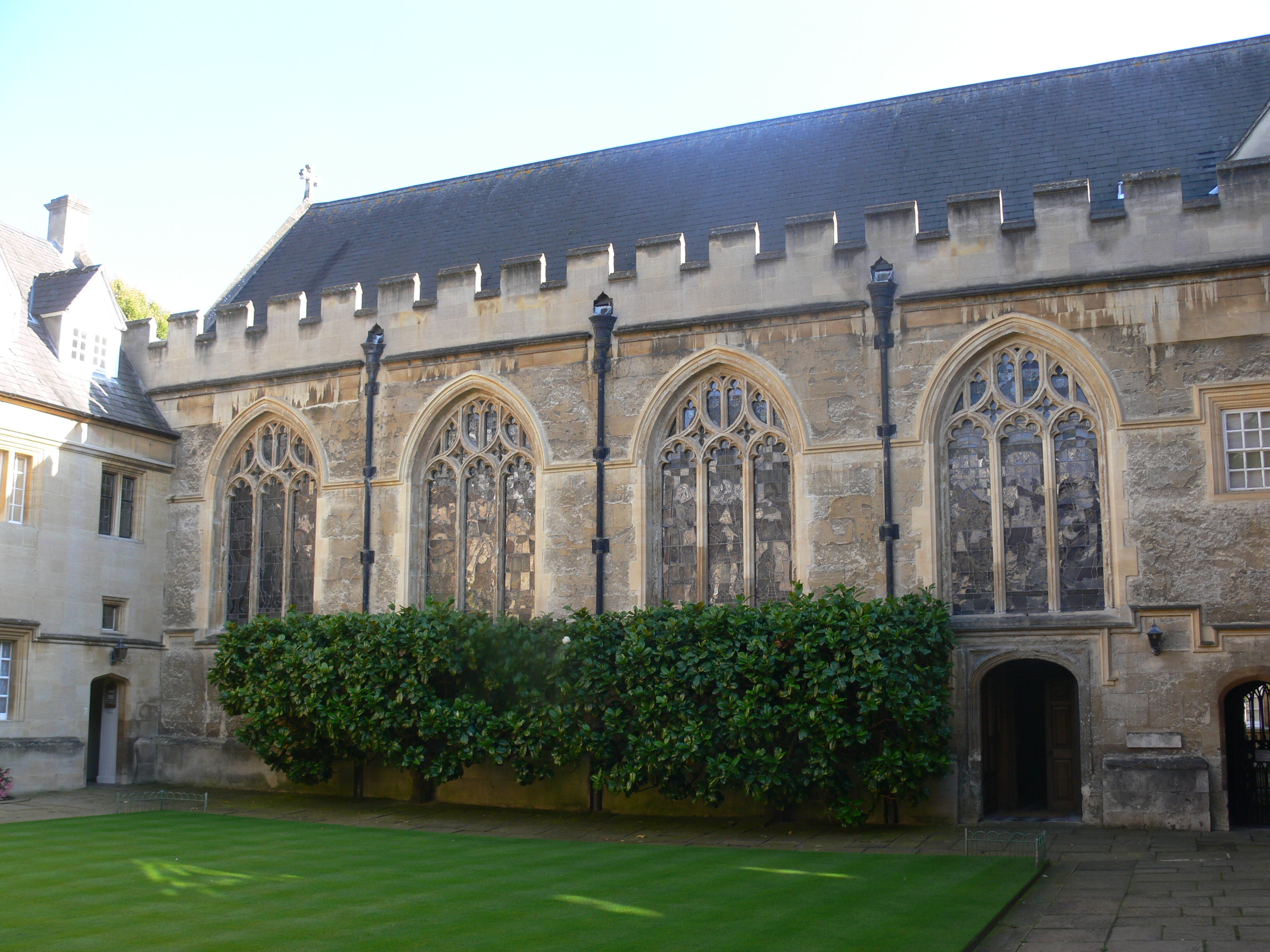
Chapel quad

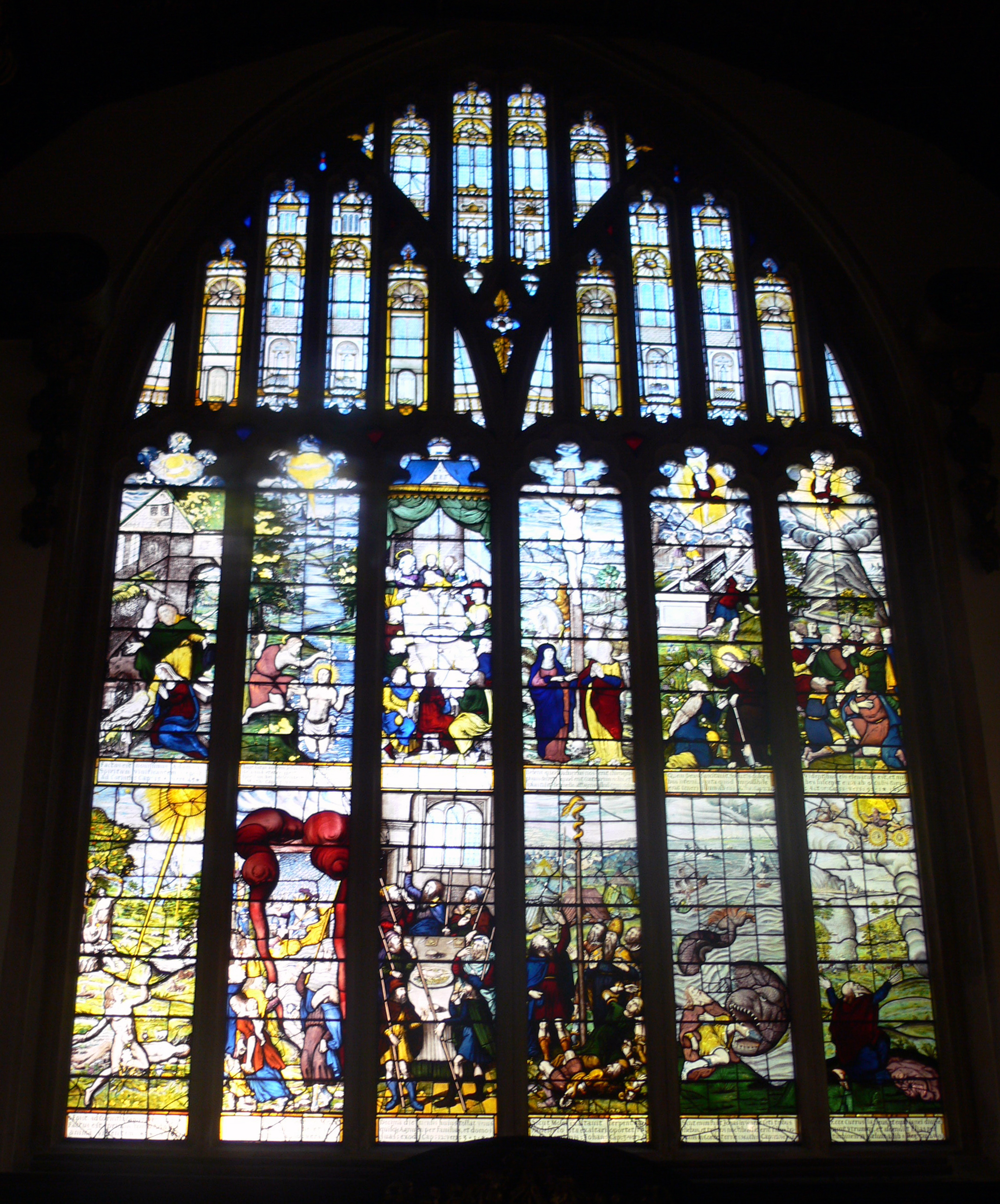
East window of the chapel

The college chapel was built in late perpendicular style between 1629 and 1631; its windows are enamelled rather than stained, which is a process of painting the windows then firing them, a complicated procedure. They are the work of Abraham van Linge, who was an expert in this technique. The east window of the chapel depicts twelve biblical scenes: the top six depict scenes from Jesus' life (including the Last Supper), whilst the six below depict corresponding scenes from the Old Testament (including Adam and Eve at Creation and the whale spitting out Jonah). The north windows show the Twelve Prophets, and the south windows the Twelve Apostles. The screen separating the ante-chapel (containing the organ) from the chapel proper is made of cedar, and reportedly filled the chapel with the strong scent of cedar for around the first one hundred years of its existence.

Much of the chapel was restored in a project beginning in 1999, having been deemed to be in unacceptable disrepair in the early 1990s, when a funding campaign began. The black slate and white marble tiles were repaired, cleaned and replaced where necessary, whilst most of the age damage was to be found in the woodwork, which was suffering greatly from poor ventilation and having been laid directly on to earth, resulting in worm and wet rot. Cracks in the enamel of the windows were also repaired where most obvious and disfiguring. The renovations were made with the intention of preserving the chapel's 17th-century character as much as possible. The chapel has remained much unchanged since the wooden figurines (of Saint Peter, Saint Paul, Moses and Aaron) were placed on the front pews and the carved ceiling was installed in the 1680s.

=== Library ===
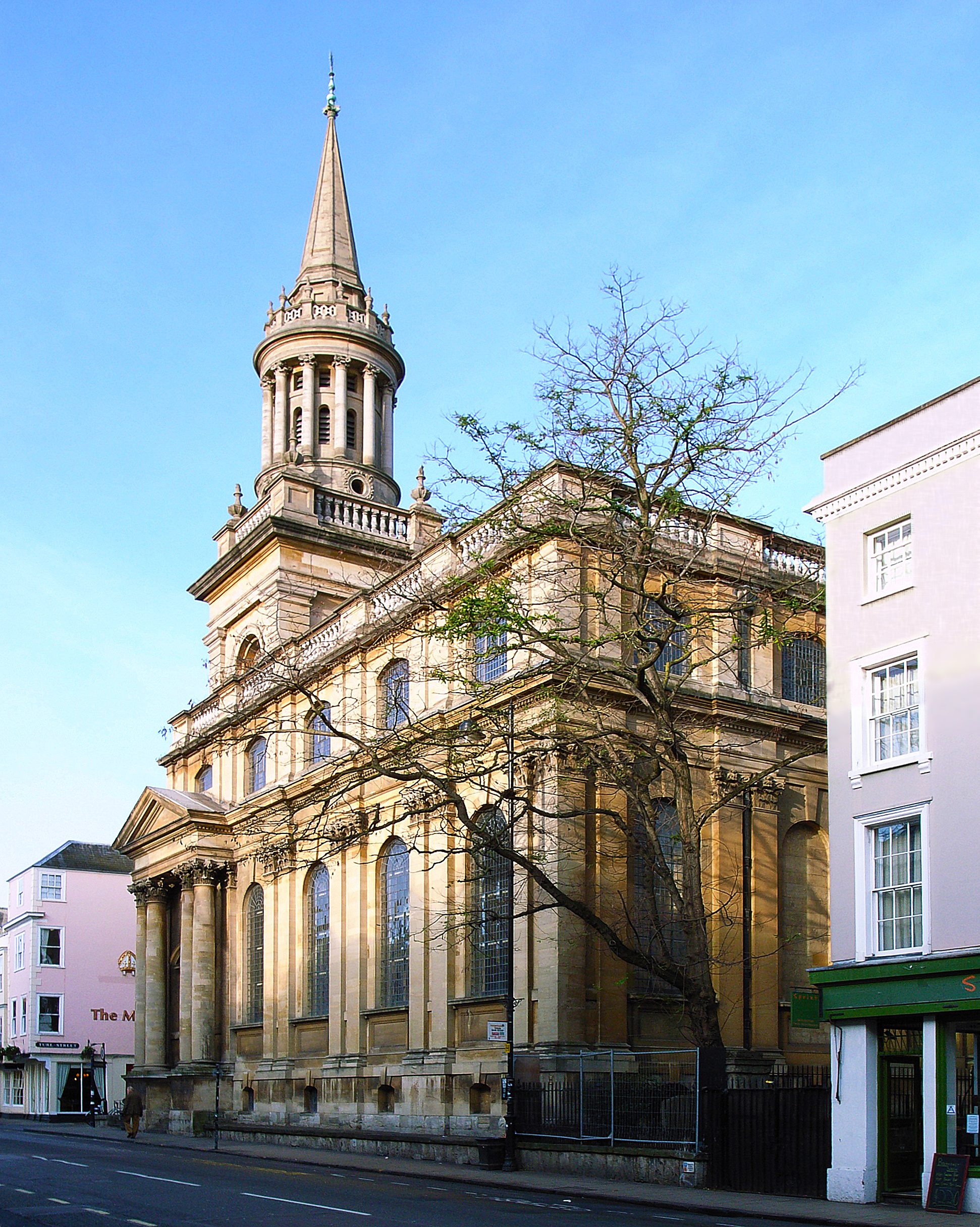
All Saints Church, now Lincoln College's library, on the High Street

Perhaps the college's most striking feature, its library, is located in the converted 18th-century All Saints Church handed over to the college in 1971. All Saints church tower is a feature of Oxford's skyline, one of the city's "dreaming spires". After the church spire collapsed in 1700, amateur architect and Dean of Christ Church Henry Aldrich designed a new church. It is believed, however, that on some of the later features of the church, particularly on the tower and spire, the work of Nicholas Hawksmoor, the Baroque architect, is to be found. The tower has a full peal of eight bells, which are regularly rung.

Its library holds some 60,000 books. Graduates and undergraduates are able to work in the building until 2.00 a.m. most nights; the Bodleian and faculty libraries have earlier closing times. It is kept up-to-date by regular purchases, and welcomes suggestions for books pertinent to studies. The upper reading room, or Cohen Room, has an elaborate plastered ceiling and the Senior Library (downstairs) holds some of the college's older books, including pamphlets from the English Civil War, Wesleyana, and plays dating from the late 17th and early 18th centuries, as well as a small collection of manuscripts. The science library is also to be found downstairs. Access to the library is generally restricted to current students and staff at the college, although alumni may use the library if acceptable justification is provided.

== Academic links ==
Lincoln College has visiting undergraduate student arrangements with Middlebury College, Simon's Rock College of Bard, Drew University, and National Taiwan University. The college also has ties to Middlebury College's Bread Loaf School of English, which runs a summer graduate course using Lincoln's facilities during the University of Oxford's long summer vacation. A clock donated by Middlebury stands in the Porters' Lodge.

== Traditions ==
=== Grace ===
The college grace is read aloud at every formal hall, usually by a student. To encourage readers, students who read the grace twice in a term receive a bottle of wine. The college grace is in Latin. (Note: Benignissime Pater, qui providentia tua regis, liberalitate pascis et benedictione conservas omnia quae creaveris, benedicas nobis, te quaesumus, et hisce creaturis in usum nostrum, ut illae sanctificatae sint et nobis salutares, et nos, inde corroborati, magis apti reddamur ad omnia opera bona; in laudem tui nominis aeterni, per Iesum Christum Dominum nostrum, Amen. (Translation: "Most gracious Father, who by thy providence rulest, in thy generosity feedest, and by thy blessing preservest all that thou hast created; bless us, we beseech thee, and these creatures for our use, so that they may be hallowed and of benefit to us, and we, strengthened thereby, may be rendered fitter for all good works; to the praise of thy eternal name, through Jesus Christ our Lord, Amen."))

=== Coat of arms ===
The College Coat of Arms

The college arms incorporate (1) the arms of Bishop Richard Fleming, the founder; (2) the arms of the See of Lincoln; (3) the arms of Bishop Thomas Rotherham, the second founder.

The blazon (description in formal heraldic terms) is: Tierced per pale, Barry of six argent and azure, in chief three lozenges gules, on the second bar of an argent a mullet pierced sable; Argent, thereon an escutcheon of Gules two lions passant guardant or, on a chief azure the Blessed Virgin Mary ducally crowned seated on a throne issuant from the chief, on her dexter arm the infant Jesus and holding in her sinister hand a sceptre, all gold: the escutcheon ensigned with a mitre azure garnished and stringed or; Vert, three stags statant two and one or.

== Student life ==
=== Accommodation ===
The college guarantees all undergraduates three years of college-owned accommodation. Similarly, virtually all graduate students are provided housing for the duration of their studies. The college's housing stock is extensive and centrally located. About 50 students live on the three quads described above, with over 100 more living in rooms above the shops on the other side of Turl Street. These include the Mitre rooms, formerly guest rooms of the Mitre Inn, which has been owned by the college since the 15th century. The accommodation was incorporated into the college in 1969, but the restaurants were left to the inn. Lincoln House, directly across from the college, was constructed in 1939 as an annexe. There were at one point vague plans for a bridge over Turl Street connecting the annexe to the college proper; these never materialised. Further accommodation is provided at Bear Lane (across High Street). Donors Emily and John Carr gave to the college numbers 113 and 114 on the High Street, with land extending back to Bear Lane, which the college still owns and which constitutes the Bear Lane accommodation.

On Museum Road near Keble College is a further accommodation complex. Here, 12 terraced houses are officially called Lincoln Hall, but most commonly referred to as 'Mus Road'. The EPA Science Centre, named after Edward Abraham, was constructed behind them in the early 21st century and contains apartment-style accommodation, teaching facilities and the college's archives. A number of outlying houses make up the remainder of the housing stock.

=== Junior Common Room ===
Due to Lincoln's small numbers and tight-knit community, its Junior Common Room (JCR) plays a greater role in student life than do the JCRs of most other colleges. JCR elections, held in Trinity and Michaelmas Terms, attract one of the highest turnouts of any Oxford college. The JCR, like all JCRs in Oxford, is both a communal room for undergraduates (with a television, kitchen, daily newspapers, a DVD library and sofas) as well as the name of the body that represents said undergraduates to the senior members of college and on a university-wide basis. All undergraduate members of the college are automatically members of the JCR, unless they specifically express a desire not to be a part of it. Honorary membership to others is sometimes extended, but have limited rights compared to other members.

The JCR is run by an Executive of ten officers, headed by the President, which is ultimately responsible for the JCR, whilst the JCR Committee comprises forty-two members and fulfils a wide range of duties, all aimed at the general improvement of the lives of and facilities available to the undergraduate body of the college. Members of the JCR Committee are elected by popular vote. Shabana Mahmood, the MP for Birmingham Ladywood, served as JCR president in 2000–2001. JCR meetings are held three times a term, in 2nd week, 5th week and 8th week of each.

The JCR was founded in 1854 as the Lincoln College Debating Society but was renamed in 1919 (although it continued to be referred to by its former name for some time after). From 1886, the society provided members of the Common Room with tobacco and cigarettes from its funds, as well as tea and coffee; however, "The President shall have the power to stop smoking while the Torpid [a rowing eight entering a regatta in Hilary Term] and the Eight [an eight entering a regatta in Trinity Term] are in training." Tobacco and cigarettes are no longer available from the JCR, but tea and coffee are to be found in the JCR kitchen.

=== Middle Common Room ===
The Lincoln MCR is the oldest (founded in 1960) of the Oxford MCRs. With around 350 graduate students in residence each year, the MCR organises a full and varied programme of meetings, social events and sporting activities during term time and vacations. The MCR is located in the Berrow Foundation Building, completed in 2016 by design studio Stanton Williams.

== People associated with Lincoln ==
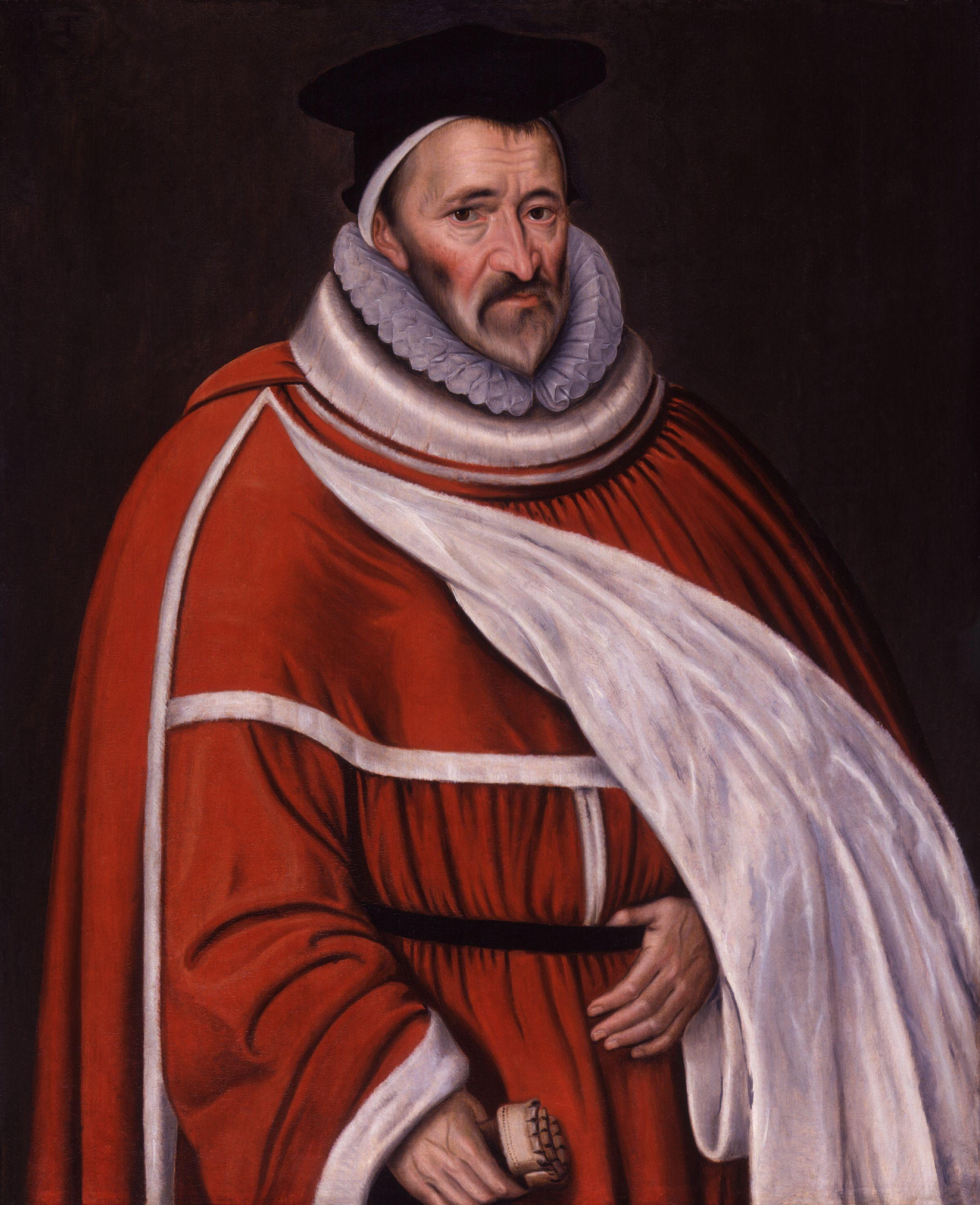
Sir Edmund Anderson, Chief Justice of the Common Pleas

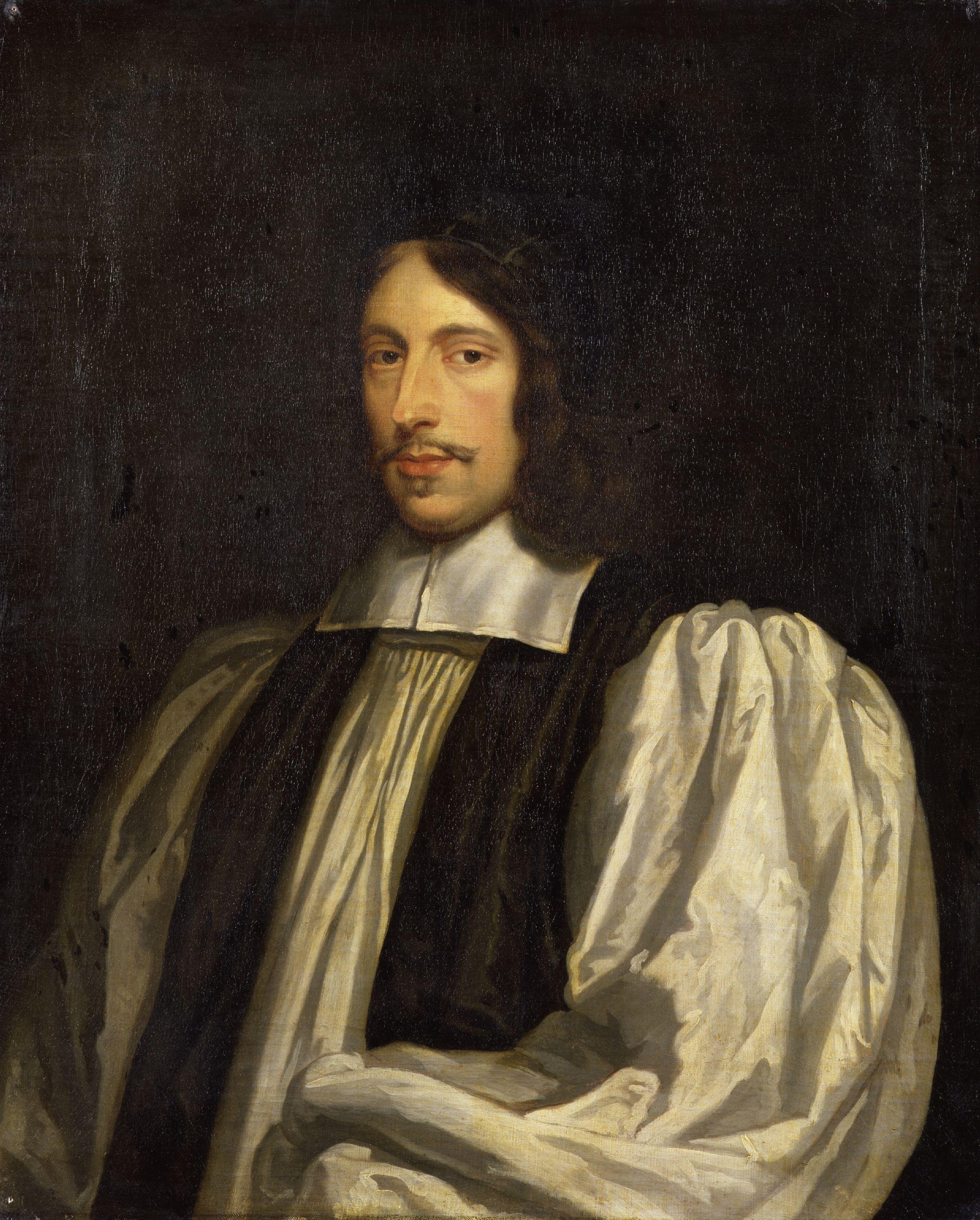
Bishop of Oxford, Bishop of Durham, Rector of Lincoln College

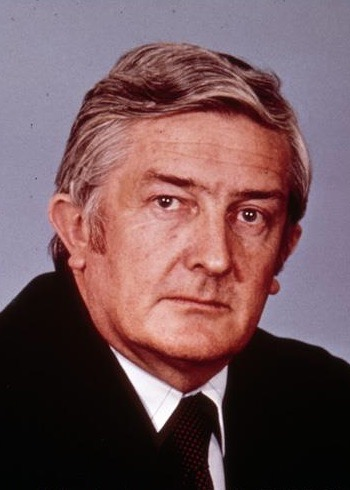
Peter Durack, former Attorney-General of Australia

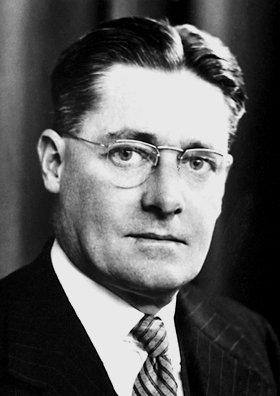
Lord Florey, Nobel Prize-winning pharmacologist and physiologist

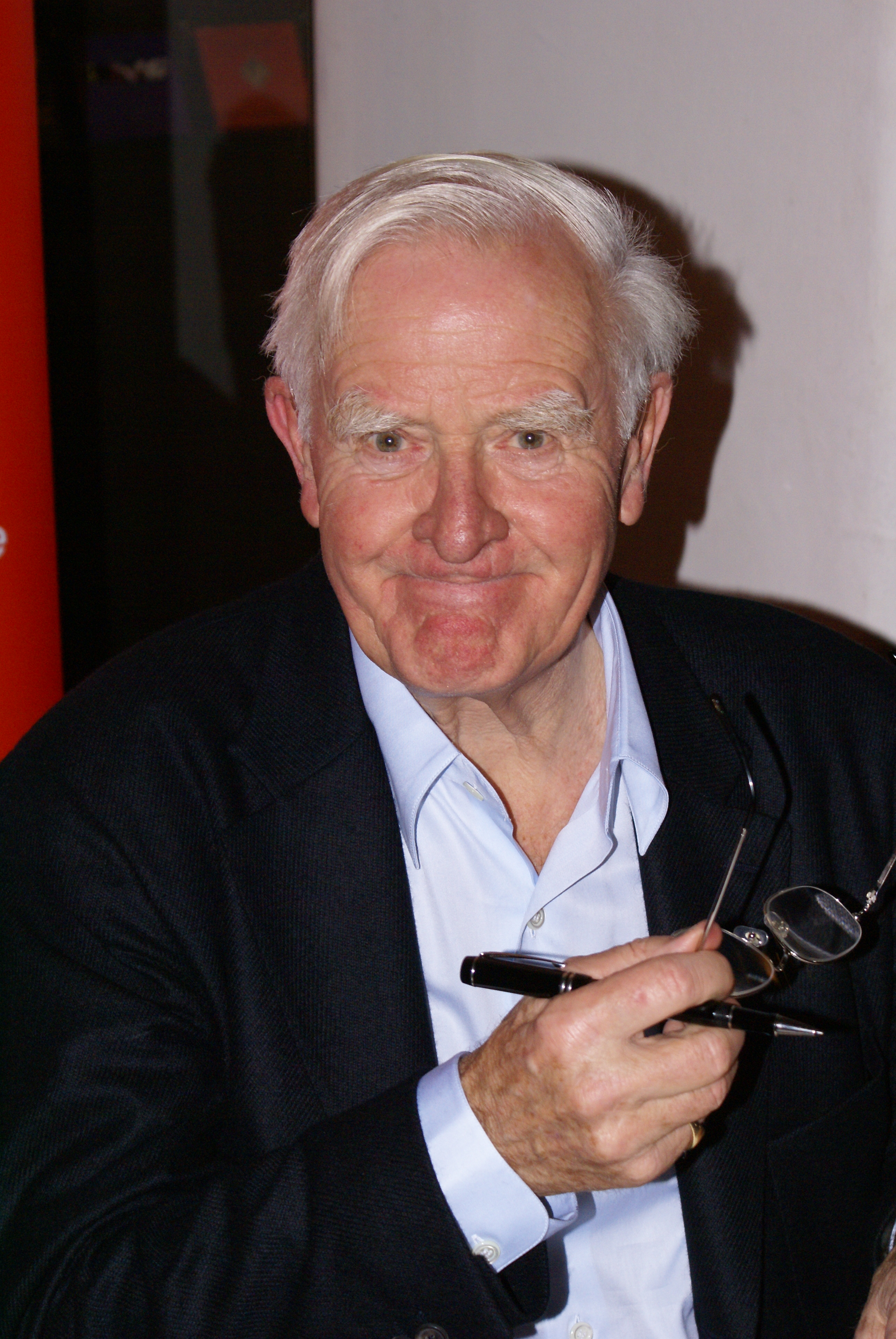
John le Carré, author

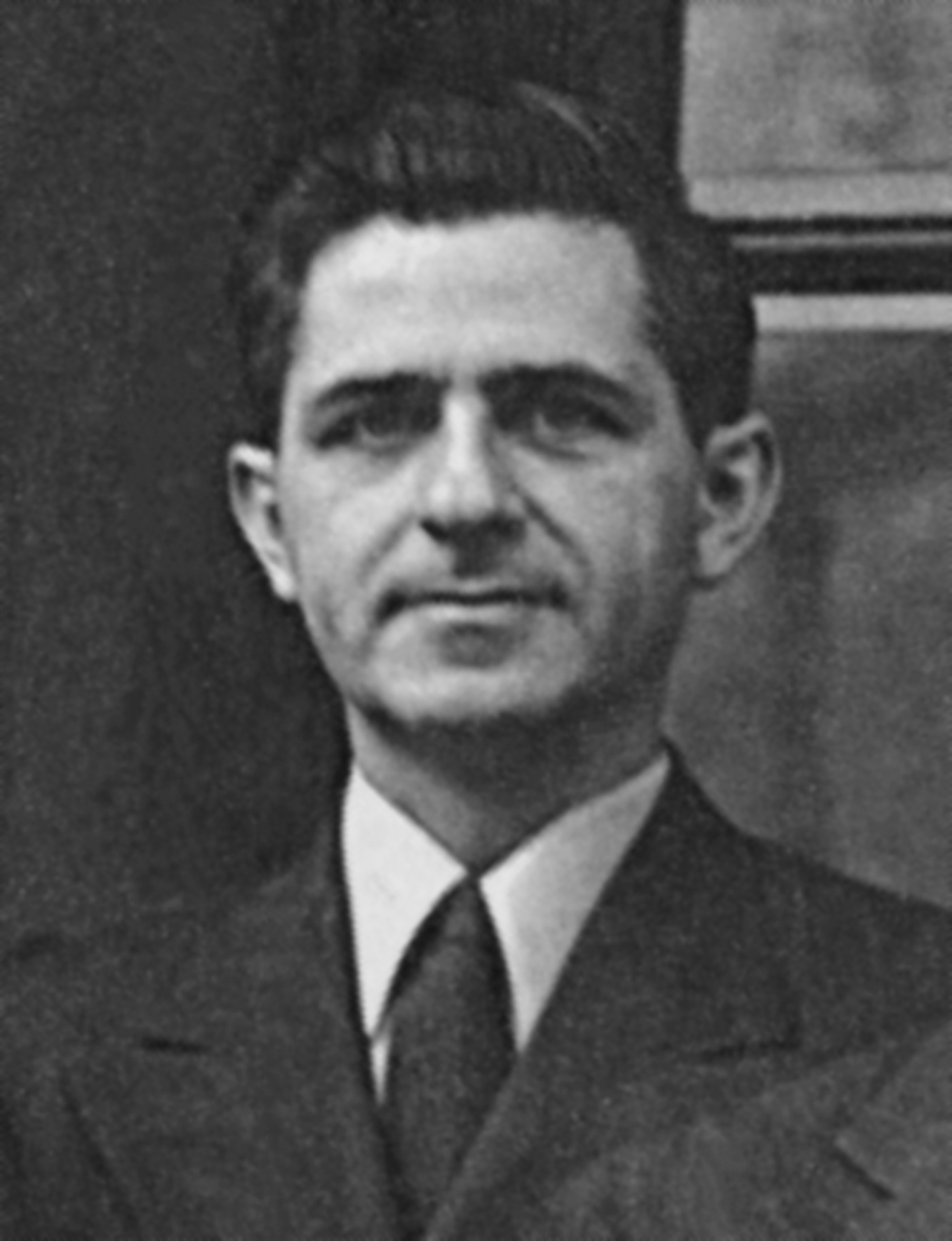
David Lewis, former leader of the New Democratic Party

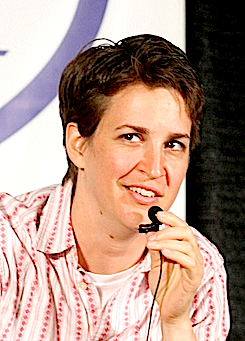
Rachel Maddow, television host

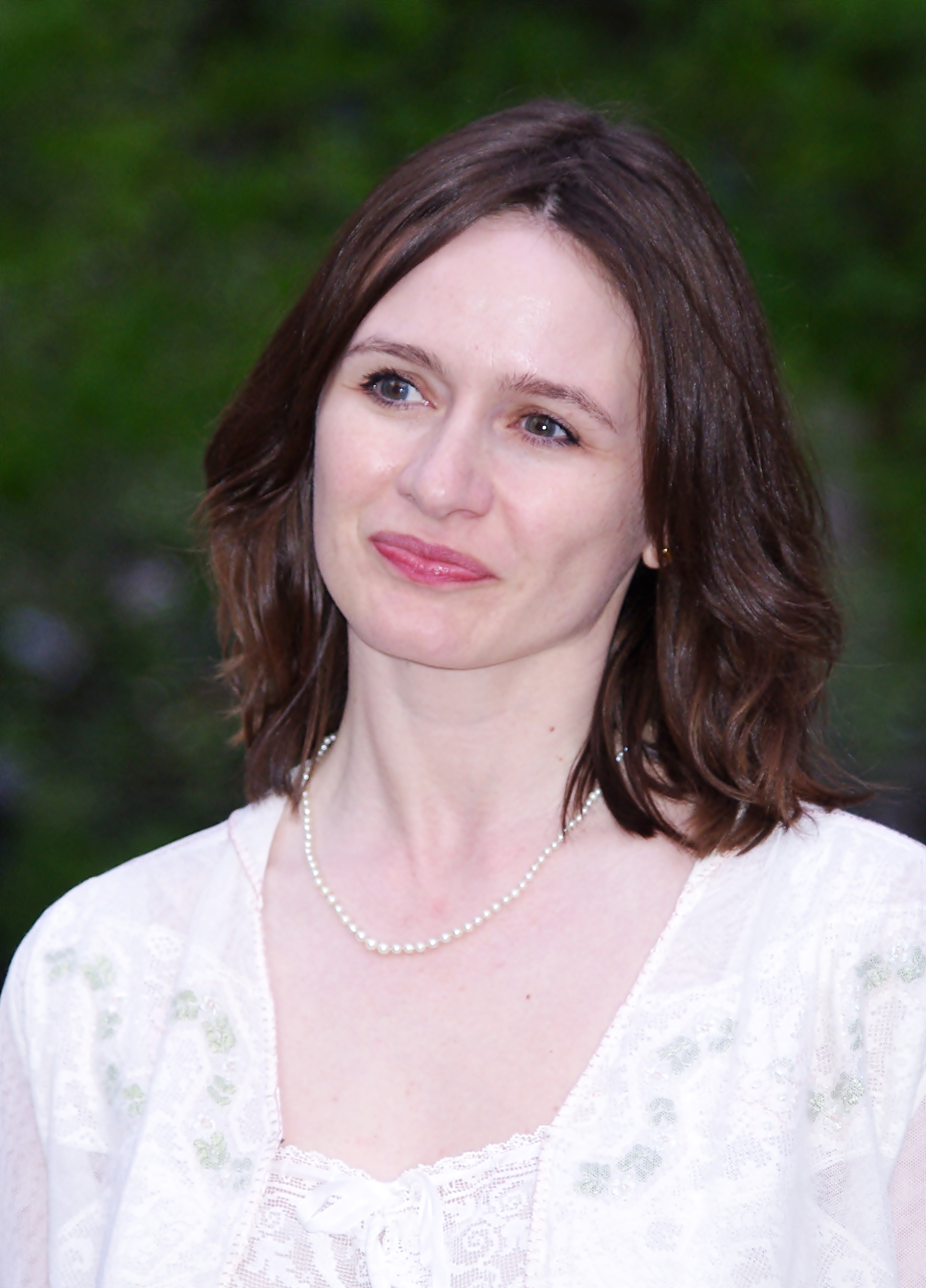
Emily Mortimer, actress and screenwriter

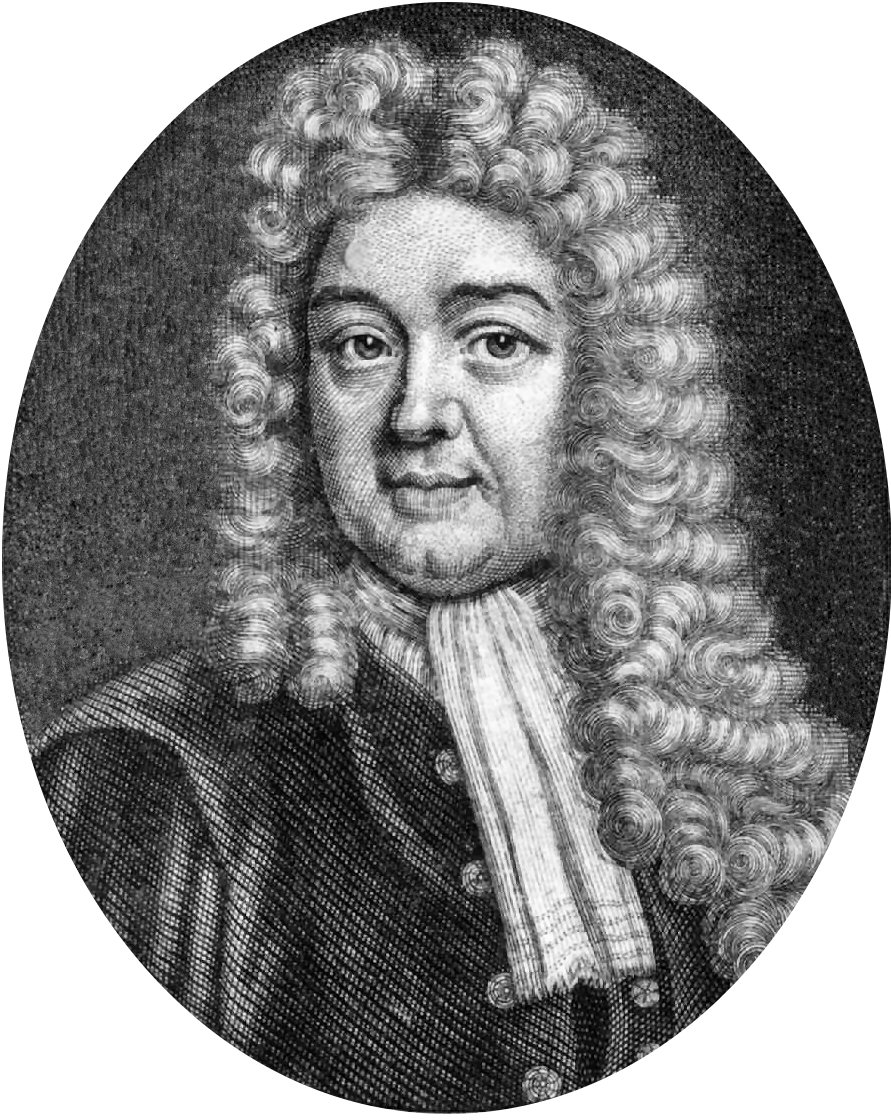
John Radcliffe, physician

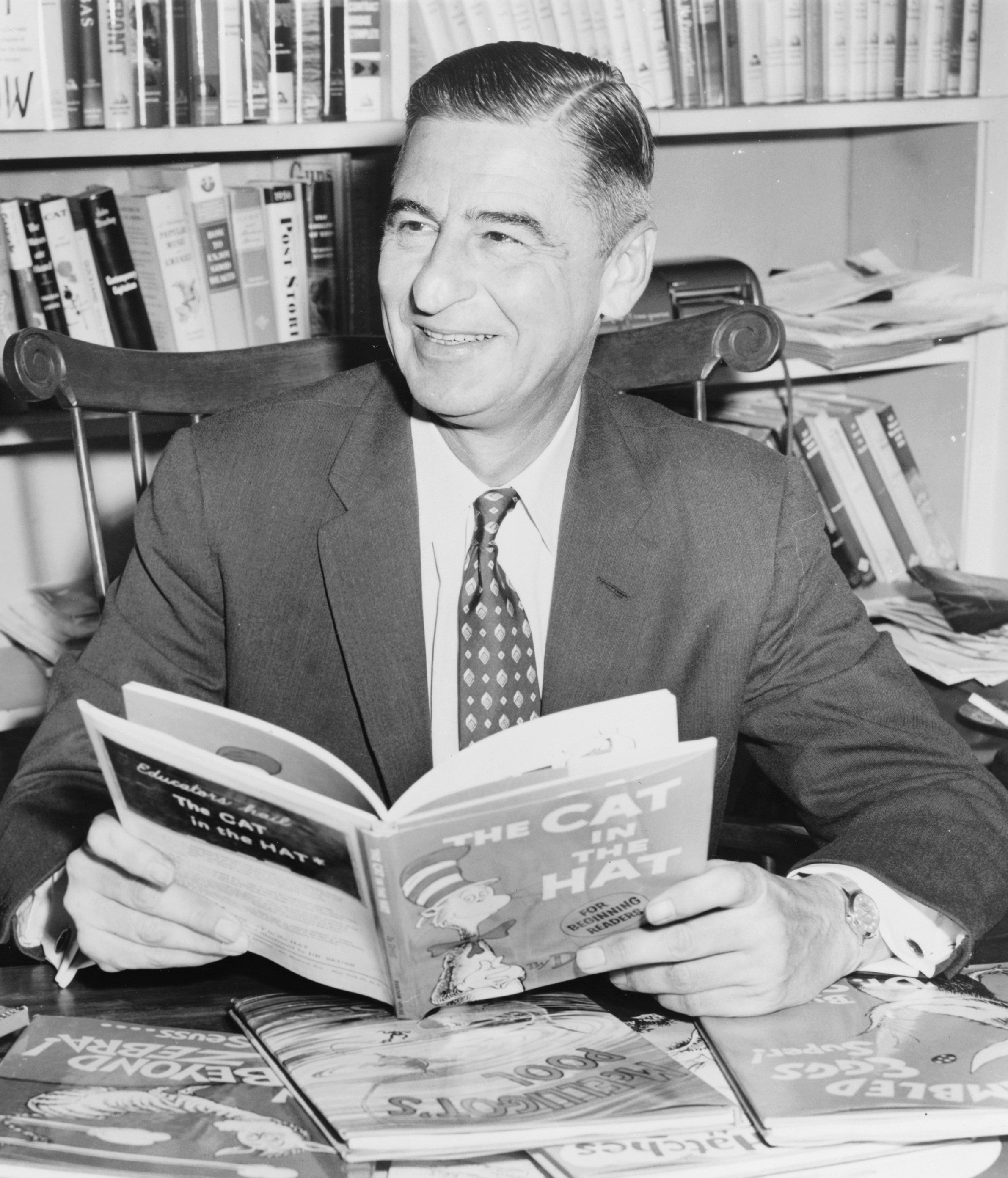
Dr. Seuss, author and illustrator

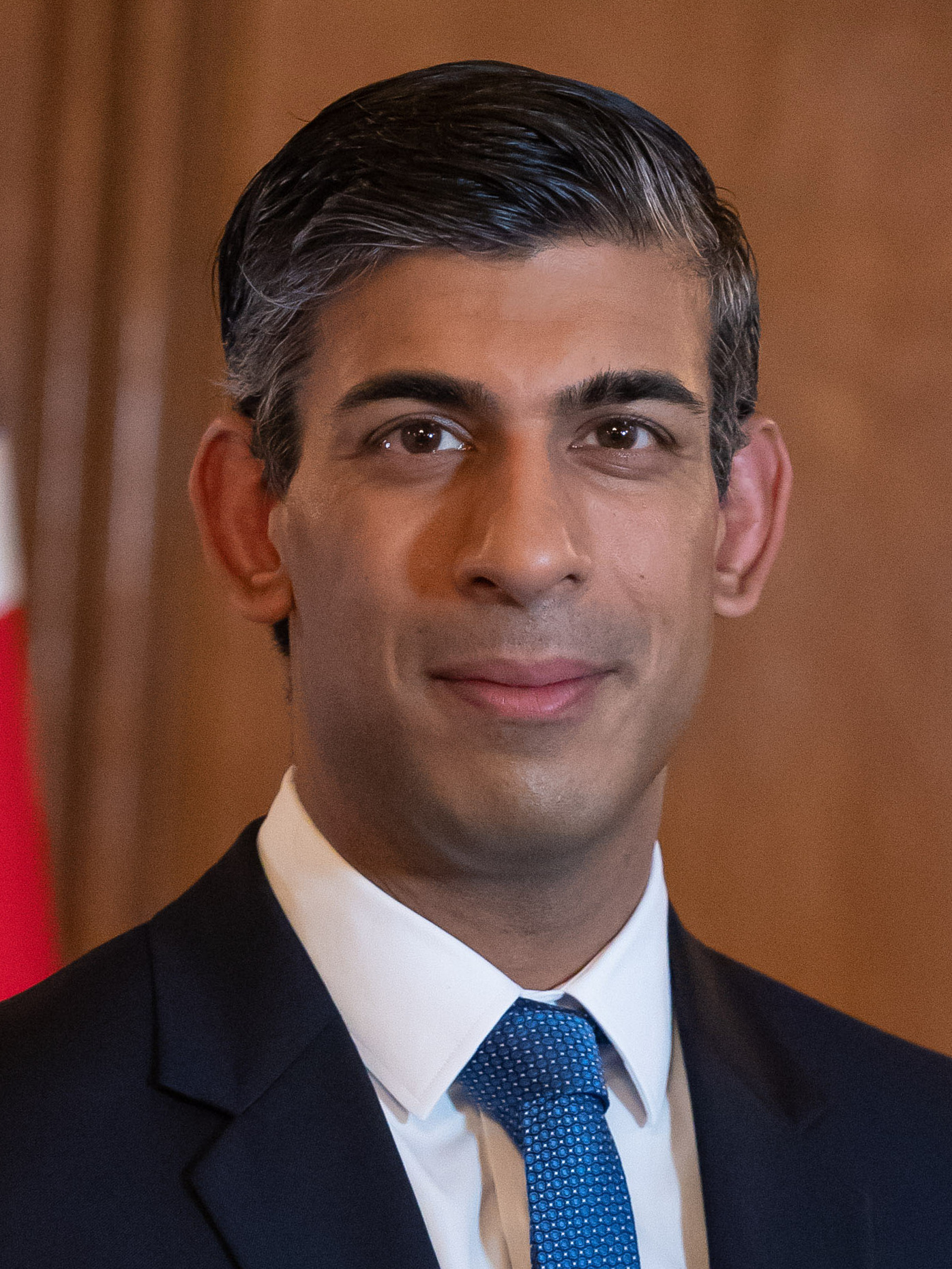
Rishi Sunak, former Prime Minister of the United Kingdom

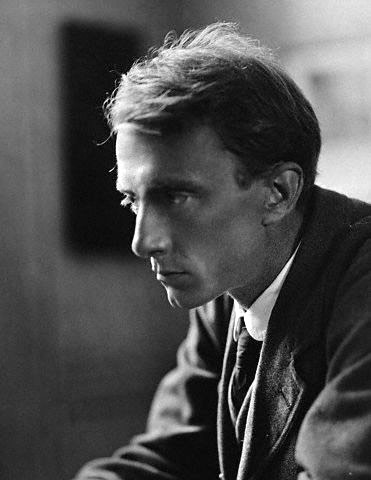
Edward Thomas, poet killed in action during the First World War

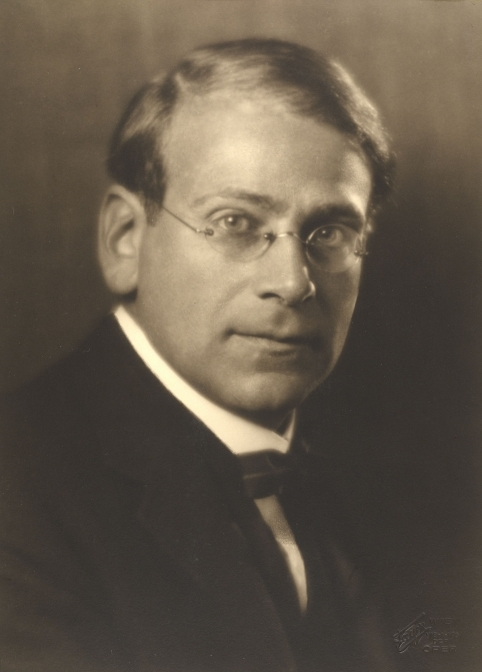
Egon Wellesz, composer, teacher, and musicologist

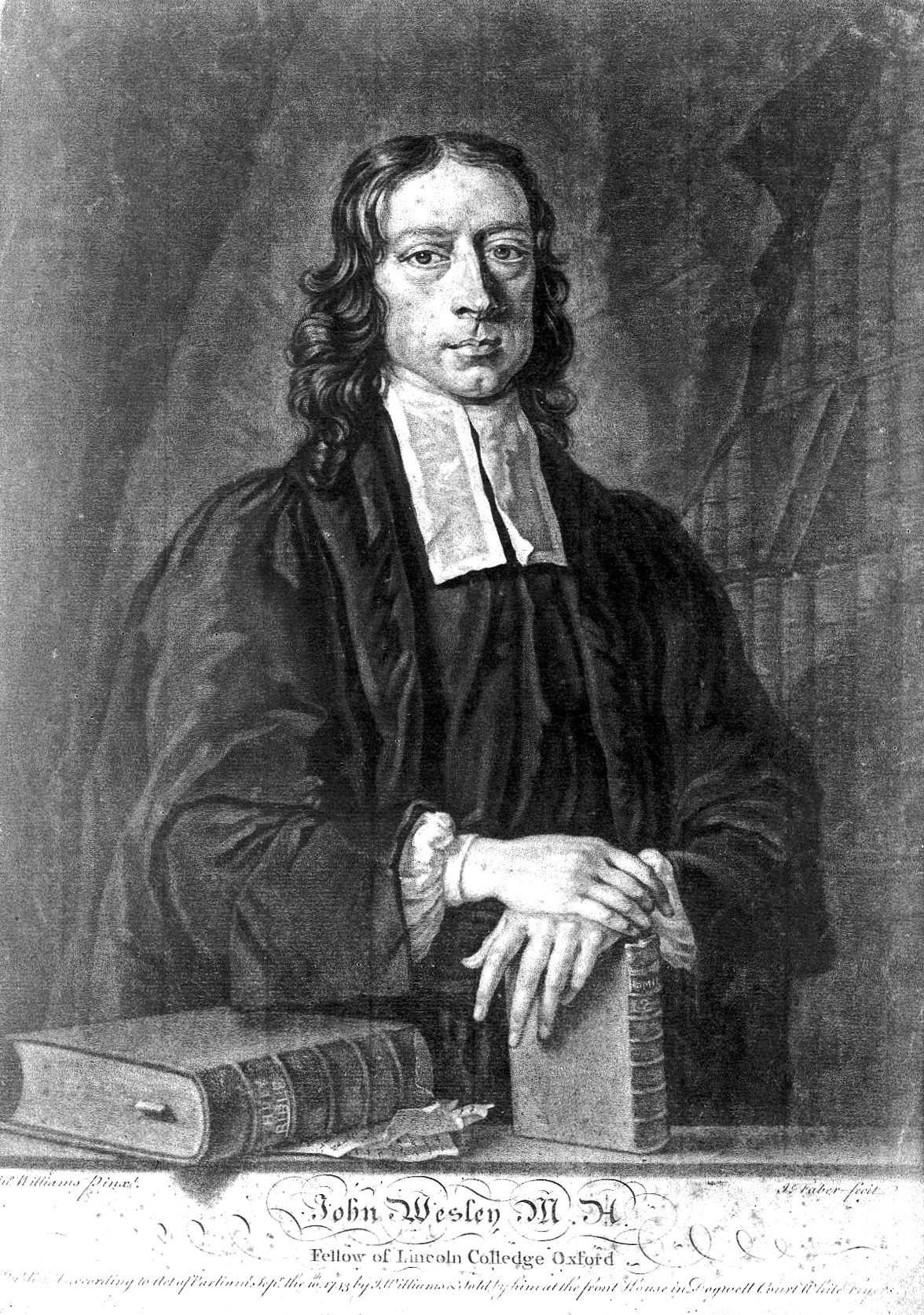
John Wesley, cleric and theologian

Notable former students of the college have progressed to careers in academia, business, politics and sports. Alumni include; Philip May (husband of former Prime Minister Theresa May), Steph Cook (Olympic gold medalist), William Davenant (poet), John Hobson (economist and influential theorist of imperialism), John le Carré (author), Rachel Maddow (political commentator and author), Dr. Seuss (author and illustrator), Rishi Sunak (British Prime Minister), Adebayo Ogunlesi (lawyer and investment banker) and Edward Thomas (poet). Between 1998 and 2002, five future Parliamentarians studied at Lincoln at overlapping times: MPs Rishi Sunak, Lee Rowley, Miatta Fahnbulleh, Shabana Mahmood and life peer Charles Banner. Princess Elisabeth of Belgium, heir apparent to King Philippe, started to read history and politics in 2021.

Past fellows include John Radcliffe (physician after whom the Radcliffe Camera, Radcliffe Infirmary, Radcliffe Observatory and John Radcliffe Hospital are named), Howard Florey (awarded the Nobel Prize in Physiology or Medicine in 1945 for his role in large scale production of penicillin), Edward Abraham and Norman Heatley (biochemists also instrumental in the development of penicillin)Nevil Sidgwick (chemist) and John Wesley (theologian).

Lincoln was the first college in Oxford (or Cambridge) to admit a Jewish Fellow, the Australian-born philosopher Samuel Alexander (appointed 1882).

In 1955, Paul Shuffrey, the civil servant and editor, and a former Lincoln student, endowed a fellowship in memory of his father, the leading architect and architectural designer, Leonard Shuffrey.

=== Rectors ===
Novelist and Lincoln graduate John le Carré, himself a one-time spy, revealed that fictional spymaster George Smiley was partly modelled on former Lincoln rector Vivian H. H. Green. At least one other recent Lincoln Rector, Sir Maurice Shock, enjoyed a prior career in British intelligence, although there is little evidence to substantiate the college's reputation as a recruiting ground for spies.

From 1954 to 1972, the Rector of the college was Walter Fraser Oakeshott, most famous for discovering the Winchester Manuscript of Sir Thomas Malory's Le Morte d'Arthur in 1934 while an Assistant Master at Winchester College. Lincoln College's largest performance space is named after him.

The academic Mark Pattison was elected as Rector of the college in 1861 and is thought to have been the inspiration for the character of Dr. Casaubon in George Eliot's novel Middlemarch.

The current Rector is Nigel Clifford who assumed the position in 2024.

== Gallery ==
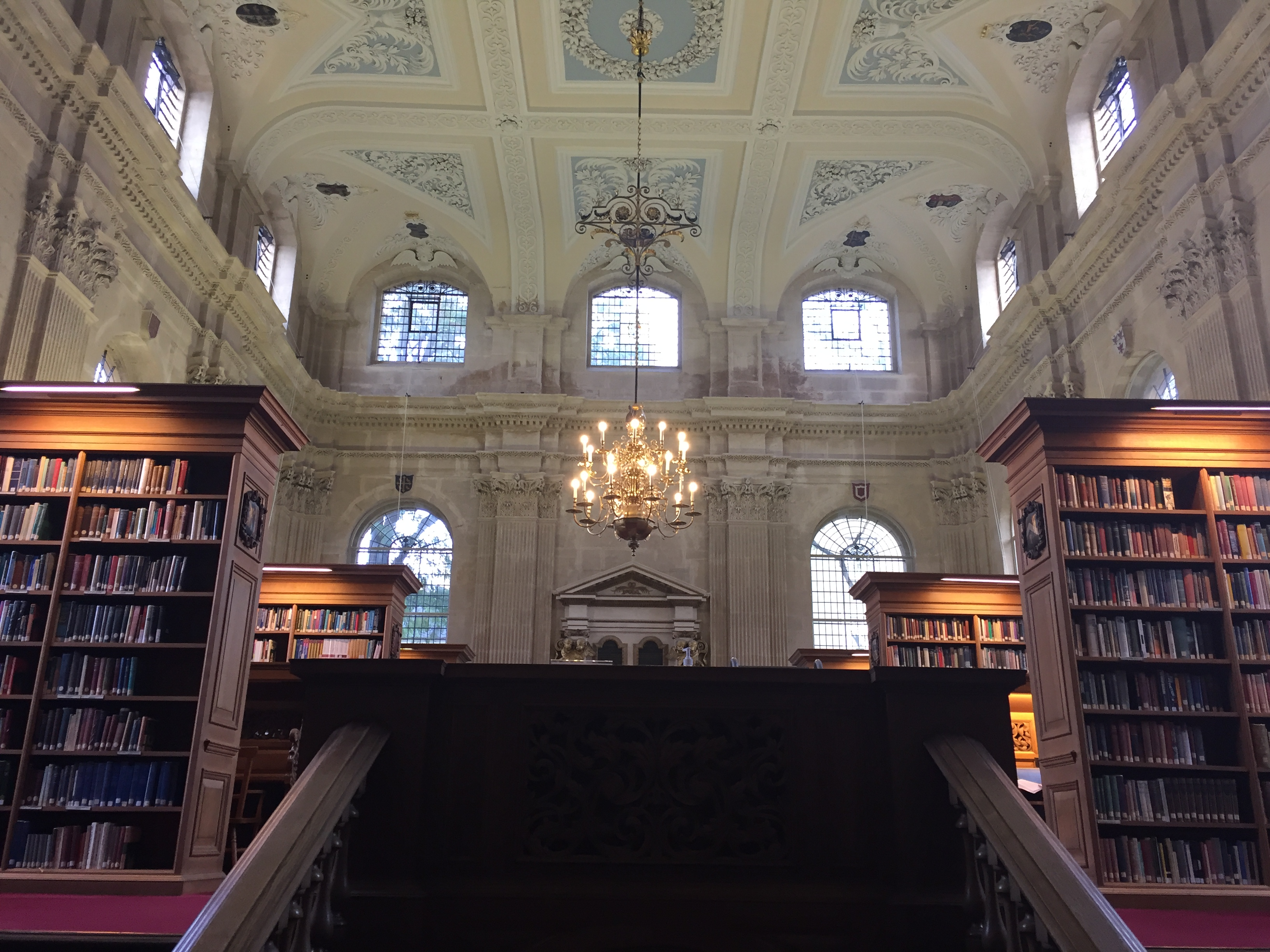
Inside the college library

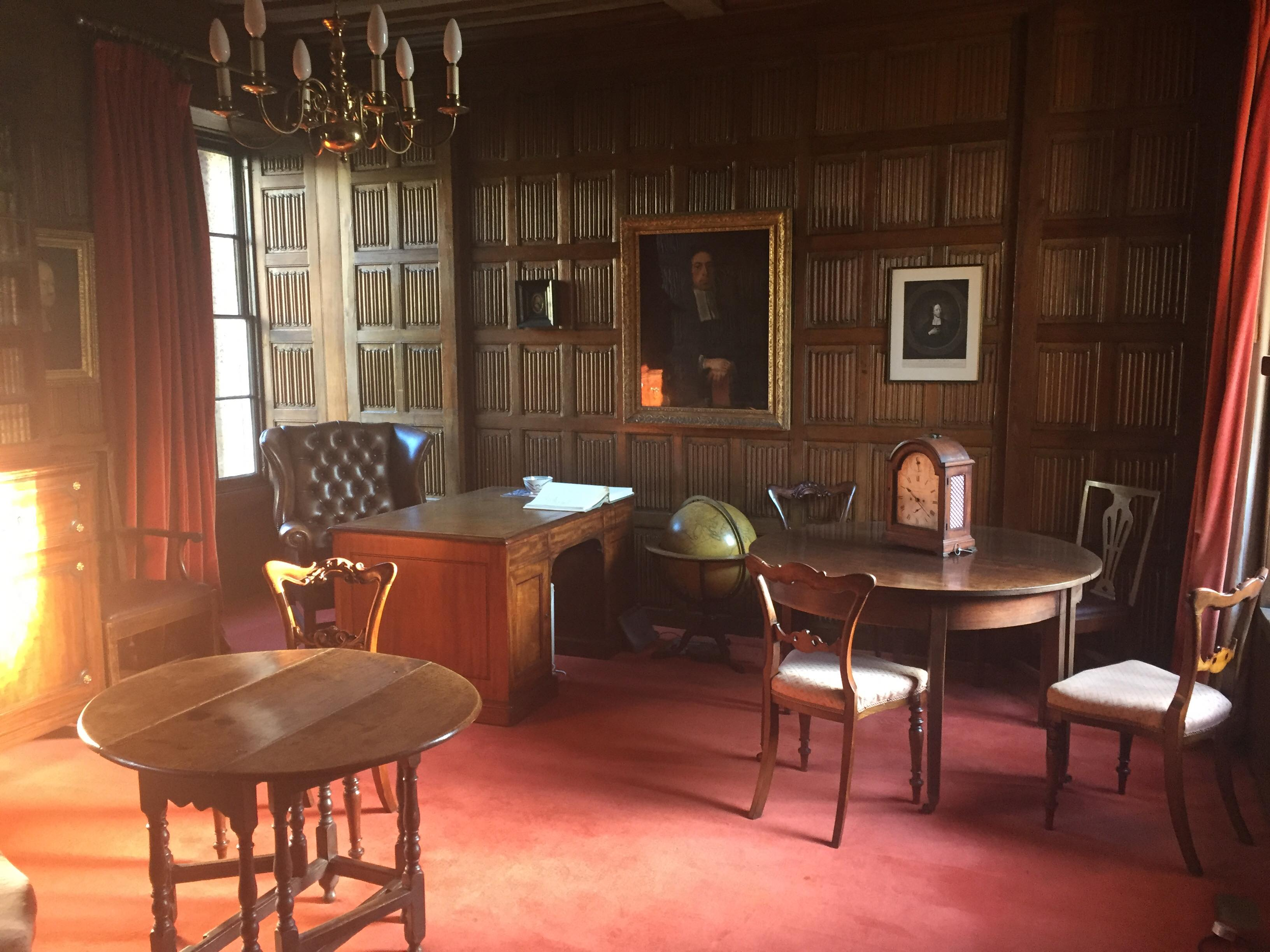
Wesley Room

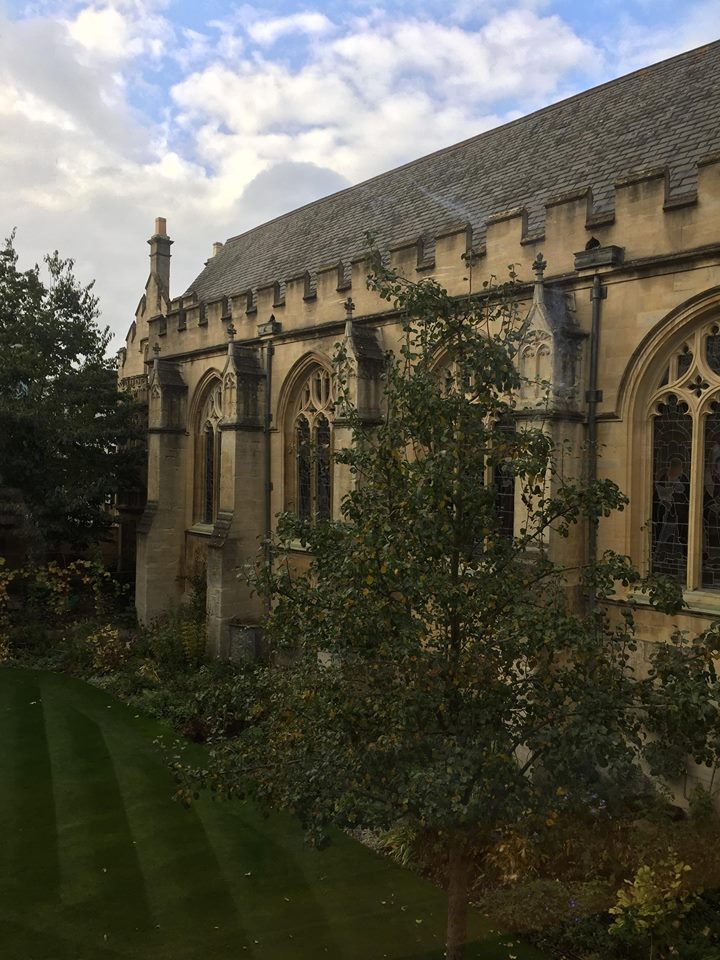
View of chapel and Rector's Garden

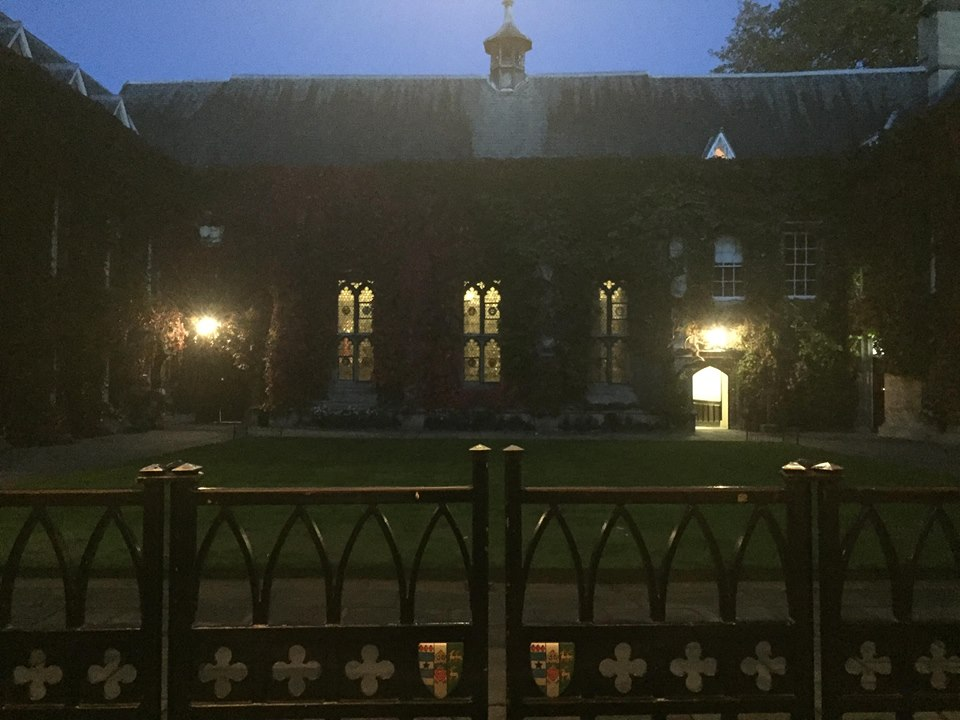
Front gate in evening

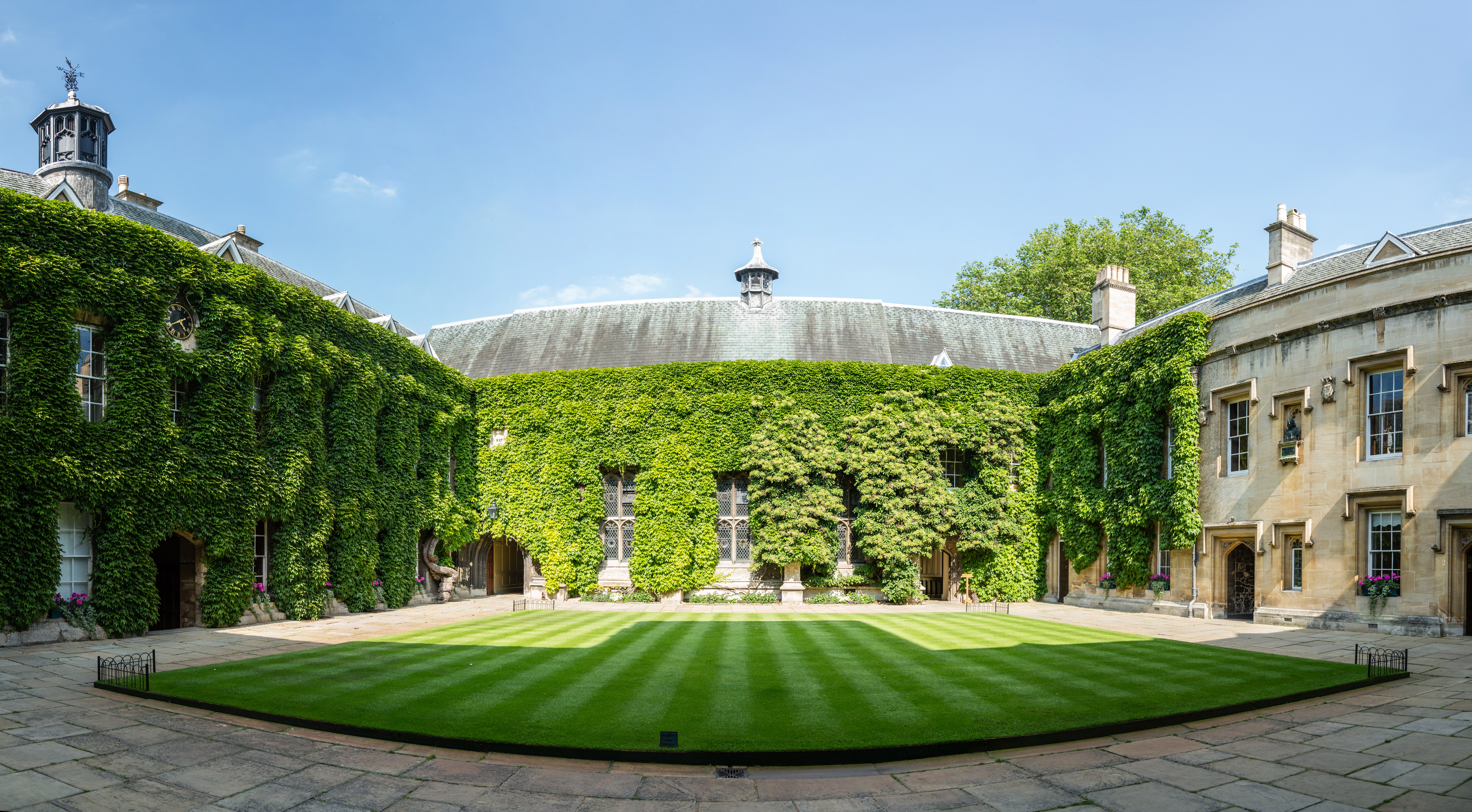
Panoramic image of the Front quad

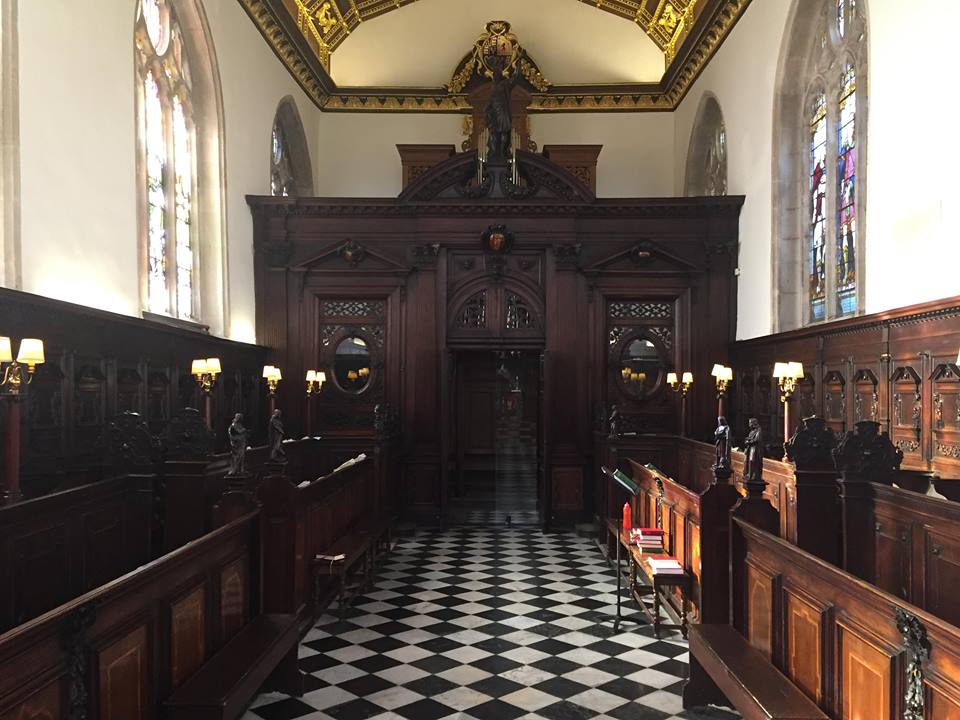
College chapel

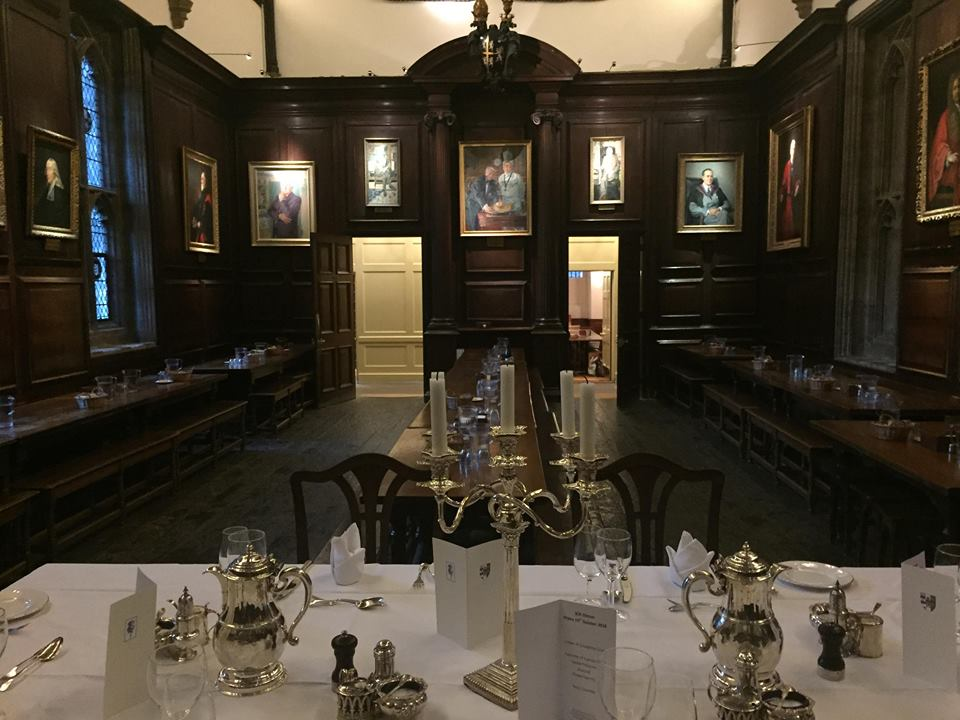
View of dining hall from High Table

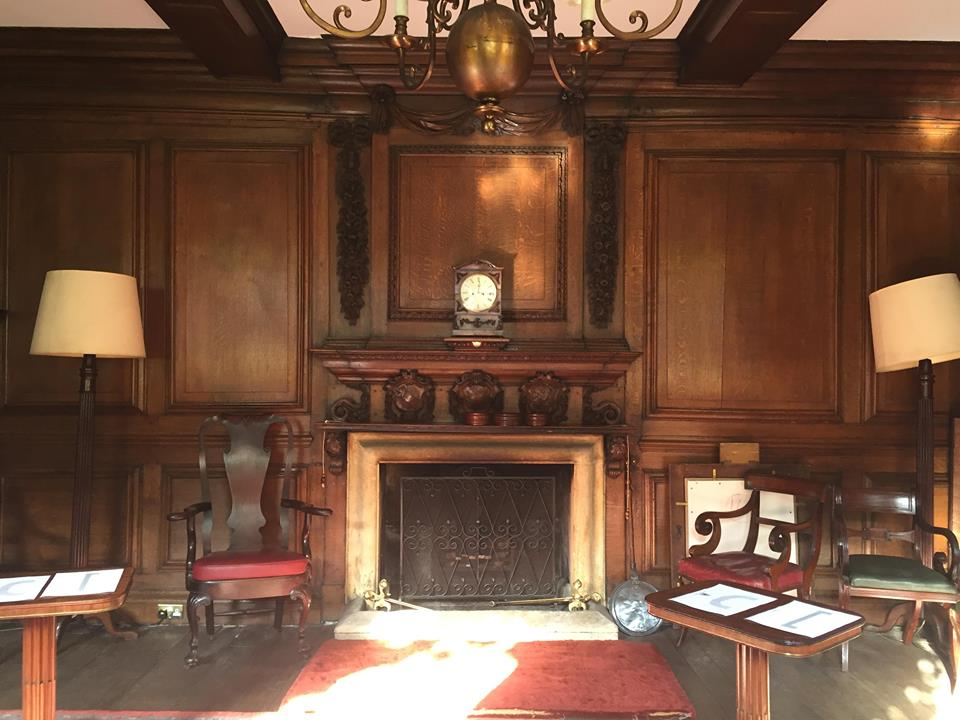
Lower Senior Common Room

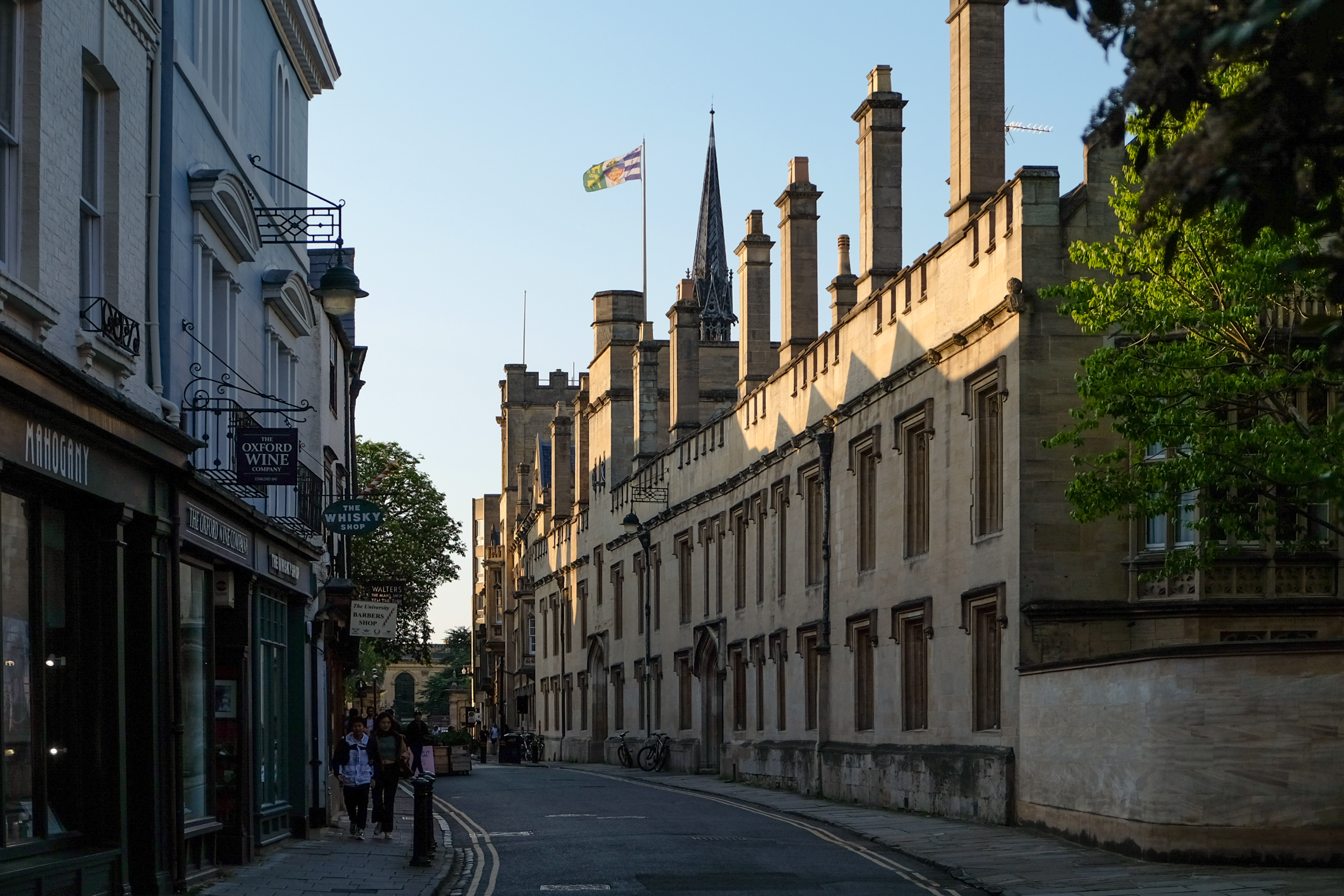
Exterior from Turl Street

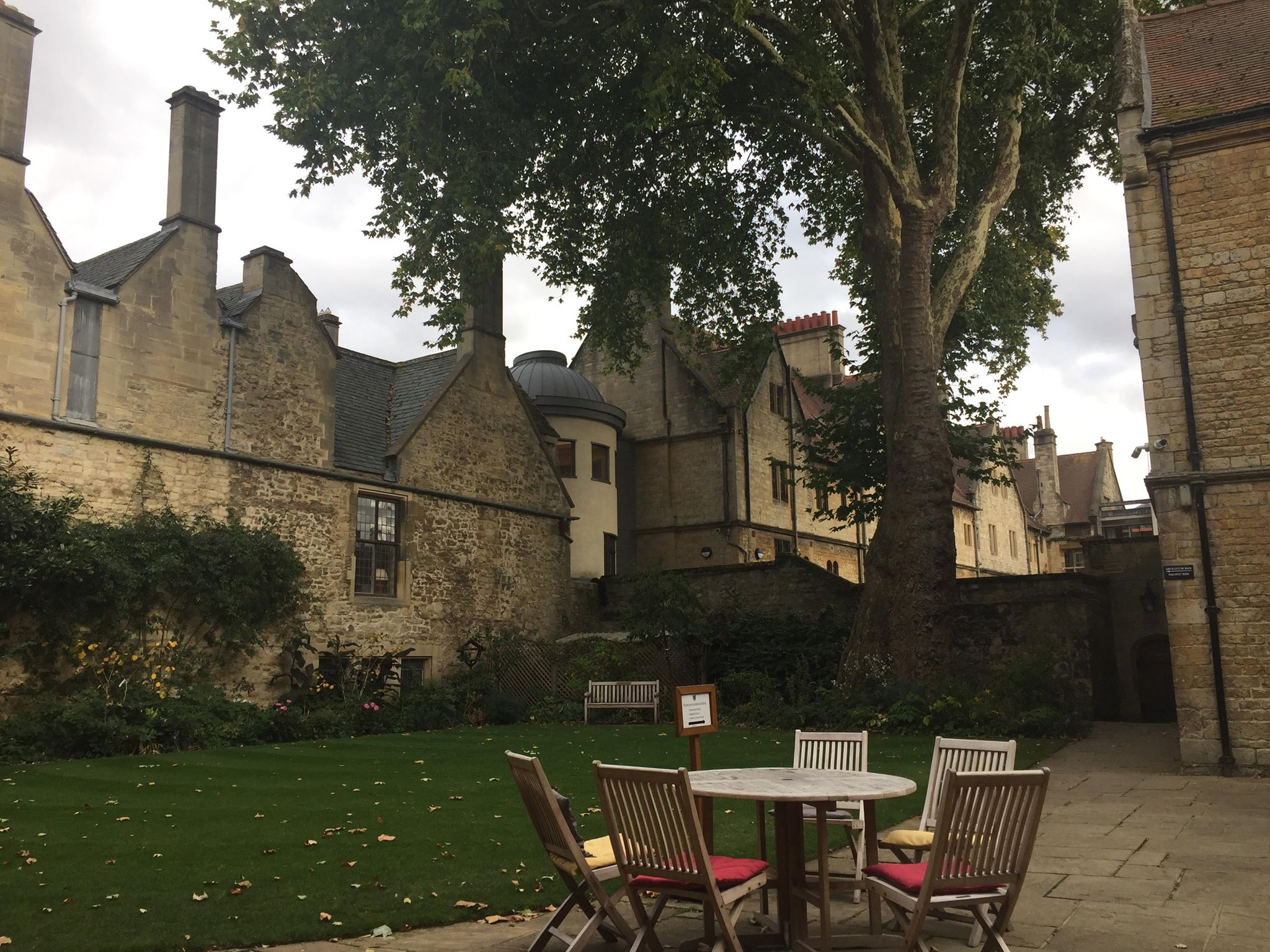
The Grove

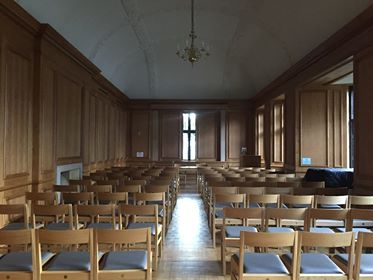
Oakeshott Room

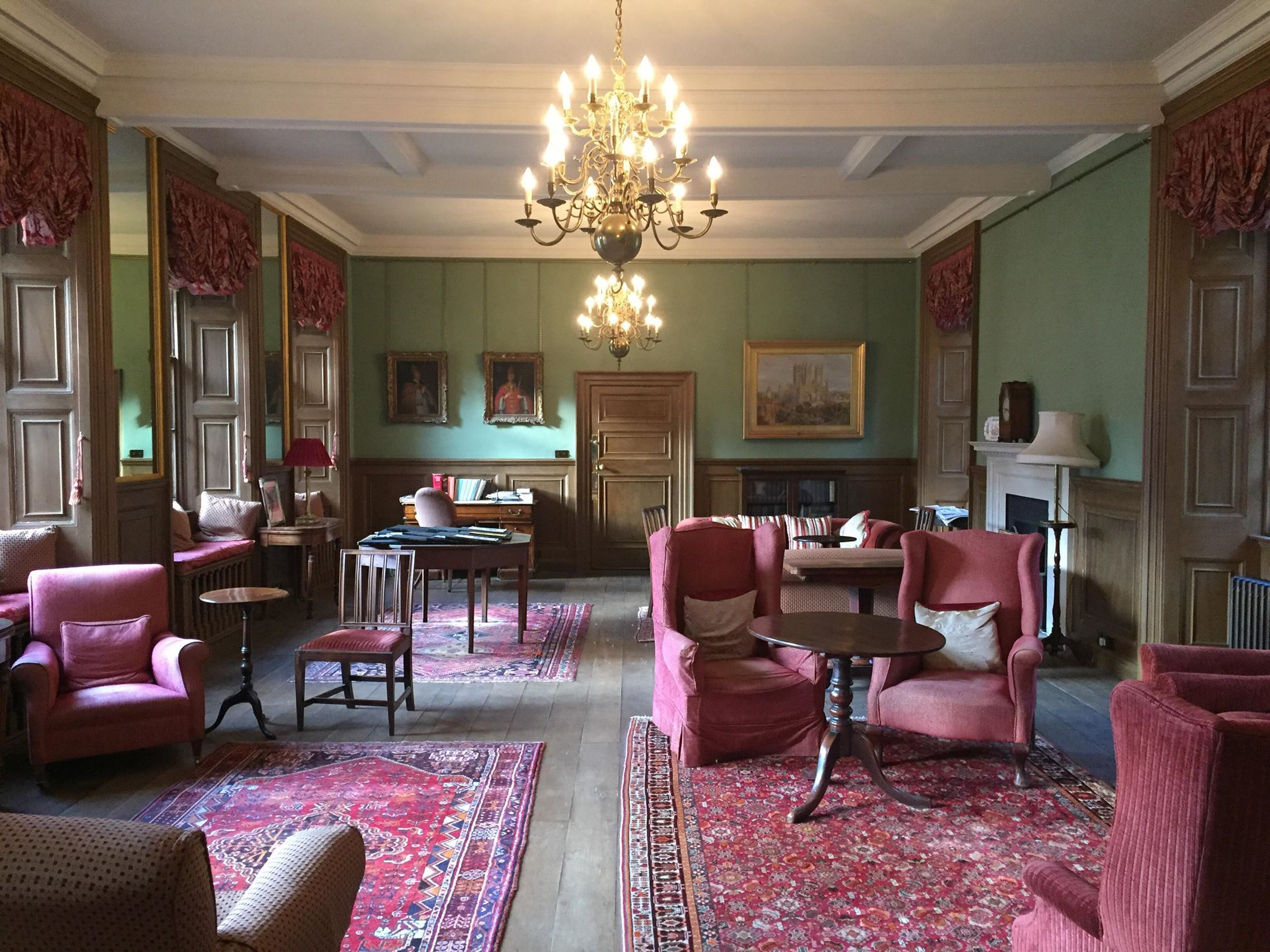
Senior Common Room

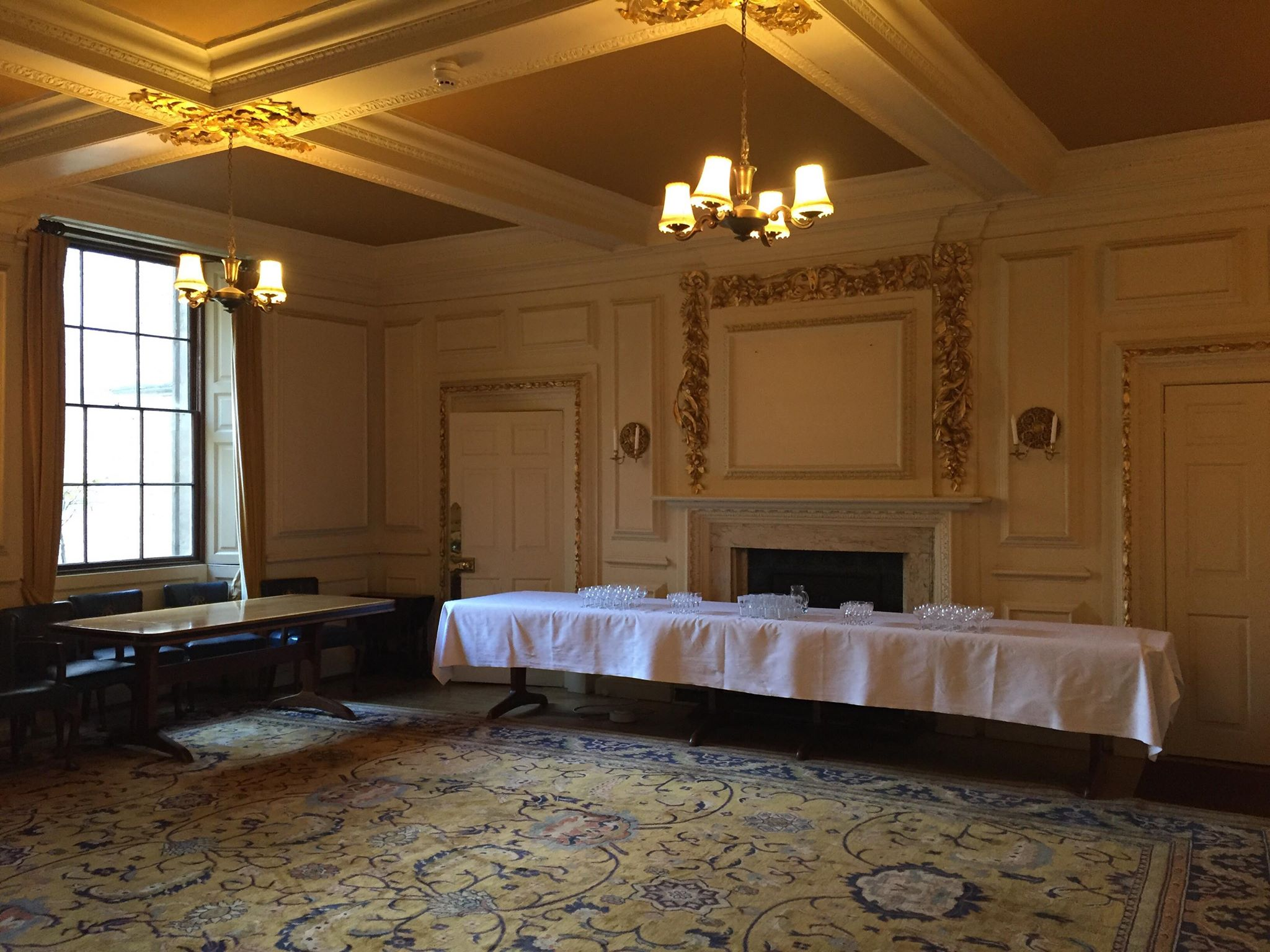
Beckington Room
