= Jan Hatzius =

German-American economist

- Born: December 17, 1968 (age 57); Heidelberg, Germany

Academic background
- Education: University of Hamburg (Diplom); University of Freiburg; University of Wisconsin-Madison (MA); Kiel Institute for the World Economy; University of Oxford (DPhil)
- Doctoral advisor: Stephen Nickell
- Influences: William Dudley

Academic work
- Discipline: Macroeconomics, economic forecasting
- Institutions: Goldman Sachs

Jan Hatzius (born December 17, 1968) is a German economist serving as the chief economist of investment bank Goldman Sachs. Notable for his bearish forecasts prior to the 2008 financial crisis, he is a three-time winner of the Lawrence R. Klein Award for the most accurate US economic forecast over the prior four years. He has also won a number of other forecasting awards, including the Wall Street Journal, Bloomberg, and Institutional Investor annual forecaster rankings.

Born in Heidelberg, Hatzius attended the University of Wisconsin–Madison and the Kiel Institute for the World Economy. He earned a Doctor of Philosophy in economics from the University of Oxford in 1995 (advisor: Stephen Nickell). He has also worked as a research fellow at the London School of Economics.

Hatzius joined Goldman Sachs in 1997 as an associate economist in the Frankfurt office and moved to New York in 1999. He became a managing director in 2004, and succeeded former chief US economist William Dudley in 2005. In 2008, Hatzius was named to Goldman Sachs′ list of partners. In 2011, Hatzius became the firm's chief economist. He is also the head of both the Global Economics group and Americas Macro Research.

Hatzius is married with three children, and resides in New York City's Upper West Side.

== Selected publications ==
- Hatzius, Jan; Hooper, Peter; Mishkin, Frederic S.; Schoenholtz, Kermit L.; Watson, Mark W. (July 2010). "Financial Conditions Indexes: A Fresh Look after the Financial Crisis". NBER Working Paper No. W16150. SSRN 1635673.
- Hatzius, J. (2000). "Foreign direct investment and factor demand elasticities". European Economic Review. 44 (1): 117–143. doi:10.1016/S0014-2921(98)00050-6.
- Hatzius, J. (1998). "Domestic Jobs and Foreign Wages". Scandinavian Journal of Economics. 100 (4): 733–746. doi:10.1111/1467-9442.00133.
- Gauthier, A. H. L. N.; Hatzius, J. (1997). "Family Benefits and Fertility: An Econometric Analysis". Population Studies. 51 (3): 295–306. doi:10.1080/0032472031000150066.
