= Kate Barker =

British economist

Dame Kate Barker DBE FAcSS
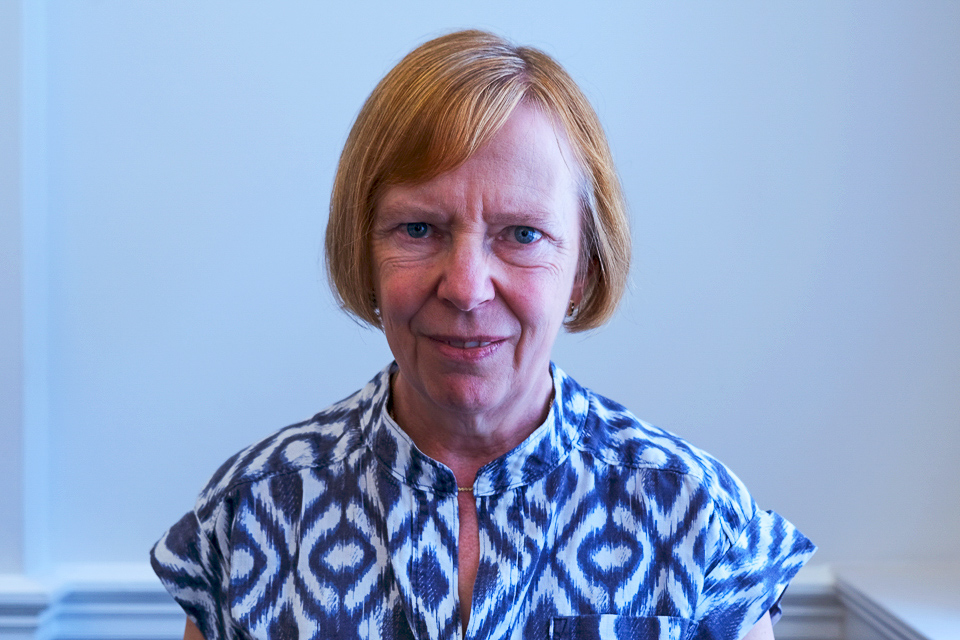
- Barker in 2019

Member of the Monetary Policy Committee
- In office June 2001 – May 2010
- Governor: Sir Edward George (2001–2003); Mervyn King (2003–2013)

Personal details
- Born: Katharine Mary Barker; 1957 (age 68–69)
- Education: St Hilda's College, Oxford
- Profession: Economist

Dame Katharine Mary Barker DBE FAcSS (born 1957) is a British economist. She is principally noted for her role at the Bank of England and for advising the British government on social issues such as housing and health care.

== Early career ==
Barker grew up in Stoke-on-Trent. She received a degree in Philosophy, Politics and Economics at St Hilda's College, Oxford in 1979 and then worked for a large pension fund in London. She was a research officer at the National Institute of Economic and Social Research (1981–85) and was the chief European economist at the Ford Motor Company in Brentwood (1985–94). From 1994 to 2001, she was chief economic adviser at the Confederation of British Industry (CBI). She was also a member of the HM Treasury's Panel of Independent Economic Advisers 1996–97; and a non-executive director of the Yorkshire Building Society (1999 – April 2001).

Barker served as an external member of the Monetary Policy Committee of the Bank of England from 2001 until the end of May 2010. She was the first external MPC member appointed for three terms and did not seek a fourth term.

== Housing, social care and other policy work ==
Barker was appointed by the Government in April 2003 to conduct an independent Review of UK Housing Supply, leading to a final report in March 2004. The Government's full response to this review was published in December 2005. In October 2005, she was appointed a board member of the Housing Corporation, and from 2008 to 2011 of one of its successor bodies, the Homes and Communities Agency.

In December 2005, she was asked to conduct an independent review of Land Use Planning, and she reported on 5 December 2006. From 2010 to May 2015, she was chair of the Northern Ireland Economic Advisory Group. She was appointed as one of two non-executive members of the UK government's Office for Budget Responsibility from June 2011 to June 2017.

Barker was appointed Commander of the Order of the British Empire (CBE) for services to social housing in the 2006 Birthday Honours and made Dame Commander of the Order of the British Empire (DBE) in the 2014 Birthday Honours for services to the economy. She is a Fellow of the Academy of Social Sciences.

Her book Housing: Where's the Plan was published in September 2014 by London Publishing Partnership, in their Perspectives series.

In 2014, she chaired a commission on the Future of Health and Social Care in England for the King's Fund, which delivered its final report in September. She also led a quality review of the National Accounts for the Office for National Statistics during 2014.

== Board memberships and other posts ==
Barker was a non-executive director on the board of the Yorkshire Building Society from 2010 to 2017. She was a senior adviser to Credit Suisse, 2010–2016.

From 2010 to June 2016, she was a non-executive director of Electra Private Equity plc, and interim chairman from November 2015.

In March 2014, she was appointed a member of the Fiscal Policy Panel of the States of Jersey, and was chairman of the Panel from April 2016 to May 2024.

Barker became chair of the advisory board for the Centre for Business Research at the Judge Business School, University of Cambridge, in October 2012 and is now a Senior Research Associate. She was a governor at Anglia Ruskin University from 2000 to 2010, and chair of governors 2007–2010; in October 2011, the university awarded her an honorary doctorate.

She was chair of the Society of Business Economists from 2013 to 2016. She has been a trustee of the Essex Community Foundation.

From September 2014 to September 2023, Barker was chairman of the trustees of the British Coal Staff Superannuation Scheme.

She was a non-executive director (NED) of Taylor Wimpey plc from April 2011 to July 2020, and joined the board of Man Group plc in April 2017, serving until March 2023.

From April 2017 to March 2020, she was a member of the National Infrastructure Commission. From July 2017 to April 2020, she was a member of the council of the University of Oxford.

In July 2019, she joined the UK Cabinet Office's Geospatial Commission as one of four new commissioners, serving until May 2021.

In April 2020, Barker became a trustee of the Universities Superannuation Scheme (USS), and took over as chairman from Professor Sir David Eastwood in September 2020. She holds the post until July 2027.

Previously an independent member of the Football Regulatory Authority of the Football Association, she is a Stoke City F.C. fan.

Barker was appointed a Church Commissioner in the Church of England in April 2023, and is a member of the Assets Committee and Property Group. She is a member of the investment committee of the United Reformed Church.

She is currently Chair of the National Statistician's Expert User Advisory Group.

She chairs the Governing Council of The Productivity Institute.

She is a member of the South Yorkshire Mayoral Economic Advisory Council, and in July 2026 was awarded an honorary doctorate from the University of Sheffield.

She was Deputy Chair of the New Towns Taskforce July 2024 to September 2025, for the Ministry of Housing, Communities and Local Government.
