= Stephen Redding =

British-American economist

- Born: 1972 (age 53–54)
- Occupation: economist
- Known for: research in international trade and economic geography

Academic background
- Education: University of Oxford
- Thesis: Endogenous Innovation and Economic Growth (1996)
- Doctoral advisor: Philippe Aghion; Stephen Nickell

Academic work
- Institutions: Stanford University; National Bureau of Economic Research; London School of Economics; Yale School of Management; Princeton University

Stephen Redding is a British-American economist. His research interests include international trade, economic geography, urban economics, transportation economics and productivity growth. Recent work has been concerned with firm heterogeneity and international trade, multi-product firms, the distributional consequences of globalization, agglomeration forces, and transport infrastructure improvements.

== Biography ==
He completed his DPhil in economics at the University of Oxford (as a member of Nuffield College) in 1996 with a thesis on Endogenous Innovation and Economic Growth, prepared under the supervision of Philippe Aghion and Stephen Nickell.

He has taught at the London School of Economics, the Yale School of Management and Princeton University, and was a Visiting Associate Professor at Harvard University; he has also worked at the Bank of England.

As of 2025, he was the Kleinheinz Family Professor of International Studies and Professor of Economics at Stanford University and director of the International Trade and Investment Program of the National Bureau of Economic Research. He is a fellow of the Econometric Society, and an associate editor of Econometrica and the Quarterly Journal of Economics. In 2025, he is also an international research fellow of the Centre for Economic Performance at the London School of Economics, and a research fellow of the Centre for Economic Policy Research.
