= Stephen Nickell =

British economist

Sir Stephen Nickell CBE FBA
- Stephen Nickell in 1983
- Born: Stephen John Nickell; 25 April 1944 (age 82)

Academic background
- Education: Pembroke College, Cambridge (BA); London School of Economics (MSc)
- Doctoral advisor: Frank Hahn; W. M. Gorman

Academic work
- Doctoral students: Steve Bond; Jan Hatzius; Stephen Redding; Gina Raimondo
- Website: www.nuffield.ox.ac.uk/people/profiles/stephen-nickell/; Information at IDEAS / RePEc

Sir Stephen John Nickell, CBE FBA (born 25 April 1944) is a British economist and former warden of Nuffield College, Oxford, noted for his work in labour economics with Richard Layard and Richard Jackman. Nickell and Layard hypothesised that the tendency for reduced unemployment to lead to inflation resulted from its effect on competitive bargaining in the labour market. He was a member of the Office for Budget Responsibility's Budget Responsibility Committee from April 2011 until December 2016.

== Education ==
Nickell was educated at Merchant Taylors' School, Northwood and the University of Cambridge where he was a student of Pembroke College, Cambridge and studied the Mathematical Tripos. From 1965 until 1968 he was a mathematics teacher at Hendon County School. He was a postgraduate student at the London School of Economics, where he completed a Master of Science degree in 1970 and was awarded the Ely Devons Prize.

== Career and research ==
Nickell worked at the London School of Economics from 1970 until 1984, and again from 1998 until 2006, initially as Lecturer (1970–77), Reader (1977–79), and Professor of Economics (1979–84). From 1984 until 1998 he was Professorial Fellow of Nuffield College, Oxford, Professor of Economics in the University of Oxford, and Director of the University of Oxford Institute of Economics and Statistics.

From 1998 until 2006 he returned to the London School of Economics as School Professor of Economics. He was a member of the Bank of England's Monetary Policy Committee (MPC) from June 2000 to May 2006, when he was replaced by David Blanchflower effective in the June 2006 meeting. In his final six meetings on the MPC, Nickell was the only member in favour of a decrease in the repo rate by 25 basis points; all the other members voted to maintain the repo rate at 4.5% with the exception of David Walton who supported an increase by 25 basis points in Nickell's final meeting. In 2004 he became a Research Fellow of the Institute for the Study of Labor. According to the British Academy Keynes Lecture, delivered in September 2005, he argued "In what follows we shall, among other things, argue that there has not been a spending boom, the non-spending boom was not credit-fuelled and there has probably not been a house price bubble."

He was warden of Nuffield College, Oxford, from 2006 to 2012, and was the first chair of the National Housing and Planning Advice Unit from June 2007 until November 2009. In June 2007, when interviewed on the state of the UK housing market he was quoted as saying, "It might settle back a little, or remain relatively flat for a bit, but I don't think there's any fundamental overvaluation. Over the next few years it might keep on edging upwards." In a February 2008 Bloomberg News interview, he said: 'The actual size of the downturn is minute, how big is it going to be? I don't know, but it won't be very big.' The Bank of England estimated that by Q1 2009, due to declining house prices, 7% of owner-occupied mortgagors were in negative equity, equivalent to around 700,000 households. His former doctoral students include Sonia Bhalotra, Jan Hatzius, and Gina Raimondo.

=== Awards and honours ===
Nickell was appointed Commander of the Most Excellent Order of the British Empire (CBE) in the 2007 New Year Honours for services to economics and was knighted in the 2015 Birthday Honours.

He was elected a Fellow of the British Academy (FBA) in 1993, a Fellow of the Econometric Society (1980, a Foreign Honorary Member of the American Economic Association (1997), and a Foreign Honorary Member of the American Academy of Arts and Sciences (2006). He is a past President of the Royal Economic Society. In April 2008, the University of Warwick announced that Nickell would receive an honorary Doctor of Science degree at its July degree ceremonies.

=== Publications ===
A list of publications from 1999 until 2004 is available on the LSE website.

In addition to the publications mentioned above, Nickell's publications from 2009-2010 can be found on the Nuffield College website. They include "The British Housing Market: What has been happening?" from July 2009, "The Impact of Immigration on Occupational Wages: Evidence from Britain" which was a joint paper written with Jumana Saleheen from October 2009, and "Does Relative Income Matter? Are the Critics Right?" which was a joint paper written with Richard Layard and Guy Mayrez from March 2009.
