= Union Modernisation Fund =

The Union Modernisation Fund (UMF) was a fund established in 2005 by the Government of the United Kingdom (at this time under the leadership of Tony Blair, who was part of the Labour government) with the aim of providing financial support to British trade unions by supporting "innovative modernisation projects which contribute to a transformational change in the organisational effectiveness of a trade union". The fund was overseen by the independent quasi-autonomous non-governmental organisation (quango) the Union Modernisation Fund Supervisory Board (officially termed a non-departmental public body), which was part of the Department for Business, Innovation and Skills. Three rounds of the UMF were held, with a large amount of money disseminated to trade unions. The Conservatives criticised the fund, calling it a way to keep the unions "sweet", and the then shadow business secretary Alan Duncan called on Gordon Brown to scrap the fund. Only three rounds of funding were ever held, and the board was abolished in 2010 as part of the UK government's quango reforms (as the board's function had been completed). In total the fund gave £7 million to trade unions throughout its existence.
