= National Tenant Voice =

British government-funded organisation

The National Tenant Voice (NTV) was a short-lived British government-funded organisation which was set up in early 2010 by Gordon Brown's Labour Government to ensure that Social Housing tenants had a say in shaping national policy on housing issues. The quango was abolished in July 2010 by the new Conservative-Liberal Democrat Coalition government as part of its economic and governmental reforms (2010 UK quango reforms).

== Background ==
The NTV was a non-departmental public body of the UK Government and was set up in February 2010. It was made up of a National Tenant Council (NTC) of 50 tenants and a Board of 15. Nine of these Board members are drawn from the NTC and 6 are independent members.

The NTV had four main roles:

- advocacy – helping social tenants collectively to speak for themselves as a distinct group in society and to put their views to government and other bodies on any issue affecting social tenants
- research – identifying the impact that policies will have on social tenants and discovering the views of a wide range of tenants on policy issues
- communication – providing good information to tenants and developing a two-way dialogue with them
- support for the representative tenants’ movement – to help it to develop and strengthen

== History ==
On 17 January 2007, Ruth Kelly, the Secretary of State for Communities and Local Government announced a major-shake up of the UK government's arrangements for social housing.

In the following months, Professor Martin Cave, Director of the Centre for Management under Regulation at University of Warwick, led the most comprehensive review of English housing regulation for 30 years. Reporting in June, the Cave Review recommended that a new regulator be set up, separating the regulation and investment responsibilities of the Housing Corporation.

Following Professor Cave's report, the Department of Communities and Local Government set up a project group under the independent chairmanship of Professor Steve Hillditch

Following a significant period of public consultation, the Project Group published its report 'Citizens of Equal Worth' which outlined the proposals for how the National Tenant Voice should be set up and operate. The UK Government accepted all the recommendations of 'Citizens of Equal Worth' in full and the NTV was set up in February 2010

However, the organisation was abolished several months later by the Conservative-Liberal Democrat Coalition Government.

== Key Personnel ==
Chair - Michael Gelling OBE

Chief Executive - Richard Crossley OBE
