= Barker Review of Housing Supply =

The Barker Review of Housing Supply published its final report on 17 March 2004. The report was written by the economist Kate Barker and presented recommendations to the UK government for securing future housing needs. The findings of the report were:

- That the UK had experienced a long term upward trend of 2.4% in real house prices over the past 30 years.
- In order to reduce this rate of increase to 1.8% an additional 70,000 houses in England each year may be required.
- In order to reduce this rate to the EU average of 1.1% an additional 120,000 houses each year may be required.

The policy recommendations outlined in the report were:

- For government to set a goal for improved market affordability.
- Between £1.2 and £1.6 billion of additional funding per annum to meet predicted social housing needs.
- Implementation of a planning gain supplement to capture some of the benefits of development for the community.
- Establishment of a Regional Planning Executive to advise the Regional Planning Body on the scale and distribution of housing required to meet the market affordability target.
- Allocation of additional land in Local Development Frameworks which could be released by market triggers.
- Establishment of a Community Infrastructure Fund to help to unlock some of the barriers to development.
- Limited term retention of council tax by local authorities for new housing developments to promote growth and cover transitional costs.

As a result of recommendations made in the Barker Review, the National Housing and Planning Advice Unit was formed.

== See also ==
- Town and country planning in the United Kingdom
