= Advisory Committee on the Safety of Blood, Tissues and Organs =

The Advisory Committee on the Safety of Blood, Tissues and Organs is a committee in the United Kingdom that advises the governments on 'the most appropriate ways to ensure the safety of blood, cells, tissues and organs for transfusion / transplantation'.
