= Geospatial Commission =

Former committee of the British government

The United Kingdom's Geospatial Commission was an expert group responsible for promoting the use of geospatial data in the country. The commission also defines UK's "geospatial strategy".

Initially established in 2018 as part of the Cabinet Office, it later moved to the Department for Science, Innovation and Technology before being merged into the Government Digital Service in January 2025.

The Geospatial Commission works closely alongside its Partner Bodies, also known as the Geo6:

- British Geological Survey
- Coal Authority
- HM Land Registry
- Ordnance Survey
- UK Hydrographic Office
- Valuation Office Agency

== See also ==
- Department for Science, Innovation and Technology
- Geospatial intelligence
