= George Green =

George Green may refer to:

== Arts and entertainment ==
- George Green (actor), Canadian actor
- George Green (businessman) (1861–1915), British cinema pioneer
- George Green (songwriter) (1952–2011), American co-author of several John Mellencamp hits
- George Dawes Green (born 1954), American novelist and founder of The Moth
- G. F. Green (George Frederick Green, 1911–1977), British fiction writer
- George Hamilton Green (1893–1970), American xylophonist, composer and cartoonist

== Science and medicine ==
- George Green (mathematician) (1793–1841), British mathematical physicist
- George F. Green (dentist) (fl. 1863), American inventor of a pneumatic dental drill
- George Gill Green (1842–1925), American patent medicine entrepreneur and colonel in the American Civil War
- George Kenneth Green (1911–1997), American accelerator physicist
- George E. Green (doctor), American cardiac surgeon

== Sports ==
=== Association football ===
- George Green (footballer, born 1891) (1891–1958), English footballer (Southampton)
- George Green (footballer, born 1901) (1901–1980), English international footballer (Sheffield United)
- George Green (footballer, born 1912), Welsh international footballer
- George Green (footballer, born 1914) (1914–1995), English footballer (Bradford Park Avenue, Huddersfield Town & Reading)
- George Green (footballer, born 1996) (born 1996), English footballer (Everton, Tranmere)

=== Other sports ===
- George Green (Australian rules footballer) (1882–1949), Australian rules footballer
- George Green (baseball) (1884–?), American baseball player
- George Green (cricketer) (1880–1940), English cricketer
- George Green (racing driver) (1927–2008), American NASCAR driver
- George Green (rugby league) (1883–1938), Australian rugby league player
- Dallas Green (baseball) (George Dallas Green, 1934–2017), American baseball player

== Others ==
- George Green (chaplain) (1881–1956), Anglican clergyman in Central Queensland, Australia
- George Green (land agent) (c. 1820–1895), founder of Green's Exchange, father of George Dutton Green
- George Green (Medal of Honor) (1840–1898), English-born Medal of Honor recipient in the American Civil War
- George Green (murderer) (1900–1939), convicted of a double murder in Glenroy, Australia
- George Green (politician) (active 1973–1997), Northern Irish unionist
- George Green (shipbuilder) (1767–1849), English shipbuilder
- George Green (trade unionist) (1908–1989), British trade union leader
- George Dutton Green (1850–1900), Australian land agent, auctioneer, and politician
- George A. Green (1876–1923), American lawyer and politician from New York
- George E. Green (politician) (1858–1917), American businessman and politician from New York
- George Noel Green, South African Navy officer
- George Everitt Green (1880–1895), home child

== Other uses ==
- George Green, Buckinghamshire, English hamlet
- George Green's School, Tower Hamlets, London, England
- George Green (ship), page for ships with this name
- George Green, a park in Wanstead, London, England

== See also ==
- George F. Green (disambiguation)
- George Greene (disambiguation)
