= John Sheldon (trade unionist) =

English trade unionist

John Denby Sheldon OBE
- Born: Leeds, England
- Education: West Leeds High School
- Occupation: Union leader
- Known for: Former general secretary, PCS, NUCPS, PTC and CSU

John Denby Sheldon OBE is a British trade unionist and former general secretary of the Public and Commercial Services Union, and its predecessors: NUCPS, PTC and the CSU.

== Early life ==
Sheldon was educated at West Leeds High School.

== Career ==
Sheldon presided over a period of successive public sector trade union mergers during the 1980s and 1990s.

Sheldon was elected general secretary of the Civil Service Union in 1982, following service as deputy general secretary. During this time, Sheldon and the CSU were amongst those active in opposing the Thatcher Government ban on trade union membership at GCHQ and the subsequent legal challenge in 1984. Sheldon described the government's £1000 tax compensation for GCHQ workers as "Judas Money".

In 1988 he oversaw the subsequent merger with the Society of Civil and Public Servants to form the National Union of Civil and Public Servants and served as its general secretary from 1993. When NUCPS merged with the IRSF in 1996 to form the Public Services, Tax and Commerce Union (PTC), Sheldon continued as joint general secretary along with the IRSF's Clive Brooke. During this period of service, Sheldon served for six years on the General Council of the TUC, standing down in 1998.

In yet another merger, in 1998, PTC joined with the Civil and Public Services Association to form the Public and Commercial Services Union (PCS). Sheldon continued as joint general secretary of PCS, alongside the CPSA's Barry Reamsbottom. Sheldon's right to continue to hold the position of general secretary without election for more than five years was challenged under section 55 of the Trade Union and Labour Relations (Consolidation) Act 1992 but the complaint was dismissed. Sheldon retired on his due date 31 July 2000, leaving Reamsbottom as sole general secretary.

That year, Sheldon was awarded the OBE for his service to trades unionism.

Following retirement, Sheldon remained active in trade union affairs, and chaired the Civil Service Appeals Panel. In 2005, he was invited to lead several independent internal trade unions investigations on behalf of PCS, the FBU and ASLEF.

More recently, Sheldon attended a celebration of the 25th anniversary of the GCHQ campaign.

Trade union offices
Preceded by Les Moody	General Secretary of the Civil Service Union; 1982–1988	Succeeded by Position abolished
Preceded by Leslie Christie	General Secretary of the National Union of Civil and Public Servants; 1993–1996	Succeeded by Position abolished
Preceded by New position	General Secretary of the Public Services, Tax and Commerce Union; 1996–1998; With: Clive Brooke	Succeeded by Position abolished
Preceded by New position	General Secretary of the Public and Commercial Services Union; 1998–2000; With: Barry Reamsbottom	Succeeded by Mark Serwotka
