= George F. Green =

George F. Green may refer to:

- George F. Green (dentist) (fl. 1863), American inventor of a dental drill
- G. F. Green (George Frederick Green, 1911–1977), British fiction writer
- George F. Green (fl. 1949), British creator of an edition of The International Jew
- George Green (trade unionist) (1908-1989), British trade unionist
- George Green (footballer born 1914) (1914–1995), British footballer

== See also ==
- George Green (disambiguation)
