= Kate Losinska =

British trade unionist

Kathleen Mary Losinska, OBE (née Conway; 5 October 1922 – 16 October 2013) was a leading conservative trade unionist in Britain, involved in the Civil and Public Services Association and associated with Sir David Stirling.

She was born in Croydon, the daughter of a soldier, and attended Selhurst Grammar School. Conway entered the civil service at age 17 in the Office of Population Censuses and Surveys. In 1942, she married Stanisław Losinski, a member of the Free Polish air force; the relationship informed her opposition to communism.

In 1975 she was elected President of the Civil and Public Services Association (CPSA) for the first time, beating her nearest rival by 10,000 votes, although she was deposed the following year. She re-took the position from 1979 to 1982, the position going to Militant supporter Kevin Roddy in 1982, before Losinska was re-elected once more from 1983 to 1986. Throughout much of this period she allied herself with Alistair Graham who became CPSA General Secretary from 1982 to 1986.

Losinska's presidencies were surrounded by controversies. During the first year of her presidency she had taken the union's executive after they had censured her for her comments in an article in Reader's Digest, where she had said the union was being infiltrated by Trotskyists and Marxists and wished to reply to her in the union's journal, Red Tape. As chair of the Solidarnosc Foundation, she clashed with Arthur Scargill over his criticisms of Polish trade union Solidarność, and was later appointed Knight Commander of the Order of Polonia Restituta. Her opposition to a merger with the Society of Civil and Public Servants in 1986 led to a split in the Moderate group into Losinska's National Moderate Group and the Democratic Moderate Group. She chaired the Trade Union Committee for European and Transatlantic Understanding, a body funded by NATO and the US Congress.

== Death ==
She died in Limerick Regional Hospital, County Limerick, Ireland on 16 October 2013, aged 91. She was widowed in 2002, and survived by her son.
