= W. J. Brown (trade unionist) =

British trade unionist and politician

William Brown in 1929

William John Brown (13 September 1894 – 3 October 1960) was a British trade unionist, politician and Member of Parliament (MP).

== Life ==
Brown grew up in Margate in Kent and served as general secretary of the Civil Service Clerical Association from 1919 to 1942. He joined the Labour Party and stood for several seats before he was elected at the 1929 general election as a Labour MP for Wolverhampton West. In 1931, he resigned the Labour whip, and joined the New Party led by Oswald Mosley. However, the following day, he resigned from the New Party and thereafter sat as an independent.

== Election history ==
General election, 1929: Wolverhampton West Electorate 51,061
| Party | Candidate | Votes | % | ±% |
|---|---|---|---|---|
| Labour | William Brown | 21,103 | 49.1 | +0.3 |
| Conservative | Robert Bird | 17,237 | 40.2 | −11.2 |
| Liberal | G. H. Roberts | 4,580 | 10.7 | N/A |
| Majority | | 3,866 | 8.9 | N/A |
| Turnout | | 42,920 | 84.1 | −1.8 |
| Labour gain from Conservative | | Swing | +6.8 | |

General election, 1931: Wolverhampton West Electorate: 51,355
| Party | Candidate | Votes | % | ±% |
|---|---|---|---|---|
| Conservative | Robert Bird | 26,181 | 60.5 | +20.3 |
| Independent Labour | William Brown | 17,090 | 39.5 | −9.6 |
| Majority | | 9,091 | 21.0 | N/A |
| Turnout | | 43,271 | 84.3 | +0.2 |
| Conservative gain from Independent Labour | | Swing | +15.0 | |

General election, 1935: Wolverhampton West Electorate 49,537
| Party | Candidate | Votes | % | ±% |
|---|---|---|---|---|
| Conservative | Sir Robert Bird | 19,697 | 54.9 | −5.7 |
| Independent | William Brown | 14,867 | 41.4 | +0.9 |
| Labour | R. Lee | 1,325 | 3.7 | N/A |
| Majority | | 4,830 | 13.5 | −7.5 |
| Turnout | | 35,889 | 72.4 | −9.9 |
| Conservative hold | | Swing | +3.3 | |

He returned to Parliament at a wartime by-election in 1942. David Margesson the Conservative MP for Rugby and Secretary of State for War had been dismissed from his ministerial job after the loss of Singapore to the Japanese, but was ennobled as Viscount Margesson. The major parties had an agreement not to contest by-elections in seats held by any of their members, but Brown stood as an independent candidate in the Rugby by-election on 29 April, and was returned as the independent MP for Rugby.

By-election, 29 April 1942: Rugby Electorate 47,752
| Party | Candidate | Votes | % | ±% |
|---|---|---|---|---|
| Independent | William Brown | 9,824 | 51.8 | n/a |
| Conservative | Claude Holbrook | 9,145 | 48.2 | −13.3 |
| Majority | | 679 | 3.6 | n/a |
| Turnout | | 18,969 | 38.5 | −35.3 |
| Independent hold | | Swing | n/a | |

Brown was re-elected at the 1945 general election as an independent MP against both Conservative and Labour opposition.

General election 1945: Rugby Electorate 62,696
| Party | Candidate | Votes | % | ±% |
|---|---|---|---|---|
| Independent | William Brown | 18,615 | 40.4 | −11.4 |
| Conservative | John Lakin | 17,049 | 37.0 | −11.2 |
| Labour | Ronald Lewis | 10,470 | 22.7 | n/a |
| Majority | | 1,566 | 3.4 | −0.2 |
| Turnout | | 46,144 | 73.6 | +35.1 |
| Independent hold | | Swing | -0.1 | |

However, at the 1950 general election, he stood again as an independent, but came third with 20% of the vote. The seat was gained for Labour by James Johnson.

General election 1950: Rugby Electorate 44,228
| Party | Candidate | Votes | % | ±% |
|---|---|---|---|---|
| Labour | James Johnson | 15,983 | 50.0 | +27.3 |
| Conservative | J. Dance | 14,947 | 38.3 | +1.6 |
| Independent | William Brown | 8,080 | 20.7 | −19.7 |
| Majority | | 1,036 | 2.7 | −0.7 |
| Turnout | | 39,009 | 88.2 | +14.6 |
| Labour gain from Independent | | Swing | | |

In 1951 he ran against Edith Summerskill at Fulham West, with the Conservatives standing aside for him. He lost narrowly.

General election 1951: Fulham West Electorate 45,320
| Party | Candidate | Votes | % | ±% |
|---|---|---|---|---|
| Labour | Edith Summerskill | 20,290 | 51.7 | +0.6 |
| Independent | William Brown | 17,707 | 45.1 | New |
| Liberal | Eric Walcot-Bather | 1,247 | 3.2 | −1.8 |
| Majority | | 2,583 | 6.6 | −0.6 |
| Turnout | | 37,997 | 86.6 | +0.4 |
| Labour hold | | Swing | N/A | |

== Notes ==
Trade union offices
| Preceded by New position | General Secretary of the Civil Service Clerical Association; 1921–1942 | Succeeded by Len White |
Parliament of the United Kingdom
| Preceded by Robert Bird | Member of Parliament for Wolverhampton West; 1929–1931 | Succeeded by Robert Bird |
| Preceded by David Margesson | Member of Parliament for Rugby; 1942–1950 | Succeeded by James Johnson |
