= John Macrae-Gibson =

John Hume Macrae-Gibson (1883 – 26 September 1949) was a British civil servant and trade unionist, who served on the executive of the Fabian Society.

Macrae-Gibson was educated privately. He worked in HM Customs and Excise and as a journalist, and served in the British Army during World War I. After the war, he became the president of the Custom Port Clerks' Association, and through that, served on the executive of the Civil Service Confederation. He was a founder of the Institute of Public Administration.

Macrae-Gibson joined the Independent Labour Party and the Fabian Society, serving on the Fabian executive in 1921 and from 1923 to 1925. He died in 1949.
