= Public Services, Tax and Commerce Union =

Former trade union of the United Kingdom

PTC
- Public Services, Tax and Commerce Union
- Merged with CPSA into: Public and Commercial Services Union
- Founded: January 1996
- Dissolved: March 1998
- Headquarters: London, England
- Location: United Kingdom
- Members: 154,000 (1997)
- Key people: Clive Brooke and John Sheldon, general secretaries
- Affiliations: TUC, CCSU

The Public Services, Tax and Commerce Union (PTC) was a short-lived trade union in the United Kingdom.

The union was formed in January 1996, when the Inland Revenue Staff Federation merged with the National Union of Civil and Public Servants. The general secretaries of the two former unions, Clive Brooke and John Sheldon respectively, became joint general secretaries of the new union.

The union primarily worked in the Civil Service, but also in other public organisations. In March 1998, the union joined with the Civil and Public Services Association (CPSA), forming the Public and Commercial Services Union (PCS).
