= National Union of Civil and Public Servants =

Former trade union of the United Kingdom

NUCPS
- National Union of Civil and Public Servants
- Merged with IRSF into: Public Services, Tax and Commerce Union (PTC)
- Founded: January 1988
- Dissolved: March 1996
- Headquarters: London, England
- Location: United Kingdom
- Key people: John Sheldon
- Affiliations: TUC

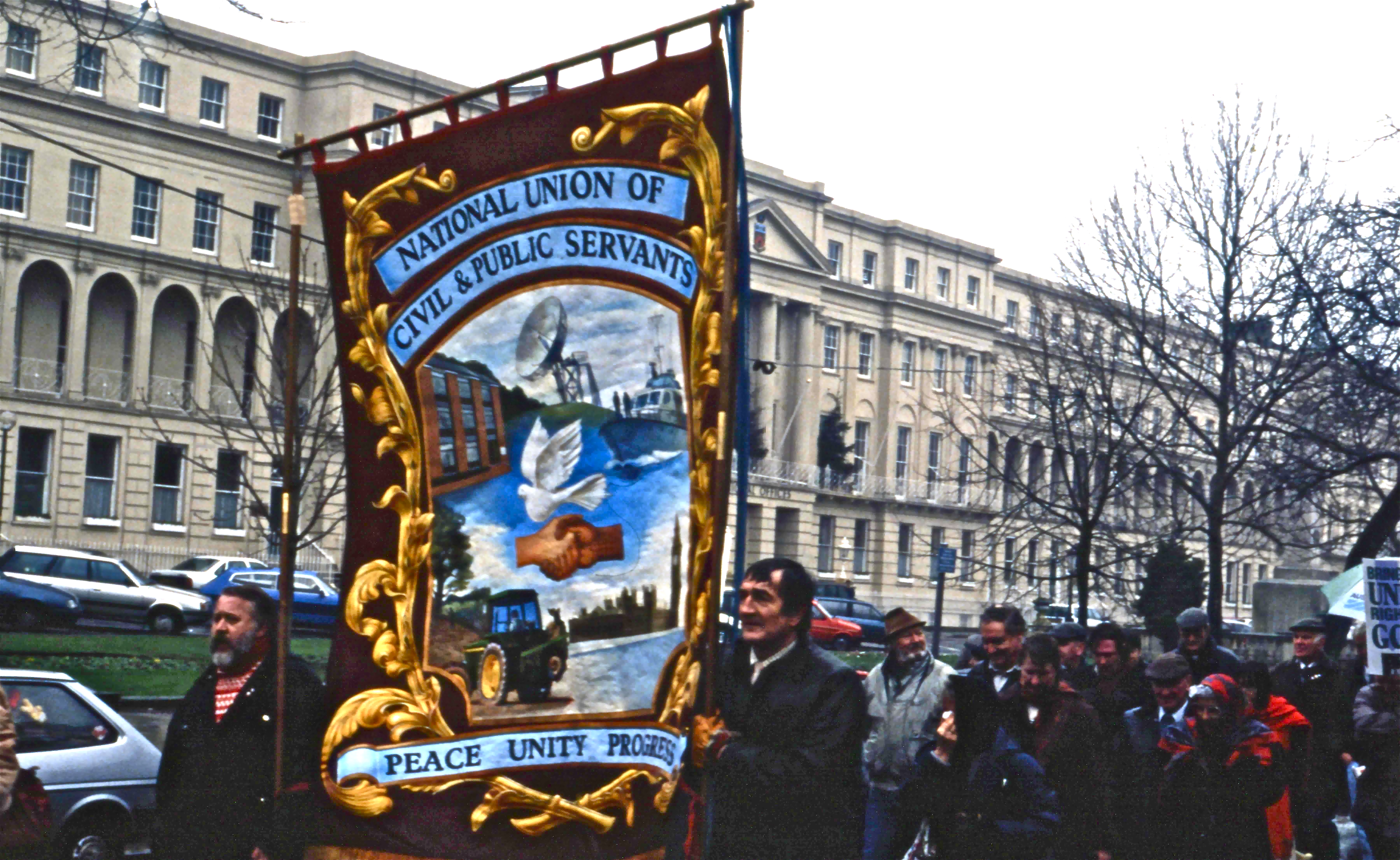
GCHQ march in Cheltenham 1992

The National Union of Civil and Public Servants (NUCPS) was a trade union in the United Kingdom.

The union was formed in 1988 with the merger of the Civil Service Union and the Society of Civil and Public Servants. John Sheldon, former General Secretary of the CSU, became its General Secretary.

The union primarily worked in the UK Civil Service, but also in other public organisations.

In October 1994 NUCPS and the Inland Revenue Staff Federation agreed to merge. The merger took effect in January 1996 to form the Public Services, Tax and Commerce Union (PTC), and that in turn merged in March 1998 with the Civil and Public Services Association (CPSA) to form the Public and Commercial Services Union (PCS).

== General Secretaries ==
1988: Leslie Christie
1993: John Sheldon
