= Civil Service Union =

Former trade union of the United Kingdom

CSU
- Civil Service Union
- Merged into: National Union of Civil and Public Servants
- Founded: 1917
- Dissolved: 1988
- Headquarters: 5 Praed Street, London
- Location: United Kingdom
- Members: 43,513 (1982)
- Publication: The Whip
- Affiliations: Trades Union Congress, CCSU

The Civil Service Union (CSU) was a trade union in the United Kingdom which existed between 1917 and 1988. It represented lower-paid staff within the British Civil Service such as cleaners and messengers.

== History ==
The union was formed in 1917 as the Association of Government Messengers and Attendants and later became the Government Minor and Manipulative Grades Association. The union primarily represented staff who worked in the Civil Service, but also in other public organisations.

The CSU was seen as being more militant than other unions within the civil service and was, along with the Civil and Public Services Association, the first to adopt a strike policy backed by a fighting fund, in 1969. The CSU also supported introducing a closed shop policy within the civil service. By the late 1970s the CSU had 46,827 members, of whom 45,732 worked in the civil service. In January 1988 the union joined with the Society of Civil and Public Servants to form the National Union of Civil and Public Servants.

== Leadership ==
=== General Secretaries ===
1933: Dick Gifford
1943: Victor Carvell
1963: John Vickers
1977: Les Moody
1982: John Sheldon

=== Deputy General Secretaries ===
1944: Robert Anderson
1953: Vacant
1954: Zed Smith
1960: Jon Vickers
1962: Les Moody
1978: John Sheldon
1982:

=== Presidents ===
1933: W. Ewart Llewellyn
1938: George McDouall
1945: Harold Newton
1967: Monty Rose
1984: Margaret Morrison
