= Wakefield College =

General further education and tertiary school in Wakefield, West Yorkshire, England

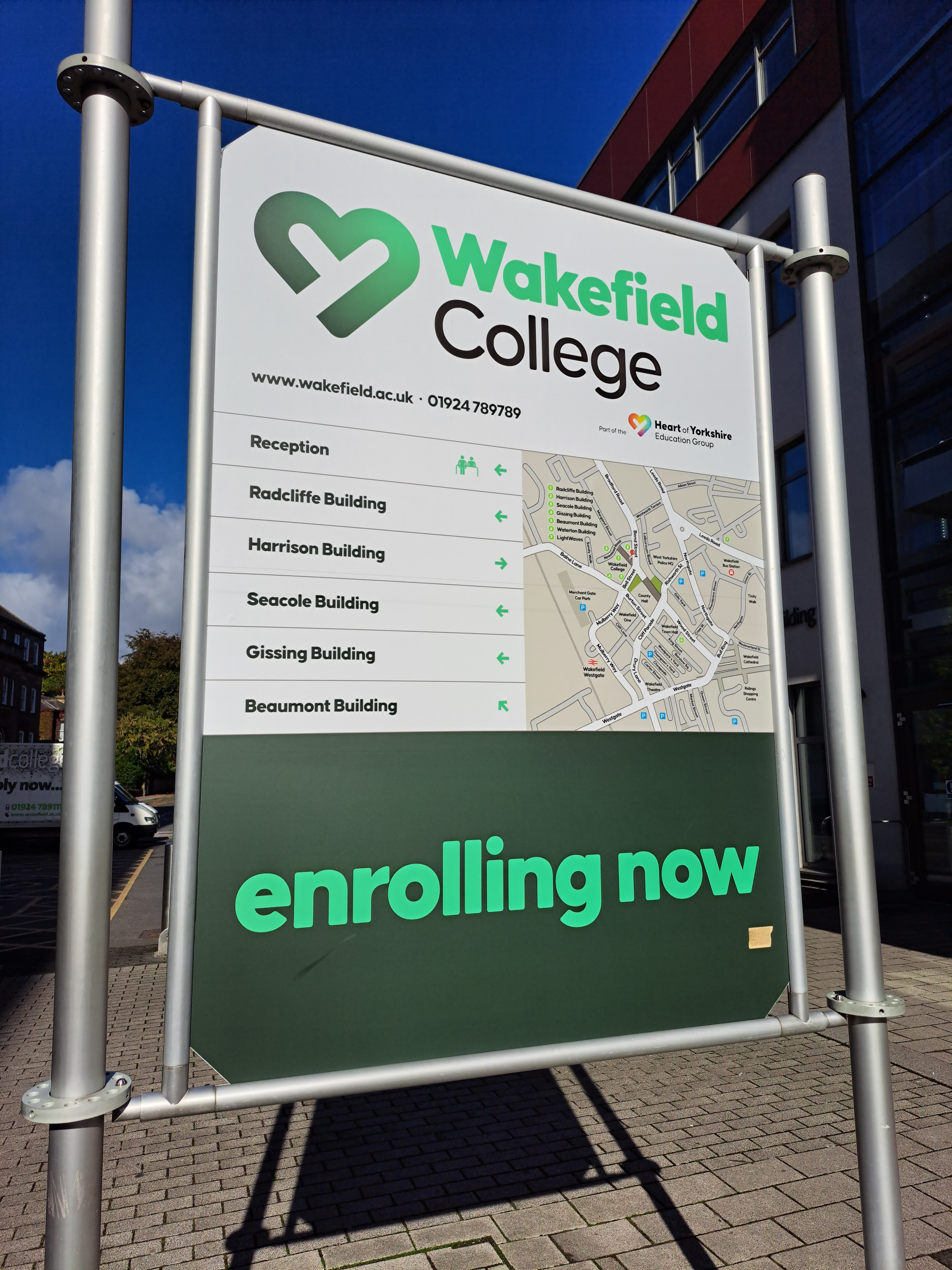

Location
- Margaret Street; Wakefield, West Yorkshire, WF1 2DH; England; 53°41′08″N 1°30′14″W

Information
- Type: General Further Education and Tertiary
- Motto: "Transforming lives through learning"
- Established: 1868
- Local authority: Yorkshire & Humber LSC (although in Wakefield LEA)
- Department for Education URN: 130549 Tables
- Ofsted: Reports
- Principal: Sam Wright
- Gender: Mixed
- Website: http://www.wakefield.ac.uk

Wakefield College is a Further Education and Higher Education College in Wakefield, West Yorkshire, England. It has provided education in the city since 1868. On 1 March 2022, the college merged with Selby College to form the 'Heart of Yorkshire Education Group', with the college retaining its identity but with an updated logo.

== History ==
In the 1950s, it was known as the Wakefield Technical College on Burton Street, becoming the Wakefield Technical and Arts College in the early 1960s and the Wakefield College of Technology and Arts in 1973.

In 1974, it became administered by the City of Wakefield Metropolitan District Council.

== Campuses ==
The higher education courses available are in specialist facilities at all three campuses. There are almost 40 university-level courses offered in conjunction with Huddersfield University, Leeds Beckett University and Bradford University.

Wakefield College has two main campuses in the Wakefield district:

=== Wakefield City Campus ===
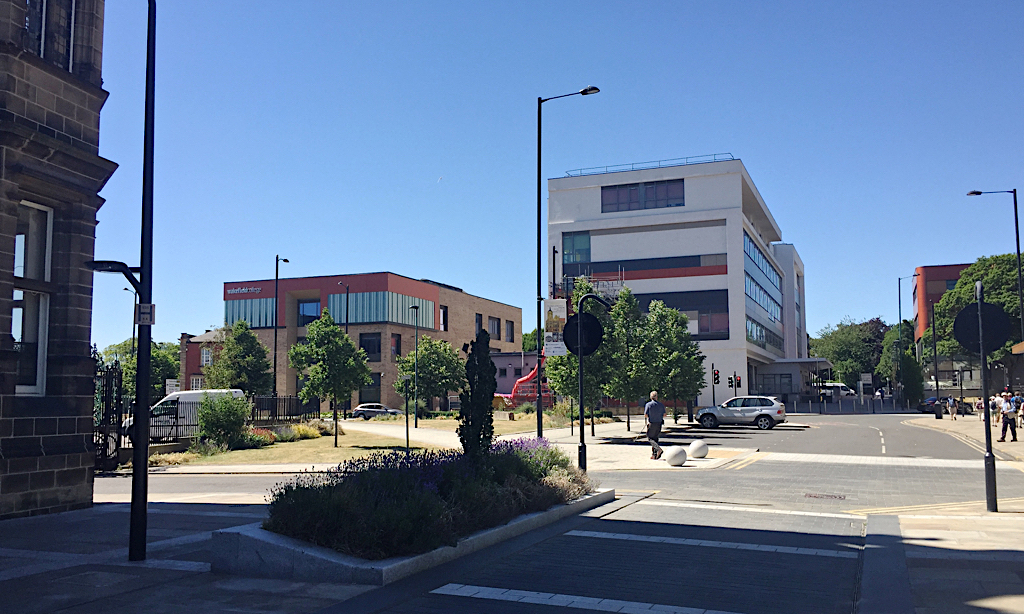
Buildings in Wakefield

This site is at Margaret Street in the city centre and houses the Sixth Form Centre for students studying for AS and A Levels. This campus offers also courses such as ICT and Computing, Office Skills, Hospitality and Catering, Travel and Tourism, Health Studies, Childcare, Animal Care and Languages.

The Wakefield City Centre campus underwent major re-development works, including the 2012 completion of a building designed to house the College's sixth-form, higher education provision and new library. The former Wakefield Museum on Wood Street is now its Performing Arts centre.

=== Castleford Campus ===
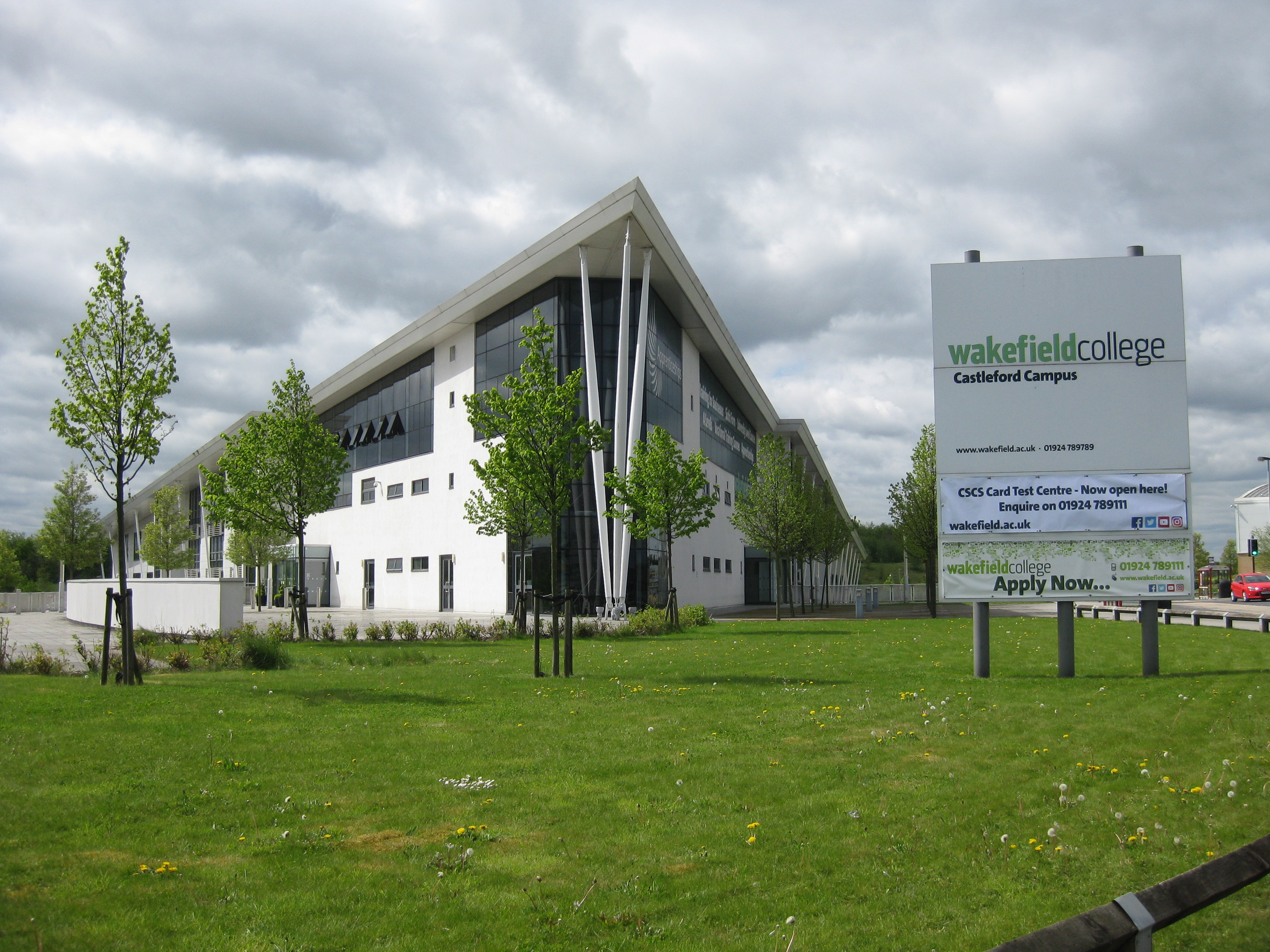
Castleford Campus building

This is a purpose built site in Glasshoughton which opened in 2008, described by the college as a 'distinctive, iconic structure'. The Castleford Campus was formerly known as the skillsXchange. This site houses courses for construction crafts, practical engineering, motor vehicle, hairdressing and beauty therapy, a foundation course, IT and care.

It replaced the Whitwood Campus, in Castleford. This closed campus was the former Whitwood Mining and Technical School, which opened in the 1930s and closed in February 2009. The Whitwood Campus has been redeveloped for housing.

== Former campus ==
=== Thornes Park Campus ===
This site was in the centre of Thornes Park, Wakefield and offered courses such as Foundation Learning, Performing Arts and Music. Courses such as Art and Design, Media and Communications, Business and Management, Sport and Public Services moved to the Wakefield City Campus prior to the campus closing in 2019. The buildings are made up of the former Thornes House High School (also known as Thornes House Grammar School) which opened in 1921 as separate sex school. In 1941 it became a mixed school, and the school suffered a fire in July 1951. It was administered by the City of Wakefield Educational Committee.

It became a 13-18 comprehensive school in 1972 with 1,200 boys and girls. In 1981, it lost its sixth form and became a 13-16 school and, in 1992, merged with nearby Cathedral Middle School. The newly formed school re-located into Cathedral Middle's buildings on Thornes Road. In 1993, it became part of Wakefield College.

== University Centre ==
The College has an established higher education provision, branded as the University Centre Wakefield. The college does have plans to significantly expand its HE provision, submitting its plans to Wakefield Council for consideration in September 2012.

== Collaboration with Crofton Academy ==
In 2012, Wakefield College announced it would be collaborating with Crofton Academy, opening a sixth form centre at the Crofton Academy site, High Street, Crofton. The centre will offer a range of A Level and BTEC courses.

== Alumni ==
- Amy Garcia, BBC Look North newsreader.

=== Alumni of Thornes House School ===
Alumni of Thornes House School are known as Old Thornesians.

- Victor Adebowale, Baron Adebowale
- Clive Brooke, Baron Brooke of Alverthorpe, General Secretary from 1988-95 of the Inland Revenue Staff Federation
- Nick Gibb, Conservative MP since 1997 for Bognor Regis and Littlehampton
- Vardis
- Sir Rodney Walker, Chairman from 1993-2002 of the Rugby Football League

== Wakefield College Students' Union ==
Wakefield College Students' Union is the official students' union. Its role is to provide a representative channel between all students and the authorities of the college as well as to provide services and run events and campaigns.

=== Executive committee ===
The Union's Executive Committee are elected once every year, usually at the end of the previous academic year and again, if necessary, at the start of the appropriate academic year to fill the remaining unfilled posts. The committee currently has 11 members.

The Executive Committee and certain members of staff are responsible for running the union as a whole.
