= George Greene =

George Greene may refer to:

- George Greene (traveller) (born 1747/8), traveller, land-steward and writer
- George S. Greene (1801–1899), Union general during the Civil War
- George Washington Greene (1811–1883), United States historian
- George Woodward Greene (1831–1895), U.S Representative from New York
- George Greene (judge) (1817–1880), former Iowa Supreme Court justice
- George Greene (Australian politician) (1838–1911), New South Wales politician
- George Greene, real name of former NFL player Tiger Greene

== See also ==
- George Green (disambiguation)
