= Lord Brooke =

Lord Brooke or Baron Brooke is the traditional courtesy title of the Earl of Warwick. It could also refer to:

- Peter Brooke, Baron Brooke of Sutton Mandeville (born 1934), a British politician
- Clive Brooke, Baron Brooke of Alverthorpe (born 1942), a British trade unionist
- Henry Brooke, Baron Brooke of Cumnor (1903–1984), a British politician who served as Home Secretary
