= 1942 Rugby by-election =

UK parliamentary by-election

The 1942 Rugby by-election was a parliamentary by-election for the British House of Commons constituency of Rugby on 29 April 1942.

== Vacancy ==
The by-election was caused by the resignation of the sitting Conservative MP, David Margesson in March 1942. He had been MP here since gaining the seat from the Liberal, Ernest Brown in 1924. Margesson had been Secretary of State for War until February 1942 when Winston Churchill sacked him following the fall of Singapore.

== Election history ==
Rugby had been won by the Conservative Party at every election since 1924 and was a safe seat. The result at the last general election was as follows;

1935 general election : Rugby Electorate 46,028
Party	Candidate	Votes	%	±%
Conservative	David Margesson	20,905	61.6	−8.3
Labour	Harold William Fenner	13,061	38.5	+8.5
Majority		7,844	23.1	−16.8
Turnout		33,966	73.8	−5.1
Conservative hold		Swing		

== Candidates ==
The local Conservatives selected 56-year-old Lt-Col. Sir Claude Holbrook. He was a serving officer with the Royal Army Service Corps who had also served in the European War from 1914 to 1918. He was appointed a Deputy Lieutenant for Warwickshire in 1931. He had been Chairman of Rugby Conservative Association since 1927. He was Officer-in-Charge of a big Ordnance Depot. The Labour Party had selected A E Millett to contest a general election expected to take place in 1939–40. He had fought Yeovil in 1935, coming third behind the Liberal. Although the general election had not taken place because of the war, he had remained active for the Labour party in Rugby and was still officially their candidate. In accordance with the terms of the wartime electoral truce, Millett was not put forward by the Rugby Labour party. The Liberals had not fought the constituency since 1929 and had no candidate in place. The Rugby Liberals had remained active through their chairman, M E Avery, but did not put forward a candidate.

However, an Independent candidate did emerge to challenge the Conservatives, in the shape of 48-year-old William Brown. He had a history of going up against the party machines. Although he was elected Labour MP for Wolverhampton West in 1929 he had resigned from the party in 1930 along with Oswald Mosley when the Labour government failed to tackle unemployment. However, he did not join Mosley's New Party and instead continued in parliament as an Independent Labour member. Under that label, he was defeated in the 1931 elections even though no official Labour candidate opposed him. By the 1935 elections, the Wolverhampton West Labour party did oppose him but did very poorly, while Brown came second standing as an Independent. Brown did however have a political power-base, having been General Secretary of the Civil Service Clerical Association since he founded the organisation in 1921. The union had been affiliated to the Labour party until the Trade Disputes and Trade Unions Act 1927 was passed following the General Strike of 1926.

== Campaign ==
Polling day was set for 29 April 1942. When nominations closed, it was to reveal a two horse race, the Conservative local man, Holbrook, against the Independent outsider, Brown. Holbrook demonstrated what he thought about the situation by stating that the electors of the division were against holding an election.

Brown chose as his election agent, another outsider in Reg Hipwell who was a Services Journalist and had himself fought the 1941 Hampstead by-election as an Independent candidate.

On 14 April 1942 Brown's 6 point policy plan was released in the Birmingham Post; 1. Total efficiency in total war effort. 2. Reconstitution of the Government on a non-party basis. 3. Breaking through the contradictions in production, the Civil Service, politics and propaganda, which hinder the war effort. 4. Maintenance of the freedom of the public Press and of public criticism against the growing tendency of the Government towards suppression. 5. Democratisation of the Army. 6. Real equality of sacrifice.

At the start of the campaign Holbrook was sharply criticised by a Magistrate in open Court for being very unhelpful to the police, who had been trying to enquire into thefts from the Ordnance Depot of which he was the Officer-in-Charge. The case had been widely reported in the Press. Brown telegraphed Prime Minister Winston Churchill drawing attention to the reports asking if Churchill proposed to send a letter commending Holbrook to the electors of Rugby. Churchill did not reply but did as Brown had expected.

As was usual, Holbrook received a joint letter of endorsement from all the leaders of the parties in the coalition. One of these signatories was Ernest Brown the leader of the Liberal Nationals, who had been the MP in the constituency until defeated by Margesson in 1924.

The Rugby Labour party was split over Brown's candidature. Some members wanted to support him because he was a leading trade unionist and easily to the left of Holbrook, while others felt that it was important to follow the party leader, Clement Attlee, who had endorsed Holbrook. The National Council of Labour passed a resolution condemning Brown as a disruptive individual, not a fit and proper person to represent the working classes.

Holbrook lost his temper and made some very damaging statements about Brown, which seemed to gain Brown public sympathy. Embarrassed by Brown's telegram to Churchill, which had become front-page news, he issued a writ of libel against Brown. This ensured that Brown would be kept quiet on further raising issues in connection with the depot. Holbrook was to later drop the case and paid all costs.

Campaign slogans played their part; the Conservative campaign for Holbrook - "Vote for Holbrook, the man whom Churchill wants". The Brown campaign countered this with "Vote for Brown, the man whom Churchill needs!"

The issue of the Second Front in Europe came to the fore late in the campaign. Holbrook's position was that it was too soon to establish it. This upset the local Communist party, who had been instructed by their headquarters in London to call on their supporters to vote for Holbrook as the best way of getting it. Brown belatedly came out in support of the Second Front. The retired Rugby Conservative MP, David Margesson warned voters that Adolf Hitler would gloat if Brown got in.

On the eve of poll, Holbrook wrote an article for the local press entitled "Why I Won".

== Result ==
Holbrook had been premature with his article for the papers as he lost.

Rugby by-election, 1942 Electorate 47,752
Party	Candidate	Votes	%	±%
Independent	William Brown	9,824	51.8	New
Conservative	Claude Vivian Holbrook	9,145	48.2	−13.3
Majority		679	3.6	N/A
Turnout		18,969	38.5	−35.3
Independent gain from Conservative		Swing		

== Aftermath ==
In 1945, free from the restrictions of the electoral truce, the Labour party fielded a candidate against Brown and finished last. Brown held onto his seat, the result at the following general election;

General election 1945: Rugby Electorate 62,696
Party	Candidate	Votes	%	±%
Independent	William Brown	18,615	40.4	−11.4
Conservative	John Lakin	17,049	37.0	−11.2
Labour	Ronald Lewis	10,470	22.7	N/A
Majority		1,566	3.4	−0.2
Turnout		46,144	73.6	+35.1
Independent hold		Swing	-0.1	

== See also ==
- List of United Kingdom by-elections
- United Kingdom by-election records
