= Peter Parker (author) =

British writer (born 1954)

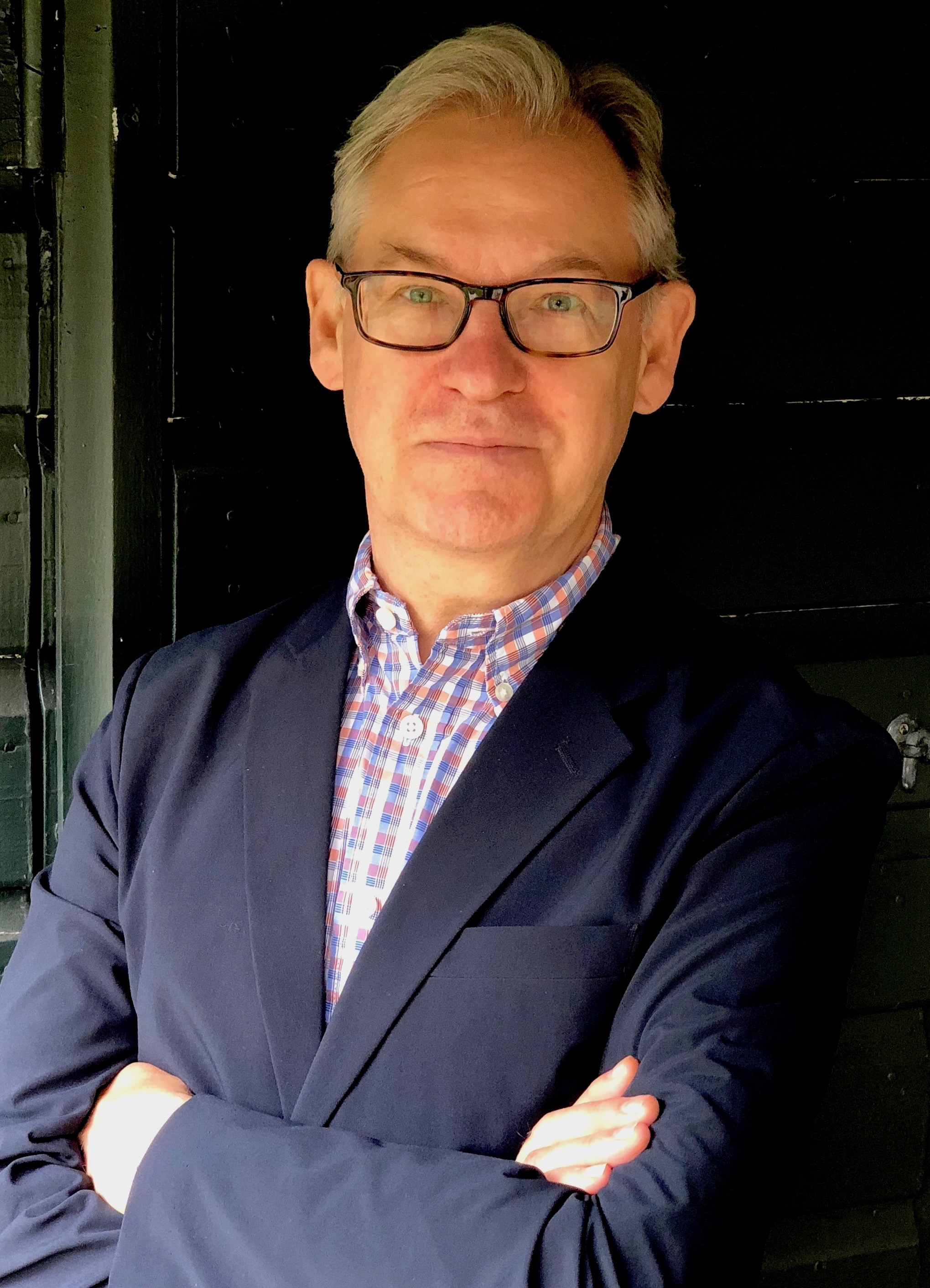
- Parker in 2019
- Born: Peter Robert Nevill Parker; 2 June 1954 (age 72); Herefordshire, England
- Education: English Literature, University College, London
- Occupations: Biographer; historian; journalist; editor
- Writing career
- Period: 1980–present
- Genres: Biography, history, gardening, architecture, non-fiction
- Website: www.peterparkerwriter.com

Peter Parker (born 2 June 1954) is a British biographer, historian, journalist and editor. He was elected a Fellow of the Royal Society of Literature in 1997.

== Life and career ==
=== Education ===
Parker was born to Edward Parker and Patricia Sturridge on 2 June 1954 in Herefordshire in the West Midlands of England. He attended the Downs Malvern in Colwall and Canford School in Dorset, and read English literature at University College London. He began a career in literary journalism while working in the Design Centre's bookshop in the 1980s, contributing regular book reviews to Gay News and The London Magazine. He published a number of short stories in The London Magazine, Fiction, Critical Quarterly and three PEN/Arts Council anthologies.

=== Books ===
Parker subsequently turned to writing non-fiction, and his first book, The Old Lie: The Great War and the Public-School Ethos was published by Constable in 1987. A paperback edition, with a new introduction, was published by Bloomsbury in 2007.

Parker's second book Ackerley: The Life of J. R. Ackerley was also published by Constable in the UK in 1989 and by Farrar, Straus and Giroux in America.

He edited (and wrote much of) two literary encyclopaedias: A Reader's Guide to the Twentieth-Century Novel published in the UK by Fourth Estate and Helicon in 1994 and in America by Oxford University Press in 1995, and A Reader's Guide to Twentieth-Century Writers published in the UK by Fourth Estate and Helicon in 1995 and in America by Oxford University Press in 1996.

Parker then wrote the "definitive" biography of Christopher Isherwood. The book was published in 2004, on the centenary of Isherwood's birth, by Pan Macmillan in the UK under the title Isherwood and by Random House in America under the title Isherwood: A Life Revealed. David Thomson, in The New Republic described it as, "Immense and magnificent … A Life Revealed is a modest subtitle for such a daunting process of reconstruction and re-appraisal."

The Last Veteran: Harry Patch and the Legacy of War was published by Fourth Estate on Armistice Day in 2009. Simon Heffer in The Daily Telegraph wrote, "A fine work of research and of history. Parker tells the story of how the War came to an end and how the aftermath was coped with."

Parker's Housman Country: Into the Heart of England, is cultural history of A Shropshire Lad, was published by Little, Brown in 2016. It was among the Financial Times', The Spectator's, the Evening Standard's and The Sunday Times' Best Books of 2016. The book was published in the US in 2017 by Farrar, Straus and Giroux and was a The New York Times Book Review Editor's Choice and nominated for the 2017 PEN/Jacqueline Bograd Weld Award for Biography.

Parker wrote a discursive account of the history and origins of plant names in his book A Little Book of Latin for Gardeners published by Little, Brown in 2018.

Parker has edited Some Men in London: Queer Life, 1945–1969, a major anthology which uncovers the rich reality of life for queer men in London. The book, published by Penguin Classics, is divided in two volumes, 1945–1959 and 1960–1967 respectively. Matthew Parris, writing for the Spectator, described it as 'quite simply, a work of genius.' The anthology was The Times and The Sunday Times History Book of the Year 2024.

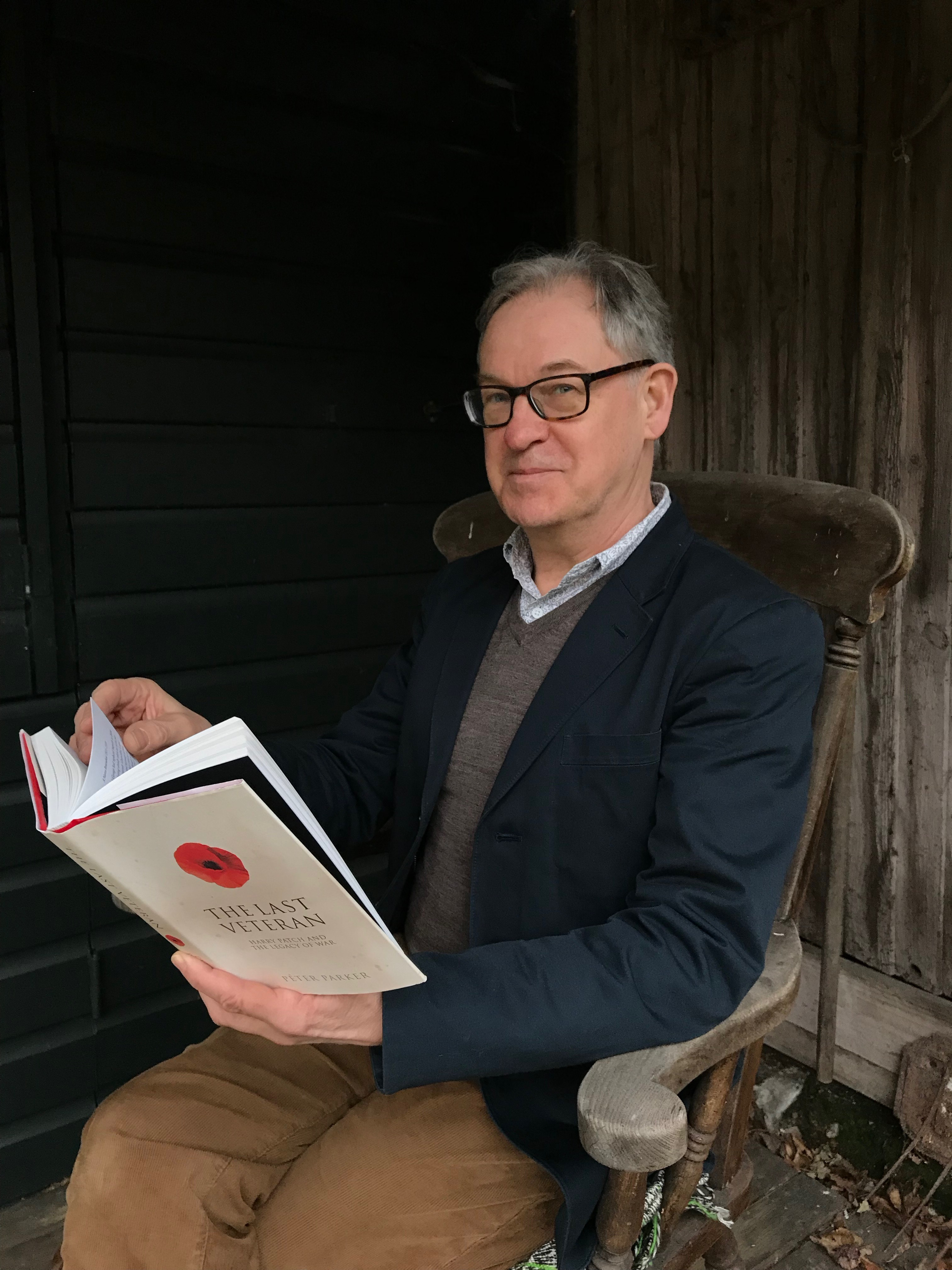
Parker in London, January 2019

=== Journalism ===
Parker was an associate editor of the Oxford Dictionary of National Biography (2004) and remains an advisory editor for the regular updates to the project.

Among the books to which Parker has contributed are Scribner's British Writers (on L. P. Hartley, 2002), the seventh edition of The Oxford Companion to English Literature (2009), Fifty Gay and Lesbian Books Everybody Must Read (2009) and Britten's Century, published in 2013 to mark the centenary of the composer Benjamin Britten. His edition of G. F. Green's 1952 novel In the Making was published as a Penguin Modern Classic in 2012, and in 2016 he wrote an introduction to the Slightly Foxed edition of Diana Petre's 1975 memoir The Secret Orchard of Roger Ackerley. A full-length animated feature film of J. R. Ackerley's book My Dog Tulip, for which he collaborated on the script and acted as advisor to the producers, was released in 2010.

Parker was a member of the executive committee of English PEN from 1993 to 1997 and a trustee of the PEN Literary Foundation, acting as chair from 1999 to 2000. He was on the committee of the London Library from 1999 to 2002, subsequently becoming a trustee (2004–07); chair of the Royal Horticultural Society's Lindley Library Advisory Committee (2009–2013); and vice-chair of the Council of the Royal Society of Literature (2008–14). From 2014 until 2017 he was a visiting fellow in the School of Arts at the University of Northampton.

Since 1979 Parker has been a frequent contributor of reviews and features to numerous newspapers and magazines, including The Listener, The Independent, The Daily Telegraph, The Sunday Times, The Spectator, The Times Literary Supplement, the New Statesman, The Oldie, Slightly Foxed, Apollo and the gardening quarterly Hortus. He was on the editorial board of the London Library Magazine (2008–2019) while he continues to serve on the editorial board of RIBA's A Magazine. Since 1990 he has been one of the judges of the annual Ackerley Prize for literary autobiography, becoming chair in 2007, and he was for several years one of the judges of the Encore Award for a second novel.
