= Bill Kendall (trade unionist) =

British trade unionist (1923–2000)

William Leslie Kendall CBE (10 March 1923 – 5 March 2000) was a British trade unionist.

Kendall grew up in South Shields, where he joined the Communist Party of Great Britain (CPGB). He served in the Royal Air Force during World War II, before finding work as a clerk at the National Insurance offices. He also joined the Civil Service Clerical Association (CSCA), becoming branch secretary, and rejoined the CPGB.

After only a year, Kendall left the CPGB, having become a Catholic, and developed an interest in liberation theology. From 1952, he worked full-time for the CSCA and, in 1967, he was elected as its general secretary.

As general secretary of what was now known as the Civil and Public Services Association (CPSA), Kendall was known as being on the right-wing on the trade union movement, while many union members were well to his left. He reluctantly agreed to the union adopting a policy permitting members to take strike action, but was keen to use this only among sections which did not work directly with the public.

In 1976, Kendall moved to become secretary of the staff side of the Whitley Council for the Civil Service, in 1980 becoming secretary of its successor, the Council of Civil Service Unions. In this role, he was known for his close working relationship with his press officer, Jimmy O'Dea, and spent considerable amounts of time courting the media. Although nominated repeatedly for the General Council of the Trades Union Congress, he was never elected, and he retired in 1983.

Trade union offices
Preceded by Len Wines	General Secretary of the Civil and Public Services Association; 1967 – 1976	Succeeded by Ken Thomas
Preceded by John Dryden	Secretary of the National Whitley Council (Staff Side); 1976 – 1980	Succeeded by ?
Preceded by New position	Secretary of the Council of Civil Service Unions; 1980 – 1983	Succeeded by Peter Jones
