= Court Officers' Association =

Former trade union of the United Kingdom

- Merged into: Civil and Public Services Association
- Founded: 1885
- Dissolved: 1974
- Location: United Kingdom
- Members: 6,428 (1974)
- Affiliations: TUC, CSA

The Court Officers' Association was a trade union representing staff in the British county court system.

The union described itself as having been founded in 1885 as the County Court Association, although a union of this name existed as early as 1881. It renamed itself as the County Court (Clerical and Officers) Association in 1912, and as the County Court Officers' Association in 1921. The union represented clerks, bailiffs, ushers and typists working in the county courts, and was the only union recognised by the government to negotiate on their behalf.

In 1924, county court staff officially became civil servants, and the union thereafter worked closely with other civil service unions. It joined the Civil Service Confederation, and then in 1939 became a founder member of its successor, the Civil Service Alliance. It joined the Trades Union Congress in 1966, at which time it had 5,190 members. From 1969, it was represented on the staff side of the Whitley Council for the civil service.

In 1974, the union merged into the Civil and Public Services Association.
