= Tony Christopher, Baron Christopher =

British businessman, trade unionist and life peer (1925–2026)

The Right Honourable The Lord Christopher CBE FRSA

Member of the House of Lords
- Lord Temporal
- Life peerage 30 July 1998 – 13 May 2026

Personal details
- Born: Anthony Martin Grosvenor Christopher; 25 April 1925 Leckhampton, Gloucestershire, England
- Died: 12 July 2026 (aged 101)
- Party: Labour
- Spouse: Adela Joy Thompson (m. 1953; died 2024)
- Education: Cheltenham Grammar School; Westminster College of Commerce

Anthony Martin Grosvenor Christopher, Baron Christopher (25 April 1925 – 12 July 2026) was a British businessman, trade unionist, tax official and Labour life peer. He was the oldest serving British parliamentarian and the last parliamentarian to have served in the Second World War, until his departure from the House of Lords on 13 May 2026.

== Early life ==
Anthony Martin Grosvenor Christopher was born in Leckhampton, Gloucestershire, on 25 April 1925, the son of George and Helen Christopher. He had a sister, Patricia. In 1931, the family moved to Cheltenham, where Christopher attended Naunton Park Primary School and Cheltenham Grammar School from 1931 to 1941. He also studied at Westminster College of Commerce.

Between 1941 and 1944, Christopher worked as an articled pupil and agricultural valuer in Gloucester. From 1944 to 1948, he served in the Royal Air Force, having enlisted during the latter stages of the Second World War. During the war, his neighbour's house was bombed by the Luftwaffe.

In the early 1950s, Christopher moved to Croydon in South London, before then moving to Kensington in West London. In 1948, he started a career at the Inland Revenue, where he would work his way up before departing in 1957 to work full-time for the Inland Revenue Staff Federation.

== Trade union career ==
Between 1976 and 1988, Christopher was general secretary of the Inland Revenue Staff Federation. Since 1981, he was director of the TU Fund Managers Ltd and from 1983 on its chairman. Also from 1983, he was elected auditor of the International Confederation of Free Trade Unions and from 1988 on, he worked therein as Industrial and Public Affairs Consultant.

Christopher worked for NACRO from 1956 to 1998, from 1956 as member of council and from 1973 as chairman. He was member of the TUC General Council from 1976 to 1989 and its chairman in 1988 and 1989. For the Civil Service Building Society, he was director between 1958 and 1987, as well as chairman between 1978 and 1987. He was member of the Inner London Probation and After-care Committee from 1966 to 1979, of the Tax Reform Committee from 1974 to 1980 and of the Royal Commission on Distribution of Income and Wealth in 1978 and 1979. Christopher was also member of the Independent Broadcasting Authority from 1978 to 1983, of the council of the Institute of Manpower Studies from 1984 to 1989 and of the Economic and Social Research Council from 1985 to 1988. Between 1983 and 1986, he was chairman of the Tyre Industry Economic Development Council and between 1985 and 1990 vice-president of the Building Societies Association. In 1987 and 1988, he was director of the Birmingham Midshires Building Society. Christopher was further member of the General Medical Council (GMC) from 1989 to 1994, of the Audit Commission from 1989 to 1995 and of the Broadcasting Complaints Commission from 1989 to 1997.

He was trustee of the Commonwealth Trades Union Council Charitable Trust from 1985 to 1989 and of the Save The Children Fund from 1985 to 1990. For the Institute for Public Policy Research, he was trustee from 1989 to 1994 and treasurer from 1990 to 1994. Since 1981, Christopher was also trustee of the Trades Union Unit Trust Charitable Trust and since 1998 of the Douglas Houghton Memorial Fund.

== Personal life and death ==
From 1953 until her death, Christopher was married to Adela Joy Thompson. Lady Christopher died on 11 October 2024, at the age of 105.

Lord Christopher died on 11 July 2026, aged 101.

== Honours ==
In the 1984 New Year Honours, Christopher was appointed a Commander of the Order of the British Empire (CBE) and in 1989 a Fellow of the Royal Society of Arts (FRSA). On 30 July 1998, he was created a life peer as Baron Christopher, of Leckhampton in the County of Gloucestershire, taking the Labour whip. Following the death of Lord Carrington in July 2018, Christopher became the oldest sitting member of the House of Lords. In March 2021, he took a leave of absence from the House of Lords; he returned to the House of Lords in May 2024. In May 2026, he was removed from the House of Lords because of non-attendance in the preceding session of Parliament.

== Works ==
- Policy for Poverty (1970)
- The Wealth Report (1979)
- The Wealth Report 2 (1982)

Trade union offices
Preceded by Cyril Plant	General Secretary of the Inland Revenue Staff Federation; 1976–1988	Succeeded by Clive Brooke
Preceded by Clive Jenkins	President of the Trades Union Congress; 1989	Succeeded by Ada Maddocks
