= Len White (trade unionist) =

British trade union leader (1897–1955)

Leonard Charles White (12 November 1897 – 11 May 1955) was a British trade union leader.

White served as deputy general secretary of the Civil Service Clerical Association (CSCA) for some years, and was in this role in 1939 when he additionally became the first general secretary of the Civil Service Alliance. In 1942, he became general secretary of the CSCA after his predecessor, William Brown, was elected to Parliament.

White was known as a communist sympathiser, and although he never joined the Communist Party of Great Britain, he served on the editorial board of the Daily Worker from 1946. Brown was highly critical of this, and campaigned for the CSCA to ban communists from holding office. This was not successful, and White became known as a skillful and impartial leader. In 1954, he was offered general secretaryship of the Civil Service Whitley Council, the leading post in civil service trade unionism. However, he died suddenly in May 1955, before he could take up the role.

Trade union offices
Preceded by William Brown	General Secretary of the Civil Service Clerical Association; 1942 – 1955	Succeeded by George Green
