= John Ellis (trade unionist) =

British trade union leader

John Norman Ellis (22 February 1939 – 28 February 2011) was a British trade union leader.

Born in the Osmondthorpe area of Leeds, Ellis attended the Leeds College of Commerce before finding work delivering mail for the Post Office. In 1958, he moved to the Ministry of Public Building and Works where he worked as a clerk, and became active in the Civil and Public Services Association (CPSA).

In 1968 Ellis was appointed as the full-time assistant secretary of the CPSA, holding the post until 1982, when he became the union's deputy general secretary. In 1986 he was elected as general secretary, and from 1988 also served on the General Council of the Trades Union Congress. In 1992 he stood down from his existing posts to become secretary of the Council of Civil Service Unions, also joining the Industrial Tribunal Panel.

Ellis retired in 1995 and afterwards worked with the Civil Service Pensioners' Alliance, and the Labour Party, which he represented on Caterham Valley Parish Council. He was appointed OBE in the 1995 Birthday Honours.

Trade union offices
Preceded by Alistair Graham	General Secretary of the Civil and Public Services Association; 1988 – 1992	Succeeded by Barry Reamsbottom
Preceded by Peter Jones	Secretary of the Council of Civil Service Unions; 1992 – 1996	Succeeded by Charles Cochrane
