= Jon Vickers (trade unionist) =

British trade unionist

James Oswald Noel Vickers (6 April 1916 – 1 June 2008), known as Jon Vickers from his initials, was a British trade union leader.

== Early life and education ==
Born in London on 6 April 1916, Vickers was educated at Stowe School and Queens' College, Cambridge, where he read History and English. He joined the Communist Party of Great Britain, influenced by the death of his school contemporary, John Cornford, in the Spanish Civil War in 1936. It was here he met fellow Cambridge Communist Party member Winifred 'Freddie' Mary Lambert, later to become his wife.

== Wartime ==
At the outbreak of war in 1939 he was called up, joining the Royal Army Service Corps as 2nd Lieutenant. He was posted to the 5th brigade of the BEF. Whilst on leave in February 1940 he married 'Freddie' Lambert in Cambridge. A few months later, in May 1940, Vickers was wounded and captured shortly before Dunkirk. He subsequently spent five years in Prisoner of War Camps including a period at Stalag XXI-D in Poznań, Poland.

Towards the end of the war, as prisoners were moved ahead of the retreating German army, he managed to escape in woods near Kassel and a few days later made contact with an American tank crew.

In 1942, Freddie was injured by falling timbers in a bombed house in Cambridge and she subsequently had to have both legs amputated below the knee. James and Freddie were finally reunited at Baker Street tube station.

== Post-war career ==
In 1946, Vickers was appointed warden of Wedgwood Memorial College where he worked until, in 1949, he was forced to resign following complaints of 'communist bias'. His next job was with the Electrical Trades Union (ETU) research department and he went on to become its education officer. One of his achievements with the ETU was the establishment of Britain's first residential trade union training facility at Esher Place in 1953. During his time with the ETU, he became increasingly disillusioned with the Communist Party and, following the Soviet invasion of Hungary in response to the Hungarian Revolution of 1956, both he and Freddie left the CP, together joining the Labour Party soon after.

In 1960 he became deputy general secretary of the Civil Service Union and became general secretary in 1963. He was influential in the success of the women night cleaners' recognition dispute in 1972. He also served as a member, and from 1975 as chairman, of the staff side of the civil service Whitley Council. He was awarded the OBE in December 1976.

== Later life ==
Vickers retired in 1977 but continued to serve on Industrial Tribunals for several years after. He also taught Industrial Relations on management courses. Freddie died on 23 March 2006 and Jon died on 1 June 2008. They are survived by their daughter, Salley Vickers, the literary novelist and their son James, Professor of Mathematics at the University of Southampton.

== Works ==
- Radice, Giles; Vickers, J.O.N. (March 1971). Divide and rule : the Industrial Relations Bill. London: Fabian Society. ISBN 0-7163-0406-6.
- Vickers, J. O. N. (1971). "A trade without collective bargaining". Industrial Relations Journal. 2 (2): 46–51. doi:10.1111/j.1468-2338.1971.tb00794.x.

Trade union offices
Preceded by G. V. Carvell	General Secretary of the Civil Service Union; 1963–1977	Succeeded by Les Moody
