= John Macreadie =

Scottish trade unionist

John Macreadie (19 September 1946 – 22 December 2010) was a Scottish trade unionist and a longstanding supporter of Militant.

== Early life and career ==
Born in Glasgow, he left the city in his teens in the 60's to take up a job at the Ministry of Transport in London, where he was also active within the Acton Young Socialists. He joined the Civil and Public Services Association and was appointed to a full-time post within the union in 1970. In 1977 he led the successful CAA Air Traffic Control Assistants strike.

== 1986 General Secretary Election Controversy ==
In 1986, Macreadie stood for the post of General Secretary of the CPSA. In the elections, Macreadie initially won the ballot. However, the election was blocked and the courts ordered it to be re-run, with John Ellis receiving 42,000 votes, Macreadie receiving 31,000, and the Broad Left 84, backed by the Communist Party gaining 13,000.

Macreadie was later elected as Deputy General Secretary of the union in 1987. Macreadie also served on the General Council of the TUC from 1987 to 1988.

== Later career ==
After being unsuccessful in further senior union official elections, Macreadie continued as a national CPSA, then PCS officer, eventually taking up a position as advisor to Mark Serwotka when he was elected as General Secretary in 2002. He retired from the PCS in 2005 and died of a brain tumour in France in December 2010, aged 64.
