= George Green (ship) =

At least two vessels have been named George Green:

- George Green (1829 ship) was wrecked on her maiden voyage. She had been launched on 26 December 1829 at Newcastle and was sailing to London to be delivered to her owners when she wrecked on 30 January.
- George Green (1849 ship), of 886 tons, was built by Jotham Stetson. She was an American vessel that stranded near Dartmouth, Devon, England on 22 January 1877 with the loss of 24 lives.
