= Sheila Greenwald =

American writer and illustrator of children's books

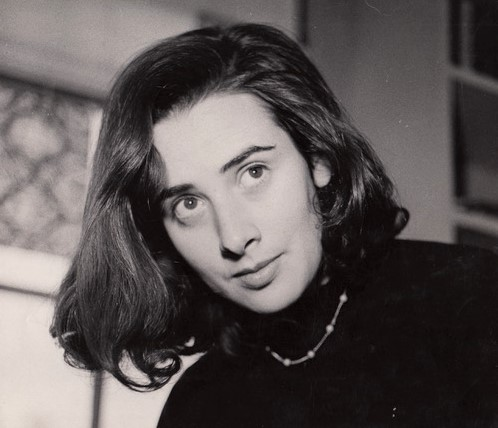
- Greenwald at Book Signing, 1962
- Born: Sheila Ellen Greenwald; May 26, 1934 (age 92); New York, New York, U.S.
- Education: Sarah Lawrence College
- Occupations: Writer, illustrator
- Spouse: Dr. George E. Green (m. 1960)
- Children: 2
- Writing career
- Period: 1956–present
- Genre: Children's books
- Notable work: Rosie Cole series
- Notable awards: Parents' Choice Award
- Website: sheilagreenwald.com

Sheila Greenwald (born May 26, 1934) is an American writer and illustrator of books for children and young adults. She is known best for Rosy Cole’s Great American Guilt Club (1985) and other Rosy Cole books, and has won awards including the Parents' Choice Award, and the Santa Monica Library's Green Prize for sustainable literature.

== Personal life ==
Greenwald was born on May 26, 1934, in New York City to parents Julius and Florence (née Friedman) Greenwald, and grew up on the Upper West Side of Manhattan. A Gale biographical entry lists Greenwald's religion as Jewish. She graduated from the High School of Music & Art as an art major and from Sarah Lawrence College as a literature major.

Greenwald is married to George E. Green, a cardiac surgeon, and has two children, Ben and Sam.

== Career ==
Greenwald is a writer and illustrator of children's picture books, books for young readers, young adult books, and magazine articles. She has written and illustrated 30 books of her own which received positive reviews, as well as illustrating for magazines. She began her career as an illustrator in 1956 and her writing career in 1962 with, A Metropolitan Love Story. In 1971, with the encouragement of her editor, she began writing books that she had once only illustrated. In an article written by Greenwald for Publishers Weekly in 2018, she wrote, "The Rosy Cole books", edited by Melanie Kroupa, "not only gave me the opportunity to create humor and character by juxtaposing text with illustrations, but allowed me to vent opinions on competition, sexual precocity, materialism, conformity to peer pressure, and more".

Greenwald has created illustrations for over seventy books for both adults and children written by others, among them the classic, The Pink Motel, by Carol Ryrie Brink. In the July, 1966 issue of Harper's Magazine she wrote, My Life Story, as well as illustrating additional articles, which were not her own. All of her published work has been written and illustrated by Greenwald with the exception of two, Bossy Flossie, books which were illustrated by Pierre Collet-Derby.

Her work for children, both text and illustration has been donated to the De Grummond Children’s Literature Collection at the McCain Library and Archives at The University of Southern Mississippi. Greenwald wrote, A Day With the Knights: A Real Imaginary Adventure, for the Metropolitan Museum of Art and has contributed to Cricket Magazine, The New York Times, Gourmet Magazine, and The Reporter Magazine.

== Books ==
This is a complete list of books written by Greenwald.

- 1960 - A Metropolitan Love Story
- 1971 - Willie Bryant and The Flying Otis
- 1972 - The Hot Day
- 1972 - Amanda Snap
- 1972 - Mat Pit And The Tunnel Tenants
- 1974 - The Secret Museum
- 1977 - The Secret In Miranda’s Closet
- 1977 - The Mariah Delany Lending Library Disaster
- 1978 - The Atrocious Two
- 1978 - All the Way To Wits End
- 1980 - It All Began With Jane Eyre
- 1981 - Give Us A Great Big Smile Rosy Cole An ALA notable book
- 1982 - Blissful Joy And The SAT’s Atlantic Monthly Press
- 1983 - Will the Real Gertrude Hollings Please Stand Up
- 1984 - Valentine Rosy Atlantic Monthly Press
- 1985 - Rosy Cole’s Great American Guilt Club Parent's Choice Selection 1985
- 1987 - Alvin Webster’s Surefire Plan For Success And How It Failed
- 1988 - Write On Rosy
- 1989 - Rosy’s Romance
- 1990 - Mariah Delany’s Author Of the Month Club
- 1991 - Here's Hermione
- 1992 - Rosy Cole Discovers America
- 1993 - My Fabulous New Life
- 1994 - Rosy Cole, She Walks In Beauty
- 1997 - Rosy Cole, She Grows and Graduates -
- 2000 - Stucksville
- 2003 - Rosy Cole’s Worst Ever Best Yet Tour Of New York City
- 2006 - Rosy Cole’s Memoir Explosion, A Heartbreaking Story about Losing Friends, Annoying Family, and Ruining Romance
- 2010 - Watch Out World Rosy Cole Is Going Green
- 2017 - Bossy Flossie Biz Whiz
- 2017 - Bossy Flossie, The Secret To Success #2

== Awards ==
- 1981 - American Library Association - Notable Children's Book - Give Us a Great Big Smile, Rosy Cole
- 1983 - Junior Library Guild Selection - Will the Real Gertrude Hollings Please Stand Up?
- 1985 - Parents' Choice Award - Rosy Cole's Great American Guilt Club
- 1987 - New York Public Library "One of 100 Best Books for Children" - Alvin Webster's Surefire Plan for Success
- 1989 - Junior Library Guild Selection - Rosy's Romance
- 1990 - Junior Library Guild Selection - Mariah Delany's Author-of-the-Month Club
- 1997 - Junior Library Guild Selection - Rosy Cole: She Grows and Graduates
- 2003 - Junior Library Guild Selection - Rosy Cole's Worst Ever Best Yet Tour of New York City
- 2006 - Junior Library Guild Selection - Rosy Cole's Memoir Explosion, a Heartbreaking Story About Losing Friends, Annoying Family, and Ruining Romance
- 2007 - Bank Street College of Education - "One of the Ten Best Children's Books of the Year" - Rosy Cole's Memoir Explosion, a Heartbreaking Story About Losing Friends, Annoying Family, and Ruining Romance
- 2011 - The Santa Monica Library Green Prize For Sustainable Literature - Watch out World, Rosy Cole is Going Green (re-released by National Geographic Learning, August 2015)
