= David Margesson, 1st Viscount Margesson =

British politician (1890–1965)

The Right Honourable The Viscount Margesson PC
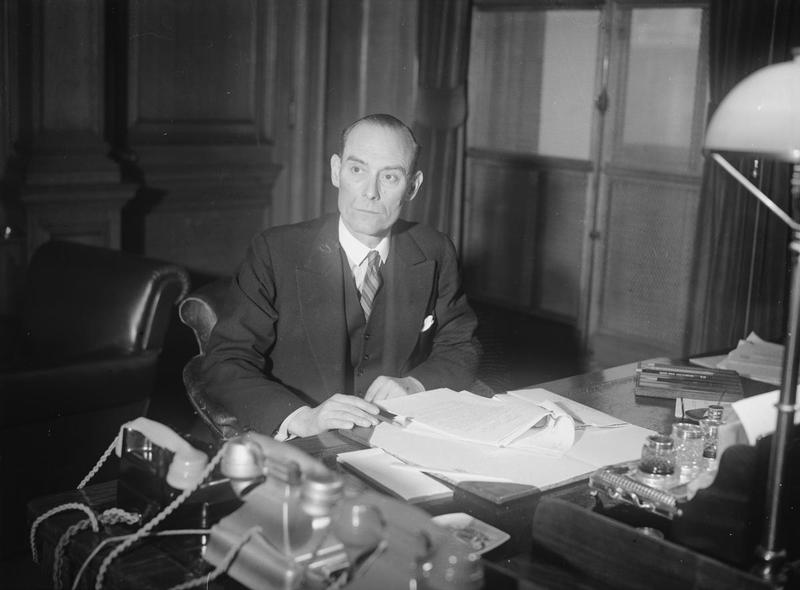
- Margesson at his desk in the War Office

Secretary of State for War
- In office 22 December 1940 – 22 February 1942
- Prime Minister: Winston Churchill
- Preceded by: Anthony Eden
- Succeeded by: Sir James Grigg

Government Chief Whip in the House of Commons Parliamentary Secretary to the Treasury
- In office 10 November 1931 – 22 December 1940
- Prime Minister: Ramsay MacDonald; Stanley Baldwin; Neville Chamberlain; Winston Churchill
- Preceded by: Tom Kennedy
- Succeeded by: Sir Charles Edwards

Personal details
- Born: 26 July 1890
- Died: 24 December 1965 (aged 75)
- Party: Conservative
- Spouse: Frances Leggett
- Education: Magdalene College, Cambridge

Henry David Reginald Margesson, 1st Viscount Margesson, PC (26 July 1890 – 24 December 1965) was a British Conservative politician, most popularly remembered for his tenure as Government Chief Whip in the 1930s.

His reputation was of a stern disciplinarian who was one of the harshest and most effective whips. His sense of the popular mood let him know when to sacrifice unpopular ministers. He protected the appeasement-supporting government as long as he could. It has been argued that the number of high-profile rebellions during his tenure points to the existence of weaknesses in his system.

== Background and education ==
Margesson was the third child and elder son of Sir Mortimer Margesson and Lady Isabel, daughter of Frederick Hobart-Hampden, Lord Hobart, and sister of the 7th Earl of Buckinghamshire. He grew up in Worcestershire and was educated at Harrow School and Magdalene College, Cambridge. He did not complete his degree, choosing instead to seek his fortune in the United States of America. Margesson volunteered at the outbreak of the First World War in 1914 and served as an adjutant in the 11th Hussars.

== Early political career, 1922–1931 ==
After the war, Margesson entered politics at the suggestion of Lord Lee of Fareham. In the 1922 general election, he was elected as Member of Parliament (MP) for Upton.

Very soon after his election, he was appointed Parliamentary Private Secretary to the Minister of Labour, Anderson Montague-Barlow. In the 1923 general election, he lost his seat, but at the 1924 general election, he returned to Parliament for Rugby, the seat for which he would sit for the next eighteen years. He defeated future Liberal National leader Ernest Brown in the process.

Margesson was appointed Assistant Government Whip. Two years later, he became a more senior whip with the title Junior Lord of the Treasury until the Conservatives' defeat, in the 1929 general election. In August 1931, he was reappointed to the same position upon the formation of the National Government.

== Government Chief Whip, 1931–1940 ==
Following the November 1931 general election, he was promoted to the senior position of Parliamentary Secretary to the Treasury (Government Chief Whip). Margesson's position was in many ways unprecedented, having the task of keeping in power a grouping composed of the Conservatives, National Labour and two groups of Liberals (the official Liberal Party and the Liberal National Party) all behind a single government that sought to stand above partisan politics. With the government commanding the support of 556 MPs, as opposed to just 58 opposition members, his main task was to ensure that the government stayed together and was able to pass contentious legislation without risking a major breach within the government.

That proved tricky several times, as different sections of the National combination came to denounce areas of government policy. Margesson adopted a method of strong disciplinarianism combined with selective use of patronage and the social effect of ostracism to secure every vote possible. An example of his methods was his letter to the House of Commons' youngest member, the future minister John Profumo, after the Norway Debate, in which Profumo had opposed other Conservatives. Margesson's letter included the following extraordinary passage: "And I can tell you this, you utterly contemptible little shit. On every morning that you wake up for the rest of your life you will be ashamed of what you did last night." On that occasion, his methods failed.

Despite such behaviour, Margesson remained a much-liked individual, with many members expressing personal admiration for him. Away from his duties he was known to be quite sociable, and within the parliamentary party; few bore him ill. However, a major faultline lay over the question of introducing protective tariffs on imports as a prelude to negotiating a customs union within the British Empire. The proposed policy had deeply divided the Conservatives over the previous 30 years, but by then, they, with most of the National Labour and Liberal National members of the government, had become in favour of the policy during the Great Depression.

However the Liberal Party remained committed to the principle of free trade and were deeply reluctant to compromise. Whilst the Liberals themselves barely commanded the support of 33 MPs, they were one of only two parties in the government with a long independent history, and there were fears that their withdrawal would turn the National Government into a mere Conservative rump, something that National Labour Prime Minister Ramsay MacDonald wished to avoid.

At one stage, it was agreed that members of the cabinet would suspend the principle of cabinet collective responsibility and agree to differ on tariffs.

Matters were complicated again by the question of Cabinet appointments. When the Liberal President of the Board of Education Sir Donald Maclean died, Margesson insisted that to appoint another Liberal, merely on the basis of party balance, would inflame tensions in Conservative MPs, could lead to a poor appointment and would maintain an imbalance, the Liberals having one more Cabinet minister than the Liberal Nationals did despite the latter having two more MPs. National Labour Lord Privy Seal Lord Snowden was increasingly siding with the Liberals on all key divisions, thus providing a surrogate. The appointment of the Conservative Lord Irwin upset the Liberals, who had no promise that the next Cabinet vacancy would be filled by a Liberal.

In the summer of 1932, the Ottawa Agreement was negotiated between the dominions, and free trade seemed a dead cause within government. In September, the Liberals resigned their ministerial offices but did not withdraw complete support for the government until the following November. However the National Government did not break up, as the remaining National Labour and Liberal National elements remained in government.

In 1933, Margesson was sworn of the Privy Council.

In 1935, the Government came under fire from the Diehard Conservative wing of the Conservative Party over plans to implement the Government of India Act 1935, which would grant India more autonomy. The policy was widely felt to be a hangover from the previous Labour government and one that few Conservative governments would have implemented. Many believed that the plan would not have been pursued except for both a desire to prove the government's nonpartisan credentials and Conservative leader Stanley Baldwin's determination to implement the policy. For some, the question of the success of the policy became a question of the survival of the National Government. Opponents to Indian Home Rule found several spokespersons, most notably Winston Churchill, and they harried the government at every stage, with nearly one hundred Conservative MPs voting against the third reading of the Bill, the highest number of Conservatives to vote against a three-line whip in the twentieth century. Still, the Bill passed easily.

Margesson was retained as Chief Whip when Baldwin became Prime Minister in June 1935 but had to face further rifts in the party over foreign policy and other matters. The government's majority was cut to 250 in the November 1935 general election. In December, the leaking of the proposed Hoare-Laval Plan to grant two-thirds of Abyssinia to Italy outraged some Conservative MPs. Margesson's reading of the mood led to the Foreign Secretary Samuel Hoare being dropped from the government to soothe feelings and keep the government in power.

The late 1930s were a turbulent time within the National Government, with rebellions over foreign policy, over unemployment, over agriculture and other matters routinely threatened to rock the government. Margesson was instrumental in heading off many of the rebellions and limiting damage caused by others. He was instrumental in warding these off for Baldwin and then Neville Chamberlain. However, a well of discontent with the government's foreign policy grew, especially after Britain entered World War II. Eight months into the conflict, severe reverses in the Norwegian campaign led to the two-day "Norway Debate" of 7 and 8 May 1940 in which the government came under severe criticism from its own supporters and witnessed a massive rebellion on a motion of confidence. The government maintained a majority, but Margesson's soundings revealed that that majority was imperilled unless the political composition of the government was widened. When Chamberlain realised that he was unable to do so, he resigned and was succeeded by Churchill.

Margesson was referred to in the book "Guilty Men" by Michael Foot, Frank Owen and Peter Howard (writing under the pseudonym "Cato"), published in 1940 as an attack on public figures for their failure to re-arm and their appeasement of Nazi Germany.

== Secretary of State for War, 1940–1942 ==
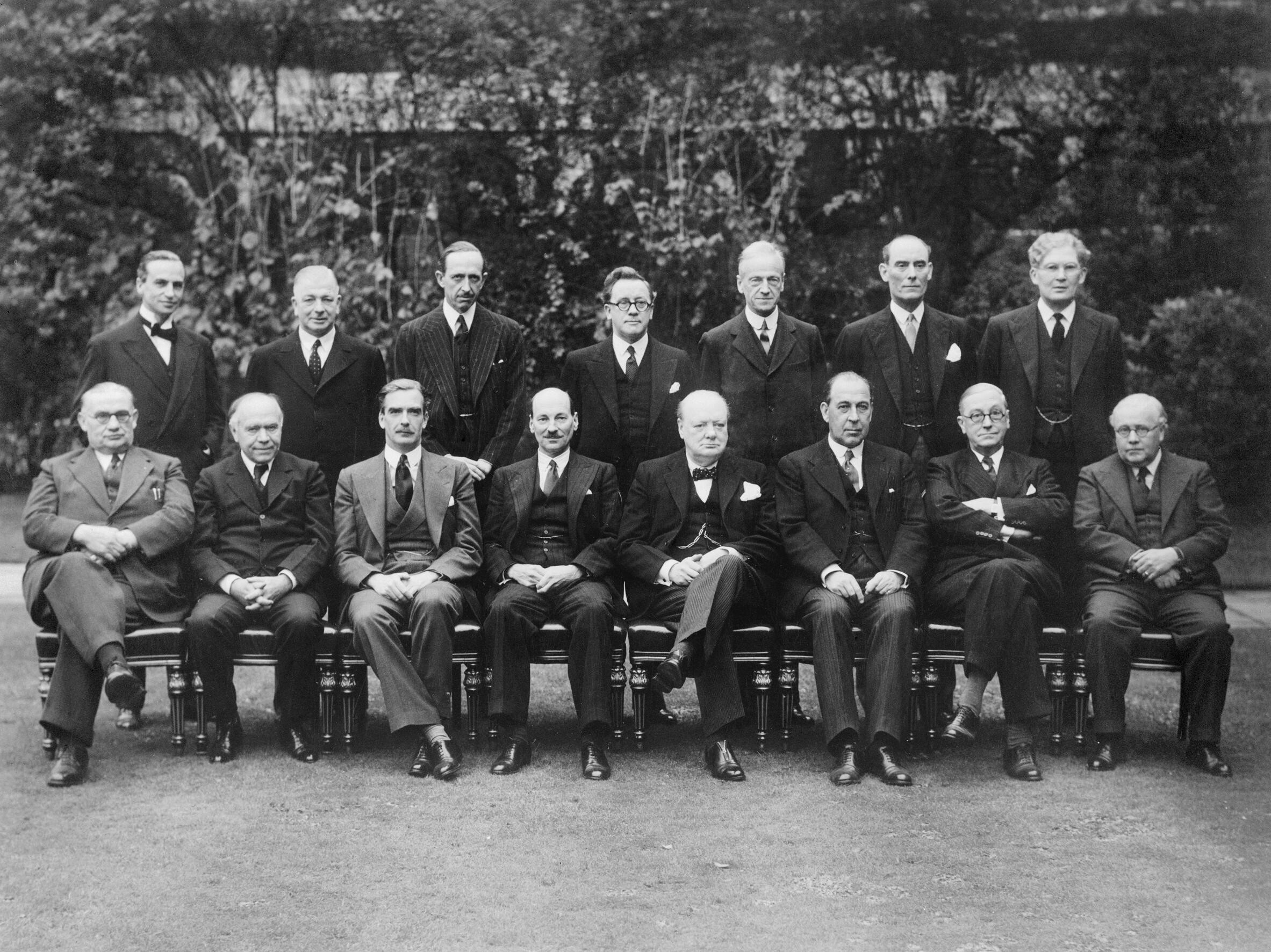
Margesson (standing, second from right) with other members of the Churchill Coalition War Cabinet

Many were surprised that Churchill retained Margesson as Chief Whip, little realising that there was no personal animosity between the two and that Churchill would have had less regard for Margesson if he had not carried out his functions as Chief Whip. Margesson proved a useful buttress of support as Churchill consolidated his position in government.

Margesson, who was living at the Carlton Club since his recent divorce, was present when it was bombed by the Luftwaffe on 14 October 1940. He was left homeless and had to sleep for a time on a makeshift bed in the underground Cabinet Annexe.

When, at the end of 1940, the position of Secretary of State for War fell vacant, Margesson was promoted to it. Margesson proved competent and efficient, but in February 1942, Britain suffered severe military setbacks, including the loss of Singapore. Churchill was forced to make changes to his ministerial team and find scapegoats for the disasters. Margesson was dropped and replaced by his own Permanent Under-Secretary P. J. Grigg, an unprecedented move. Margesson was first told of the change by Grigg himself but accepted his fate as necessary for the government's future. Later that year, he was made Viscount Margesson, of Rugby in the County of Warwick. His political influence waned sharply. He subsequently worked in the City of London.

== Family ==
Margesson married Frances, the half-sister of Alberta Montagu, Countess of Sandwich and daughter of Francis Howard Leggett and Betty Leggett, in 1916. They had one son and two daughters but were divorced in 1940. Their second daughter, the Hon. Mary, married Lord Charteris of Amisfield. Lord Margesson died in the Bahamas in December 1965, aged 75, and was succeeded in the viscountcy by his only son, Francis.

== Arms ==
Coat of arms of David Margesson, 1st Viscount Margesson
Crest Upon a coronet composed of four roses set upon a rim Or a lion passant guardant Sable collared Gold and charged with a rose Argent barbed and seeded Proper. Escutcheon Sable a lion passant guardant Argent a chief engrailed Or thereon between two pallets Azure a pale of the last charged with an ostrich feather erect of the second. Supporters On either side a falcon wings elevated Argent armed and belled Or and charged with a portcullis chained Sable. Motto Loyaute Me Lie

== Book ==
- Stewart, Graham (2000). Burying Caesar: Churchill, Chamberlain and the Battle for the Tory Party. London: Phoenix. ISBN 978-0-75381-060-6.

Parliament of the United Kingdom
Preceded by Sir Ernest Wild	Member of Parliament for Upton; 1922–1923	Succeeded by Benjamin Gardiner
Preceded by Ernest Brown	Member of Parliament for Rugby; 1924–1942	Succeeded by William Brown
Political offices
Preceded by Tom Kennedy	Parliamentary Secretary to the Treasury; 1931–1940	Succeeded by Sir Charles Edwards
Preceded by Anthony Eden	Secretary of State for War; 1940–1942	Succeeded by Sir P. J. Grigg
Peerage of the United Kingdom
New title	Viscount Margesson; 1942–1965	Succeeded by Francis Margesson
