= Ken Thomas (trade unionist) =

British trade unionist

Kenneth Rowland Thomas OBE (7 February 1927 – 12 August 2008) was a Welsh trade unionist and General Secretary of the Civil and Public Services Association (CPSA).

== Early life ==
Thomas was born in Penarth, Glamorgan. His father died when he was a boy, and he was brought up by his mother and two sisters. After Penarth Grammar School, he worked briefly as a trainee journalist for the South Wales Echo and Western Mail from 1943 to 1944.

== Civil Service career ==
Thomas joined the Civil Service in 1944. He became an assistant secretary of the CPSA from 1955 until 1967, Deputy General Secretary from 1967 and was appointed General Secretary of the union in 1976, a post from which he retired in 1982, asking for a composition by Welsh composer Daniel Jones. He was also a member of the TUC General Council from 1977 to 1982.

== Retirement ==
In retirement Thomas sat on various boards and committees including Occupational Pensions Board (1981–1997); the Civil Service Appeal Board (1984–91); the Law Society Professional Purposes Committee (1984–86); and the Solicitors' Complaints Bureau (1986–92). He was also a trustee of the Post Office Pension Fund (1969–84), the London Development Capital Fund (1984–99) and the British Telecommunications Fund (1983–97) as well being a director of the West Midlands Enterprise Board from 1982, the Warwickshire Venture Capital Fund (1988–91) and the West Midlands Growth Fund (1990–2005).

He was appointed an OBE in 1995.

Trade union offices
Preceded by Bill Kendall	General Secretary of the Civil and Public Services Association; 1976–1982	Succeeded by Alistair Graham
