= Association of Government Supervisors and Radio Officers =

The Association of Government Supervisors and Radio Officers (AGSRO) was a trade union representing supervisors in the British civil service.

The union was founded in 1955, when the Association of Government Foremen and Technical Supervisors merged with the Civil Service Radio Officers' Association. Over time, several other small unions merged into it, bringing into membership a wide variety of technical supervisors and some other workers, such as accountants. By the end of the 1970s, it had a membership of 12,000, and was active on the Civil Service Whitley Council, but did not join the Trades Union Congress as it was concerned that could be seen as a political act.

In 1980, the union was a founder member of the Council of Civil Service Unions, receiving two seats on its council. In 1984, it merged into the Institution of Professional Civil Servants.
