= Council of Civil Service Unions =

United Kingdom trade union federation

The Council of Civil Service Unions (CCSU) was a trade union federation in the United Kingdom.

The federation's origins lay in the Civil Service National Whitley Council, a joint bargaining organisation consisting of trade unions and representatives of the civil service as an employer. By the 1970s, most unions were unsatisfied with the arrangement, feeling that the trade union members of the council were unrepresentative, and that it was an overly bureaucratic system. As a result, in 1980, they formed the independent Council of Civil Service Unions.

The founding members of the federation, with the number of seats they initially held, were:

- Association of First Division Civil Servants (2 associate members)
- Association of Government Supervisors and Radio Officers (2)
- Association of Her Majesty's Inspectors of Taxes (2 associate members)
- Civil and Public Services Association (20)
- Civil Service Union (6)
- Inland Revenue Staff Federation (8)
- Institution of Professional Civil Servants (11)
- Prison Officers' Association (3)
- Society of Civil and Public Servants (11)

The council led a campaign against the government's prohibition of staff at the Government Communications Headquarters from joining a trade union. This landmark case, Council of Civil Service Unions v Minister for the Civil Service, was ultimately lost in the House of Lords.

Over the years, many of the civil service unions merged and, in 1998, the Public and Commercial Services Union (PCS) was formed, representing for the first time a majority of civil service trade unionists. With many of the council's functions having been delegated to other bodies, it agreed thereafter to proceed only on the basis of consensus among all members. By 2010, the following unions held membership of the council:

- FDA
- Northern Ireland Public Service Alliance
- Prison Officers' Association
- Prospect
- Public and Commercial Services Union

The consensus-based approach led to dissatisfaction, the PCS complaining that decisions were subject to the veto of even very small unions. The FDA, meanwhile, opposed the PCS's specific recommendations for change, arguing that this would effectively give the PCS the final say on all civil service matters. In 2010, unable to agree a way forward for the federation, it was dissolved.

== General Secretaries ==
1980: Bill Kendall
1983: Peter Jones
1992: John Ellis
1995: Charles Cochrane
