= George Greene (traveller) =

George Greene (fl. 1813), was a traveller, land-steward and writer, born in 1747 or 1748.

In 1787 a decree in the court of chancery deprived him of the greater part of his fortune. Unable to find employment at home, he became at Easter 1790, on the recommendation of Lord Adam Gordon, land-steward to the Prince of Monaco on his estate at Torigny in Lower Normandy. From 14 October 1793 until 24 January 1795 he was imprisoned by the French revolutionary leaders, with his wife Isabella and his five children, in the castle at Torigny.

The Duke of Valentinois, the son and successor of the Prince of Monaco, after being restored to his castle and such part of his estates as remained unsold, appointed Greene his land-steward in February 1796. The coup d'état of 4 September 1797 again threw him out of employment. In 1798, he went to Paris, and tried in vain to obtain passports for England. He returned to Torigny, where he was again arrested on 14 July 1798, and imprisoned in the citadel of St. Lo until December 1799. In February 1800, he was allowed to return to England. To relieve his financial distress, he published by subscription 'A Relation of several Circumstances which occurred in the Province of Lower Normandy during the Revolution, and under the Governments of Robespierre and the Directory; commencing in 1789 down to 1800. With a detail of the Confinement and Sufferings of the Author; together with an Account of the Manners and Rural Customs of the Inhabitants of that part of the Country called the Bocage, in Lower Normandy,’ 8vo, London, 1802.

Greene afterwards resided in Russia, and wrote a 'Journal from London to St. Petersburg by way of Sweden,’ 12mo, London, 1813. He is mentioned as still alive in the 'Biographical Dictionary of Living Authors,’ 1816.
