= George Green (baseball) =

American baseball player

- Outfielder
- Born: 1884; Maryland, U.S.
- Died: Unknown

Negro league baseball debut
- 1919, for the Brooklyn Royal Giants

Last appearance
- 1920, for the Brooklyn Royal Giants

Teams
- Brooklyn Royal Giants (1919–1920)

George M. Green (1884 – death date unknown) was an American Negro league outfielder between 1919 and 1920.

A native of Maryland, Green played for the Brooklyn Royal Giants in 1919 and 1920. In 13 recorded games, he posted eight hits and two RBI in 49 plate appearances.
