= Clive Brooke, Baron Brooke of Alverthorpe =

British trade unionist and Labour Member of the House of Lords

The Right Honourable The Lord Brooke of Alverthorpe
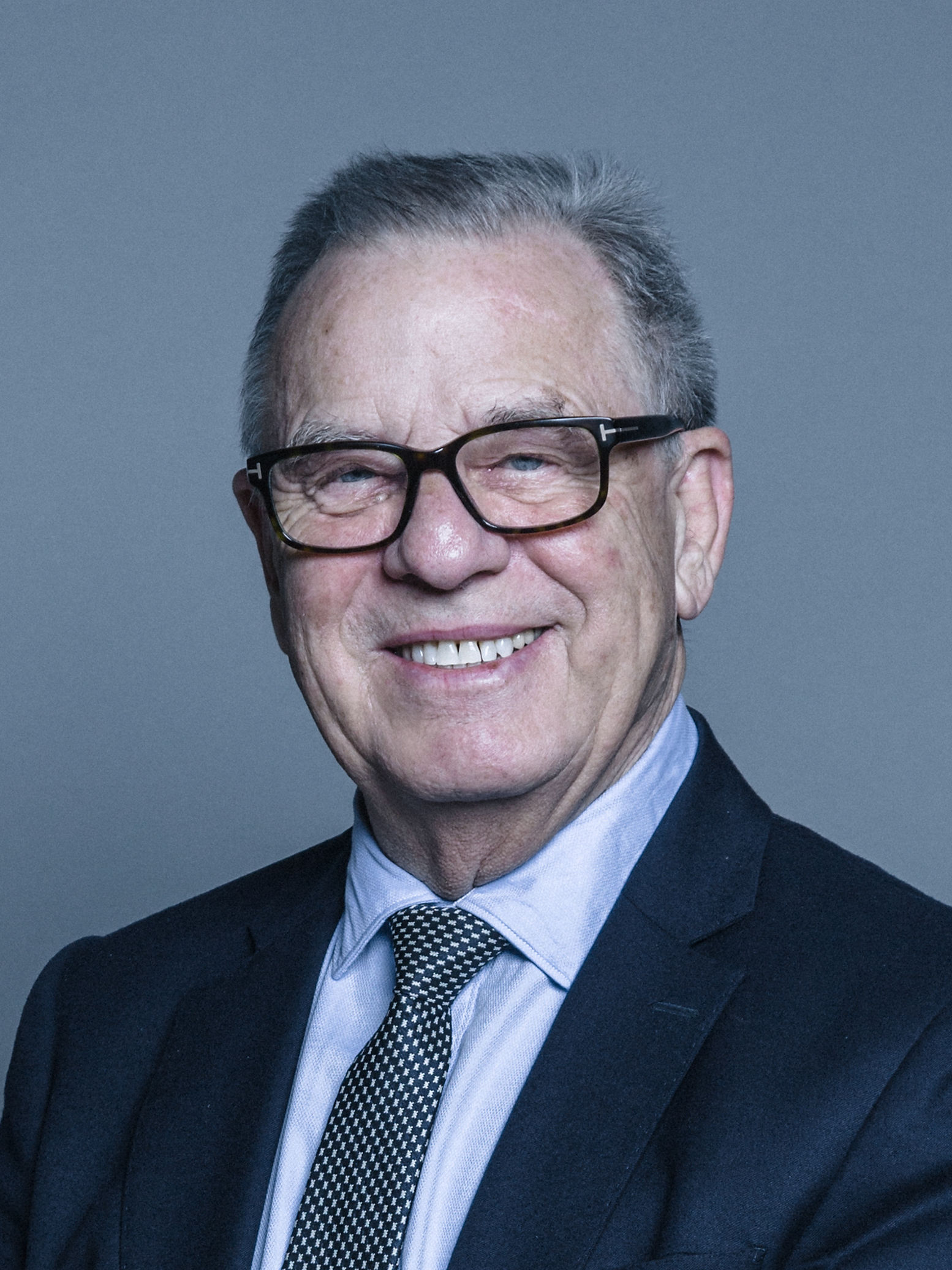
- Official Portrait of Lord Brooke of Alverthorpe

Member of the House of Lords
- Lord Temporal
- Life peerage 23 October 1997

Personal details
- Born: Clive Brooke; 21 June 1942 (age 84)
- Party: Labour
- Spouse: Lorna Hopkin Roberts
- Education: Thornes House School

Clive Brooke, Baron Brooke of Alverthorpe (born 21 June 1942) is a British trade unionist, and Labour Member of the House of Lords.

The son of John Brooke and Mary Colbeck, Brooke was educated in Thornes House School, Wakefield. From 1964 to 1982, he worked as Assistant Secretary of the Inland Revenue Staff Federation, from 1982 to 1988 as Deputy General Secretary and as General Secretary from 1988 to 1995. In 1996 Brooke became Joint General Secretary of Public Services Tax and Commerce Union and held this post until 1998. He was Member of the General Council of the Trades Union Congress (TUC) between 1989 and 1996 and between 1993 and 1996 of the TUC Executive Committee. Brooke is a Member of the Public and Commercial Services Union (PCS), the successor to the civil service union he led.

On 23 October 1997, he was created a life peer as Baron Brooke of Alverthorpe, of Alverthorpe in the County of West Yorkshire. He sits on the Labour benches. In the same year he became Trustee of the Institute for Public Policy Research. He has been a trustee and Council member of Community Service Volunteers (CSV) and is a trustee of Action on Addiction. He served as a non-executive director of NATS (formerly National Air Traffic Services) from 2001 until 2006. In 2020 he became the Patron of Sugarwise.

Lord Brooke of Alverthorpe has been married to Lorna Hopkin Roberts since 1967.

== Arms ==
Coat of arms of Clive Brooke, Baron Brooke of Alverthorpe
Notes Baron since 1997 Adopted 15 September 2016 Crest Upon a Helm with a wreath Argent Or and Vert Issuant from a Circlet of Tally Sticks erect Or a demi Badger proper gorged with a Collar Or charged with a Barrulet wavy Azure supporting with the dexter forepaw a Palmer's Staff Argent pendant therefrom a Scrip Gules fimbriated and charged with a Roundel Or on the Roundel a Triangle throughout Gules Torse Mantling Or and Vert. Escutcheon Vert a Pall wavy bendwise Argent charged with another wavy Azure in dexter chief a Fleur-de-lys bendwise Or fimbriated Ermine Supporters On either side a Barn Owl guardant proper perched on a Patriarchal Cross Gules. Motto One step at a time

Political offices
Preceded by Tony Christopher	General Secretary of the Inland Revenue Staff Federation; 1988–1996	Position abolished
New post	General Secretary of the Public Services, Tax and Commerce Union; 1996–1998; With: John Sheldon	Position abolished
Orders of precedence in the United Kingdom
Preceded by The Lord Razzall	Gentlemen; Baron Brooke of Alverthorpe	Followed by The Lord Dholakia
