= Viscount Margesson =

Viscountcy in the Peerage of the United Kingdom

Viscount Margesson, of Rugby in the County of Warwick, is a title in the Peerage of the United Kingdom. It was created on 27 April 1942 for the Conservative politician David Margesson. As of 2015 the title is held by his grandson, the third Viscount, who succeeded in 2014.

== Viscounts Margesson (1942) ==
- (Henry) David Reginald Margesson, 1st Viscount Margesson (1890–1965)
- Francis Vere Hampden Margesson, 2nd Viscount Margesson (1922–2014)
- Richard Francis David Margesson, 3rd Viscount Margesson (b. 1960)

There is no heir to the viscountcy.

Coat of arms of Viscount Margesson
Crest Upon a coronet composed of four roses set upon a rim Or a lion passant guardant Sable collared Gold and charged with a rose Argent barbed and seeded Proper. Escutcheon Sable a lion passant guardant Argent a chief engrailed Or thereon between two pallets Azure a pale of the last charged with an ostrich feather erect of the second. Supporters On either side a falcon wings elevated Argent armed and belled Or and charged with a portcullis chained Sable. Motto Loyaute Me Lie
