= George E. Green (doctor) =

American cardiac surgeon (born 1932)

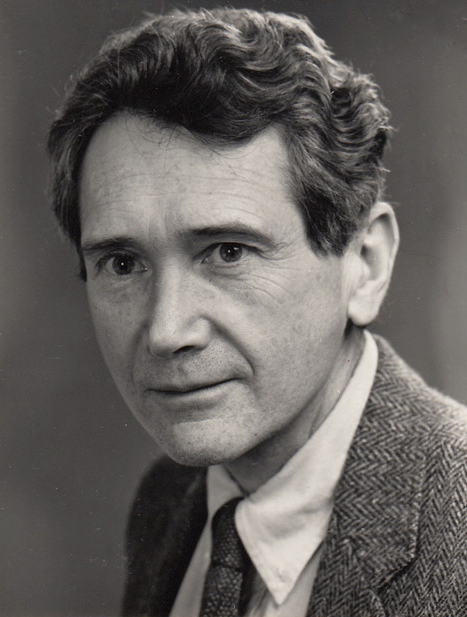
- Green in 1964
- Born: George Edward Green; 18 January 1932 (age 94); Brooklyn, New York, U.S.
- Education: Yale College, Yale Medical School
- Occupations: Cardiac surgeon, author
- Board member of: American Board of Thoracic Surgery
- Spouse: Sheila Greenwald Green (m. 1960)

George E. Green is an American cardiac surgeon best known for pioneering and implementing the first surgical procedure of the left coronary artery bypass graft using the internal thoracic artery sutured to the left anterior descending coronary artery to bypass obstruction to the heart circulation in the late 1960s. He applied these techniques in 1968 at New York University Medical Center. In 1970 he was hired to establish St. Luke's Hospital's (now Mount Sinai Morningside) cardiac surgery program in Manhattan, New York, which by 1982 was seeing approximately 1,800 cases a year, the biggest program in the state. Green has lectured internationally on the topic, and has written numerous reports on internal thoracic artery grafting, as well as co-authoring Surgical Revascularization of the Heart: The Internal Thoracic Arteries.

== Early life ==
George E. Green was born on January 18, 1932, and raised in Brooklyn, New York, where he attended grade school and high school. He attended Yale College and graduated from Yale School of Medicine, then returned to New York to intern at Bellevue Hospital and complete a residency at Saint Vincent's Hospital and the Veterans Administration Hospital. From 1962 to 1964 he served as a surgeon on United States Navy Reserve active duty at U.S. Naval Hospital in Camp Pendleton, California. He also completed a residency in thoracic and cardiovascular surgery from 1966 to 1968 at New York University Medical Center.

== Career ==
Green was the first cardiac surgeon to successfully perform a left coronary artery bypass graft using the internal thoracic artery sutured to the left anterior descending coronary artery to bypass obstruction to the heart, in 1968. At the time, many experts believed that the internal mammary artery was too small to splice into the coronary arteries. The bypass called for 20 stitches to attach the vessel. "Many years ago George Green stood alone in support of the internal mammary artery as a superior conduit," Dr. John L. Ochsner of the Ochsner Clinic in New Orleans had written. "In the years since, many of us have joined his ranks."

Green began working with microsurgery techniques while working as an assistant with Max Som at Beth Israel Medical Hospital Center. Som was looking for a better solution to the reconstruction of the esophagus post-cancer treatment. In order to improve on the technique, Green introduced himself to Julius H. Jacobson, who had newly arrived at the Mount Sinai Medical Center, and was the first American to publish about using a surgical microscope to anastomose the smallest blood vessels. Green was given access to Jacobson's lab and practiced the same procedure.

In an excerpt from Green's "After 50 years, a personal reflection on the development of internal thoracic artery (ITA) grafting", he reported that, "Although the procedure had been prohibited at the New York University Hospital, David Tice, Director of Surgery at the affiliated New York Veterans Administration Hospital, invited me to do it there. I did the first internal thoracic artery (ITA)-left anterior descending (LAD) artery anastomosis in the United States there in February of 1968."

In 1968 Green was a spokesman for the research team at the New York University of Medicine at the annual Clinical Congress of American College of Surgeons, sharing the outcomes of 12 patients on whom he had performed the surgery. In 1971 he documented his research and work on "coronary artery bypass grafts for congestive heart failure; a report of experiences with 40 patients" in The Journal of Thoracic and Cardiovascular Surgery (supported in part by a grant from the National Heart and Lung Institutes of the National Institutes of Health), which was read at the 51st Annual Meeting of The American Association for Thoracic Surgery, in Atlanta, Georgia in April 1971. In 1972, at the Coronary Artery Surgery Clifton Symposium, Williams Glenn, chief of surgery at Yale School of Medicine, spoke against operating on the heart's arteries, while Green gave arguments for it. In 1973 Green spoke on the topic at the scientific sessions at the American Heart Association, Pennsylvania Affiliate. Green served as president of the International Symposium Internal Thoracic Artery for Myocardial Revascularization in the early 1990s, and has lectured in France, Sweden, Norway, Germany, Greece, England, and Argentina, among others.

== Personal life ==
Green is married to children's book author Sheila Greenwald. They have two sons.
