= Civil Service Alliance =

UK trade union federation

- Founded: 1939
- Dissolved: 1974
- Location: United Kingdom

The Civil Service Alliance was a trade union federation bringing together civil servants in the United Kingdom.

== Predecessors ==
The organisation's origins lay in the Civil Service Federation, established by nine unions in 1911. By the following year, it represented 102,000 civil servants. It focused on giving evidence to government commissions and discussing the possibility of political action. The unions representing clerical workers objected to this focus, and in 1916 all except the post office clerks' unions left the federation.

In 1917, the Assistant Clerks' Association, Civil Service Typists' Association, Federation of Women Civil Servants and Second Division Clerks' Association established a new Civil Service Alliance. The Association of Superintendents and Deputy Superintendents of the Board of Trade Mercantile Marine Offices, Association of Tax Clerks and Boy Clerks' Association also joined before the end of the year, and by 1920 the alliance had 28 full members, 7 associate members, and also affiliations from the Irish Civil Service Association, Isle of Man Civil Service Association and Jamaica Civil Service Association. All the unions were small, and together they represented only 26,253 members. However, the alliance was able to employ a full-time general secretary, Hugh Shayler.

Meanwhile, the Civil Service Federation was struggling. In 1919, the post office clerks' unions had formed the Union of Post Office Workers, which did not affiliate to the federation. At the start of 1921, it agreed to merge with the Alliance, to form a new Civil Service Confederation, with Shayler as its leader. Initially, this represented 87 unions, with a total membership of 66,209. Many were members of the Civil Service Clerical Association (CSCA), which became increasingly unhappy that it could be outvoted by a combination of smaller unions. As a result, it withdrew in 1937, and the next largest affiliates, the Inland Revenue Staff Federation (IRSF) and Ministry of Labour Staff Association (MLSA), left the following year. Now short of members, the confederation dissolved in 1939.

== Civil Service Alliance ==
Despite having caused the downfall of the confederation, the CSCA and MLSA wished to form a replacement, in part to reduce conflict between themselves. In 1939, they worked with the County Court Officers' Association (CCOA) and the IRSF to establish a new Civil Service Alliance, initially led by Len White of the CSCA. This alliance proved far more enduring.

The MLSA merged into the CSCA in 1973, followed in 1974 by the CCOA. This led the alliance to dissolve itself.
