= George Green (1829 ship) =

History

United Kingdom
- Name: George Green
- Namesake: George Green (shipbuilder)
- Owner: Wigram & Green, London
- Builder: William Smith & Co, St Peter's, Newcastle-on-Tyne
- Launched: 26 December 1829
- Fate: Wrecked January 1830

General characteristics
- Tons burthen: 568, or 600 (bm)
- Length: 135 ft 0 in (41.1 m)
- Propulsion: Sail

George Green was wrecked on her maiden voyage. She had been launched on 26 December 1829 at Newcastle and was sailing to London to be delivered to her owners when she wrecked on 30 January. She ran aground on the Hasbro' Sands, Norfolk, and subsequently foundered. Her crew were saved. She was valued at £25,000 and insured for £20,500.

A list of ships trading with India under license from the British East India Company indicated that George Green, W.L. Pope, master, was expected to sail to Madras and Bengal.
