= Alistair Graham =

British trade unionist (born 1942)

Sir John Alistair Graham (born 6 August 1942) is a British trade unionist who was Chairman of the Committee on Standards in Public Life from 2003 until April 2007.

He was born in Northumberland, and was educated at the Royal Grammar School, Newcastle. He is a Fellow of the Chartered Institute of Personnel Development and the Institute of Training and Development. He has been a visiting Fellow of Nuffield College, Oxford (1984–1991). He has Honorary Doctorates from the Open University and from Bradford University. He was appointed (Knight Bachelor) in the 2000 New Year Honours for services to the Parades Commission for Northern Ireland.

Sir Alistair has had a long and varied career in public service. Between 1966 and 1986 he worked for the trade union, the Civil and Public Services Association (CPSA) as Assistant Secretary, Assistant General Secretary, Deputy General Secretary and, finally, General Secretary. His next post was as Chief Executive of the Industrial Society (now renamed The Work Foundation) between 1986 and 1991, after which he became Chief Executive of Calderdale and Kirklees Training and Enterprise Council (1991–1996), then of the Leeds Training and Enterprise Council (1996–2000). During this latter period he also served as Chairman of the Parades Commission for Northern Ireland (1997–2000). Between 2000 and 2004 he was Chairman of the Police Complaints Authority (later the Independent Police Complaints Commission). Between 2004 and 2007 he was Chairman of the Committee on Standards in Public Life.

In 2006 he became Chairman of ICSTIS (later PhonepayPlus), a regulatory body for premium rate phone-paid services.

Graham criticised Rishi Sunak appointing Suella Braverman as Home Secretary in 2022, Graham said “Normally the prime minister would have consulted a ministerial adviser for advice. A breach of the ministerial code is seen as a serious matter and would make any minister an inappropriate appointment to one of the four most senior positions in government.”

Trade union offices
| Preceded by Ken Thomas | General Secretary of the Civil and Public Services Association; 1982–1986 | Succeeded by John Ellis |
Government offices
| New creation | Chairman of the Parades Commission for Northern Ireland; 1997–2000 | Succeeded by Sir Anthony Holland |
| Preceded by Peter Moorhouse | Chairman of the Police Complaints Authority; 2000–2004 | Authority replaced with the IPCC |
| Preceded by Sir Nigel Wicks | Chairman of the Committee on Standards in Public Life; 2004 – 2007 | Succeeded by Sir Christopher Kelly KCB |
Police appointments
| New creation | Chairman of the British Transport Police Authority; 2004–2008 | Succeeded by Millie Banerjee |
