= Inland Revenue Staff Federation =

Former trade union of the United Kingdom

- Merged into: Public Services, Tax and Commerce Union
- Founded: 1936
- Dissolved: 1996
- Headquarters: 7 St George's Square, Pimlico, London, Douglas Houghton House, 231 Vauxhall Bridge Road, London
- Location: United Kingdom
- Members: 55,000 (1986)
- Publication: Assessment
- Affiliations: TUC, CCSU, CSA

The Inland Revenue Staff Federation (IRSF) was a trade union in the United Kingdom.

== History ==
The Union was born in the late 19th century, when a group of tax clerks met together to fight for higher pay, higher status and better conditions. At that time clerks were hired by surveyors of taxes, they were usually employed on a temporary basis, paid low wages and denied sick leave, holidays or promotion. Clerks who asked for better conditions were branded as agitators and sacked.

So it took courage when a group of clerks met on 8 January 1892 and agreed a draft constitution to set up the Association of Tax Clerks another of the Federation's parent unions.

The Federation was founded on 1 January 1936 with the merger of the Association of Officers of Taxes, the National Association of the Taxes Assessing and Collecting Services and the Valuation Office Clerical Association. Its Assistant Secretary from 1936 until World War II was future Prime Minister of the United Kingdom James Callaghan.

In 1937, the Federation, which represented taxes and collection staff, was joined by valuation staff. The roots of the Federation go back to 1883 and the founding of the London Association of Assessors and Collectors, but only after 1937 did it fully represent all staff grades at the Inland Revenue.

In 1938, the Inland Revenue Minor Establishments' Association joined the union. The union initially operated on a federal basis but, in 1939–40, it became a single organisation. These changes took place under the leadership of William Thomas Seddon.

At the 1986 Jubilee Celebration, the IRSF was described as a modern efficient organisation, with a high profile in the trade union movement, with a membership of 55,000.

In 1996, the IRSF merged with the National Union of Civil and Public Servants to form the Public Services, Tax and Commerce Union.

Only two people held presidency of the union twice, those being G B Walker and William Robert Roy Skinner. The first female president of the Federation was Winifred Mary Kidd in 1956.

== General Secretaries ==
- 1936: Douglas Houghton
- 1960: Cyril Plant
- 1976: Tony Christopher
- 1988: Clive Brooke

== Presidents ==
- 1936–1937 John Roughton Simpson
- 1937–1938 David Thomson
- 1938–1941 William Thomas Seddon
- 1941–1944 James Cyril Jagger
- 1944–1946 William Frederick Botterill Smith
- 1946–1949 Reginald George Cox
- 1949–1951 Gerald Benjamin Walker
- 1951–1953 Richard Henry LeFevere
- 1953–1955 William Robert Roy Skinner
- 1955–1957 Winifred Mary Kidd
- 1957–1958 Gerald Benjamin Walker
- 1958–1960 William Robert Roy Skinner
- 1960–1962 J. V. Boyle
- 1962–1964 G. W. Davies
- 1964–1966 J. G. C. Hopkins
- 1966–1968 W. G. Lloyd
- 1968–1970 J. Bibby
- 1970–1972 W. Wilson
- 1972–1974 D. L. Thomas
- 1974–1976 W. Bartlett
- 1976–1978 T. I. McKeon
- 1978–1980 S. C. Walters
- 1980–1982 T. T. Bagguley
- 1982–1984 C. H. Boote
- 1984–1986 C. Salt
- 1986 – F. R. Winrow
