= Society of Civil and Public Servants =

- Merged into: National Union of Civil and Public Servants
- Founded: 1918
- Dissolved: 1988
- Headquarters: 124-130 Southwark Street, London
- Location: United Kingdom
- Members: 46,000 (1963); 106,903 (1982)
- Publication: Opinion
- Affiliations: TUC, CCSU, NFPW, STUC

The Society of Civil and Public Servants (SCPS) was a trade union representing middle-ranking civil servants in the United Kingdom.

The union was founded in 1918 as the Society of Civil Servants (SCS), to represent intermediate class clerks. They became part of the executive class in 1920, but the union decided against merging with the Association of Executive Officers, operating in competition until 1930. In 1922, it founded the Institute of Public Administration.

The Association of Executive Officers merged into the Society of Public Servants in 1930. The merger left the union with 7,500 members, and this grew rapidly, to 24,000 by the end of World War II, and 46,000 in 1963, at which time more than 90% of eligible workers were members.

The union merged with the Customs and Excise Group and Association of Officers of the Ministry of Labour in 1975, and the following year, it adopted its final name. By this period, in addition to the civil service, it had members in the Post Office and the UK Atomic Energy Authority.

In 1988, the society merged with the Civil Service Union to form the National Union of Civil and Public Servants.

== General Secretaries ==
1930: Albert James Taylor Day
1946:
1948: Edward Redhead
1956: Leslie Williams
1966: John Dryden
1973: Gerry Gillman
1985: Leslie Christie
