= George Green (trade unionist) =

British trade union leader

George Frederick Green (3 August 1908 – 7 October 1989) was a British trade union leader.

Green was born in London Borough of Camden to George James Green and Florence Meta Emily Green. In the 1940s, Green the leading figure in the Socialist Vanguard Group, an organisation linked with the Internationaler Sozialistischer Kampfbund, and also with the Society for the Furtherance of Critical Philosophy of Leonard Nelson. By the late 1940s, the Vanguard Group was best known for its anti-communism, and it was influential on the right wing of the Labour Party, publishing Socialist Commentary.

Green served for some years as the deputy general secretary of the Civil Service Clerical Association (CSCA). In 1955, the union's general secretary, Len White, died suddenly, and Green was appointed as his successor. As leader, he was known for his command of the complex pay scheme for civil servants, and he used his knowledge to obtain increases for union members - sometimes without the knowledge of the executive of his own union. In 1960, he was elected to the General Council of the Trades Union Congress.

As a civil servant, Green was due to retire at the age of 55 and, under union rules, would be forced to stand down. At the 1962 union conference, he claimed that the government's economic policy created special circumstances which required him to remain as leader. The delegates rejected this, and he retired as scheduled the following year.

Trade union offices
Preceded by Len White	General Secretary of the Civil Service Clerical Association; 1955 – 1963	Succeeded by Len Wines
Preceded by Douglas Houghton	Civil Servants group representative on the General Council of the TUC; 1960 – 1963; With: Ron Smith	Succeeded by Cyril Plant
