= G. F. Green =

George Frederick Green (1911–1977), was a British writer of novels and short stories.

== Biography ==
The son of the owner of an iron foundry, Green was born in Derbyshire. He was educated at Wells House preparatory school in Malvern, Repton School and Magdalene College, Cambridge, where he read English. During the 1930s he briefly tutored the young son of the publisher Jonathan Cape, but devoted most of his time to writing short stories about working-class life in the industrial North. These were published in most of the leading publications of the period, frequently anthologised, and collected in the 1948 volume Land Without Heroes. Called up in 1940 (he was anti-war but did not become a conscientious objector to spare his mother's feelings), he was posted to what was then Ceylon, where he edited a magazine for the Ceylonese forces titled Veera Lanka, which was published in both Sinhalese and Tamil. The job was not onerous, and he devoted his time to 'verandahism', a term he invented to describe hours passed on his private verandah, drinking, smoking, taking benzedrine and having sex with the locals. In 1944 he was caught in flagrante with a Sinhalese rickshaw-puller: he was court-martialled, cashiered and sentenced to two years' imprisonment. He served the first months in an old colonial jail on the island, during which time he kept a diary. This became the basis of an article entitled "Military Detention", which was published in 1947 under the pseudonym 'Lieut. Z' in Penguin New Writing no. 31. In February 1945 he was transferred to Wakefield Prison in Yorkshire, where he served the remainder of his sentence.

Released in 1946, he suffered a breakdown. He became a patient of the psychiatrist Dr Charlotte Wolff, who helped him to recover both his sense of identity and his ability to write. He remained rootless, however, wandering from place to place, and still drinking heavily. A legacy from an uncle in 1957 enabled him to settle in the Somerset village of Batcombe, where he bought and restored a house and created an elaborate Italianate garden. In 1950 he published an anthology of short stories about childhood titled First View, dedicated to the memory of Denton Welch, a writer he greatly admired. Closely allied to this anthology was his novel In the Making (1952), which drew upon his memories of Wells House, but was relocated from the Malverns to the Quantocks. Subtitled 'The Story of a Childhood', it traces the life of a boy called Randal Thane between the ages of six and fourteen, concentrating particularly upon his passionate obsession with an older boy called Felton. There followed a long silence—Green always found writing difficult—which was broken in 1972 with the appearance of a volume titled The Power of Sergeant Streater. Published as a novel, it is in fact three interrelated novellas each illustrating what Frank Tuohy identified as Green’s principal theme: ‘the relationship of an older man with a younger, of a different class or race’. Green spent the rest of his life working on a related volume of short stories 'on the theme of the failure of Love' and set in Ceylon and Morocco, where he went on holiday in 1975. Diagnosed with lung cancer, he committed suicide in 1977. The five stories he had completed were published alongside extracts from his other books and the reminiscences of his friends in a memorial volume titled A Skilled Hand, edited by his sister-in-law Chloë Green and the publisher A. D. Maclean.

== Works ==
- Land Without Heroes (stories) (1948)
- First View (edited) (1950)
- In the Making (1952)
- The Power of Sergeant Streater (1972)
- A Skilled Hand (1980)
