= Civil and Public Services Association =

Former trade union of the United Kingdom

CPSA
- Civil and Public Services Association
- Merged into: Public and Commercial Services Union
- Founded: 1921
- Dissolved: 1998
- Headquarters: 160 Falcon Road, London, SW11 2LN
- Location: United Kingdom
- Members: 216,000 (1980)
- Publication: Red Tape
- Affiliations: TUC, CCSU, CSA

The Civil and Public Services Association (CPSA) was a trade union in the United Kingdom, representing civil servants.

== History ==
The union was founded in 1921, when the Civil Service Clerical Union and the Clerical Officers' Association merged to form the Civil Service Clerical Association (CSCA). It affiliated with the Trades Union Congress (TUC) and the Labour Party and had around 16,000 members. Its Dublin branch left the following year, to form the Civil and Public Services Union.

Following the 1926 United Kingdom general strike, the Trade Disputes and Trade Unions Act 1927 was passed, requiring government employees to disaffiliate from political parties and trades union confederations, compelling the union to leave the Labour Party and the TUC. It rejoined the TUC in 1946.

In 1969, the union renamed itself the Civil and Public Services Association. In 1973, the Ministry of Labour Staff Association joined the CPSA, then the Court Officers Association joined in 1974.

In 1980, the CPSA published a history of its first 75 years, From Humble Petition to Militant Action.

In 1985, the union's Postal and Telecommunications Group left to merge with the Post Office Engineering Union, forming the National Communications Union.

The CPSA merged with the Public Services, Tax and Commerce Union in 1998, forming the Public and Commercial Services Union.

== 1986 General Secretary Election ==
Militant supporter John Macreadie initially won the ballot. However, the election was blocked and the courts ordered it to be re-run, with John Ellis receiving 42,000 votes, Macreadie 31,000, and the Broad Left '84 candidate, backed by the Communist Party, 13,000.

== Leadership ==
=== General Secretaries ===
1921: William Brown
1942: Len White
1955: George Green
1963: Len Wines
1967: Bill Kendall
1976: Ken Thomas
1982: Alistair Graham
1986: John Ellis
1992: Barry Reamsbottom

=== Presidents ===
1972: Len Lever
1975: Kate Losinska
1976: Len Lever
1979: Kate Losinska
1982: Kevin Roddy
1983: Kate Losinska
1986: Marion Chambers
