= GCHQ trade union ban =

Former ban of trade union members from Government Communications Headquarters

- Date: 1 March 1984 – 13 May 1997
- Duration: 13 years, 2 months and 12 days
- Venue: Government Communications Headquarters
- Location: Hubble Road, Cheltenham, Gloucestershire, England; 51°53′58″N 2°07′28″W
- Type: Trade union membership ban
- Organised by: Second Thatcher ministry of Conservative government

The GCHQ trade union ban was a ban on trade union membership of employees at the Government Communications Headquarters in Cheltenham between 1984 and 1997. This was based on the claim by the Conservative government that it undermined national security. It sparked a dispute which became a cause célèbre, one of the most important trade union issues of the 1980s and the second longest continuously fought dispute in British trade union history.

== History ==
In 1981, a series of strikes in Whitehall over pay led to industrial action at Government Communications Headquarters (GCHQ) intelligence 'listening centre' network based in Cheltenham. Following the expression of concern by US spymasters, trade unionism was banned at GCHQ (which monitors radio communications around the world as a part of an Anglo-American intelligence agreement).

The US security agency used its diplomatic influence to secure the union ban.

== Enforcement of the ban ==
On 25 January 1984, during the Second Thatcher ministry, Foreign Secretary Geoffrey Howe announced in the House of Commons that trade unionism was no longer acceptable at GCHQ. The TUC, CCSU, the leaders of all opposition parties, and MPs from all parties reacted with indignant anger at this declaration.

On 1 March 1984, the ban took effect and all GCHQ workers were ordered to leave their trade unions by 1 March 1984 and receive £1,000 (less tax) or face dismissal. Access to industrial tribunals was also banned. 130 GCHQ workers refused to sign away their union rights but the last 14 workers who were still holding out were not dismissed by the government until early 1989.

Fourteen GCHQ employees led by Mike Grindley refused to surrender union membership and were dismissed on the order of the Conservative government after refusing to relinquish union membership in exchange for £1,000. The GCHQ Staff Federation was an organisation created in the absence of orthodox unions.

The first four sackings, in November 1988, were followed by ten more during December and into the spring of 1989. The fourteen employees were thirteen men and one woman. They included Mandarin Chinese linguist Mike Grindley, executive officer Graham Hughes, telecommunications technician Brian Johnson and radio officer Alan Rowland (dismissed 18 November 1988), Robin Smith (dismissed 29 November 1988), electronics specialist Gerry O'Hagan (dismissed 5 December 1988), Dee Goddard (dismissed 12 January 1989), Margaret O'Hagan, Allan Chambers, Bill Bickham, cypher co-ordinator John Cook, radio officer Harry Underwood and Roy Taylor (dismissed 22 February 1989), and executive officer Gareth Morris (dismissed 2 March 1989). Only Alan Rowland, Gareth Morris and Dee Goddard made it back into mainstream employment.

== Aftermath ==
The issue became one of the most important trade union issues of the 1980s.

Trade unions argued the ban was a civil liberties violation, and mass protests followed and a number of mass national one-day strikes were held to protest this decision, seen as a first step to wider bans on trade unions. There was also a longer-term campaign against the ban from the civil service unions and the Trades Union Congress (TUC). The Labour Party supported the campaign and made a commitment to full union rights at GCHQ.

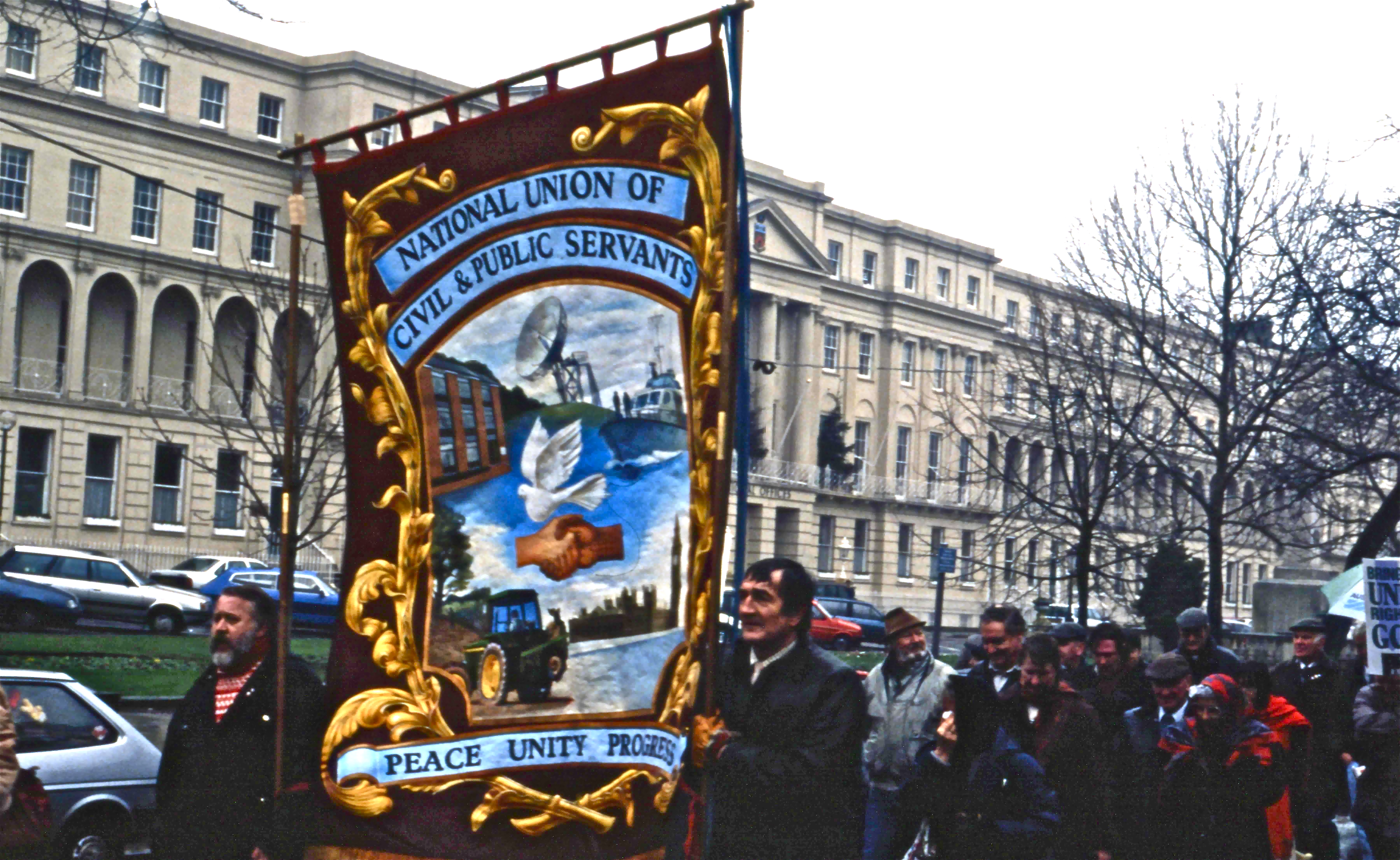
National Union of Civil and Public Servants banner during a march in Cheltenham in 1992

Thousands of people marched through Cheltenham every January on the anniversary of the ban and there were a series of twelve annual union rallies in Cheltenham. Issues of the campaign journal Warning Signal were published and media interviews were given. Trade union and party political conferences were addressed and branch meetings, trades councils, rallies and seminars, and MPs were regularly lobbied. The sacked workers travelled the country addressing conferences and meetings, trades councils and rallies.

The unions pursued legal arguments in British and international courts and appeals to British courts and the European Commission of Human Rights were unsuccessful. The government offered a sum of money to each employee who agreed to give up their union membership. Appeal to the International Labour Organization (ILO) resulted in a decision that government's actions were in violation of Freedom of Association and Protection of the Right to Organise Convention.

Grindley blocked any compromise by national union leaders with more amenable ministers and insisted that essential services have always been maintained during industrial action – a contention supported by Sir John Nott, the then secretary of state for defence, who said the industrial action had "not in any way affected operational capability".

By 1997, the campaigning 'Roadshow' had covered over 150,000 miles, attended over 350 events and raised a large amount of money for the cause. Every January there was a support rally in Cheltenham with top-level political and TUC speakers, each march through the town led by the National Union of Mineworkers (NUM), Frickley Colliery Brass Band, or the GMB Glasgow pipe band.

== Abolition of the ban ==
On 13 May 1997, the new Labour government allowed staff at GCHQ to join trade unions and offered Grindley and his former colleagues re-employment at the GCHQ intelligence network based in Cheltenham. Three of the fourteen dismissed workers resumed their careers at GCHQ, the others declined re-employment due to retirement or because they had embarked on other careers.

The Government Communications Group of the Public Services, Tax and Commerce Union (PTC) merged with the Civil and Public Services Association (CPSA) to form the Public and Commercial Services Union (PCS) to represent interested employees at all grades in March 1998.

As part of the debate on the Queen's Speech for the government's commitment to "open and fair relations" in the workplace, Foreign Secretary Robin Cook announced the end of the trade union ban. He added: "As part of that commitment I want today to right a long-standing wrong. Since 1984, we have been pledged to restore normal trade union rights to the staff of GCHQ." The Conservative Party's chief whip Alastair Goodlad said the decision had "potential implications for national security".

The general secretary of the Trades Union Congress, John Monks, said: "The ban has always been a blot on Britain's reputation for democracy and human rights. The previous government's belief that free trade unionism compromised national security was always an unjustified slur against the trade union movement and GCHQ staff in particular." Civil and Public Services Association general secretary Barry Reamsbottom said: "We have waited 13 long years for this dark stain on our democratic society to be removed." TUC former general secretary Brendan Barber said: "Of all the 1980s government attacks on trade unions, the GCHQ ban was the most spiteful".

Public and Commercial Services Union (PCS) Deputy general secretary Hugh Lanning said: "The successful restoration of trade union rights, jobs, and pensions in 1997, was a huge achievement following a long-running campaign, and we now have a thriving organisation in GCHQ."

Mike Grindley said: "It's been a mixture of tenseness, tiredness, excitement and endurance. We always knew in our heart of hearts that we would win our rights back, but if we had been told it would take 13 years, the prospect would have been daunting indeed."

In February 2000, the government announced the sacked GCHQ employees shared a payout of up to £550,000 after tax to compensate for lost earnings and pension rights. Public and Commercial Services union joint general secretary Barry Reamsbottom said: "We are delighted that this has finally been settled and that the fourteen members will have suffered no long term financial loss for sticking by their principles." By this time out of the fourteen, eight had retired, three had returned to GCHQ, and three had taken jobs elsewhere.

The ban was the second longest continuously fought dispute in British trade union history.

== See also ==
- Council of Civil Service Unions v Minister for the Civil Service
- Trade unions in the United Kingdom
