= SPSC =

SPSC may refer to:

- Scottish Palestine Solidarity Campaign, an organization in Scotland
- St Peter's College, Adelaide, a school in Australia
