= Independent Workers' Union of Great Britain =

British trades union

IWGB
- Independent Workers Union of Great Britain
- Logo and wordmark
- Founded: 14 June 2013; 13 years ago
- Headquarters: London, England, United Kingdom
- Location: Great Britain
- Members: ▲7,380 (2024)
- General Secretary: Henry Chango-Lopez
- President: Alex Marshall
- Affiliations: Progressive International
- Website: iwgb.org.uk

The Independent Workers' Union of Great Britain (IWGB) is a trade union in the United Kingdom. The IWGB is composed of eleven branches which organise workers within their chosen industry, run their own campaigns and have their own representative officials.

The IWGB is one of the main trade unions in challenging employment law, relating to the 'gig economy'.

The IWGB organises workers particularly in precarious employment and un-unionised sectors. In addition, the IWGB also engages in grassroots activism, not traditionally associated with trade unions.

== Formation ==
IWGB membership
year	members
2013	288
2014	405
2015	810
2016	915
2017	1,774
2018	3,810
2019	4,623
2020	6,324
2021	6,324
2022	6,658
2023	6,626
2024	7,380
Numbers represent memberships on last day of year, as reported to the Trades Union Certification Officer.

The IWGB began in part from dispute with Unite and UNISON, stemming from disagreements over, how to get better working conditions for cleaners at the University of London, and more disagreements - more broadly about how modern trade unions should be run.

== Sectors and organising methods ==
The IWGB represents and organises workers in precarious employment, as well traditionally un-unionised sectors of the "gig economy". These include cleaners, couriers and drivers, foster carers, video games workers, and yoga teachers.

In addition The IWGB is a campaigning union which has waged a number of high-profile campaigns and is notable for its grassroots activism, and its use of direct action and social media to generate widespread publicity and support. The first General Secretary of the IWGB, Jason Moyer-Lee, described one of union aims as:

Ramp up the pressure, using social media and by staging loud and disruptive protests, surprise protests and mini-occupations.

== Organising cleaners at University of London ==
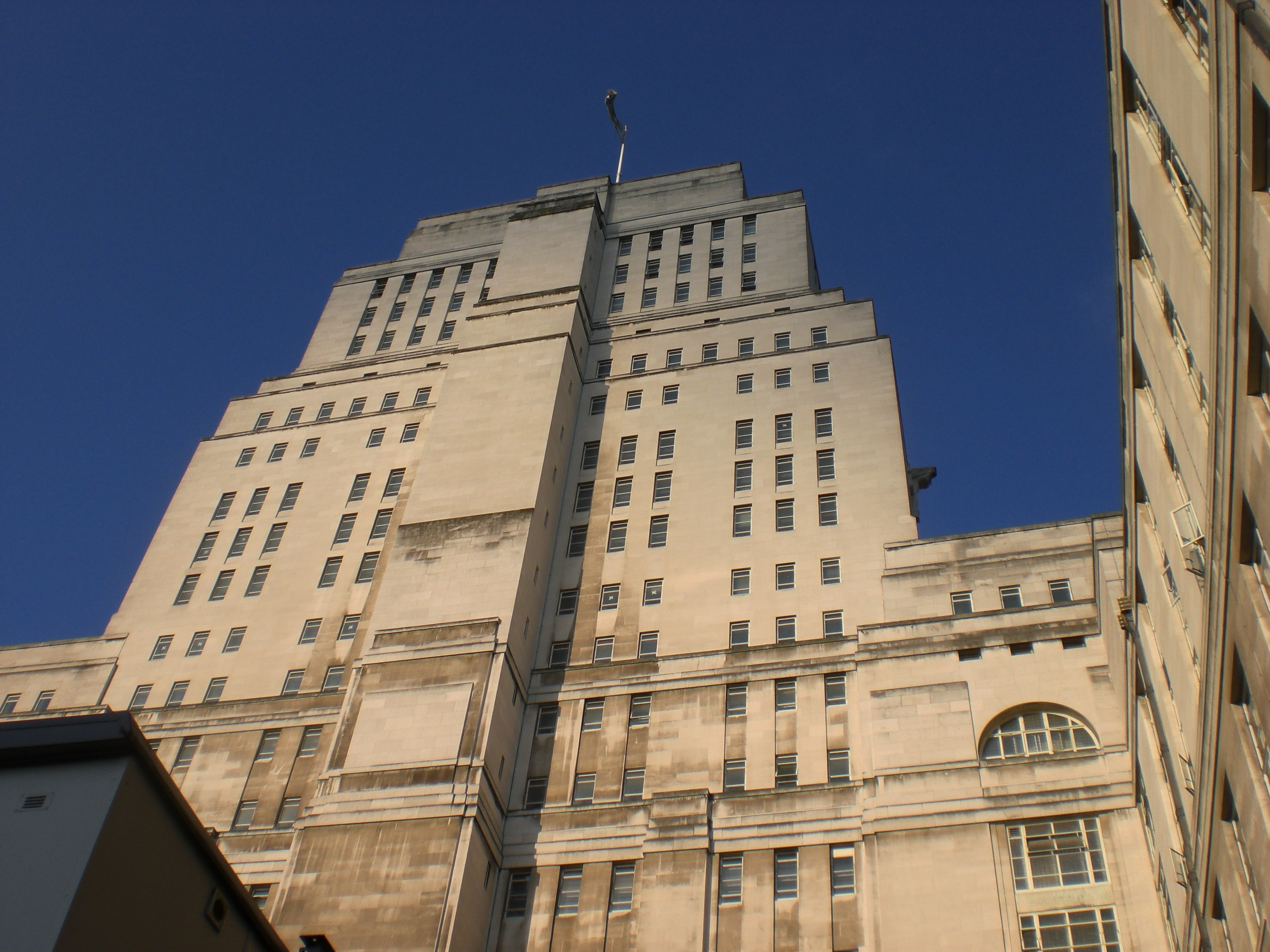
The 3 Cosas campaign centred on Senate House, University of London

3 Cosas ("3 Things") was a campaign led by mostly Latin American outsourced cleaners to improve their working conditions at the University of London. The three demands were for annual leave, sick pay, and adequate pension contributions. The strike was notable for gaining support from Green Party leader Natalie Bennett, and the Labour MPs Jeremy Corbyn, John McDonnell and Andy Burnham. The strike was noted for its 'red balloons, drums, and a sound system that played samba music, as well as workers turning delivery vehicles away from the gates".

Alongside strike action, the IWGB also launched a legal challenge to the University of London over the rights of 75 of their outsourced staff to negotiate their pay and conditions directly with the university itself. The IWGB, with the legal aid of the Good Law Project cited Article 11 of the European Convention on Human Rights to argue that the university's failure to negotiate directly with their de facto employees constituted an infringement on the right to collective bargaining enshrined in the convention. The case was considered a landmark legal challenge, with the potential to revolutionise the rights of outsourced workers in the UK.

In 2017 their outsourced employer Balfour Beatty Workplace agreed to most of the demands.

Following further strikes in 2017 and 2018, the University of London released a statement in June 2018 declaring that they would begin to bring some of their outsourced staff back in house. Although the statements were vague on timings, some concessions were made to the IWGBs demands, including an acknowledgement that direct action had influenced the decision. Following the statements, the IWGB organised a further strike for 6 June to keep up the pressure on the university for concrete commitments.

== Organising courier and delivery workers ==
The IWGB has argued that 'independent contractors' for Uber, Deliveroo and other delivery firms are in fact 'workers' and has achieved notable court decisions in this area.

=== Deliveroo ===
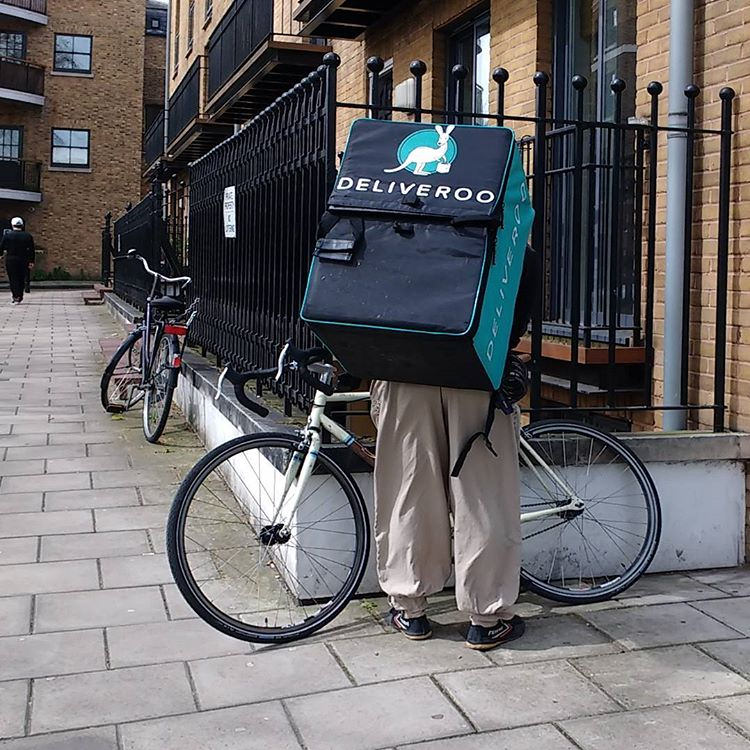
A Deliveroo cyclist in London, UK

In June 2018 Justice Simler gave the IWGB permission to challenge a 2017 ruling of the Central Arbitration Committee in the High Court, claiming that it was arguable that the CAC should have considered the rights of Deliveroo riders to bargain collectively as enshrined in Article 11 of the European Convention on Human Rights. The IWGB has so far raised just short of £25000 to cover the legal costs of the case. In a separate case, the IWGB assisted Deliveroo couriers in Brighton after they spontaneously protested over a lack of work. The IWGB demanded that Deliveroo implement a hiring freeze, as well as an increase in payment for deliveries from £4 to £5. Following these actions, Deliveroo wrote a letter to their couriers in Brighton stating that they would implement a hiring freeze, unrelated to the demands made by the IWGB.

=== Dewhurst v CitySprint ===
The IWGB supported Mags Dewhurst's Employment Tribunal against CitySprint. This considered whether the claimant was a worker of CitySprint as opposed to being self-employed or a 'contractor'.

The IWGB and Ms. Dewhurst were successful and the Employment Tribunal found that Ms. Dewhurst should be classed as a worker rather than self-employed. The Employment Tribunal labelled the contract as 'contorted', 'indecipherable', and 'window dressing', and noted that 'CitySprint ... has the power to regulate the amount of work available and it keeps its couriers busy by limiting the size of the fleet'.

The IWGB said this should be seen as a 'test case' and called for the decision to be rolled out across all of CitySprint's employees. CitySprint, who have a network of 3,500 couriers, disputed the verdict and the IWGB's claims stating that:

We are disappointed with today's ruling. It is important to remember that this applies to a single individual and was not a test case. We enjoy a good relationship with our fleet, many of whom have worked with us for some time, and have always strived to help them maximise their earnings.

In a later Employment Tribunal case, after CitySprint's courier contract for HCA Healthcare had been transferred to Revisecatch Ltd t/a Ecourier, the tribunal found that as 'workers' Ms Dewhurst and others enjoyed rights under TUPE legislation.

=== Boxer v Excel ===
The IWGB supported cycle courier Andrew Boxer's Employment Tribunal against employer Excel Group Services Ltd. He argued that he was entitled to one week of holiday pay based on his work for Excel, which amounted to £321.16. Mr Boxer worked 9 hours a day, 5 days a week and had no opportunity to negotiate his pay rate or to provide someone else to do work on his behalf. When asked about his contract Mr Boxer said: "I had no choice, it would not have made a difference, they would have laughed at me if I had challenged a particular clause"

Judge Joanna Wade, who presided over the Employment Tribunal, said that she classified Boxer as a worker, and not an independent contractor. She said that the contract that Boxer signed "did not reflect the reality of the situation... the inequality of bargaining power at this point was very notable". Excel did not provide witness evidence or attend the tribunal hearing. The firm initially offered to pay the claim for holiday pay "without acceptance of the claimant's claim". This was rejected by Mr Boxer.

=== eCourier admittal of wrongful classification ===
eCourier admitted to wrongly denying employment benefits to one of their couriers, IWGB member Demille Flanore, after incorrectly classifying him as an independent contractor rather than employee. The admittal came in response to an employment tribunal claim made by Flanore to contest his status – rather than contest the case, eCourier chose instead to admit their wrongdoing. The event was described as 'a major sea change' by the IWGB, reflecting the changing landscape of the gig economy.

=== IWGB v Addison Lee ===
IWGB supported the case of cycle courier Chris Gascoigne in a case against his employer, Addison Lee, in August 2017. Following similar rulings in other IWGB supported cases against Excel, CitySprint, Uber and eCourier, employment Judge Joanna Wade ruled that Gascoigne was to be considered a 'worker' and not a 'self-employed contractor' as Addison Lee had alleged. Jason Moyer-Lee described the case as another 'domino' within the changing law around the gig-economy, signifying progress in the IWGBs aim to ramp up the pressure against these employers.

=== Aslam v Uber BV ===
The IWGB took over an employment tribunal case against Uber in 2017 on behalf of two of 2 Uber drivers, James Farrar and Yaseen Aslam, The remainder of the claimants stayed with GMB union. Prior to an appeal of the case that they had begun the year before.

=== The Doctors Laboratory collective bargaining agreement ===
In March 2018, the IWGB became the first union to be recognised within the gig-economy for collective bargaining. The ruling came within a campaign the IWGB was organising with couriers at The Doctors Laboratory (TDL), a private courier service that works with the NHS to provide delivery services. For many months, TDL refused to recognise the IWGB, before the Central Arbitration Committee ruled on the case, obliging TDL to recognise the union as representative of the couriers. Previous to the ruling, the IWGB had secured full employment rights for a number of their members at TDL.

== Alleged union busting at Rockstar ==
On the 30th of October 2025, 31 Rockstar employees were fired for "gross misconduct" and "leaking confidential information", leading to rallies outside the studio's Edinburgh office over alleged union busting. Rockstar has stated that the 31 employees were "found to be distributing and discussing confidential information in a public forum, a violation of our company policies". The firings, which came after ongoing attempts to form a union, are being challenged in an employment tribunal.

== Political activities ==
=== Article 50 Supreme Court intervention ===
The IWGB also intervened in the R (Miller) v Secretary of State for Exiting the European Union case. The IWGB intervened on the grounds that the UK's decision to leave the EU necessitates a debate in Parliament because the UK's decision to leave the EU directly affects its members. The IWGB were allowed to provide a written submission of up to a maximum of 20 pages, and sought the opportunity to present a brief oral submission of no more than 45 minutes, on issues surrounding the UK's decision to leave the EU.

=== Legal Letter on £1 billion DUP Deal ===
In September 2017, the IWGB co-penned a legal letter to the government, claiming that they were required to seek parliamentary approval for £1 billion spending in Northern Ireland under the Conservative–DUP agreement. The IWGB acted on behalf of their members, with Jason Moyer-Lee claiming that:

Many IWGB members’ jobs depend on public money, like foster care workers and low-paid outsourced university staff. They are routinely told that there's no money available to improve their pay, holidays and other terms and conditions they demand. Yet when it comes to keeping themselves in power, this government's fiscal discipline quickly dissipates. There's undoubtedly a need for increased social spending throughout the UK but this should be on a basis of fairness; not self-serving party politics.

Following the letter, the government announced that they would be seeking parliamentary approval before the release of these funds to Northern Ireland.

== See also ==
- Trade unions in the United Kingdom
- United Voices of the World
- Industrial Workers of the World § Great Britain and Ireland
- General unionism
- Industrial unionism
- Game Workers Unite
