= Paul v NALGO =

- Court: High Court of Justice
- Citation: [1987] IRLR 413

Keywords
- Trade union, governance

Paul v NALGO [1987] IRLR 413 is a UK labour law case, concerning the governance of trade unions in the United Kingdom.

== Facts ==
P and F, members of NALGO, claimed the union's publications against the Tories were unlawful under Trade Union Act 1913, section 3(3)(f) providing funds could not be used to persuade people to not vote for a candidate – unless there had been a political objects clause, under what is now Trade Union and Labour Relations (Consolidation) Act 1992, section 72(1)(f).

== Judgment ==
Sir Nicolas Browne-Wilkinson VC held the literature was unlawful under the TUA 1913 s 3(3)(f) as its main purpose was to persuade people to not vote Tory, and so was unlawful.

== See also ==
- UK labour law
