= Roebuck v NUM (Yorkshire Area) No 2 =

- Court: High Court
- Citation: [1978] ICR 676

Keywords
- Trade union, collective bargaining

Roebuck v NUM (Yorkshire Area) No 2 [1978] ICR 676 is a UK labour law case, concerning trade union regulation.

== Facts ==
Union members gave evidence for the Sheffield Star in a libel action by Mr Arthur Scargill. They were disciplined by their union under its rules, prompted by Mr Scargill who chaired the disciplinary panel. They were found in breach and disqualified from office for two years.

== Judgment ==
Templeman J held that the disciplinaries were unlawful. He noted that "all members of a domestic tribunal where the interests of their own organisation are at stake, have a general inclination to defend the union and its officers against attack from any source." Scargill's role as chairman "undoubtedly gave the impression that the dice were loaded against... the appearance of bias was inevitable." The question is "whether a reasonable man with no inside knowledge might well think that it might be biased." Here it was obvious.

== See also ==
- UK labour law
