= CitySprint =

UK courier and logistics company

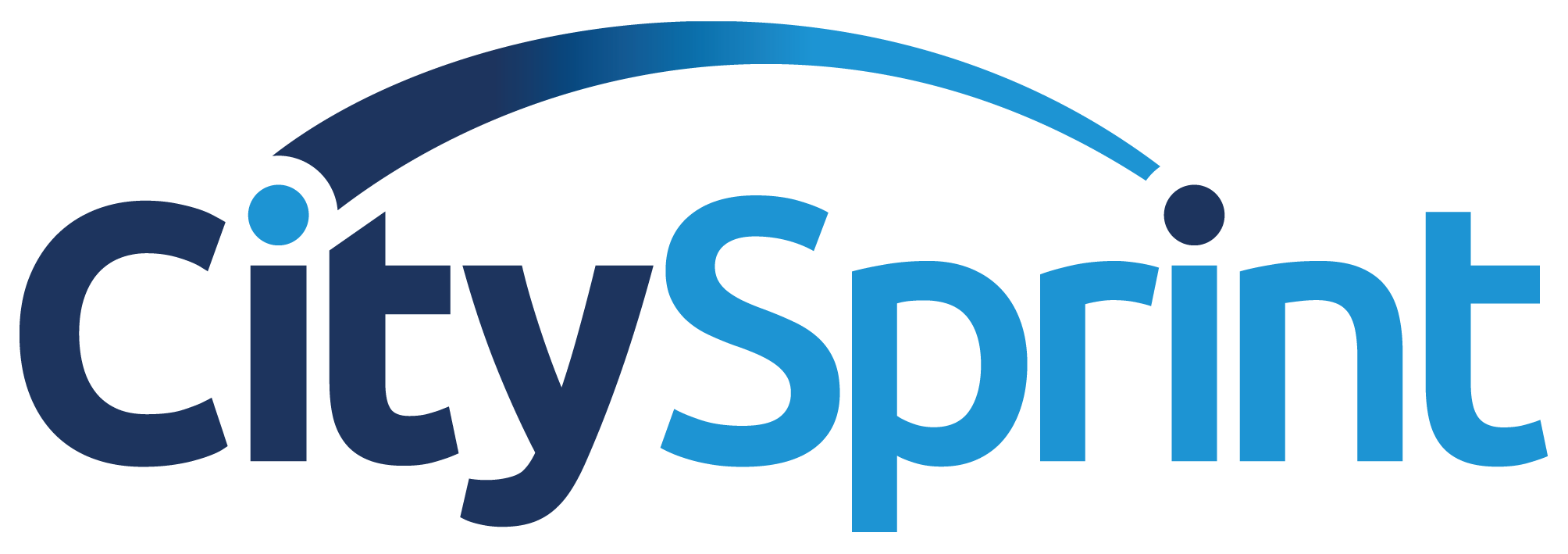
- Type: Limited
- Industry: Courier and Logistics
- Founded: 1999
- Founder: Ian Lewis; Andrew Bernard
- Headquarters: London, United Kingdom
- Area served: United Kingdom, Worldwide
- Services: Same day courier UK overnight courier International delivery Logistics
- Parent: DPD Group
- Website: www.citysprint.co.uk

CitySprint is a courier and logistics company based in the UK. The company operates the brands On the dot, CitySprint Health, CitySprint Office, Transworld and CityBags.

== History ==
CitySprint was launched as a brand in 1999 as part of DMS Corporation. It was incorporated in the UK in 2000 ahead of an MBO in 2001 led by Andrew Bernard to form a same day courier company.

In 2003, they launched their own operating platform, CityTrak, to manage job booking, scheduling and courier tracking. In 2009, CitySprint introduced a real-time GPS tracking system to allow customers to track their deliveries whilst the courier is en route, an industry first at the time. In the same year, CitySprint used the MetaPack delivery management software to enable ASOS.com to offer a same day delivery service to those living within the M25 and surrounding areas as well a 50-mile radius of their warehouse in Hemel Hempstead.

In 2017, CitySprint unsuccessfully fought a tribunal case relating to a single courier, which found that the individual in question was a worker, rather than self-employed. After losing the case, it chose to apply the ruling to that courier only and require couriers to sign new contracts instead of pay couriers minimum wage and vacation pay, causing the Independent Workers' Union of Great Britain general secretary to call the act a "mockery of our system of employment rights and protections".

In 2017, CitySprint sponsored British racing driver Ashley Sutton during his second year in the British Touring Car Championship. In 2018, it became the first courier company to use a hydrogen van for deliveries.

== Operations ==
They operate as a logistics services provider that offers freight, AOG and multi-drop. The company has brands to manage specific delivery requirements including CitySprint Health (healthcare), CitySprint Office (print, post and fulfilment), Transworld (UK overnight and international) and CityBags (luggage repatriation).

As of 2019, the company has a wholly owned network of 35 service centres and over 5,000 self-employed couriers.

== Acquisitions ==
The company has made significant acquisitions from 2010 to expand the company in the UK. In 2017, the company acquired Express Couriers, Grasshopper Couriers and Transworld Couriers. CitySprint has acquired the Peps Couriers, ASAP International, Courier Co-operative and Excel Couriers in 2016.
