= Fran Heathcote =

British trade unionist

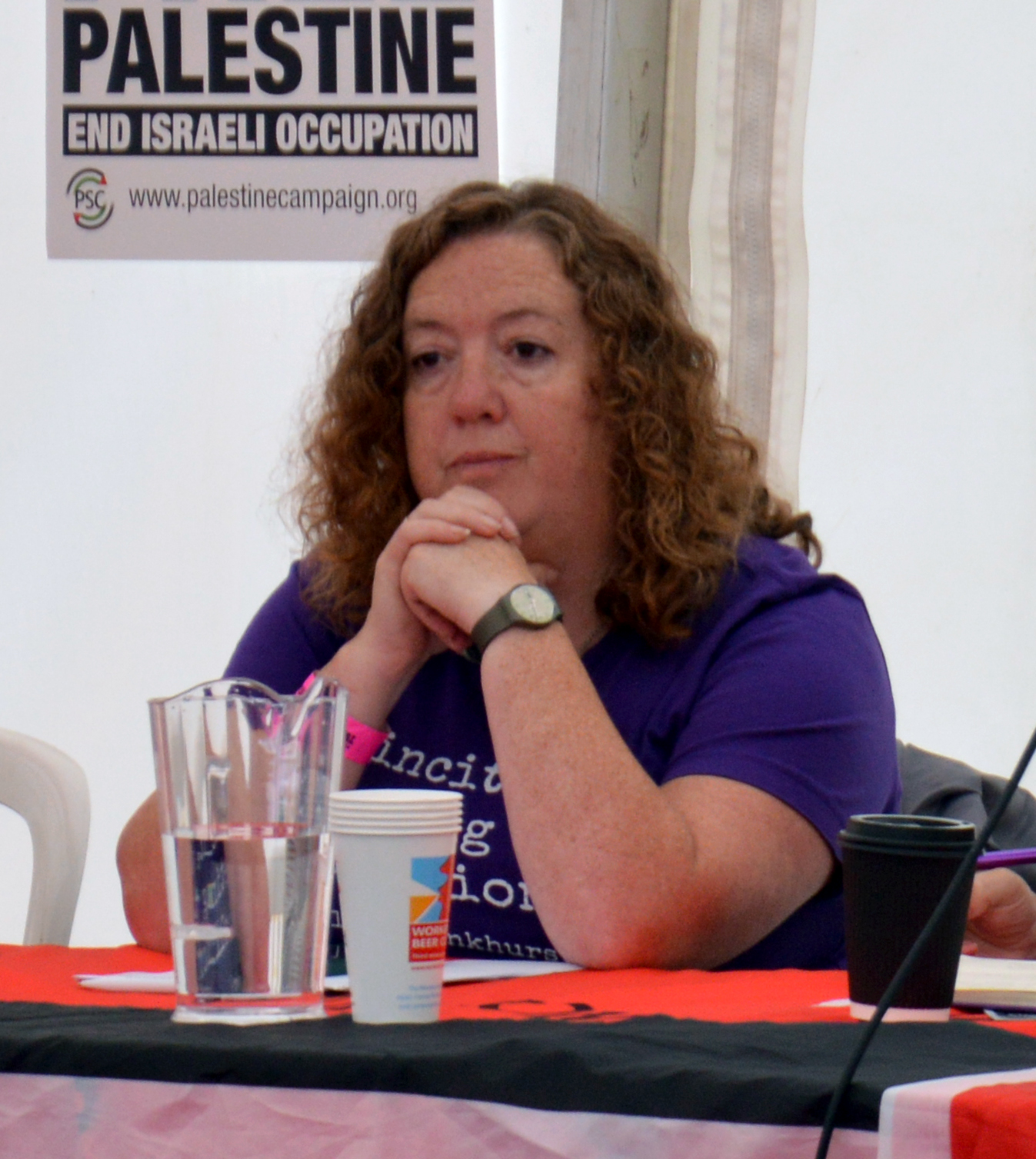
Fran Heathcote

Fran Heathcote is a British trade unionist and the current General Secretary of the Public and Commercial Services Union (PCS), having assumed the office on 1 February 2024 following the retirement of Mark Serwotka. Heathcote has worked for the Department for Work and Pensions and its predecessor organizations for more than 30 years.

She served as the union's president until her election as General Secretary.

== 2023 General Secretary Election ==
On 17 May 2023, Mark Serwotka announced that he would stand down as General Secretary after 23 years. In the subsequent election to choose his successor, Heathcote, backed by the Left Unity faction defeated Marion Lloyd of the Broad Left faction. She was elected on 10,340 votes to Lloyd's 9,557.

Trade union offices
| Preceded by Janice Godrich | President of the Public and Commercial Services Union; 2019–2024 | Succeeded by Martin Cavanagh |
| Preceded by Mark Serwotka | General Secretary of the Public and Commercial Services Union; 2024-present | Succeeded by Incumbent |
