= Public and Commercial Services Union =

British trade union

PCS
- Public and Commercial Services Union
- Founded: 1998; 28 years ago
- Headquarters: 160 Falcon Road, London
- Location: United Kingdom
- Members: ▲169,864 (2026)
- General Secretary: Fran Heathcote
- Assistant General Secretary: John Moloney
- President: Bev Laidlaw
- Affiliations: TUC; ICTU; STUC; NSSN; PSI; EPSU
- Website: pcs.org.uk

The Public and Commercial Services Union (PCS) is the eighth largest trade union in the United Kingdom. Most of its members work in UK government departments and other public bodies.

== History ==
The union was founded in 1998 by the merger of the Public Services, Tax and Commerce Union (which mostly represented the executive grades of the Civil Service) and the Civil and Public Services Association (mostly representing the clerical grades). The General Secretaries of the two unions, John Sheldon and Barry Reamsbottom respectively, became Joint General Secretaries of the new union. In 2000, Mark Serwotka was elected General Secretary and held the position until his retirement on 31 January 2024: he was elected unopposed in 2005 (no other candidate received enough valid nominations from PCS branches); he was re-elected in 2009 for a five-year term, and in 2014 was re-elected for a further five years.

In 2018, the union won £3 million in damages from the Department for Work and Pensions, after a legal challenge against the withdrawal of the "check off" system of paying union subscriptions.

Fran Heathcote was elected as the union's first female General Secretary, defeating Marion Lloyd. She assumed the office on 1 February 2024.

== Membership and organisation ==
PCS is the largest trade union representing civil servants in the UK. As of May 2026, the Union had 169,864 members. Between 2014 and 2015, the UK Government imposed a ban on PCS members paying for their membership via the 'check off' system which allows unions to collect membership dues via payroll, rather than requiring members to manually arrange payments. This had a significant impact on the finances of PCS and on total membership numbers as many memberships lapsed when individuals failed to manually set up alternative means of payment. In 2024, PCS won a landmark case in the Supreme Court where the justices unanimously agreed that the UK Government acted unlawfully. PCS General Secretary, Fran Heathcote, characterised the UK Government actions as an attempt to 'break civil service trade unionism'.

PCS membership since 2012
Year	Members
2012	262,819
2013	247,345
2014	231,323
2015	195,091
2016	185,785
2017	181,063
2018	180,646
2019	177,540
2020	177,103
2021	183,442
2022	191,289
2023	189,399
2024	174,134
2025	169,420
2026	169,864

=== Organisation ===
PCS is organised into groups that deal with different bargaining units such as Revenue and Customs, Work and Pensions and Law and Justice.

=== Factions ===
Multiple factions compete in internal elections. During contests for positions on the National Executive Committee, PCS' governing body, factions regularly campaign under combined electoral slates known as 'alliances'. In the 2025 and 2026 NEC elections these were the 'Democracy Alliance', which is led by the PCS Left Unity faction, and the 'Coalition for Change', which is formed through an electoral pact between the PCS Independent Left and PCS Broad Left Network factions respectively.

== Elections ==
=== 2026 president election ===
In March 2026, the Coalition for Change, announced that Bev Laidlaw would be their candidate in the 2026 election for president challenging the incumbent, Martin Cavanagh. During the election campaign, Laidlaw criticised Cavanagh's use of presidential rulings and pledged to improve the transparency and accountability of the president if she won. Democracy Alliance candidate, Cavanagh, pledged to work more closely with the General Secretary and accused the Coalition for Change candidates for ignoring members when they previously resisted attempts to refund strike levy payments. The ballot closed at noon on the 8 May 2026, where Laidlaw won the presidency from Cavanagh by 234 votes. Candidates aligned with Laidlaw and the Coalition for Change programme secured a majority of 21 out of 35 seats on the NEC.

2026 Election of the president
Candidate	Branch nominations	Votes	%	Result
Bev Laidlaw	57	5,455	50%	Elected
Martin Cavanagh	56	5,221	47.8%	Not Elected
Invalid votes		236	2.2%	N/A
Turnout		10,912	6.4%	N/A

=== 2023 general secretary election and assistant general secretary election ===
In May 2023, Mark Serwotka announced his decision not to seek re-election following a heart transplant. For the first time in the union's history, the next General Secretary was guaranteed to be a woman as the two confirmed candidates were both female. Fran Heathcote, the then incumbent PCS President, stood against Marion Lloyd, the PCS Group President within the Department for Business, Energy and Industrial Strategy. Heathcote represented the PCS Left Unity faction while Lloyd represented the PCS Broad Left Network faction. During the campaign, Marion Lloyd and John Moloney both pledged not to accept the salaries offered by PCS for the roles of General Secretary and Assistant General Secretary if they won, instead publicly pledging to remain on their current wage and pay the rest back to the PCS fighting fund. Fran Heathcote and Paul O'Connor emphasised their record as the existing PCS President and as a senior full time employee of PCS respectively. The ballot closed at noon on the 14 December 2023, and counting was done independently by Civica Election Services. Fran Heathcote was elected as General Secretary and John Moloney was elected as Assistant General Secretary.

2023 Election of general secretary
Candidate	Branch nominations	Votes	%	Result
Fran Heathcote	90	10,340	51.6%	Elected
Marion Lloyd	80	9,557	47.6%	Not Elected
Invalid votes		161	0.8%	N/A
Turnout		20,058	11.5%	N/A

2023 election of assistant general secretary
Candidate	Branch nominations	Votes	%	Result
John Moloney	87	11,705	58.4%	Elected
Paul O'Connor	84	8,152	40.6%	Not Elected
Invalid votes		201	1%	N/A
Turnout		20,058	11.5%	N/A

== PCS Credit Union ==
PCS Credit Union Limited is a savings and loans co-operative established by the trade union for its members in 2011. It is a member of the Association of British Credit Unions Limited, authorised by the Prudential Regulation Authority and regulated by the Financial Conduct Authority and the PRA. Members’ savings are protected against business failure by the Financial Services Compensation Scheme.

== PCS Parliamentary Group ==
The PCS Parliamentary Group is a cross-party group of MPs who meet throughout the year to discuss issues and campaigns which PCS highlight, and concerns within the civil service broadly. The group makes parliamentary interventions, including writing to ministers, speaking at committee and participating in debates on behalf of PCS. The group is chaired by Labour MP John McDonnell, and is also attended by Jeremy Corbyn, Carla Denyer, Graham Leadbitter, and Liz Saville Roberts. PCS makes financial contributions to John McDonnell for his work administrating the group, in 2025-2026 this amounted to £36,000. John McDonnell was chosen to address the PCS 2026 Annual Delegate Conference as a guest speaker in his role as the PCS Parliamentary Group Chair.

== Affiliations ==
Organisations to which PCS is affiliated include Abortion Rights, Amnesty International and the Cuba Solidarity Campaign.

== Strikes and protests involving PCS members ==
=== 2008 ===
- In conjunction with Prospect, members at the Science Museum went on strike over pay.

=== 2010 ===
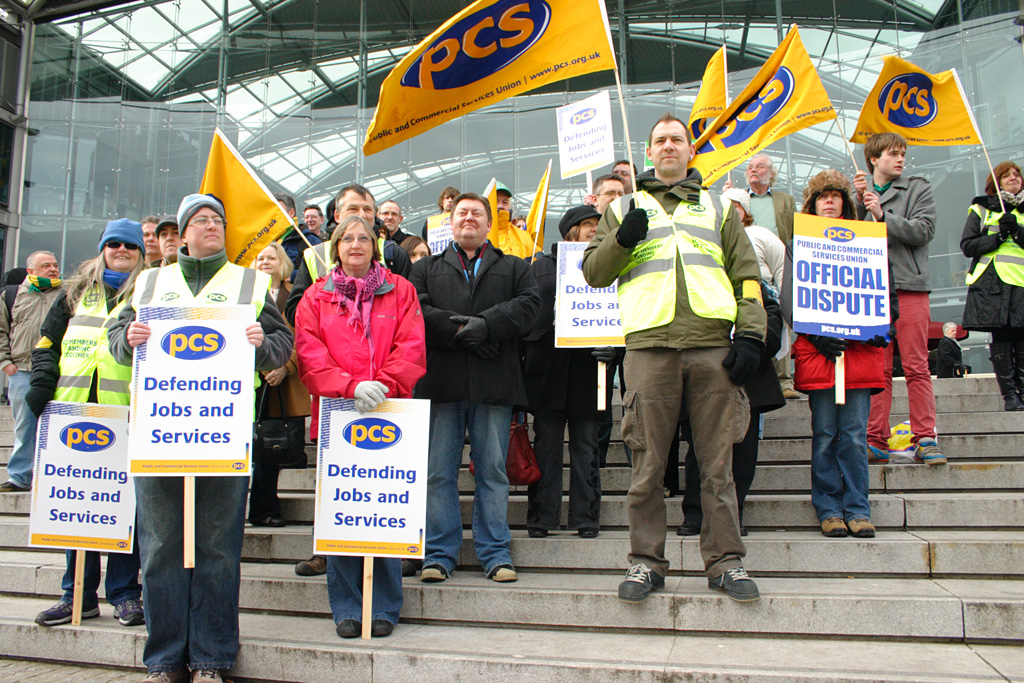
PCS members on strike in 2010.

- On 8 March 2010, 270,000 civil servants began a 48-hour strike over government changes to redundancy payments.

=== 2011 ===
- The union voted for a one-day strike on 30 June 2011.

=== 2013 ===
- Strike action was organised for New Year's Eve 2013 for all Metropolitan Police Civil Staff due to a pay dispute. Taking strike action on this day was deemed to be most effective because of the busy nature of the day for police. The MPS offered a below inflation wage increase of 1%. Another strike ballot was announced on 6 February 2014 for strike action on 12 and 13 February 2014.
- As part of the union's budget day strikes, a series of protests took place across branches in the Culture Group, including Tate and National Museums Liverpool to highlight the effect of government cuts to arts funding.

=== 2014 ===
- PCS announced they would be joining a national strike alongside other unions on Budget Day - 10 July, over pay restraint and austerity in the public sector.

=== 2015 ===
- From 11 August 2015, PCS members at the National Gallery took indefinite strike action against a proposed privatisation of the security staff at the gallery. The strike lasted for more than 100 days.
- At the Amgueddfa Cymru – National Museum Wales branch, members voted for strike action after proposals to end their weekend pay premiums.
- Members of the Royal Household branch, including staff at Windsor Castle, voted for action short of a strike in an effort to achieve the Living Wage.
- Another of the union's Culture Group branches went on strike in December 2015 against the removal of weekend allowances. The dispute at the National Museum of Scotland branch was eventually ended when funding from the Scottish Government enabled a buy out of the allowances.

=== 2016 ===
- Cleaners in HMRC went on strike as their outsourced employer, ISS, claimed it couldn't afford the Government's new National Living Wage.

=== 2017 ===
- Strike action of Driving Examiners was organised for 4 and 5 December to coincide with the introduction of new driving tests in order to protest against the introduction of Satellite Navigation to the test on 4 December. Examiners also voted started work to rule on 23 November.

=== 2019 ===
- In conjunction with GMB, PCS members at Historic Royal Palaces took strike action against proposed changes to their pensions. This was the first time the Beefeaters had been on strike in 55 years.
- Outsourced workers at the Department for Business, Energy and Industrial Strategy (BEIS) went on strike to demand the London Living Wage in a coordinated action with United Voices of the World (UVW) union members at the nearby Ministry of Justice.
- In December 2019, Security Guards and Front of House workers at Wallace Collection successfully protested outside an exhibition opening to secure the London Living Wage.

=== 2020 ===
- Following mass redundancies in the arts and culture sector caused by the COVID-19 lockdown, PCS members working for the commercial arm of Tate galleries in London took 42 days strike action against mass redundancies. A further 300 redundancies were also announced at Southbank Centre, leading to mass protests by PCS members outside the venues.

=== 2021 ===
- After a large, and in several cases fatal, COVID-19 outbreak in the offices of the Drivers and Vehicle Licensing Agency (DVLA), PCS members took multiple days of strike action in June and July to highlight the lack of adequate health and safety protection.

=== 2026 ===
- 2026 Victoria and Albert Museum strikes: Members at the Victoria and Albert Museum went on strike alongside members of Prospect over pay and working conditions.

== Leadership ==
=== General Secretaries ===
1998: John Sheldon and Barry Reamsbottom
2000: Mark Serwotka
2024: Fran Heathcote

=== Assistant general secretaries ===
2000: Hugh Lanning
2004: Chris Baugh and Hugh Lanning
2013: Chris Baugh
2019: John Moloney

=== Presidents ===
1998: Peter Donnellan
2002: Janice Godrich
2019: Fran Heathcote
2024: Martin Cavanagh
2026: Bev Laidlaw

== See also ==
- Lobbying in the United Kingdom
- British Civil Service
- Trades Union Congress
- FDA (trade union)
- Credit unions in the United Kingdom
