= Palestine Solidarity Campaign =

UK advocacy organisation

- Abbreviation: PSC
- Formation: 1982; 44 years ago
- Purpose: Activism
- Location: London, England
- Director: Ben Jamal
- Main organ: Executive Committee
- Affiliations: SPSC
- Website: palestinecampaign.org

The Palestine Solidarity Campaign (PSC) is an activist organisation in England and Wales. It was founded in the UK in 1982 and incorporated in 2004 as Palestine Solidarity Campaign Ltd. In 2023, The Guardian described it as "Europe’s largest Palestinian rights organisation".

== Structure ==
The PSC is an activist organisation in England and Wales, based in London. It is politically unaligned. There are also the Scottish Palestine Solidarity Campaign (SPSC) and the Ireland Palestine Solidarity Campaign (IPSC). The latter is a separate organisation set up in late 2001 by established Irish human rights and community activists. Jeremy Corbyn, Hugh Lanning and Tony Greenstein have all been involved with the group. In 2017, Jewish News reported that Lanning (then chair of PSC) was barred from entering Israel; the Israeli embassy in the UK said this was in part due to his connections with Hamas, which the EU had declared a terrorist organisation.

Its director from 2016 has been former social worker Ben Jamal, the son of a Palestinian Anglican vicar and an English mother.

== Boycott Israeli goods campaign ==
In 2010, the Trades Union Congress (TUC) agreed to boycott produce grown on Israeli settlements. The PSC organised disruptions of a performance by the Israel Philharmonic at the Royal Albert Hall in February 2011. BBC Radio 3, which was broadcasting the concert live, was forced to suspend the broadcast several times due to the protesters' shouting and heckling.

On 28 May 2012, when Israel's Habima Theatre company performed at the London Shakespeare's Globe Theatre, the PSC and other BDS groups organised a protest outside the building. On 29 May 2012, BBC Radio 4 reported that Habima was "being criticised for performing to Jewish audiences in the Occupied Territories." A PSC press release corrected the report, saying that it was criticising Habima "for performing in illegal Israeli settlements in the West Bank." After six months of pressure by PSC, the BBC Trust upheld the PSC's complaint. The Trust report stated "the complaint was upheld with regard to Accuracy, not upheld with regard to Impartiality and Fairness." The PSC waged a two-year campaign to block an EU trade agreement, the ACAA, that recognised Israeli pharmaceutical standards as equal to those in Europe. The agreement was passed in October 2012.

== Other activism ==
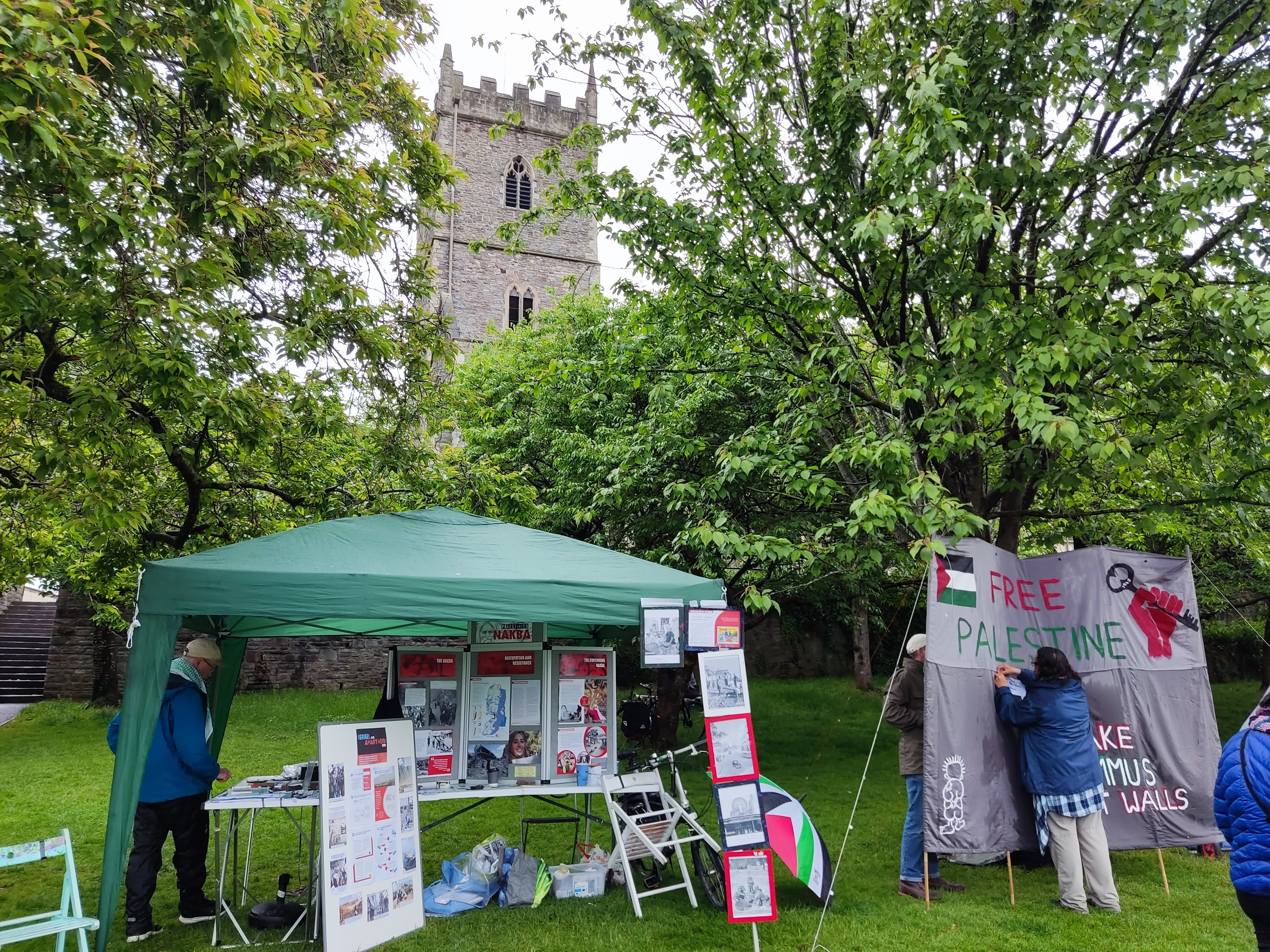
Nakba Day commemoration event by Bristol PSC in Castle Park, 15 May 2022

Sarah Colborne (then director of the PSC) was on board the Mavi Marmara during the 2010 flotilla raid.

The PSC arranged a 30 March 2012 "Land Day" protest outside the Israeli Embassy in London.

Launching a campaign against what it termed Israeli apartheid in 2019, the PSC announced that universities in the UK were investing almost £450 million in companies which were aiding in Israeli breaches of international law. It produced a database of these investments. Also in 2019 the PSC signed a letter alongside over 200 other groups calling on the International Criminal Court to begin investigating war crimes committed by Israeli in the Palestinian territories.

In 2021, the PSC organised a march in support of Palestine in London which was attended by over 180,000 people. Other events took place in Bristol, Nottingham and Peterborough. The group was protesting against an Israeli bombing offensive which had killed over 230 people in eleven days. Black Lives Matter supported the march.

After the 7 October 2023 slayings began the Gaza war, PSC was the main organiser of a series of demonstrations jointly with Friends of Al-Aqsa, the Stop the War Coalition, the Muslim Association of Britain, the Palestinian Forum in Britain and the Campaign for Nuclear Disarmament. These included a march on 21 October, with some 100,000 participants in London, a national demonstration on 11 November, at which police estimated 300,000 marchers and organisers estimated 800,000, 25 November in London, attended by tens of thousands, local rallies and vigils on 2 December, and a national demonstration called for 9 December.

On 8 October 2023, Member of Parliament Apsana Begum posed with the PSC at their stand at the Labour Party conference in Liverpool.

In late October, PSC Director Ben Jamal said Keir Starmer's statement that Israel had the right to cut off water and electricity to Gaza was "grotesque". Also in October, four members in Manchester were suspended for describing an attack by Hamas gunmen as a "heroic move" in which "Palestinian freedom fighters from besieged Gaza broke Zionist colonial barriers and entered settlements built on stolen Palestinian land". The 11 November London demonstration was controversial as it coincided with Armistice Day; after complaints from Conservative politicians that this was "provocative and disrespectful", far right counterprotesters announced they would defend the Cenotaph from marchers, although the march was not planned to go near it. At the 25 November demonstration, one protester was arrested on suspicion of inciting racial hatred, for carrying a placard with Nazi symbols on it. The chant "From the river to the sea, Palestine will be free" was widely used.

== See also ==
- Economic and political boycotts of Israel
- Palestine Action
- Students for Justice in Palestine – also known as Palestine Solidarity Committee
