= Mark Serwotka =

British trade unionist (born 1963)

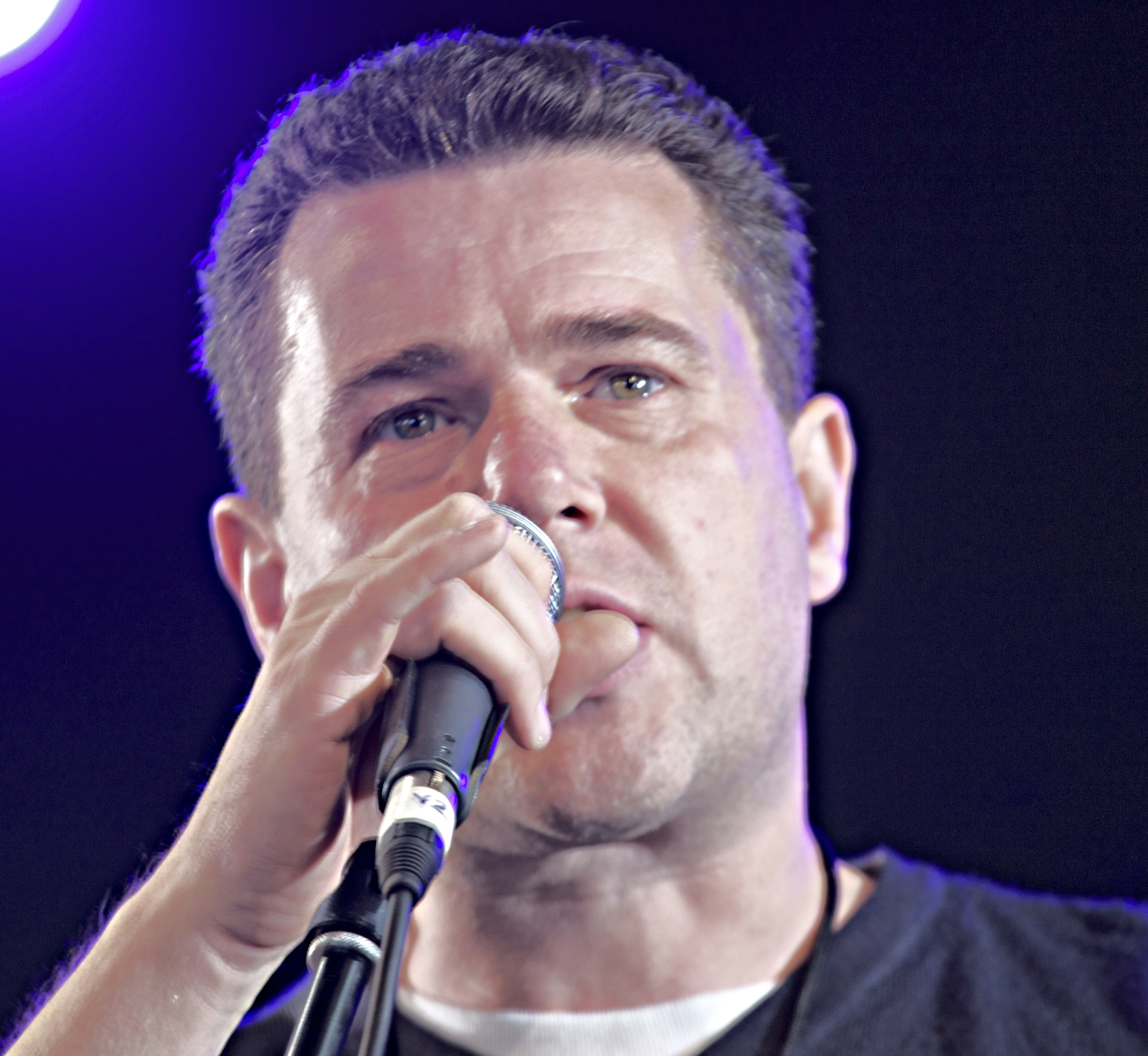
Serwotka in 2008

Mark Henryk Serwotka (/ˈsɛərvoʊtkə/; born 26 April 1963) is a retired trade unionist who was General Secretary of the Public and Commercial Services Union (PCS), the largest trade union representing British civil servants. He was President of the Trades Union Congress (TUC) for 2019.

== Early life ==
Serwotka was adopted by a Polish-born father and a Welsh mother and brought up in Aberdare.

== Career ==
In 1979, aged sixteen, he joined the Civil Service as a benefits clerk, joining the union on his first day. He became a union representative in 1980 and a personal case officer in 1995.

In the 2000 election for General Secretary, he faced two rivals: Hugh Lanning of the Membership First faction and the incumbent Barry Reamsbottom of the National Moderate Group. However, Reamsbottom did not secure the fifty branch nominations needed to appear on the ballot paper. Serwotka then beat Lanning with 41,000 to 33,000 votes. Following Serwotka's election, Reamsbottom refused to step down when his term of office expired, citing what he claimed were legal irregularities in the election process. The dispute was taken to the High Court where Serwotka won and subsequently assumed office.

In 2005, Serwotka was elected unopposed for another term as General Secretary as he was the only candidate with the required 25 branch nominations. In 2009, Serwotka was re-elected for a five-year term, with 37,866 votes to Rob Bryson's 21,883. In 2014, he was elected unopposed for a fourth five-year term.

In the 2000 General Secretary election, Serwotka pledged that if elected he would only accept the equivalent of an average civil servant's wage. Serwotka returns around £8,000 of his annual salary to the union.

Serwotka was elected President of the Trades Union Congress (TUC) for 2019, a prominent but largely honorary position.

In May 2023, Serwotka announced his intention to retire after 24 years, with his tenure ending at the end of January 2024 after the election of Fran Heathcote as his replacement.

== Political views ==
Serwotka was a member of Socialist Organiser in the late 1980s and early 1990s. He was later a supporter of the Socialist Alliance and then Respect.

In February 2013, he was among those who gave their support to the People's Assembly in a letter published by The Guardian newspaper.

He attempted to vote in the 2015 Labour Leadership Election, but was among those who had their vote rejected by the party. In March 2016, he rejoined the Labour Party after being expelled from it over 25 years earlier. He wrote in The Huffington Post: "Jeremy [Corbyn] is the first Labour leader in a generation who unequivocally supports the unions and his opposition to the trade union bill has been crucial." He added "I have joined to support Jeremy in transforming the party. And I want as many people as possible to join Labour, and to get involved in the fight against cuts where they live. This is our chance to build a social movement and form a government that can offer hope to the millions of people that deserve so much better than these contemptible Tories."

== Personal life ==
Serwotka is married to Ruth Serwotka, co-founder of the organisation Woman's Place UK, an anti-transgender advocacy group.

In September 2010, Serwotka was named as one of the hundred most influential British Catholics by The Tablet.

In 2013 he was fitted with a battery-powered ventricular assist device after picking up a viral infection from the family dog. He was readmitted to hospital on 30 August 2016, when the ventricular assist device developed a clot and his doctors then placed him on the urgent transplant list. In December 2016 he had a heart transplant at Papworth Hospital in Cambridgeshire.

Trade union offices
Preceded by Barry Reamsbottom	General Secretary of the Public and Commercial Services Union; 2002–2024	Succeeded by Fran Heathcote
Preceded by Sally Hunt	President of the Trades Union Congress; 2018–2019	Succeeded by Ged Nichols
