= Esterman v NALGO =

- Court: Court of Appeal
- Citation: [1974] ICR 625

Keywords
- Trade union, collective bargaining

Esterman v NALGO [1974] ICR 625 is a UK labour law case, concerning trade union regulation.

== Facts ==
Miss Esterman was a senior legal assistant in Islington LBC. NALGO balloted members for a strike, to increase the London weighting. Of those who voted, 49% were in favour of selected strikes, and 48% were against, and 3% did not answer. It got the employer to agree but was vetoed by government under its counter-inflation policy. The union in Islington was instructed to do selective strikes, where 64% voted in favour. This was to boycott the elections in May 1974. Miss Esterman refused to comply with the instruction and was disciplined according to NALGO’s rules. She sought an interlocutory injunction to prevent expulsion.

== Judgment ==
Templeman J held that Miss Esterman could get an injunction against the disciplinary proceeding. It was ‘impossible to convict any member of NALGO of conduct which rendered him unfit to be a member... on the ground that the member did not comply with the instructions’ to not co-operate with the election. The union had to have clear authority in the rules, and the member must have no reason to question whether the instruction was lawful. There were doubts whether the union executive could ‘take the serious step of interfering’ with the member’s right to do work outside normal employment. Templeman J said a member ‘cannot be found guilty on that account of conduct which renders him unfit to be a member of NALGO.’ There could, however, be ‘special circumstances’ where a union member could disobey a lawful instruction.

== See also ==
- UK labour law
