= Hugh Lanning =

British pro-Palestinian activist

Hugh Lanning is a British pro-Palestinian activist and former trade union official. He was the Deputy General Secretary of the Public and Commercial Services Union (PCS), one of Britain's largest trade unions, until May 2013. He has been the Chairman of the Palestine Solidarity Campaign (PSC) since 2009, and in 2013 was named a vice chair of the group Unite Against Fascism (UAF).

In the 2015 general election, Hugh was the Labour candidate for the Canterbury constituency, in Kent. Despite not winning the seat, he did increase the Labour vote share and came second in the election results.

Lanning has played a major role in persuading trade unions in Britain to declare solidarity with the Palestinians and to support the BDS (Boycott, Divestment, and Sanctions) movement. During his tenure at PCS, Lanning was active in the effort to keep people he considered 'fascists' or 'racists' out of the union and out of union workplaces.

Lanning has given speeches at many labour and anti-racism rallies and has been a frequent contributor to the Morning Star, the daily newspaper of the Communist Party of Britain.

== Career ==
Lanning worked for the civil service trade unions for over 30 years, starting with the Civil Service Union and all the subsequent merged unions.” As Deputy Chairman of PCS, the UK's largest civil service trade union, he served on the National Trade Union Committee, and was responsible for negotiations with the Cabinet Office on jobs, pensions, and personnel management issues.

Lanning lost an election for General Secretary of PCS in 2000 to Mark Serwotka. His loss was widely described as unexpected. Lanning accepted the result and agreed to serve as Serwotka's deputy, but the incumbent General Secretary, Barry Reamsbottom, declared the result invalid and continued in office.

=== 2009 ===
Lanning was named chairman of the Palestine Solidarity Campaign (PSC) in 2009.

=== 2011 ===
During a U.S. visit in 2011, Lanning was the keynote speaker at the ninth annual convention of Al-Awda. His speech was entitled “The Role of Trade Unions and Solidarity Campaigns in the Struggle for the Liberation of Palestine.”

=== 2013 ===
Lanning resigned from his position with the PCS in May 2013.

In 2013, Lanning was elected a vice chair of Unite Against Fascism (UAF). He was a speaker at UAF's national conference in March 2013.

== Refusal of entry to Israel ==
In March 2017, days after the Knesset passed Amendment No. 28 to the Entry Into Israel Law, which allowed known supporters of the BDS movement to be banned from entering Israel, Lanning became the first British national to be refused entry to Israel under this law. After landing at Ben Gurion Airport, Lanning was detained and refused entry. He claimed he was interrogated for eight hours. He was subsequently put on a flight back to the UK and informed that he would need to apply for permission to enter Israel in the future.

== Book ==
Lanning and Richard Norton-Taylor wrote a 1992 book, A Conflict of Loyalties: GCHQ 1984–1991, about 14 employees of the UK Government Communications Headquarters (GCHQ) who refused to obey a new directive requiring that they resign from their unions. In a review for The Guardian, Lord Wedderburn called it “a valuable source for those who seek to understand the place of the GCHQ victimisations in the general and continuing assault upon trade union rights in Britain.”
