= Scottish Palestine Solidarity Campaign =

Political advocacy group in Scotland

- Formation: September 2000
- Type: Political organisation
- Purpose: Boycotts, political activism
- Chair: Sofiah MacLeod
- Website: https://www.scottishpsc.org.uk/

The Scottish Palestine Solidarity Campaign (SPSC) is a Scottish political organisation which campaigns in solidarity with the Palestinian people.

It supports the BDS Movement and its call for boycott, divestment and sanctions towards Israel until it ends the occupation of the Palestinian territories, acknowledges Palestinian refugees' right to return to their homes, and recognises the right of Palestinian-Arab citizens of Israel to full legal and political equality.

The organisation has successfully pressured Scottish cultural bodies to return sponsorship monies to the Israeli Embassy; one such success in 2009 led the United States Secretary of State Hillary Clinton to intervene clandestinely against the group.

Demonstrations in 2014 successfully forced Edinburgh Festival Fringe productions funded by the Israeli government to close. Campaigning against the Jewish National Fund led to a number of JNF fundraisers being cancelled.

== Current campaigns ==
The organisation is currently involved with others in a campaign called Time to Divest to pressure Scottish local councils to have their pension funds divest from armament and other companies that supply Israel or otherwise operate in support of Israel's illegal occupation of the West Bank.

== Structure ==
Scottish Palestine Solidarity Campaign was founded in Edinburgh during September 2000 at the start of the Second Palestinian Intifada. A handful of individuals operating as the Edinburgh Ad-hoc Committee on Palestine responded to the Palestinian Intifada and began to attract support by opposing the Israeli repression that followed and what it claimed was UK Government complicity in support of Israel. Independently of the London-based Palestine Solidarity Campaign, the group adopted the name of Scottish Palestine Solidarity Campaign on the suggestion of a member who had been active in the Vietnam Solidarity Campaign in the 1960s and 1970s.

The organisation has branches and members at large across Scotland. It was affiliated to London-based PSC for two years in 2009 and 2010 but ended its affiliation after PSC voted against boycotting the Israeli Histadrut trade union in 2009 and confirmed that position in 2010.

== Influence ==
In December 2004, SPSC launched a successful campaign to have Mordechai Vanunu elected as rector of the University of Glasgow. A spokesman for the Israeli Information Office in Scotland claimed that Vanunu had contributed information that led to a successful terrorist attack and the killing of three nuclear plant workers, a claim rejected by SPSC. The Scottish Council of Jewish Communities alleged that the Vanunu4Rector Campaign was guilty of antisemitism for reporting that Vanunu "has been assaulted by Jewish extremists" in Israel. They further claimed that an unnamed Vanunu supporter during the election had campaigned with the slogan, 'Jews are evil'.

Israeli daily Haaretz reported that "while similar boycott efforts also occur in England, there is a consensus that 'it's worse in Scotland.' One Israeli diplomat reported that "Every appearance by an official Israeli representative in Scotland is like a visit to enemy territory." "

Scottish Friends of Israel website thought that "...Scotland has witnessed a noticeable public anti-Israel sentiment, prominently driven by the Scottish Palestine Solidarity Campaign..." Ezra Golombok of the Israeli Information Office wrote that ", a highly active anti-Israeli lobby in Scotland"...the Palestine Solidarity Campaign "seems well-funded and its few activist leaders are knowledgeable, expert in exploiting any situation for sniping at Israel..." Golombok, Israeli Information Office, Scotland (2010)

== Antisemitism ==
The organisation has faced allegations of antisemitism from some critics, which it denies, stating that its activism targets Israeli government policy rather than Jewish people.

In 2014, the deputy leader of the Scottish Conservatives Jackson Carlaw put forward motion a motion condemning "the campaign by the Scottish Palestine Solidarity Campaign (SPSC) against the Stills Gallery in Edinburgh for accepting a donation from the Israeli embassy", claiming SPSC had "shown itself to be a thoroughly discredited organisation driven more by a hatred of Israel than a desire to support Palestinians".

Alex Massie of The Sunday Times called the group "a sewer" due to its antisemitism. An SPSC rebuttal article claimed its entire corpus was free of any taint of antisemitism. In 2017, Labour MP John Mann called for action against "racists" following a report by pro-Israel blogger David Collier which cited links between the SPSC and antisemitism within Scotland, and further that there was a link between anti-Israel attitudes and antisemitism. A Jewish businessman claimed in 2017 he was hounded by campaigners associated with the group, a claim the organisation disputes.

In 2020, Glasgow lawyer Matthew Berlow was fined by the Law Society of Scotland after staging a fake antisemitic incident at his home and using a false social media account that falsely implicated the SPSC.

In May 2026, the group posted an image of Maureen Lipman with devil horns and a pitchfork, alleging the actress had a "long record of harmful statements about Muslims, Palestinians and Palestinian rights". This was part of the group's petition calling for the cancellation of Lipman's performance in Allegra at Aberdeen. The Campaign Against Antisemitism condemned the depiction as antisemitic.
