= Barry Reamsbottom =

Barry Arthur Reamsbottom (born 4 April 1949) is a Scottish former civil servant and trade union General Secretary. He was General Secretary of the Civil and Public Services Association (1992–1998) and its successor the Public and Commercial Services Union (1998–2002).

== Biography ==
Reamsbottom is from Aberdeen and lived in a children's home run by Catholic nuns, Nazareth House, from the age of 7 to 14. He started his career in the DHSS in Aberdeen, before becoming a full-time trade union employee, eventually Press Officer for the CPSA from 1987 to 1992.

Reamsbottom was elected General Secretary of CPSA on the Moderate ticket. In 1998, he oversaw the merger of CPSA and the Public Services, Tax and Commerce Union (PTC) to form the Public and Commercial Services Union (PCS) which included in the agreement that he could continue as General Secretary until 2004. However, in a union members vote, 97% ordered a fresh election. After only securing 32 out of 50 nominations required, Reamsbottom decided not to stand for re-election on the proviso he stood down in 2002, but continued to be paid until 2004.

Reamsbottom's preferred candidate for General Secretary of PCS, Hugh Lanning, then lost the 2000 election to a left-wing candidate, Mark Serwotka. Lanning accepted the result, but Reamsbottom, rather than retire as agreed in 2002, instead continued in the post claiming the election had been invalid. At a meeting of the Moderate-dominated executive in May 2002, a motion was carried reversing the election of Serwotka. Reamsbottom said afterwards, "I have been through a hard school... I would rather go out in a box". Serwotka took office in June, but Reamsbottom and the new General Secretary proceeded to countermand one another, with Reamsbottom ordering Serwotka's staff and secretary to stop working for him. In late 2002, a High Court judge confirmed the election had been carried out properly and Reamsbottom had no further claim to the office.

Reamsbottom became Vice President of the NATO-sponsored think tank, the Trade Union Committee for European and Transatlantic Understanding.

Trade union offices
Preceded by John Ellis	General Secretary of the Civil and Public Services Association; 1992 – 1998	Succeeded by Position abolished
Preceded by New position	General Secretary of the Public and Commercial Services Union; 1998 – 2002; With: John Sheldon (1998 – 2000)	Succeeded by Mark Serwotka
