= Trade unions in the United Kingdom =

- National organization(s): TUC, STUC, ICTU
- Regulatory authority: Department for Business and Trade; Northern Ireland Department for the Economy
- Primary legislation: Trade Union and Labour Relations (Consolidation) Act 1992
- Total union membership: 6.6 million (2025)
- Percentage of workforce unionised: 22% (2025)

International Labour Organization
- The UK is a member of the ILO

Convention ratification
- Freedom of Association: 27 June 1949
- Right to Organise: 30 June 1950

In the United Kingdom, trade unions emerged in the early 19th century, but faced punitive laws that sharply limited their activities. They began political activity in the late 19th century and formed an alliance with the Liberal Party in the early 20th century. They grew rapidly from 1900 to 1920, lost their legal disabilities, and were well established by the 1920s. Union members largely switched from Liberal to the new Labour Party. Its leader Ramsay MacDonald became prime minister in 1924 briefly, and then again in 1929. In the 1980s Margaret Thatcher's Conservative governments weakened the powers of the unions by making it more difficult to strike legally.

Most British unions are members of the TUC, the Trades Union Congress (founded in 1867), or where appropriate, the Scottish Trades Union Congress or the Irish Congress of Trade Unions, which are the country's principal national trade union centres.

== History ==
Trade unions in the United Kingdom were first decriminalised under the recommendation of a Royal commission in 1867, which agreed that the establishment of the organisations was to the advantage of both employers and employees. Legalised in 1871, the Trade Union Movement sought to reform socio-economic conditions for working men in British industries, and the trade unions' search for this led to the creation of a Labour Representation Committee which effectively formed the basis for today's Labour Party, which still has extensive links with the Trade Union Movement in Britain.

Margaret Thatcher's Conservative government, first elected in 1979, saw trade unions as an obstacle to economic growth and passed legislation of the sort the Conservatives had mostly long avoided.

As factories closed, membership declined steeply in the 1980s and 1990s, falling from 13 million in 1979 to around 7.3 million in 2000. In September 2012 union membership dropped below 6 million for the first time since the 1940s. Union membership declined in parallel with the reduction in size of many traditional industries which had been highly unionised, such as steel, coal, printing, and the docks.

In 2016, the Conservative government passed a new Trade Union Act, which proposes stricter ballot thresholds for industrial action, further restraints on picketing and a requirement that union members contributions to political funds would only be via an 'opt-in'.

Union membership has since begun rising gradually again, reaching 6.6 million in 2025. The Employment Rights Act 2025, introduced by the Labour government, strengthened union rights. It repealed many parts of the 2016 Trade Union Act, strengthened protections against unfair dismissal for engaging in legal strike action. As of 2026, no date was set for when the repeal of the minimum 50% turnout for strike action would come into force, or when electronic voting would be allowed.

== Law ==
Much like corporations, trade unions were regarded as criminal until the Combination Act 1825, and were regarded as quasi-legal organisations, subjected to the restraint of trade doctrine, until the Trade Union Act 1871. This Act abolished common-law restrictions, but took an abstentionist stance to unions' internal affairs. The Trade Disputes Act 1906 exempted trade-union funds from liability in action for damages for torts, and this freedom gave future union pickets a great deal of power.

=== Democratic organisation ===
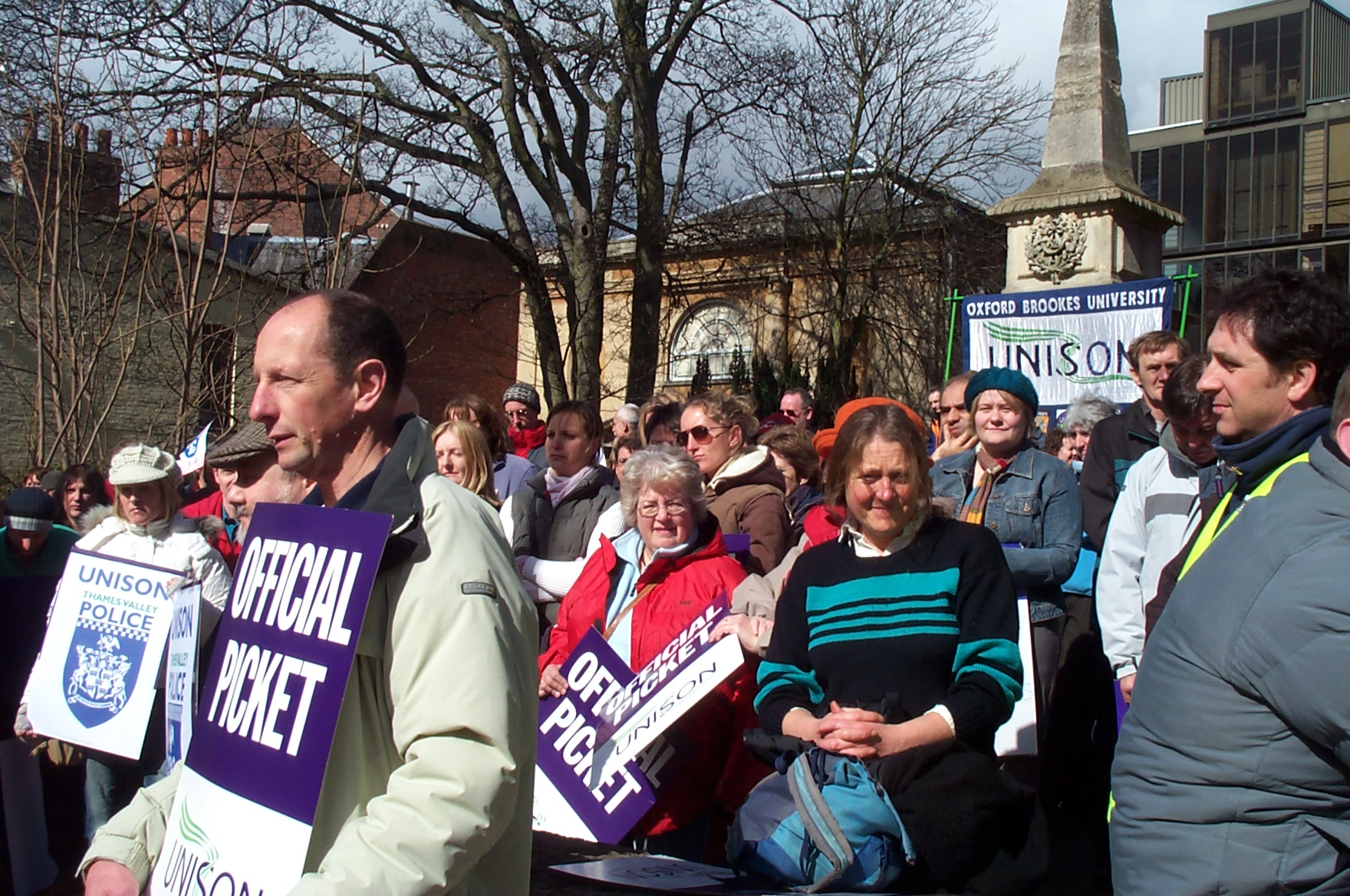
2006 rally by Unison, the largest trade union in the United Kingdom

The principle that the common law enforced a union's own rules, and that unions were free to arrange their affairs, is reflected in the ILO Freedom of Association Convention and in Article 11 of the European Convention on Human Rights, subject to the requirement that regulations "necessary in a democratic society" may be imposed. Unions must have an executive body and that executive must, under the Trade Union and Labour Relations (Consolidation) Act 1992 sections 46 to 56, be elected at least every five years, directly in a secret, equal postal vote of union members.

=== Union constitutions ===
The structure of the unions was based in contract, and the rights of members depended on being able to show some proprietary interest to be specifically enforced. This meant that the express terms of the union rule book can, like any contract, be supplemented with implied terms by the courts as strictly necessary to reflect the reasonable expectations of the parties, for instance, by implying the Electoral Reform Service's guidance to say what happens in a tie break situation during an election when the union rules are silent. If there are irregular occurrences in the affairs of the union, for instance if negligence or mismanagement is not alleged and a majority could vote on the issue to forgive them, then members have no individual rights to contest executive decision making. However, if a union's leadership acts ultra vires, beyond its powers set out in the union constitution, if the alleged wrongdoers are in control, if a special supra-majority procedure is flouted, or a member's personal right is broken, the members may bring a derivative claim in court to sue or restrain the executive members. So in Edwards v Halliwell a decision of the executive committee of the National Union of Vehicle Builders to increase membership fees, which were set in the constitution and required a two-thirds majority vote, was able to be restrained by a claim from individual members because this touched both a personal right under the constitution and flouted a special procedure.

=== Discipline and expulsion ===
- ASLEF v United Kingdom [2007] ECHR 184
- McVitae v UNISON [1996] IRLR 33
- Roebuck v NUM (Yorkshire Area) No 2 [1978] ICR 676, Templeman J
- Esterman v NALGO [1974] ICR 625, Templeman J
- Radford v NATSOPA [1972] ICR 484, Plowman J

=== Dispute resolution ===
- Hamlet v GMBATU [1987] ICR 150, Harman J
- Longley v NUJ [1987] IRLR 109

=== Union members' rights ===
- Trade Union and Labour Relations (Consolidation) Act 1992 ss 28–31, true and fair view of accounts, member's right to inspect, and complaints to Certification Officer.
- Trade Union and Labour Relations (Consolidation) Act 1992 ss 62–65, right to require a ballot before industrial action, and no detriment may follow
- Knowles v Fire Brigades Union [1997] ICR 595
- Edwards v Society of Graphical and Allied Trades [1971] Ch 354
- Cheall v APEX [1983] 2 AC 180
- Trade Union and Labour Relations (Consolidation) Act 1992 s 174
- ASLEF v United Kingdom [2007] ECHR 184
- Amalgamated Society of Railway Servants v Osborne [1910] AC 87, political donations
- Trade Union Act 1913
- Birch v National Union of Railwaymen [1950] Ch 602
- Trade Union and Labour Relations (Consolidation) Act 1992 s 72–73 and 82
- Paul v NALGO [1987] IRLR 413
- Weaver v NATFHE [1988] ICR 599 EAT

== Structure and major unions ==
Largest trade unions in 2023/24
Union	Members
UNISON	1,403,792
Unite	1,177,292
GMB	576,463
Royal College of Nursing	570,656
National Education Union	487,420
Union of Shop, Distributive and Allied Workers	360,394
NASUWT	285,963
Public and Commercial Services Union	189,399
British Medical Association	170,633
Communication Workers Union	170,324
Prospect	156,904
University and College Union	119,785
Other Unions	1,030,675

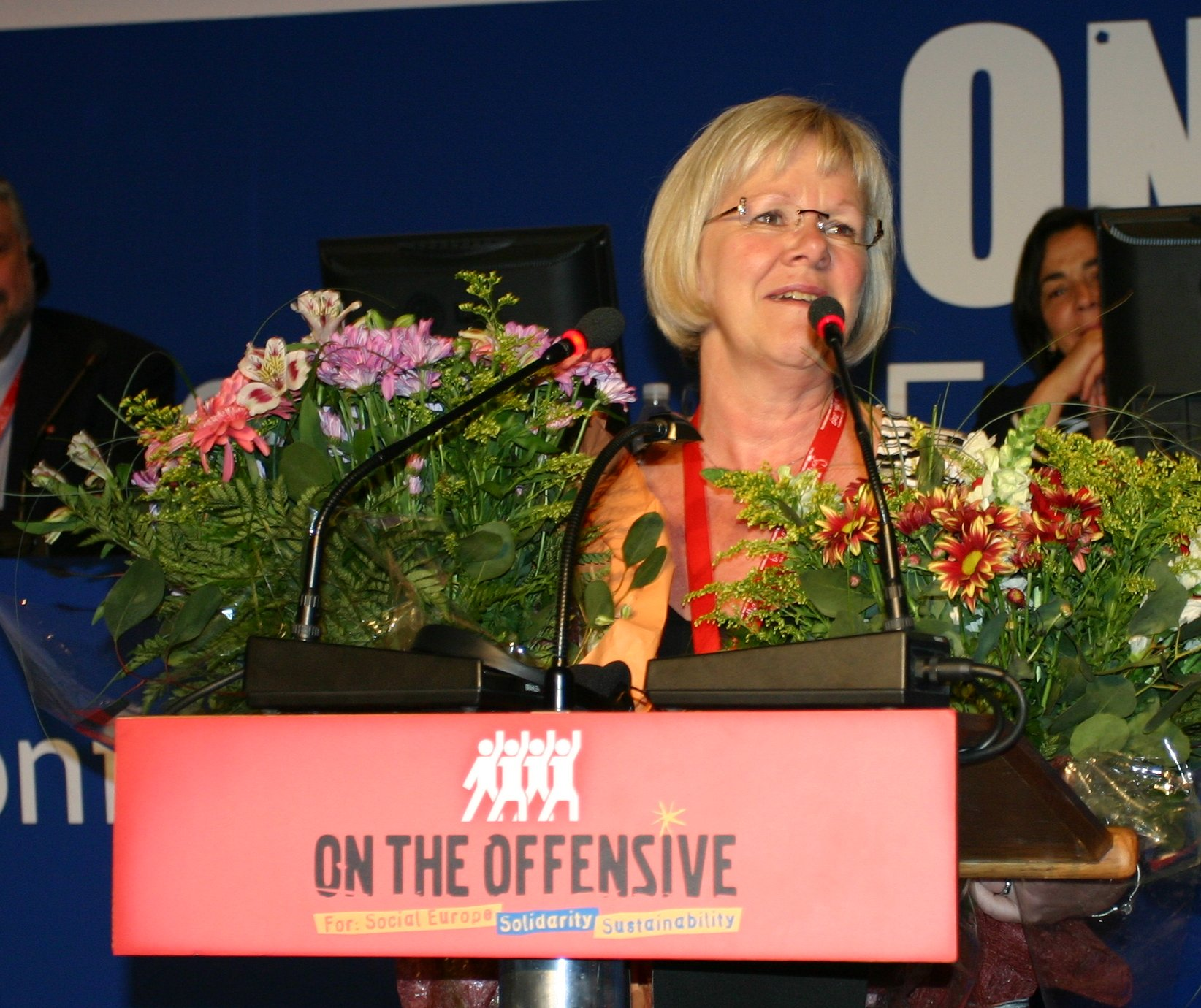
The ETUC, headed by Wanja Lundby-Wedin until May 2011, is the union federation for 37 European countries, the counterpart for the TUC of the UK and the ITUC internationally.

=== International affiliations ===
- European Trade Union Confederation
- International Trade Union Confederation

== See also ==
- Conspiracy and Protection of Property Act 1875
- Criminal Law Amendment Act 1871
- Employers and Workmen Act 1875
- GCHQ trade union ban
- History of the socialist movement in the United Kingdom
- History of trade unions in the United Kingdom
- Labour Party (UK) affiliated trade union
- List of trade unions in the United Kingdom
- Strikes (Minimum Service Levels) Act 2023
- Student unionism in the United Kingdom
- Trade Union and Labour Party Liaison Organisation
- Trade Union Freedom Bill
- Trade Unionist and Socialist Coalition
- Trades Union Certification Officer
- Union Modernisation Fund
- United Voices of the World
