= United Voices of the World =

Independent grassroots trade union in United Kingdom

- Abbreviation: UVW
- Founded: 6 January 2014; 12 years ago
- Headquarters: 144 Cambridge Heath Road, Bethnal Green, London, England, United Kingdom
- Location: United Kingdom
- Members: ▲4,446 (2025)
- General Secretary: Petros Elia
- Website: www.uvwunion.org.uk

United Voices of the World (UVW) is an independent grassroots trade union in the United Kingdom established in London in 2014.

Members of the union are mainly those in insecure work, such as low-wage workers in the 'gig economy' and outsourced industries. The union represents those working as cleaners, carers, couriers, bar staff, security guards, architects, designers, and charity workers. The UVW has a strong association with the Latin American community, with many members being immigrant workers from Latin America.

The UVW is seen as being much quicker to call strike and as more confrontational toward employers than larger and more traditional unions in the UK. Demonstrations held by the UVW are known for having a celebratory atmosphere.

While not affiliated to either the Trades Union Congress, or the Labour Party, the union has coordinated both with traditional unions, and other independent unions such as the Independent Workers' Union of Great Britain, and the Industrial Workers of the World.

== Formation ==
The United Voices of the World union was founded on 6 January 2014.

== Membership ==
UVW membership
year	members
2014	153
2015	124
2016	300
2017	819
2018	1,200
2019	3,510
2020	3,669
2021	3,696
2022	3,898
2023	3,521
Numbers represent memberships on last day of year, as reported to the Trades Union Certification Officer.

The UVW's members are typically employed in insecure and precarious low-wage employment, such as those working in the 'gig economy' and those working at outsourcing companies.

The UVW consists of cleaners, carers, couriers, bar staff and security guards, as well as architects, designers/cultural workers, and workers from domestic/sexual violence organisations.

The membership of the union is largely made up of immigrant workers within places like London. Most of the UVW's members are originally from Latin America, with many being fluent speakers of Spanish and Portuguese. As of 2018, approximately 90% of the unions' membership were workers who had immigrated from Latin america, as well as from Africa and the West Indies.

The UVW hosts English language classes to improve its members English proficiency.

United Voices of the World supports sex workers' rights and states that it "fights for sex workers to get fair wages, sick pay and dignity".

== Campaigning style ==
If you don't have a good network of motivated workers or supporters ready to take direct action then you won't defend striking workers. One of the things UVW and IWGB offer workers, besides prospects of winning real gains, is a sense of community ... that is a large part of the reason why workers join and stay.

— Petros Elia, quoted in "Precarious Workers are Organising – Trade Unions Need to Catch Up", OpenDemocracy

UVW in early years represented small groups of workers in disputes with global brands such as Sotheby's and Topshop, taking a radical, often experimental approach to organising precarious and migrant workers who felt shunned and under-served by established unions. More recently, UVW has been able to recruit larger numbers of members in workplaces such as hospitals and universities.

The UVW is distinguished from larger conventional trade unions in the UK by its more confrontational attitude. The union is quicker than traditional unions to call strikes, with its strikes often involving short work stoppages of several hundred employees that take place alongside protests designed to generate interest and exert public pressure on an employer. The union also does not pursue recognition agreements with employers, instead relying on higher-pressure strategies to bring bosses to negotiate.

Campaigns are characterised by noisy and disruptive pickets and protests, embracing diverse groups and the use of social media to attract further support. Demonstrations often have a party-like and celebratory atmosphere.

The UVW encourages collective self-relliance, with members listing their own griviences as well as planning and running their own campaigns autonomously. Instead of taking a leading role, UVW officials support and facilitate these member-led campaigns.

In 2019, UVW launched Legal Sector Workers United (LSWU), an initiative supported by Michael Mansfield.

== Allied organisations ==
The UVW operates as a part of an informal network of organisations within the autonomous left. The UVW cooperates with fellow independent unions such as the Independent Workers' Union of Great Britain, and the Industrial Workers of the World, as well as with organisers from the London Renters Union, Women's Strike and Disabled People Against Cuts, the various Justice4Cleaners groups in universities and activists from groups such as Class War.

In 2021, Black Lives Matter UK awarded a grant of £15,000 to UVW. In 2020, the Rosa Luxemburg Foundation granted UVW the funds to employ two full-time organisers to unionise the private childcare sector. Later in 2021, The Rosa Luxembourg Foundation coordinated the move of its offices, and other left-wing organisations including UVW, to an office block in East London.

== Picket arrest of Franck Magennis ==
Franck Magennis, a barrister then working for UVW as Head of Legal, was attending a peaceful picket with striking security guards outside St. George's medical school on the morning of January 13th 2020. A dozen Met police officers presented the crowd with a letter from St. George's requesting that they move the picket, and claimed that the picket was "an illegal nuisance on NHS property". As Magennis questioned that assertion, he was handcuffed and then released minutes later on the condition that he leave the area immediately.

The picket then dispersed, but returned the following morning and proceeded without resistance. In July 2020, a crowdfunder was launched to cover initial costs of legal action against the Met Police. Magennis and UVW claim the arrest was unlawful and an attempt to intimidate a legal picket.

== Covid-19 pandemic ==
During the COVID-19 pandemic, whilst many civil servants were told to work from home and isolate, the cleaners of civil service offices were classified as essential workers, and instructed to keep cleaning the central London offices. In April 2020, the UVW wrote to the Ministry of Justice and the cleaning company OCS, warning that workers were coming into work sick as they were unable to afford being on the lower statutory sick pay.

Emanuel Gomes, a cleaner and UVW member from Guinea Bissau, died on 24 April 2020 five hours after finishing a night shift at the Ministry of Justice. He had been sick for five days but continued to clean the deserted offices despite his agency bosses and all civil servants being absent. Emanuel's employer, OCS, had been unresponsive to safety concerns despite informing the cleaners that they were "essential workers" during the pandemic.

St. George's medical school, where UVW has been campaigning with security guards employed by Bidvest Noonan, announced in July 2020 that the guards would be entitled to 3 weeks of full sick pay, and full pay during self-isolation after a positive test result. Some security guards had previously walked off the job in protest of non-essential duties and visitors at a time when most students and management were self-isolating, and the lack of provision of PPE.

The 2022 Sue Gray report on the Partygate scandal said that government cleaners and security guards received a “lack of respect and poor treatment”.

== Campaigns at hospitals ==
=== St. Mary's NHS Hospital ===
Cleaners, porters and caterers at St. Mary's (and four other London hospitals managed by Imperial College Healthcare NHS Trust) were employed by Sodexo on the minimum wage (£8.21), significantly less than they would earn on corresponding NHS pay bands. They were also denied the sick pay, maternity pay, annual leave and pensions enjoyed by NHS staff.

In the final months of 2019, over 100 Sodexo workers at St. Mary's joined UVW. In total 10 days of strike action took place from late October to late November, then plans to strike in December were cancelled as Tom Orchard, CEO of Imperial NHS Trust, committed to negotiations to be concluded in January 2020. As Sodexo's contract was coming to an end, and with UVW threatening an "all-out" indefinite strike, it was announced at the end of January that over 1,000 Sodexo workers in five hospitals would be in-housed as NHS employees from April 2020.

=== Great Ormond Street NHS Hospital ===
In the aftermath of the successful St. Mary's campaign, around 100 predominantly cleaners at GOSH employed by OCS joined UVW demanding to be in-housed as NHS employees. As with the Sodexo workers at St. Mary's Hospital, their contractual terms were significantly inferior to those of equivalent positions in the NHS.

Throughout 2020, the GOSH NHS Trust had refused to meet with the cleaners and UVW prepared to issue a strike ballot in November. UVW had also submitted a 45-page legal claim against outsourcing at GOSH, and threatened to include the Trust in a test case of alleged racial discrimination in breach of the Equality Act 2010. Petros Elia, an organiser of the campaign, wrote: "Most of these workers are Black, Brown, Asian and migrant and are deeply unhappy with a situation which sees them consciously paid less than their White in-house colleagues of a similar grade and denied NHS T&Cs such as full pay sick pay." A Freedom of Information (FoI) request by UVW revealed that GOSH held no records of any Equality Impact Assessment relating to its decision to outsource domestic services, which as part of its Public Sector Equality Duty and considering the clear racial aspect of the decision, it should have been very reasonably expected to undertake.

In December 2020, the GOSH NHS Trust announced that when OCS's services contract ends in mid-2021, some 200 OCS staff at GOSH would be offered NHS contracts. By September 2021, despite improvements in pay, sick pay and pension entitlements, the workers were still lacking the annual leave, maternity/paternity, and redundancy rights afforded to other NHS employees. With 120 cleaners again threatening to go on strike, GOSH pledged full equality in terms and conditions with NHS staff.

In December 2021, GOSH security guards employed by Carlisle Support Services went on strike for 3 days over the lack of sick pay, pension contributions, maternity pay, and other benefits enjoyed by all NHS staff. A six-week strike was planned for February/March 2002, but by mid-February an interim court injunction was preventing loud protests from occurring within 200 metres of the hospital. Jeremy Corbyn, who had attended a pre-injunction rally outside the hospital, demanded that GOSH bosses “stop wasting money on going to court, and negotiate.”

== Campaigns at universities and schools ==
=== London School of Economics ===
In late 2016, contested dismissals of cleaners employed by Noonan Services at the London School of Economics (LSE) escalated into a full-scale dispute for equality of rights to match those of LSE's in-house staff. Dozens of cleaners, all of ethnic minorities, faced significant disparities in paid annual leave, sick pay, paternity/maternity pay, and pension contributions when compared to LSE employees. They wore uniforms inscribed with both the name of the university and their employer, but had been instructed by Noonan's management to change out of uniform before using the university's fourth-floor cafeteria. They were subsequently assured by LSE management that the cafeteria was open to all customers, though the cleaners typically brought their own food and drink (and therefore would not be customers). Unlike in-house staff, had no common room or kitchen space to make use of.

Large campus protests and weekly strikes were organised by UVW in the summer of 2017, attracting much student support despite coinciding with the exam period. It was announced in June 2017, after a 10-month campaign, that around 200 outsourced workers at the LSE would be offered in-house contracts.

=== University of Greenwich ===
Cafe workers serving the main lobby of Greenwich university joined UVW complaining of low pay, overworking and insufficient sick pay. They were all employees of Baxterstorey, which had been contracted to run the cafeteria. One chef working 80 hours a week had collapsed shortly after a typical day in intense kitchen heat, but returned to work the next morning because he couldn't afford to skip a single shift. All of his colleagues were to become UVW members, and as they announced their campaign, Baxterstorey immediately raised their pay by 50p to £9.75 an hour.

Demanding the full London Living Wage of £10.55 as well as improved sick pay and annual leave, the workers went on strike for four days in October 2019. Protests interrupted the annual graduation ceremony and a top-level university board meeting, calling on students and staff to boycott the cafeteria. With more strikes and protests planned, it was announced in early January 2020 that all outsourced cafe workers, cleaners and security guards at the university would receive the London Living Wage, in addition to the same sick pay and annual leave as equivalent in-house staff.

=== La Retraite Roman Catholic Girls' School ===
Cleaners at La Retraite school, employed by Ecocleen, started joining UVW in late 2020. They were assured they could lawfully walk off the job in December, citing concerns with the school's response to Covid-19, which had led to several cleaners falling ill. After 4 weeks they resumed work, but their wages for that period were withheld. They had been promised a wage increase from £8.75 per hour, but with no confirmation about when the higher rate would be paid. Their work was also proposed to be reduced from 46 to 43 weeks of the year, and they were not entitled to sick pay beyond the statutory minimum.

In March 2021, a "40 days and 40 nights" strike commenced and was called off after 2 days as the school conceded to UVW demands, including the backdated Living Wage of £10.85 per hour and sick pay in line with the school's in-house staff.

=== Ark Globe Academy ===
The Ark Globe Academy in Southwark, London outsourced its maintenance operations to Ridge Crest Cleaning, who paid the cleaners the minimum wage (£8.72) with no occupational sick pay. Repeated instances of unpaid work led to a spontaneous walkout on 4 and 5 June 2020, after which Ridge Crest paid all outstanding wages. Other demands included the provision of Personal Protective Equipment (PPE) in the face of Covid-19, and audio was then recorded from a telephone call where Emma Nabola, manager at Ridge Crest, repeatedly implied that PPE and improved pay would be contingent upon the cleaners ceasing their union activities.

Simon Wrenn, managing director at Ridge Crest, announced in a letter dated 16 July that from the beginning of September term, cleaners would be paid the London Living Wage of £10.75 and sick pay in parity with Ark Globe Academy staff. UVW then confirmed plans to file a collective tribunal claim against Ridge Crest for trade union victimisation.

== Other notable campaigns ==
=== Harrods ===
Over 450 kitchen and waiting staff at the 16 restaurants and cafes within Harrods were being kept in the dark about the total proceeds of a discretionary 12.5% service charge added to bills. They received only an unspecified percentage of the total, which while not rare in the hospitality industry, was particularly controversial given Harrods' profitability and the wealth of its Qatari owners. It was reported that Harrods management had told staff in a meeting that 50% of the total was retained by the company as revenue, though many believed the true figure to be as high as 75%, which would have resulted in each employee losing out on £5,000 per year.

During early January sales in 2017, a contingent organised by UVW including Harrods employees staged a surprise protest and roadblock along the Brompton Road storefront. A large inflatable cube read "Stop Stealing Our Tips" while a red flare was lit, entrances were locked, two arrests were made, and more than two dozen police frustrated the protestors for several hours. Harrods announced on 20 January that "an improved tronc system" would be introduced to guarantee that 100% of service charges go to employees.

In 2021, kitchen and waiting staff demanding higher pay were organising as UVW members for strike action ahead of the Christmas shopping season. A substantial raise to at least £11.90 per hour, and at least of £12.50 for chefs, was agreed in early December.

=== The Daily Mail Group ===
In 2018, the Northcliffe House offices of the Daily Mail Group (DMG) were being cleaned by migrants from the Caribbean, Africa and Latin America on the minimum wage (£7.50). Mitie, the contractor employing the cleaners, allegedly threatened the cleaners not to strike, and would not confirm whether they had initiated a "redundancy process for its Northcliffe House cleaners as recently as February, off the back of demands from DMG to decrease the cost of the contract". A Change.org petition in support of the cleaners' demand for the London Living Wage attracted over 100,000 signatures. Refusing to voluntarily recognise UVW as the cleaners' trade union, and facing strikes and protests, DMG issued a statement claiming that Mitie had "some time ago" approved pay increases for the cleaners. Mitie confirmed that "our teams working at DMG ... have been informed of a pay increase to at least, and in some cases, beyond the London Living Wage."

=== The Royal Parks ===
Around 50 attendants who maintain the seven Royal Parks in central London, mostly from Ghana, Nigeria and Sierra Leone were being paid the minimum wage (£8.21) by their employer, Vinci Facilities. After two strike days in October 2019 and threats of further strikes, the board of Royal Parks agreed to raise wages of Vinci staff to the London Living Wage of £10.75 backdated to 1 November 2019. However, disparities remained in relation to Royal Parks in-house staff's sick pay and entitlements to annual leave, pension, overtime, on-call allowance, redundancy pay and maternity pay.

15 of the attendants have filed a claim of "indirect race discrimination" against Royal Parks at the Central London Employment Tribunal. It will be a test case to "force employers to think more carefully before they operate a two-tier system which disadvantages migrant labour," while also claiming damages, back pay and pension contributions valued at £750,000.

In April 2021, Royal Parks attendants were again balloted for strike action over significant contractual disparities with in-house staff, and unpaid holiday allowances.

=== Topshop ===
Susana Benavides, a Latin American cleaner employed by Britannia Services Group to clean Topshop's flagship store on London's Oxford Street, was represented for several years by UVW in her fight for dignified treatment and the London Living Wage. She had suffered depression resulting from an ongoing series of bullying incidents. In May 2016, two hundred protestors were joined by Shadow Chancellor John McDonnell MP in a show of solidarity for Susana, and hundreds of leaflets were placed in the pockets of clothing items. An online petition supporting Susana attracted over 35,000 signatures. She and her colleague Carolina were suspended and then sacked.

A 2019 ruling secured by Cloisters barrister Akua Reindorf in Susana's successful claim against Britannia found it to be clear “beyond any argument” that Susana was dismissed for engaging in legitimate trade union activities.

=== Sotheby's ===
Cleaners and porters at Sotheby's New Bond Street auction house were employed by Contract Cleaning and Maintenance (London) Limited (CCML), who conceded several demands after UVW initiated a formal dispute and 24 MPs signed an Early Day Motion condemning a litany of "poor employment practices". Sotheby's then terminated their contract with CCML and brought in Servest, taking UVW's dispute back to square one.

A surprise protest on 1 July 2015 sought to disrupt a major auction night including contemporary art by Andy Warhol and Francis Bacon. Four of the workers involved were denied access the following morning, and suspended indefinitely, after CCTV allegedly captured protestors spraying water pistols at clients. Two were later reinstated while the other two were dismissed. Sotheby's Battersea classic car auction in September was disrupted by another UVW protest. In February 2016 it was announced that Sotheby's and Servest had reached an agreement to pay all outsourced workers the London Living Wage and improved sick pay.

=== Royal Borough of Kensington and Chelsea ===
Cleaners working for Kensington and Chelsea council, principally at the town hall, were employed by Amey via a £150m 10-year "Tri-borough" services contract. Amey paid them the minimum wage of £7.83 per hour, and provided no sick pay beyond the statutory minimum, which paid nothing for the first three days of absence, and only a heavily reduced wage thereafter. In May 2018 a group of cleaners represented by UVW demanded the London Living Wage (LLW) of £10.20 per hour, and in August coordinated a joint strike with cleaners at the Ministry of Justice, supported by the then MP for Kensington, Emma Dent-Coad. On the first of three planned strike days, RBKC issued two mixed messages within a few hours, the first apparently committing to bringing the cleaners in-house, and the second merely promising a review of Amey's contract. The striking cleaners burst into a council meeting later that afternoon, securing an agreement from council members to engage with cleaners on the picket line the following morning.

A statement by the council's chief executive Barry Quirk the following day confirmed that "all options" were being considered in order to deliver the cleaners' wage demands, including ending Amey's contract and bringing the cleaners in-house. In September, the council fully committed to paying the LLW as of January 2019, with council leader Elizabeth Campbell further promising to try and secure backdated payment of the LLW from October 2018 onwards.

=== Orion Waste Management ===
Peruvian employees at Orion's industrial recycling plant in East London walked off the job in March 2018. They had been sorting construction waste in unsafe and dusty conditions, with insufficient personal protection and a lack of basic facilities. Along with UVW staff and supporters, they confronted the general manager and laid out demands including the London Living Wage, contractual sick pay, slower working, new face masks, soap, toilet paper, a shower room, and a decent supply of gloves, uniforms and hard hats. Many of the requested items were ordered the same day, and the workers were promised full pay until they resumed work, as well as board-level consideration of wage and contractual demands.

=== 100 Wood Street ===
The 100 Wood Street offices in the City of London, designed by Norman Foster, were cleaned by Latin American migrants employed by Thames Cleaning & Support Services. Demanding a raise to the London Living Wage, and the reinstatement of several colleagues after a cost-cutting restructure in early 2016, a group of cleaners commenced an "indefinite strike" and daily picket. After 52 consecutive days, a record for any strike in the City of London, a confidential agreement was reached that secured the Living Wage and a promise to "resolve other issues".

== Office break-ins ==
In 2025, the UVW's office was targeted by a burglary which saw the theft of union laptops, harming the UVW's ability to support its members. The UVW stated it believed the burglary could be an act of corporate sabotage against the union, as no other organisation in the building was targeted.

== Media documentaries ==
=== 2014 documentary ===
In 2014, the UVW campaign to secure the London Living Wage for migrant cleaners at the Barbican Centre became subject of a 25-minute documentary, Waging a Living in London (2014).

=== 2020 documentary ===
Filmmaker Hazel Falck secured funding for a short documentary about UVW after her pitch won a contest judged by the Joseph Rowntree Foundation at Sheffield Doc/Fest 2019. Contestants were asked to pitch films that would "explore the nature and impact of poverty in the UK, in a way that can ... shift attitudes towards some of the most marginalised people and communities."

Shooting of the film coincided with the duration of UVW's campaign at St. Mary's Hospital, and concluded shortly before Covid-19 lockdown would have prohibited further filming. Released for public viewing on the Guardian website in August 2020, United Voices centres on migrant women leading the St. Mary's effort to organise for strike action.

== See also ==
- Trade unions in the United Kingdom
- General unionism
- Industrial unionism
- United Sex Workers
