= 2024 New Year Honours =

British royal recognitions

The 2024 New Year Honours are appointments by some of the 15 Commonwealth realms to various orders and honours to recognise and reward good works by citizens of those countries. The New Year Honours are awarded as part of the New Year celebrations at the start of January and those for 2024 were announced on 29 December 2023, on the same day as the 2022 Prime Minister's Resignation Honours.

The recipients of honours are displayed as they were styled before their new honour and arranged by the country whose ministers advised Charles III on the appointments, then by the honour and by the honour's grade (i.e. Knight/Dame Grand Cross, Knight/Dame Commander, etc.), and then by divisions (i.e. Civil, Diplomatic, and Military), as appropriate.

The BBC reported that it had already received press releases from some recipients before the honours list was published, contrary to the "longstanding practice of modest secrecy ahead of the announcement, even though award winners will have known for weeks".

== United Kingdom ==
Below are the individuals appointed by Charles III in his right as King of the United Kingdom with honours within his own gift and with the advice of the Government for other honours.

=== The Order of the Companions of Honour ===
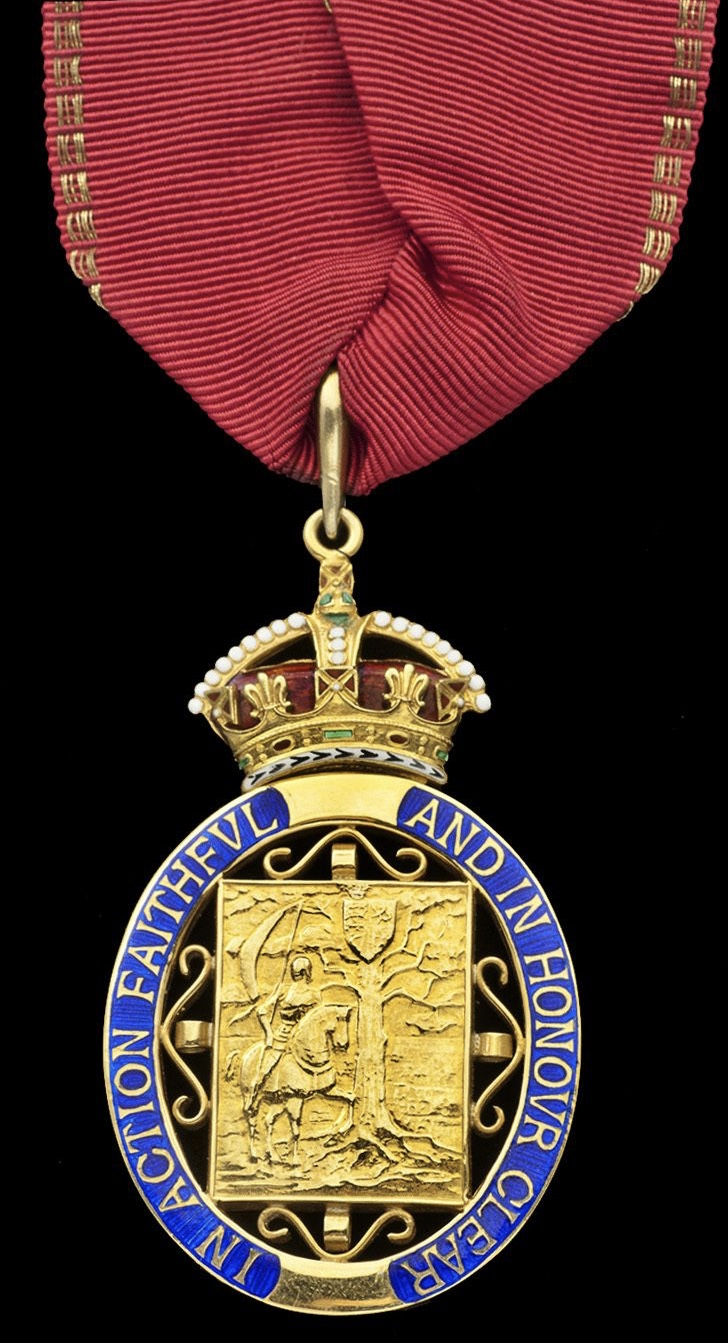
Riband and badge of a Member of the Order of the Companions of Honour

==== Member of the Order of Companions of Honour (CH) ====
- Dame Shirley Veronica Bassey DBE, Singer. For services to Music.

=== Knight Bachelor ===
- Brian Clarke, Artist. For services to Art.
- Ronald Dennis, CBE, Chair, Podium Analytics and Patron, Tommy's Campaign. For services to Industry and to Charity.
- Gregory Doran, lately Artistic Director, Royal Shakespeare Company. For services to the Arts.
- Athelstan Joseph Michael Eavis, CBE, Founder and Leader, Glastonbury Festival. For services to Music and to Charity.
- Professor William John Edmunds, OBE, FMedSci, Professor, Faculty of Epidemiology and Population Health, London School of Hygiene and Tropical Medicine. For services to Epidemiology.
- John Patrick Griffin, Founder, Addison Lee. For services to Business and to Charity.
- Stephen Alan Michael Hester, Chair, Easyjet and Chair, Nordea. For services to Business and to the Economy.
- David Charles Holmes, CBE, Chief Executive Officer, Family Action. For services to Children and Families.
- Professor Amritpal Singh Hungin, OBE, DL, Emeritus Professor of General Practice, Newcastle University. For services to Medicine.
- Professor John Peter Iredale, FMedSci, FRSE, lately Interim Executive Chair, Medical Research Council. For services to Medical Research.
- The Right Honourable Sajid Javid, MP, Member of Parliament for Bromsgrove. For Political and Public Service.
- Timothy Randall Martin, Founder and Chair, Wetherspoons. For services to Hospitality and to Culture.
- Professor Alexander McCall Smith, CBE, FRSE, Author and Academic. For services to Literature, to Academia and to Charity
- Professor Neil James McCready Mortensen, lately President, Royal College of Surgeons of England. For services to Surgery.
- Gerald Maurice Ronson, CBE, For services to Philanthropy and to the Jewish Community.

=== The Most Honourable Order of the Bath ===
==== Knight/Dame Commander of the Order of the Bath (KCB / DCB) ====
Military

- Lieutenant General Robert Magowan, CB, CBE, Royal Marines, N028330Y.
- Lieutenant General Sharon Nesmith, 531124.

Civil

- Max Hill, KC, lately Director of Public Prosecutions, Crown Prosecution Service. For services to Law and Order.

==== Companion of the Order of the Bath (CB) ====
Military

- Rear Admiral Andrew Betton, OBE, Royal Navy, C033663C.
- Rear Admiral James David Morley, Royal Navy, C034410Y
- Major General Kevin Mark Copsey, OBE, 533047.
- Major General John Robert Mead, OBE, 537468.
- Air Vice-Marshal Nigel James Colman, OBE, Royal Air Force, 8304546T.
- Air Marshal Ian David Gale, MBE, Royal Air Force, 8304212Q.

Civil

- Ruth Léonie Hannant, Director General, Policy, Department for Culture, Media and Sport. For Public Service.
- Liam Cledwyn Laurence Smyth, Clerk of Legislation, House of Commons. For services to Parliament.
- Jonathan Marron, Director General, Office of Health Inequalities and Disparities, Department of Health and Social Care. For services to Public Health.
- Lee McDonough, Director General, Net Zero, Nuclear and International, Department for Energy Security and Net Zero. For services to Energy and Climate.
- Simon Millhouse, Ministry of Defence. For services to Defence.
- Neil Brendan O'Connor, CBE, lately Director, Building Safety Programme, Department for Levelling Up, Housing and Communities. For services to Building Safety.
- Polly Theresa Payne, Director General, Policy, Department for Culture, Media and Sport. For Public Service.
- Sir Arthur Gareth Ludovic Emrys Rhys Williams, Bt, Government Chief Commercial Officer, Cabinet Office. For Public Service.
- Kenneth Andrew Lyons Thomson, lately Director General, Scottish Government. For Public Service.
- Brendan Peter Threlfall, CBE, Director General, Union and Windsor Framework, Cabinet Office. For Public Service.
- Dr Abigail Tierney, lately Director General, Home Office. For Public Service.

=== The Most Distinguished Order of Saint Michael and Saint George ===
==== Knight Grand Cross of the Order of St Michael and St George (GCMG) ====
- Sir Stephen Lovegrove, KCB, formerly National Security Adviser, Cabinet Office. For services to National Security.

==== Knight Commander of the Order of St Michael and St George (KCMG) ====
- Thomas Drew, CMG, Director General, Defence and Intelligence, Foreign, Commonwealth and Development Office. For services to British Foreign Policy and National Security.
- Richard Grenville Russell Evans, Chairman, Hemingways Hospitality Ltd. For services to Business, to Sport and to Charity.
- Crawford Falconer, Chief Trade Negotiation Adviser and Second Permanent Secretary, Department for Business and Trade. For services to International Trade.

==== Companion of the Order of St Michael and St George (CMG) ====
- Jennifer Elizabeth Anderson, Director, Consular and Crisis, Foreign, Commonwealth and Development Office. For services to British Foreign Policy and to British Nationals Overseas.
- Zamir Nicholas Catasaras, Director General for Russia and Ukraine, Cabinet Office. For services to British Foreign Policy.
- Roger James Coventry, Criminal Justice Adviser. For services to Justice and Stability overseas.
- Colin Mark Evans, Director General, Foreign, Commonwealth and Development Office. For services to National Security.
- Dr Fiona Hill, Senior Fellow, Brookings Institution, Washington D.C., United States of America. For services to International Relations.
- Dr Rurik Miles Marsden, OBE, Development Director, British Embassy Yangon, Myanmar. For services to International Development.
- Susanna Mary Davies Moorehead, lately Chair, Development Assistance Committee, The Organisation for Economic Co-operation and Development (OECD). For services to International Development and Diplomacy.
- Jane Anne Nelson, Director, Corporate Responsibility Initiative, Kennedy School of Government, Harvard University, United States of America. For services to Business and to Sustainability.
- Dr Sara Pantuliano, Chief Executive, ODI. For services to Peacebuilding, to Humanitarian Assistance and to International Development.
- Simon Penny, lately H.M. Trade Commissioner for the Middle East and Pakistan and H.M. Consul General to Dubai and the Northern Emirates. For services to International Trade and Investment.
- Christopher Terence Wood, lately Consul-General, British Consulate-General, Shanghai, China. For services to British Foreign Policy

=== The Royal Victorian Order ===
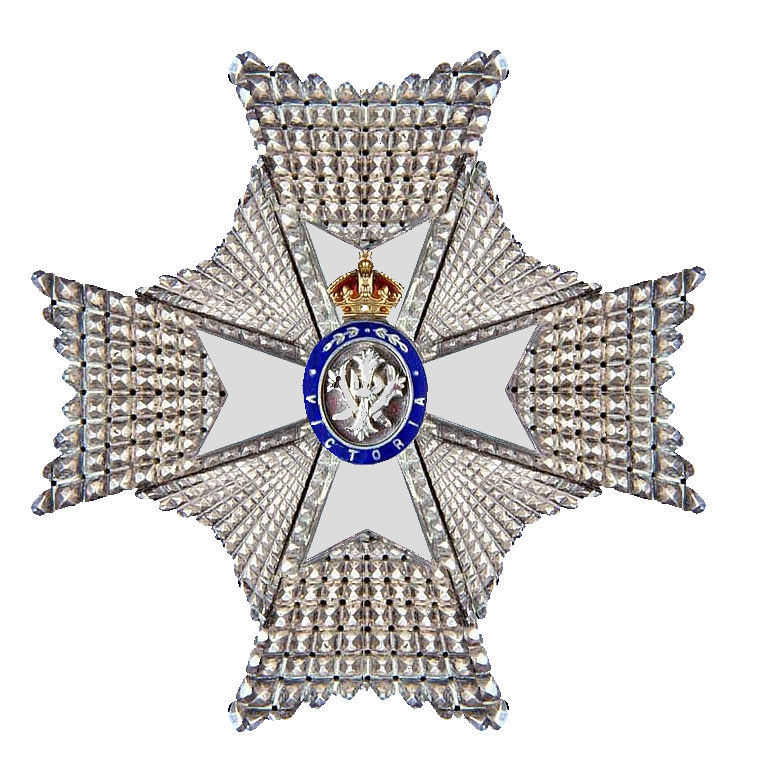
Breast star of a Knight / Dame Commander of the Royal Victorian Order

==== Knight Grand Cross of the Royal Victorian Order (GCVO) ====
- The Most Reverend and Right Honourable Justin Portal Welby, Archbishop of Canterbury, on the occasion of the Coronation of Their Majesties The King and The Queen.

==== Knight/Dame Commander of the Royal Victorian Order (KCVO / DCVO) ====
- Rowena Jane Feilden, CVO, Lady in Waiting to The Princess Royal.
- Colonel Edward Thomas Bolitho, OBE, Lord-Lieutenant of Cornwall.
- The Very Reverend Dr David Michael Hoyle, MBE, Dean of Westminster Abbey, on the occasion of the Coronation of Their Majesties The King and The Queen.

==== Commander of the Royal Victorian Order (CVO) ====
- Ian Angus Campbell, Lord-Lieutenant of Dorset.
- Sophia Louisa Densham, LVO, Private Secretary to Her Majesty The Queen.
- Patric Laurence Dickinson, LVO, Secretary of the Order of the Garter.
- Dr Veronica Mary Geneste Ferguson, LVO, Surgeon-Oculist to Queen Elizabeth II.
- Alastair Gilbert Martin, Secretary, Duchy of Cornwall.
- Malcolm Ian, Baron Offord of Garvel, lately Trustee, The Duke of Edinburgh's Award Scheme.
- Sir Antonio Pappano, Conductor of the Coronation Orchestra, on the occasion of the Coronation of Their Majesties The King and The Queen.
- Professor James Roy Robertson, LVO, MBE, lately Apothecary to His Majesty The King at the Palace of Holyroodhouse.

==== Lieutenant of the Royal Victorian Order (LVO) ====
- Ian Scott Anderson, MVO, Director, The Duke of Edinburgh's Commonwealth Study Conferences.
- Mark Appleby, Crown Jeweller.
- Colonel Jeremy David Bagshaw, CBE, Late Coldstream Guards, 534873; lately Chief of Staff, London District, on the occasion of the Coronation of Their Majesties The King and The Queen.
- Major Grant Vincent Ashley Baker, Gentleman Usher to His Majesty The King.
- Paul David Baumann, CBE, Receiver-General, Westminster Abbey, on the occasion of the Coronation of Their Majesties The King and The Queen.
- Charles Harcourt James Davies, MVO, Private Secretary to The Princess Royal.
- Karen Ross Findlay, Commander, Metropolitan Police Service, on the occasion of the Coronation of Their Majesties The King and The Queen.
- Dr Michael Terence Isaac, Occupational Health Advisor to the Royal Household.
- Air Vice-Marshal Richard Howard Lacey, CBE, lately Gentleman Usher to His Majesty The King.
- Charlotte Elizabeth Martin, MVO, Deputy Head of Ceremonial, Royal Household.
- Jonathan David Rogerson Martin, Director of Ceremonials, Department for Culture, Media and Sport, on the occasion of the Coronation of Their Majesties The King and The Queen.
- Ian Donald McCowan, lately Secretary to the Governor-General of Canada.
- Professor Paul Mealor, Music Advisor, Honours of Scotland Service.
- Graham Paul Midgley, Head of Royal Travel, Royal Household.
- Gavin Donald Reid, Music Advisor, Honours of Scotland Service.
- Paul John Sedwick, Deputy Ranger, Windsor Great Park.
- Lieutenant Colonel James Edward Noel Bridgeman Shaw, Grenadier Guards, 559678; Brigade Major, Household Division, on the occasion of the Coronation of Their Majesties The King and The Queen.
- Nicholas Kester Smith, Director of Racing and Public Affairs, Ascot Racecourse.
- David William Courtenay Whelton, OBE, Music Advisor, on the occasion of the Coronation of Their Majesties The King and The Queen.
- James Wyndham Williams, Music Advisor, on the occasion of the Coronation of Their Majesties The King and The Queen.

==== Member of the Royal Victorian Order (MVO) ====
- Russell Adams, RVM, Custodian of California Stores, Royal Collection, Royal Household.
- Captain Andrew Mark Aspden, Royal Navy, lately Principal Private Secretary to The Duke and Duchess of Edinburgh.
- Ian Charles Bartlett, Clerk of the Works, Westminster Abbey, on the occasion of the Coronation of Their Majesties The King and The Queen.
- Nicholas John Birch, Sergeant, Metropolitan Police Service. For services to Royalty and Specialist Protection.
- Ian Leslie Bullock, RVM, Security Officer Team Leader, Palace of Holyroodhouse.
- Emma Jane Clarke, Secretary, Royal Farms, Windsor.
- Nicola Charlotte Craig, Royal Borough of Windsor and Maidenhead, on the occasion of the Coronation Concert.
- Andrew John Cranidge, Superintendent, Thames Valley Police, on the occasion of the Coronation Concert.
- Anne Maria Curran, Personal and Administration Assistant, Superintendent's Office, Windsor Castle.
- Sarah Louise Davis, Head of Press and Marketing, Royal Collection, Royal Household.
- Julie Elizabeth Denby, lately Deputy Clerk/Administrator, Greater Manchester Lieutenancy.
- Michael Robert Duncan, lately Special Project Advisor, Royal Household, on the occasion of the Coronation of Their Majesties The King and The Queen.
- Hannah Elizabeth Evans, Programme Manager, Household of The Princess Royal.
- David Irwin Foy, Stud Groom, Royal Paddocks, Hampton Court Palace.
- Christopher William Andrew Hallworth, Senior Business Applications and Infrastructure Manager, Royal Collection, Royal Household.
- Stephanie Kate Howard, Moves and Operations Manager, Buckingham Palace Re-servicing Programme, Royal Household.
- Adelaide Georgina Gray Izat, Paintings Conservator, Royal Collection, Royal Household.
- Daniel James Kevin Johnson, Archbishop of Canterbury's Coronation Planning Director, on the occasion of the Coronation of Their Majesties The King and The Queen.
- Kevin Malkin, Detective Constable, Metropolitan Police Service. For services to Royalty Protection.
- Louise Michelle Walker-Pickett, Purchasing and Cost Control Co- ordinator, Royal Household.
- Nicola Jane Pritchard, Property Project Manager, Windsor Castle.
- Warrant Officer Class 1 David Alexander Roper, Grenadier Guards, 25131200; Superintending Clerk, Household Division, on the occasion of the Coronation of Their Majesties The King and The Queen.
- Warrant Officer Class 2 Julian Philip Desmond Sandford, Royal Corps of Army Music, 25152991; Sergeant Major, Band of the Household Cavalry, on the occasion of the Coronation of Their Majesties The King and The Queen.
- Christopher Charles Savage, lately Messenger Sergeant Major, The King's Body Guard of the Yeomen of the Guard.
- Derrick Andrew Scott, Royal Borough of Windsor and Maidenhead, on the occasion of the Coronation Concert.
- Thomas Nicholas McKinlay Service, lately Acting Chief Operating Officer, Household of The Prince and Princess of Wales.
- Elizabeth Fiona St Clair, Sergeant, Metropolitan Police Service. For services to Royalty and Specialist Protection.
- Kathryn Elizabeth Stone, Paper Conservator, Royal Collection, Royal Household.
- Paul Stonell, Collections Information Officer, Royal Collection, Royal Household.
- Christopher Tombling, Head Chef, Royal Household.
- Karen Louise Willemsen, Head HR, Royal Household.

=== Royal Victorian Medal (RVM) ===
Ribbon of the Royal Victorian Medal

Silver - Bar

- Gary William Adams, RVM, Gatekeeper, Crown Estate, Windsor.
- Andrew John Buckland, RVM, Jersey Herdsman, Royal Farms, Windsor.
- Neil Hepple Dodds, RVM, Team Supervisor, Crown Estate, Windsor.
- Jose Manuel Lazarczuk, RVM, Groundsman, Crown Estate Windsor.

Silver

- Andrew David Basson, Office Assistant and Insignia Clerk, Royal Household.
- Gary Clarke, Fire Safety and Access Officer, Buckingham Palace.
- Edward Peter Evans, lately Divisional Sergeant Major, The King's Body Guard of the Yeomen of the Guard.
- Malcolm Greenland, Castle Attendant, Windsor Castle.
- Helen Hitchcock, lately Coffee Shop Supervisor, Windsor Farm Shop.
- Isabel Lorna Laylo, Housekeeping Assistant, Kensington Palace.
- Matthew Simon Murphy, Senior Palace Attendant, Royal Household.
- Timothy James Rayson, Axe Keeper, The Honourable Corps of Gentlemen at Arms.
- Elisabeth Michelle Roberts, Helpdesk and Property Co-ordinator, Windsor Castle.
- Corporal of the Horse Kate Elizabeth Sandford, Royal Corps of Army Music, 30186649; Household Cavalry Band, on the occasion of the Coronation of Their Majesties The King and The Queen.
- James Richard Shaw, lately Personal Assistant to the Assistant Private Secretary to His Majesty The King.
- Fiona Ailsa Smith, lately Ranger, Balmoral Estate.
- John Sspelzini, Divisional Sergeant Major, The King's Body Guard of the Yeomen of the Guard.
- Monica Jane Tandy, Warden, Windsor Castle.
- Vanessa Anne Wakeford, House Manager, Government House, Guernsey.
- Barry James Whearty, Painter and Decorator, Crown Estate, Windsor.

Silver - Honorary

Jorge Manuel Martins Fernandes Jose, Palace Attendant, Royal Household.

=== The Most Excellent Order of the British Empire ===
==== Knight/Dame Grand Cross of the Order of the British Empire (GBE) ====
Civil

- The Right Honourable Dame Margaret Mary Beckett, DBE, MP, Member of Parliament for Derby South. For Parliamentary, Political and Public Service.
- Professor Dame Carol Mary Black, DBE, Independent Adviser on Combatting Drugs. For Public Service.
- Sir William Blackledge Beaumont, CBE, DL, Chair, World Rugby. For services to Rugby Union Football and to Charity.
- Professor Sir James Rufus McDonald, FREng, FRSE, President, Royal Academy of Engineering. For services to Engineering, to Education and to Energy.
- Sir Ridley Scott, Director and Producer. For services to the UK Film Industry.

==== Dame Commander of the Order of the British Empire (DBE) ====
Civil

- Dr Margaret Ebunoluwa Aderin, MBE, Chancellor, University of Leicester. For services to Science Education and to Diversity.
- Amanda Jayne Blanc, Group Chief Executive Officer, Aviva. For services to Business, to Gender Equality and to Net-Zero.
- Professor Sonia Boyce, OBE, Artist. For services to Art.
- Jilly Cooper, CBE, Author. For services to Literature and to Charity.
- Felicity Ann Dahl, Founder, Roald Dahl's Marvellous Children's Charity and the Roald Dahl Museum and Story Centre. For services to Philanthropy, to Literature and to Young People.
- Dr Jennifer Dixon, CBE, Chief Executive, The Health Foundation. For services to the NHS and to Public Health.
- Tristina Adele Harrison, Chief Executive Officer, TalkTalk Group. For services to Telecommunications.
- Dianne Michèle Jeffrey, CBE, DL, lately Trustee and Founder Chair, Age International. For services to Older People Abroad and to the community in Derbyshire.
- Professor Valerie Joan Lund, CBE, Emeritus Professor in Rhinology, University College London. For services to Rhinology.
- Siobhain Ann McDonagh, MP, Member of Parliament for Mitcham and Morden. For Parliamentary and Political Service.
- Ruth Elizabeth Miskin, CBE, Children's Reading Expert, Read Write Inc. For services to Education.
- Marit Mohn, Philanthropist. For services to Philanthropy.
- Professor Molly Morag Stevens, FRS, FREng, John Black Professor of Bionanoscience, University of Oxford and Professor, Imperial College London. For services to Medicine.
- Cristina Alicia Taylor, Philanthropist and Co-Founder, The Taylor Family Foundation. For charitable services to Children and Young People.
- Judith Weir, CBE, Master of the King's Music. For services to Music

==== Commander of the Order of the British Empire (CBE) ====
Military

- Commodore Stephen David Roberts, Royal Navy, C032675H.
- Brigadier Vivienne Wendy Buck, 539464.
- Major General Julian Nicholas Edward Buczacki, 547874.
- Brigadier Matthew Timothy Cansdale, MBE, 542140.
- Major General Darren Howard Crook, 538948.
- Colonel Lucy Margaret Giles, 533691.
- Colonel Michael Robert Smith, 533745.
- Air Commodore Catherine Clare Coton, Royal Air Force, 8032422G.
- Air Commodore Jonathan Moreton, Royal Air Force, 2636472F.
- Air Commodore Gerard Alan Opie, Royal Air Force, 5203734U.

Civil

- Louise Elizabeth Alexander. Human Resources Director, HM Courts and Tribunals Service and Trustee, Rowland Hill Fund. For Public and Voluntary Service.
- Ellen Atkinson, LVO. Director, Constitution and Major Events, Cabinet Office. For Public Service.
- Mark Timothy Austin. Partner, Latham & Watkins. For services to the Economy.
- Henrietta Rosamund Clare Barkworth-Nanton. Co-Founder and Patron, The Joanna Simpson Foundation and Chair, Refuge. For services to People Affected by Domestic Abuse and Homicide.
- Charlotte Ann Beardmore. Executive Director, Professional Policy, The Society of Radiographers. For services to Radiography.
- Andrew James Bell. Lately Co-Founder and Chief Executive Officer, AJ Bell plc. For services to the Financial Sector.
- Professor Michaela Jane Benzeval. Professor of Longitudinal Research and Director of Understanding Society, University of Essex. For services to Social Science.
- Don Black, OBE. Lyricist. For services to Music.
- Stuart Christopher John Broad, MBE. Cricketer. For services to Cricket.
- Richard Broyd, OBE. Philanthropist. For services to Heritage and Conservation.
- James Alexander Bullion. Lately Executive Director, Adult Social Services, Norfolk County Council and lately President, Association of Directors of Adult Social Services. For services to Social Care.
- Robert Geoffrey Burrow, MBE. For services to Motor Neurone Disease Awareness.
- William Morris Bush. Senior Adviser, Premier League. For services to Sport.
- Dr. Denise Marie Chaffer. Lately Director, Safety and Learning, NHS Resolution and lately President of the Royal College of Nursing. For services to Patient Safety.
- Dr. Jung Chang. Author. For services to Literature and to History.
- David George Crozier. Lately Head, Strategic Partnerships and Engagement, Queen's University Belfast. For services to the Economy.
- Mark Cutifani. Lately Chief Executive, Anglo American. For services to Investment in the Global Mining Industry.
- Huw Charles Davies. Lately Chief Executive, British Association for Supported Employment. For services to Employment for Disabled People.
- Mark William Davies. Director, Windsor Framework Taskforce, Cabinet Office. For Public Service.
- Dr. Laura Miranda Dawson (Laura Gilbert). Director, Data Science, Prime Minister's Office. For services to Technology and Analysis.
- Richard George Deverell. Director, Royal Botanic Gardens, Kew. For services to Botanical Science and Conservation.
- Professor Philip John Diamond. Director General, Square Kilometre Array Observatory. For services to Global Radio Astronomy.
- Catherine Jane Uttley Dovey. Co-Founder, Beacon Collaborative and Director, Rosa Fund. For services to Philanthropy, to Women and Girls, to the Arts and to the Economy.
- Charles Henry, Duke of Richmond and Gordon, DL. For services to Heritage, to Sport and to Charity.
- Kevin James David Ellis. Alliance Senior Partner, PwC UK and Middle East. For services to Economic Growth and Expanding Social Mobility.
- Nicholas Emery. Founding Partner and Chief Executive Officer, Brandtech Media. For services to the Media and Marketing Industries.
- Professor Paul Emery, OBE. Versus Arthritis Professor of Rheumatology, Leeds Institute of Rheumatic and Musculoskeletal Disease, University of Leeds. For services to Rheumatology.
- Professor Penelope Claire Endersby, FREng. Chief Executive Officer, Met Office. For services to Meteorology, to Defence Science and to Technology.
- Professor Kenneth John Falconer, FRSE. Regius Professor of Mathematics, University of St Andrews. For services to Mathematics.
- Angela Foulkes. Chief Executive and Principal, The Sheffield College. For services to Further Education.
- Yvonne Helen Fovargue, MP. Member of Parliament for Makerfield. For Political and Public Service.
- Timothy David Gardam. Journalist. For services to Journalism and to Education.
- Professor Danielle Amanda George, MBE. Professor of Radio Frequency Engineering, University of Manchester. For services to Public Engagement in Engineering.
- Dr. Phillip Anthony George. Lately Chair, Arts Council of Wales. For services to the Arts in Wales.
- Paul William Martin Golding. Chair, Pinewood Group. For services to Business and to the UK Film Industry.
- Catherine Anne Goodman, LVO. Artist and Educator. For services to Art.
- Professor Roger James Goodman. Nissan Professor of Modern Japanese Studies and Warden, St. Antony's College, University of Oxford. For services to Social Science.
- Gayle Jean Margaret Gorman. Lately HM Chief Inspector and Chief Executive, Education Scotland. For services to Education and Charity.
- Gerard Arthur Georges Grech. Founder, Tech Nation and Managing Director, Founders at the University of Cambridge. For services to the Technology Sector.
- The Reverend Nicholas Glyn Paul Gumbel. Lately Vicar, Holy Trinity Brompton, London. For services to the Church of England.
- Paul Harris. Deputy Chief Executive Officer and Operations Director, HM Courts and Tribunals Service. For Public and Voluntary Service.
- Martin James Hewitt, QPM. Lately Chair, National Police Chiefs Council. For services to Policing.
- Professor Peter Michael Hollingsworth. Director of Science and Deputy Keeper, Royal Botanic Garden, Edinburgh. For services to Botanical Science.
- Karl James Hoods. Chief Digital and Information Officer, Department for Science, Innovation and Technology and Department for Energy Security and Net Zero. For services to Technology and to Education.
- Professor Andrew Lee Hopkins, FRS, FMedSci, FRSE. Chief Executive Officer, Exscientia. For services to Science and to Innovation.
- Christian Edward Johnston Horner, OBE. Team Principal and Chief Executive Officer, Red Bull Racing. For services to Motor Sport.
- Pauline Jean Howie, OBE. Lately Chief Executive, Scottish Ambulance Service. For services to Emergency Health Care.
- Professor Ronald Edmund Hutton, FBA. Professor of History, University of Bristol. For services to History.
- Michelle Christina Jarman-Howe. Chief Operating Officer of Prisons, HM Prison and Probation Service. For Public Service.
- Michael Keith Jary. Lately Lead Non-Executive Director, Department for Levelling Up, Housing and Communities. For Public Service.
- Professor Alexandrina Henderson Farmer Jay, OBE. Lately Chair, Independent Inquiry into Child Sexual Abuse. For services to the Prevention of Child Sexual Abuse.
- Patricia Anne Jessopp. Chief Executive Officer, Royal Mint. For services to Industry and to the Financial Sector.
- Dr. Chandra Mohan Kanneganti. General Practitioner, Goldenhill Medical Centre, Stoke-on-Trent. For services to General Practice.
- Lynne Kelly. Chair and Trustee, Haemophilia Wales. For services to People with Haemophilia.
- Professor Timothy James Greaves Kendall. Lately National Clinical Director for Mental Health, NHS England. For services to Mental Health Care in England.
- Naguib Kheraj. Chair, Rothesay Limited. For services to Business and to the Economy.
- Christopher Ross Kingsley, OBE. Co-Founder and Chief Technology Officer, Rebellion. For services to the Creative Industries.
- Jonathon Jason Kingsley, OBE. Co-Founder, Chief Executive Officer and Creative Director, Rebellion. For services to the Creative Industries.
- David Eric Laing, DL. For services to Charity and to Philanthropy.
- Angela Marie Leitch. Lately Chief Executive, Public Health Scotland. For services to Public Health in Scotland.
- Gerard Anthony Lemos, CMG. Non-Executive Chair, HM Prisons and Probation Service Agency Board. For Public and Voluntary Service.
- Zoe Ann Lewis. Principal and Chief Executive Officer, Middlesbrough College. For services to Further Education.
- Dr. Andrew John Mackintosh. Adviser, The Knowledge Assets Initiative. For services to Science and Technology, and to Enterprise Development.
- Barbara Hilary Manning. Lately Head of Payments, Banking and Shared Services, Department for Work and Pensions. For services to the Public and to the State Funeral of Her Majesty Queen Elizabeth II.
- Anthony McGee. Director, Ukraine Task Force, Ministry of Defence. For Public Service.
- Michael Messinger, LVO, QPM. Lately Chancellor, Order of St. John (England) and Deputy Chairman, St John Ambulance. For voluntary service to St John Ambulance.
- Colin Morrison, OBE. Founder and Chair, Boarding School Partnerships. For services to Education.
- Katherine Louise Mosse, OBE. Author. For services to Literature, to Women and to Charity.
- Ciaran Michael Murphy, KC. Senior Counsel. For services to Criminal Justice.
- Stuart Neil Luke Murphy. Chief Executive, English National Opera. For services to Opera.
- Professor Joseph Gerard Nellis. Professor of Global Economy, School of Management Cranfield University. For services to Higher Education, to Economics, to Business and to Charity.
- Dr. Vanessa Jane Ogden. Chief Executive Officer, Mulberry Schools Trust. For services to Education.
- René Olivieri. For services to the Charitable Sector.
- Lynn Margaret Pamment. Chair, Financial Reporting Advisory Board. For Public Service.
- Diana Marjorie Parkes. Co-Founder and Patron, The Joanna Simpson Foundation. For services to Vulnerable Children Suffering from Domestic Abuse and Domestic Homicide.
- William James Pease-Watkin (Bill Watkin). Chief Executive, Sixth Form Colleges Association. For services to Further Education.
- Professor Andrew David Mark Pettegree, FBA. Historian and Author. For services to Literature.
- Andrew Kerry Pike, OBE. Lately Director, GREAT Britain and Northern Ireland Campaign, Cabinet Office. For Public Service.
- Erin Pizzey. Campaigner and Activist. For services to the Victims of Domestic Abuse.
- Professor Ann Prentice, OBE. Honorary Senior Visiting Fellow, MRC Epidemiology Unit, University of Cambridge. For services to British and Global Public Health Nutrition.
- Jessica Mary Pulay. Co-Head of Policy and Markets, UK Debt Management Office. For services to Public Finances.
- Professor Margaret Mary Rae. Lately President, UK Faculty of Public Health. For services to Public Health and to Public Health Standards.
- Dr. Mala Rao, OBE. Senior Clinical Fellow, Imperial College London. For services to Public Health, the NHS, and to Equality and Diversity.
- Mark Julian Read. Chief Executive Officer, WPP. For services to the Creative Industries.
- Simon Trevor Regis. Deputy Director, Department for Culture, Media and Sport Legal Advisers, Government Legal Department. For services to Legislation.
- Professor Elizabeth Jane Robertson. Professor of Developmental Biology, University of Oxford. For services to Medical Sciences.
- Lady (Victoria Susan) Robey, OBE. Lately Chair, London Philharmonic Orchestra, and Founder Director, Music Masters UK. For services to Music.
- Shirley Denise Rogers. Director, Scottish Government. For services to Scottish Community Healthcare and to Major Events.
- Joanne Lucille Roney, OBE. Chief Executive, Manchester City Council. For services to Local Government.
- Lady (Susan Mary) Sainsbury. Philanthropist. For services to Philanthropy and to Charity.
- Bidesh Sarkar. Chief Financial Officer, Department for Business and Trade. For Public Service.
- Andrew Edward Scattergood. Chief Executive Officer, The Royal Parks. For services to Heritage and to Charity.
- Catriona Mary Robertson Schmolke, FREng. Chief Executive Officer, Charlie Five. For services to Engineering.
- Peter Leslie Shilton, OBE. For services to Association Football and to the Prevention of Gambling Harm.
- Kevin Sinfield, OBE. For services to Motor Neurone Disease Awareness.
- Elizabeth Jane Smith, MSP. Member of the Scottish Parliament for Mid Scotland and Fife. For services to Sport.
- Lady (Frances Mary) Sorrell, OBE. Designer and Co-Founder, Sorrell Foundation and Co-Founder and Trustee, The Saturday Club Trust. For services to Design and to the Creative Industries.
- Luke Staiano. Deputy Director, Ministry of Defence. For services to Defence.
- Ashley Tabor-King, OBE. Businessman and Founder and President of Global, the Media and Entertainment Group. For services to Media and Entertainment.
- Charlotte Helen Taylor. Lately Director, Antivirals and Therapeutics Taskforce, Department of Health and Social Care. For services to Health and Social Care, particularly during Covid-19.
- Isabelle Trowler. Chief Social Worker for Children and Families, Department for Education. For services to Children's Social Care.
- Professor Robert Adrianus Leonardus Van de Noort. Chair, Thames Regional Flood and Coastal Committee and Vice Chancellor, University of Reading. For services to Science, to Flood Risk Management and to Sustainability.
- Stephen Banks Walker. Director, Strengthening Families, Leeds City Council. For services to Children and Families.
- Vivien Waterfield. Deputy Chief Executive, Home-Start. For services to Early Years Learning.
- Dr. Charles Nicholas Woodburn. Chief Executive Officer, BAE Systems. For services to International Trade and Skills Development.
- John Mark Yallop. Lately Chair, Financial Markets Standards Board. For services to the Financial Sector and to Charity.

International list

- The Honourable Albert Isola, Minister for Financial Services and Gaming, Gibraltar. For services to the Financial and Digital Industries in Gibraltar.
- George Koukis, Founder Temenos and Chair, The Mozartists. For services to Music, to Medicine and to Education.

==== Officer of the Order of the British Empire (OBE) ====
Military

- Commander Trefor Morgan Fox, Royal Navy, C037045S.
- Commander Christopher Robert Hollingworth, Royal Navy, C041543F.
- Colonel Andrew Glenn David Lock, Royal Marines, N029023U.
- Commander Lucy Jane Ottley, Royal Navy, V030919T.
- Commander Ian Hayden Richardson, Royal Navy, C038366T.
- Commander Jamie Duncan Wells, Royal Navy, C039514F.
- Captain Allan Thomas Youp, Royal Navy, C038889U.
- Lieutenant Colonel Nicholas Paul Andrew, Royal Regiment of Artillery, 537949.
- Lieutenant Colonel Tracy-Louise Appleyard, Royal Army Medical Corps, 540495.
- Colonel Edward Hugh James Carter, 532335.
- Lieutenant Colonel Ewan Christian Noble Harris, The Royal Welsh, 545550.
- Lieutenant Colonel Timothy Matthew Holmes, Corps of Royal Electrical and Mechanical Engineers, 546527.
- Colonel Matthew Gordon Timothy Lewis, 554319.
- Lieutenant Colonel (now Acting Colonel) John Andrew Lyons, Royal Corps of Signals, 549561.
- Lieutenant Colonel Craig David Pope, Royal Army Medical Corps, 549180.
- Colonel Nigel Offley Crewe-Read, MBE, 545207.
- Colonel Thomas Woolley, 551152.
- Colonel Nicholas George Charles Yardley, 544447.
- Wing Commander Erica Jane Ferguson, Royal Air Force, 2629012K.
- Wing Commander Matthew Elfed Lewis, Royal Air Force, 5208143G.
- Wing Commander Stephen McCleery, Royal Air Force, 2635078L.
- Wing Commander Alison Morton, Royal Air Force, W996632T.
- Air Commodore Patrick James Shea-Simonds, Royal Air Force, 5208323H.
- Group Captain Paul Andrew Weaver Smith, Royal Air Force, 8024057B.
- Wing Commander Christopher Andrew Wright, MBE, Royal Air Force, 2653992B.

Civil

- James Martin Ainscough. Lately Chief Executive Officer, Help Musicians. For services to Music and Musicians.
- Heather Margaret Patricia Akehurst. Chief Executive, Open Awards. For services to Further Education in Merseyside.
- Edward Jonathan Corcos Album. Founder, The Settle and Carlisle Railway Trust. For services to Railway Heritage and to the communities in the North of England.
- Genethlios Michael Anastassiades. Product and Lighting Designer. For services to Design.
- Andrew Robert James Anderson. Head, Maggie's Cancer Support Centre. For services to Cancer Support in the UK and Abroad.
- Dr. Claire Elizabeth Armstrong. Chief Executive Officer, Royal British Legion Scotland. For services to Veterans in Scotland.
- Nigel Christopher Ashton. Councillor, North Somerset Council. For Political and Public Service.
- Duncan Roy Barber. For services to the Defence Industry.
- Virginia Barrett. Principal and Chief Executive Officer, Farnborough College of Technology. For services to Further Education.
- Tiffany Crowell Beck. Chair of Trustees, Maritime Academy Trust. For services to Education.
- Elaine Bedell. Chief Executive Officer, Southbank Centre. For services to Business and to the Arts.
- Baldev Parkash Bhardwaj. For services to the community in Oldbury, West Midlands.
- Professor Maurice Biriotti. Chief Executive Officer, SHM Productions and Professor of Applied Humanities, University College London. For services to Business, to Academia and to Philanthropy.
- Antony Kenneth Blackburn. Broadcaster. For services to Broadcasting and to Charity.
- Jacqueline Blake. Lately Chair, LACA, The Food People. For services to Education.
- Christopher John Blandford. President, World Heritage UK. For services to World Heritage.
- Heather Jane Boardman. Adviser, British Fashion Council and Founder, British Beauty Council. For voluntary services to Fashion and Beauty.
- Professor Daniela Bortoletto. Head of Particle Physics, University of Oxford. For services to Particle Physics and to Gender Equality.
- Camilla Jane Bowry. Founder and Chief Executive Officer, Sal's Shoes. For services to Young People, to Education and to the Environment.
- Michael Andrew Boyd. Project Manager, Northern Ireland Human Rights Commission, Consultant Director for Northern Ireland, Rio Ferdinand Foundation, Chair, Belfast Healthy City and lately Director, Football Development, Irish Football Association. For services to Association Football, to Sport, to Charity and to Reconciliation in Northern Ireland.
- Eamonn John Boylan. Chief Executive, Greater Manchester Combined Authority. For services to Local Government.
- Anthony James Bravo. Principal, Basingstoke College of Technology. For services to Further Education.
- Dr. Stephen Brierley. Founder, Riverlane. For services to Quantum Computing.
- Millie Bright. Footballer. For services to Association Football.
- Professor Matthew Jon Brookes. Professor of Physics, University of Nottingham. For services to Physics.
- Abigail Margaret Brown. Councillor and lately Leader, Stoke-on-Trent City Council, and Deputy Chair, Local Government Association. For services to Local Government.
- Frank Edward Bryan. Lately Chair, Belfast Metropolitan College. For services to Further Education and the Economy in Northern Ireland.
- James Maurice Bullick. Finance and Compliance Director and Honorary Treasurer, Belfast Harbour Commissioners and British Ports Association. For services to the Maritime Industry.
- Professor Emma Bunce. Professor of Planetary Plasma Physics, University of Leicester. For services to Astronomy and Science Education.
- Paul Jeffrey Burger. Founder and Partner, Soho Artists. For services to the Music Industry and to Charity.
- Ruth Catherine Margaret Busby. People and Transformational Director, Great Western Railway and Network Rail Wales and Western. For services to Diversity in the Rail Industry.
- Lorraine Suzette Bushell. For services to Estranged Grandparents.
- Dr. Samantha Jane Callan. Director and Co-Founder, The Family Hubs Network Ltd. For services to Victims of Domestic Abuse.
- Eunice Fay Campbell-Clark. Lately Member, City of Nottingham Council. For services to Local Government.
- Dr. Kathryn Myrtle Chamberlain. Lately Chief Executive, Independent Monitoring Authority for the Citizens Rights' Agreements. For Public Service.
- Denise Joan Christie. Chair, Elizabeth Casson Trust. For services to Occupational Therapy.
- Jayne Louise Clarke. Executive Principal, Pinnacle Learning Trust. For services to Further Education.
- The Reverend Anthony James Collins. For services to Healthcare and to the community in Harrogate and Ripon, North Yorkshire.
- Neil Ernest Alexander Constable. Lately Chief Executive Officer, Shakespeare's Globe. For services to Theatre.
- Sarah Jane Cressall. Founder and Chief Executive Officer, The Creation Station. For services to Creativity in Education, Entertainment and Business.
- Thomas Daniel Critchley. Data Scientist, Prime Minister's Office. For services to Evidence-Based Policy.
- Dr. Ruth Louise Cromie. Research Fellow, Wildfowl and Wetlands Trust. For services to Wetland and Waterbird Conservation.
- Professor Adrian Michael Cruise. Emeritus Professor, University of Birmingham. For services to Space Science.
- Dr. Robert Nicholas Cullinan. Director, National Portrait Gallery. For services to Art.
- Laurence Alexander Cummings. Conductor, Harpsichordist, Music Director of the Academy of Ancient Music and the London Handel Festival, and William Crotch Professor of Historical Performance, Royal Academy of Music. For services to Music.
- Lynn Cummings, JP. Commercial Category Lead, Department for Work and Pensions. For Public Service.
- Professor William Cushley. Chair, Expert Committee on Pesticides. For services to the Regulation of Plant Protection Products.
- Dr. Dipankar Dutta. Chair, South Asia Voluntary Enterprise. For services to Charity.
- Roy Henry Dennis, MBE. Wildlife Conservationist. For services to Wildlife.
- Paul Anthony Denton. For services to Charity.
- Dr. Darrell Carmel De Souza. Lately Principal and Chief Executive Officer, Harrow College and Uxbridge College. For services to Further Education.
- Morag Deyes, MBE. Artistic Director, Dance Base, Edinburgh. For services to Dance.
- Angela Jane Charlotte Dickson, MBE. Co-Founder, The Brain Tumour Charity. For services to People with Brain Tumours.
- Neil Alan Dickson, MBE. Co-Founder, The Brain Tumour Charity. For services to People with Brain Tumours.
- Andrew James Dixon. Founding Trustee, Woodhaven Trust and Fairer Share and Founder, Arc InterCapital. For services to Prisoners and Ex-Offenders, to Property Tax Reform and to Entrepreneurship.
- Josephine Naomi Clare Dobrin. Co-Founder and Executive Chair, Creative Access. For services to the Creative Industries.
- Jonathan Donaghy. Deputy Director, Customs, HM Treasury. For Public Service.
- Amy Louise Doncaster. Deputy Director, Strategy and Future Design, Department for Work and Pensions. For Public Service.
- Terence Anthony Donnelly. Executive Chair, Donnelly Motor Group and Director, Taxi and Bus Conversions Ltd. For services to the Motor Industry in Northern Ireland.
- Professor Carol Ann Doyle. Lately Head of School for Nursing and Midwifery Education, Birmingham City University. For services to Nurse Education.
- Rachael Louise Doyle (Rachael Mills). Director, SE2 and Chirpy Heat. For services to Energy Efficiency and to Diversity and Inclusion.
- Philip Stephen Dudderidge. Co-Founder and Chair, Focusrite plc. For services to Business and to the Music Industry.
- Andrew Grant Duncan, DL. For services to the community in Worcestershire.
- Michael George Eakin. Chief Executive, Royal Liverpool Philharmonic. For services to Music and to the community in Liverpool, Merseyside.
- Catherine Louise Edwards. Lately Clinical Programmes Director, National Specialised Commissioning, NHS England. For services to the NHS.
- Emrys Shaun Elias. Lately Chair, Cwm Taf Morgannwg University Health Board. For services to the NHS and Mental Health Services in Wales.
- Gregory Elliot. Senior Officer, National Crime Agency. For services to Law Enforcement.
- Stuart John Ensor. National Chair, Royal Air Force Air Cadets. For voluntary service to Young People.
- John Neil Everitt. Chief Executive Officer, National Forest Company. For services to Conservation.
- David Farnsworth. Managing Director, City Bridge Foundation. For services to the Voluntary Sector in London.
- Dr. Oliver Robert Ford Davies. Actor. For services to Drama.
- Professor David Foskett, MBE. Lately Head of Hospitality, University of West London. For services to the Hospitality Industry and to Inclusivity.
- Mischa Kate Foxell. Deputy Director, Cabinet Office. For Public Service.
- Travis Dylan Frain. Campaigner. For services to Counter Extremism and to Victims of Terrorism.
- Janie Lorraine Frampton. For services to Equality for Women in Sport in the UK and Abroad.
- Rachel Gaisburgh-Watkyn. Managing Director, Tiny Box Company. For services to Sustainability, to Ethical Business Growth and to Exports.
- Anthony Gallagher. Chair, National Youth Sector Advisory Board. For services to Young People.
- Katie Gallagher. Director, Manchester Digital. For services to the Digital Technology Industry in the North-West.
- Mark Robert Timothy Garnier, MP. Member of Parliament for Wyre Forest. For Political and Public Service.
- Sandra Godley. For charitable service to the community in Coventry, West Midlands.
- Bruce Malcolm Gordon. Chair and Founder Member, Honorary Treasurers Forum. For Charitable Service.
- Colonel (Rtd) Brian Mark Gorski, MBE. For services to Museums and to the community in Bury, Greater Manchester.
- Solange Anna-Natasha Urdang. Chief Executive Officer and Founder, The Dang Studios, London, Co-Founder and Director, Black British Theatre Awards and lately Chief Executive Officer, Urdang Academy. For services to Dance and Musical Theatre.
- Andrew Graham. Deputy Director, Strategic Finance Directorate, Department for Education. For Public Service and to the community in County Durham.
- Natasha Jane Grant. Deputy Director, Cabinet Office. For Public Service.
- Edward James Gray. Lately Chair, Antivirals Taskforce. For services to Public Health during Covid-19.
- Betsy Gregory. For services to Dance.
- Yvette Mona Griffith. Co-Chief Executive, Jazz re:freshed, Founder Member, GiveBLACK and Founding Trustee, Black Funding Network. For services to Cultural Philanthropy and to Music.
- Neil Francis Guckian. Chief Executive, The Western Health and Social Care Trust. For services to Health and Social Care and to the community in Northern Ireland.
- Professor Gavin Halbert. Director, Cancer Research UK Formulation Unit, University of Strathclyde. For services to Cancer Treatment and Research.
- Professor David Rodney Heath-Brown. Emeritus Fellow, University of Oxford. For services to Mathematics and Mathematical Research.
- Paul Michael Heygate. Joint Managing Director, Heygate Group. For services to the Food Industry and to Charity.
- Gordon Arthur Woolnough Hickman. Head of Exotic Disease Policy, Department for Environment, Food and Rural Affairs. For services to Animal Health and voluntary service to Sport.
- Madeleine Clare Hinch, MBE. For services to Hockey.
- Elaine Hinchliffe-Dale (Elaine Dale). Director, Special Educational Needs and Disabilities Support, City College Norwich. For services to Further Education.
- Dr. Elizabeth Janine Hogben. Lately Secretary, Prime Minister's Council for Science and Technology, Government Office for Science. For services to Science in Government.
- Lady (Patricia Ann) Hopkins. For services to Architecture.
- Carol Wai Wing Hui. Lately Board Member, British Tourist Authority. For services to Tourism.
- Mahboob Hussain, JP. For services to the community in Buckinghamshire.
- Elizabeth Louise Hutton. Chief Executive Officer, Kicks Count. For services to Education and Prevention of Stillbirths.
- Alasdair Bruce Jackson. Chief Executive, Recycling Lives Charity. For services to the Rehabilitation of Offenders.
- Kerry Joanne Jackson. Chief Executive, St Gemma's Hospice. For services to Palliative and End of Life Care.
- Salim Hassanali Moledina Janmohamed. For charitable and voluntary services to Faith Communities.
- Peter Jefferies. Team Leader, Ministry of Defence. For services to Defence.
- Timothy Nigel Jenkins. Lately District Judge, Brentford County Court. For services to the Administration of Justice.
- Peter Sinclair Jensen. Lately Chair of Trustees, Home of Horseracing Trust and Chair, British Sporting Arts Trust. For Charitable Service.
- Dr. Christopher Paul Johnson. Forensic Pathologist, Home Office. For services to Criminal Justice.
- Christopher Jolly. Publisher, Jolly Phonics. For services to Education.
- Donna Jones. Team Leader, Ministry of Defence. For services to Defence.
- Janet Elizabeth Kay. Kinship Carer, Kinship. For services to Children and Families.
- Professor Simon Edward Kenny. National Clinical Director for Children and Young People, NHS England and Consultant Paediatric Surgeon, Alder Hey Children's Hospital. For services to Paediatric Surgery.
- Professor Bienvenido Arturo Langa Ferreira. Consultant Psychiatrist, NHS Lanarkshire. For services to Vulnerable People in Scotland.
- Nicholas David Leader. Lately Governor, HM Prison Berwyn. For Public Service.
- Kathryn Maria Leahy. Director of Operations, Heathrow Airport. For services to Aviation Transport and to Major Events.
- Cathryn Lee. Chief Executive, Alzheimer's Society. For services to Charity.
- Janet Legrand, KC. Lately Chair of Trustees, The Children's Society. For services to Young People.
- Carl Anthony Les. Leader, North Yorkshire Council. For services to Local Government.
- Philip John Loach, QFSM. Lately Chief Fire Officer, West Midlands Fire and Rescue Service. For services to Fire and Rescue.
- Dr. William Patrick James Lockhart. Deputy Director, International Biodiversity and Wildlife, Department for Environment, Food and Rural Affairs. For services to the Environment.
- Antony Craig Lockley. Director of Strategy and Assistant Chief Executive, Blackpool Council. For services to Local Government.
- Professor Mark Logan, FRSE. Chief Entrepreneurial Adviser to the Scottish Government. For services to the Economy.
- Sally-Ann Loudon. Lately Chief Executive, Convention of Scottish Local Authorities. For services to Local Government.
- Joshua MacAlister. Chair, Independent Review of Children's Social Care and Founder, Frontline. For services to Vulnerable Children.
- Norman Alexander MacDonald. Lately Local Councillor, Comhairle nan Eilean Siar. For services to the communities of Uig, Isle of Lewis and the Western Isles.
- Charles Piers Mackesy. Artist, Illustrator and Author. For services to Art and Literature.
- Catherine Elizabeth Magee. Chief Executive Officer, Dyslexia Scotland. For services to People with Dyslexia.
- Moni Mannings. Founder, EPOC (Empowering People of Colour). For services to Cultural Philanthropy, to Business and to Charity.
- Dr. Kathryn Jean Marks. Deputy Director, Environment Agency. For services to Flood Risk Management and to Equality, Diversity and Inclusion.
- Steven David Marshall. Chief Executive Officer, The Royal Naval, Army and Air Force Institute. For services to the Armed Forces.
- Sophia Mary Mason. Trustee, Garfield Weston Foundation. For services to Arts Philanthropy.
- Ian Stuart Matthews. Portfolio Leader, Ministry of Defence. For services to Defence.
- Samantha Kate Mayhew. Assistant Principal, Special Educational Needs and Disabilities, Weston College. For services to Further Education.
- Catherine McBride. Member, Trade and Agriculture Commission. For services to Economic Commentary and Trade Policy.
- Jonathan Robert McGoh. Chair and Co-Founder, The Reach Foundation and Co-Founder and Trustee, Reach Academy Feltham, London Borough of Hounslow. For services to Education.
- Alexander McLeish. For services to Charity.
- Martin Gerard McTague. Low Pay Commissioner and National Chair, UK Federation of Small Businesses. For services to Small Businesses.
- Thomas Anthony Meadows. Lead Operations Manager, Security Services Group, Defence Infrastructure Organisation. For services to Defence.
- Dr. Teame Mebrahtu. For services to Education, to Refugees and to the community in Bristol.
- Dr. Nicholas John Merriman. Chief Executive, The Horniman Museum and Gardens. For services to the Arts and to Heritage.
- Gillian Jayne Millane. Co-Founder, Love Grace. For services to Charitable Fundraising and Tackling Violence Against Women.
- Dr. Jane Patricia Monckton-Smith. Professor of Public Protection, University of Gloucestershire. For services to Criminal Justice.
- Keith Morgan. Coach, Crystal Palace Weightlifting Club. For services to Sport.
- Andrew David Murphy. Lately Chief Operating Officer, John Lewis Partnership. For services to the British Retail Industry.
- Professor James Michael Olu N'Dow, DL. Professor of Urological Surgery, University of Aberdeen. For services to Cancer and Urology, and to Voluntary Work.
- Professor Kimberley Anne-Isola Nekaris. Head, Nocturnal Primate Research Group, Oxford Brookes University. For services to Conservation.
- Kenneth Paul Newton. Governing Governor, HM Prison Birmingham. For Public Service.
- Robert Stewart Nicol. Lately Chief Executive, Inverness Chambers of Commerce. For services to the Economy of the Highlands of Scotland.
- Beryce Amy Nixon. Chief Executive Officer, Exceed Learning Partnership Trust. For services to Education.
- David Nuttall. Deputy Director, Neurodiversity, Disability and Learning Disability, Department of Health and Social Care. For services to People with Down Syndrome.
- Hannah Louise O'Callaghan. Co-Founder, Love Grace. For services to Charitable Fundraising and Tackling Violence Against Women.
- Kathleen Margaret O'Hare. Board Member, Belfast Metropolitan College and Member, Northern Ireland Council for the Curriculum. For services to Education in Northern Ireland.
- Dr. Tunde Okewale, MBE. Barrister. For services to Criminal Justice and Social Mobility.
- Dr. Sandra Ngozi Okoro. Lately Senior Vice President and General Counsel, World Bank. For services to Diversity in International Finance.
- Dr. Robert Leslie Orford. Chief Scientific Advisor for Health, Welsh Government. For services to Health Sciences and Evidence in Health Policy.
- David John O'Sullivan. Chief Optometric Advisor, Welsh Government. For services to Eye Care in Wales.
- Professor Nicholas Ossei-Gerning. Course Co-Director, Africa PCR Conference. For services to the Field of Interventional Cardiology.
- Mildred Baer Palley. Philanthropist. For services to the Arts and to Education.
- Brian Andrew Palmer. Founder and Chief Executive, Tharsus Group Ltd. For services to Manufacturing and Skills.
- Catherine Jane Parry. Lately Election Agent, Labour Party. For Political and Public Service.
- Munir Patel. Chief Executive Officer, XRAIL Group. For services to Rail Exports.
- Sarah Pateman. Community Safety Manager, Stevenage Borough Council. For services to the Victims of Domestic Abuse in Hertfordshire.
- Dr. Graham Paterson. Lately Executive Director, City Building. For services to Equality and Inclusion in Construction.
- Dr. Shriti Pattani. Lately President, The Society of Occupational Medicine. For services to Occupational Health.
- Nicola Heather Anne Patterson. Lately Director of Nursing, South Eastern Health and Social Care Trust. For services to Health and Social Care in Northern Ireland.
- Professor Rupert Mark Pearse. Professor of Intensive Care Medicine, Queen Mary University of London. For services to Intensive Care Medicine.
- Amy Sarah Perrin. Founder, The Marmalade Trust. For services to Older People.
- Oscar Victor Pinto-Hervia. Founder, Hervia. For services to Fashion and to Charity.
- Dr. Madsen Pirie. President, Adam Smith Institute. For services to Public Policy.
- Mary Margaret Portas. Retail Consultant and Broadcaster. For services to Business, to Broadcasting and to Charity.
- Alexander Reedijk. General Director, Scottish Opera. For services to the Performing Arts in Scotland.
- Marvin Rees. Mayor, Bristol City Council. For services to Local Government.
- Professor Julian Daryl Richards. Professor of Archaeology, University of York. For services to Heritage and Digital Archiving.
- Julian Richmond-Watson. Chair, Thoroughbred Breeders Association. For services to the British Horseracing Industry.
- José Salvador Riera. Deputy Director, Communications, Department for Culture, Media and Sport. For Public Service.
- Martin John Rigley, MBE. Lately Managing Director, Lindhurst Engineering Ltd. For services to the East Midlands Covid-19 Response and to the community in Derbyshire and Nottinghamshire.
- Ralph William James Rimmer. Lately Chief Executive Officer, Rugby Football League. For services to Rugby League Football.
- Dr. Lisa Margaret Ritchie. Head of Infection Prevention and Control, NHS England. For services to Healthcare, particularly during Covid-19.
- Michael Thomas Robinson. Chief Executive, Royal Scottish Geographical Society. For services to Climate Change Education.
- Professor Colva Mary Roney-Dougal. Professor of Mathematics, University of St Andrews. For services to Education and Mathematics.
- Kenneth James Gordon Harvey Ross. Founding Officer, National Down Syndrome Policy Group. For services to Charity, to Education and to People with Down Syndrome.
- Diane Rosalie Aldworth Ruddock. For services to the Environment, to Heritage and to the community in Northern Ireland.
- John Hamilton Ryley. Lately Head of News, Sky News. For services to Journalism.
- Clovis Constantine Salmon. Documentary Filmmaker. For services to Culture and to the Black Community.
- William Henry Salomon. President, Young Enterprise. For services to Education.
- Carolyn Margaret Sampson. Soprano. For services to Music.
- Steven Ross Savory. Chief Executive Officer, Gloucestershire Learning Alliance. For services to Education.
- Professor Ulrike Hermine Schmidt. Professor of Eating Disorders, King's College London and Consultant Psychiatrist, South London and Maudsley NHS Foundation Trust. For services to People with Eating Disorders.
- Ian Charles Sears. Commercial Specialist, Cabinet Office. For Public Service.
- Ruth Victoria Shaw. Chief Executive Officer, Premier League Charitable Fund. For services to Association Football and to Gender Equality.
- Rajwinder Singh. Principal Project Sponsor, Prison Infrastructure Team, Ministry of Justice. For Public Service.
- Dr. Sabesan Sithamparanathan, FREng. Founder and President, PervasID and Enterprise Fellow, Girton College, University of Cambridge. For services to Innovation Technology.
- David Alexander Smith. Departmental Records Officer and Chief Librarian, Department for Levelling Up, Housing and Communities. For services to Government Knowledge and Information Management.
- Marie Smith. Senior Officer, National Crime Agency. For services to Law Enforcement.
- Michelle Southern. Founder and Director, Street Paws. For services to Homeless People and their Pets.
- David Martin Sprackling. Lately Lawyer, Parliamentary Counsel, Office of the Parliamentary Counsel. For Public Service.
- Nicholas Stace. Chair, The Conduit Holding Company. For services to Consumers and to the Environment.
- Marc Howard Steene. Founder and Director, Outside In Art. For services to Art.
- Gavin Paul Stollar. Honorary Chair, Liberal Democrat Friends of Israel. For political service to the Jewish Community.
- Luigi Strinati. Delivery Director, HM Courts and Tribunals Service Wales. For Public Service.
- Lorraine Pfavayi Sunduza. Lately Chief Nurse, East London NHS Foundation Trust. For services to Mental and Community Health.
- Joanna Kathryn Swash. Group Chief Executive Officer, Moneypenny. For services to the Economy.
- Claire Louise Swift. Director of Social Responsibility, Making for Change. For services to the Rehabilitation of Prisoners.
- Professor Richard Hilary Templer. Lately Director of Innovation, Grantham Institute, Imperial College London. For services to Climate Innovation.
- Dr. Gillian Romaine Tett. Editorial Board, Financial Times. For services to Economic Journalism.
- Usha Ladwa-Thomas. Race Adviser, Welsh Government. For services to Black, Asian and Minority Ethnic Communities.
- Margaret Ann Throup, MP. Member of Parliament for Erewash. For Political and Public Service.
- Jane Elizabeth Toogood. Co-Chair, Hydrogen Delivery Council. For services to the Low Carbon Hydrogen Sector.
- Sara Louise Tough. Executive Director, Children's Services, Norfolk County Council. For services to Education and Children's Social Care.
- John Henry Trayner. Lately Managing Director, Go-Ahead London. For services to Transport, to Skills and to Education in London.
- Marcus Edward Trescothick. Mental Health Ambassador, Professional Cricketers' Association. For services to Mental Ill Health.
- Professor Joyce Ann Tyldesley. Professor of Egyptology, University of Manchester. For services to Egyptology and Heritage.
- Nicola Madeline van der Drift. Chief Executive, International Bomber Command Centre. For services to Heritage.
- Louise van der Straeten. Senior Lawyer, Serious Fraud Office. For services to the Administration of Justice.
- Vinaichandra Guduguntla Venkatesham. Chief Executive Officer, Arsenal Football Club. For services to Sport.
- Ewan Andrew Venters. Chief Executive, Hauser & Wirth and Chair, GREAT Private Sector Council. For services to International Trade.
- Robert Iain Wainwright. Founder, Doddie Aid. For voluntary and charitable services to the My Name'5 Doddie Foundation.
- Helen Ruth Waite. Deputy Director, Family Support, Department for Education. For services to Education.
- Professor Mark Watson-Gandy. Chair, Biometrics and Forensics Ethics Group. For Public and Voluntary Services.
- Dr. David Clark Watt. Chair, Fife College. For services to the Economy, to Sport and to Education.
- Lieutenant Colonel (Rtd) David Ian Whimpenny. Lately Board Trustee, The Royal British Legion. For Voluntary Service.
- Stephen John Whitton. Head, Border Force Maritime Command, Home Office. For services to Maritime Border Security.
- Professor Mark Harvey Wilcox. Lately National Clinical Director for Infection Prevention and Control, NHS England and Chair, SAGE Sub-Committee on Hospital Onset Covid Infection. For services to Healthcare, particularly during Covid-19.
- Howard Wilkinson. Chairman, League Managers Association. For services to Association Football and to Charity.
- Yvonne Marie Wilks-O'Grady. Philanthropist and Co-Founder, Roots Magazine. For services to Media, to Publishing and to Charity.
- Professor Bryan Williams. Chair of Medicine, University College London and lately Director of Research, University College London Hospitals NHS Foundation Trust. For services to Medicine.
- Robert John Williamson, DL. Chief Executive, The Community Foundation Tyne and Wear and Northumberland. For Voluntary and Charitable Services.
- Stephen John Willmer. Lately Deputy Head France, Security Policy and Operations, Ministry of Defence. For services to Defence and to International Relations.
- Dr. Collin Whitfield Willson. Animal Welfare Veterinary Lead, Food Standards Agency. For services to Animal Welfare and to Veterinary Public Health in the Meat Industry.
- Christine Mary Windmill. Honorary Vice-President, TennisScotland. For services to Tennis.
- Rabbi Jonathan Wittenberg. Senior Rabbi, Masorti Judaism. For services to the Jewish Community and to Interfaith Relations.
- Carl Vivian Woodall. Lately Director of Facilities, House of Lords. For services to Parliament.
- Ian William James Woodroffe. Founder, easyfundraising. For services to Charitable Fundraising.
- Philip Graham Wynn. Chair, LEAF (Linking Environment and Farming). For services to Farming and to the Environment.
- Professor Julia Mary Yeomans FRS. Professor of Physics and Head, Rudolf Peierls Centre, University of Oxford. For services to Physics.
- Zehra Zaidi. For services to International Development, to Humanitarian Action and to Community Cohesion.
- Helen Margaret Zammit-Willson. Director, National Valuation Unit, Valuation Office Agency. For services to the Surveying Profession.

International list

- Richard Allan, Director and Chief Executive Officer, The Mentor Initiative. For services to victims of war and natural disasters.
- Robert Berry, Director, Financial Reporting Authority, Cayman Islands. For services to the UK Sanctions Regime and Global Financial Standards in the Cayman Islands.
- Dr Ruth Lawson, Development Director and Chargé d'Affaires, British Embassy Khartoum, Sudan. For services to International Development and British Foreign Policy.
- Kevin Billings, Honorary Group Captain, 601 (County of London) Squadron, Royal Auxiliary Air Force. For services to the Royal Air Force in the United States of America and the UK.
- Paul Britton, Chair, Tate Americas Foundation. For services to the arts and to philanthropy.
- Kevin Burke, Arts Philanthropist and Board Member, BAFTA Hong Kong Advisory Board. For services to charity and to philanthropy.
- Philip Hugh Davies, Principal, Philip Davies (Heritage and Planning) Ltd. For services to UK and Commonwealth Heritage.
- Luke Dearden, lately Political Counsellor, UK Delegation to NATO, Brussels, Belgium. For services to British Foreign and Security Policy.
- Duncan Edwards, Chief Executive Officer, BritishAmerican Business, and Honorary Director, The St. George's Society, New York, United States of America. For services to UK/US Trade relations and to charity.
- Lieutenant Colonel (Rtd) Michael Edwards, lately Senior Reports Officer, Ceasefire and Transitional Security Arrangements Monitoring and Verification Mechanism, Juba, South Sudan. For services to peace in South Sudan.
- Brian Hancock, Surgeon, Wythenshaw Hospital; Founding Member and Trustee, Uganda Childbirth Injury Fund. For services to surgery in Sub-Saharan Africa.
- Susan Hannam, Vice President, CUDECA Hospice Foundation, Spain. For services to palliative care and volunteering services in Spain.
- Laura Hickey, lately Director Multilateral and Human Rights, Foreign, Commonwealth and Development Office. For services to crisis management and British Foreign Policy.
- Katy Higginson, lately Deputy Head, Royal and Coronation Unit, Foreign, Commonwealth and Development Office. For services to British Foreign Policy, to International Development, and to the Coronation of Their Majesties The King and The Queen.
- Dr Andi Hoxhaj, Lecturer in Law (Assistant Professor of Law), University College London. For services to UK/Albania Relations.
- Professor Alan Jamieson, Director, Deep Sea Centre, University of Western Australia. For services to Marine Biology, Subsea Engineering and Exploration.
- Dipak Karadia, Team Leader, Foreign, Commonwealth and Development Office. For services to National Security.
- Haifa Al Kaylani, President and Founder, Arab International Women's Forum. For services to women, to young people, and to cultural relations between the UK and the countries of the Middle East and North Africa region.
- Moses Kirkconnell III, Member of Parliament for Cayman Brac West and Little Cayman, Cayman Islands. For services to the Caymanian People, to the Tourism Industry, and to District Administration in the Cayman Islands.
- Gabrielle Kirstein, Founder and Chief Executive Officer, Feeding Hong Kong. For services to the community and tackling food waste and food poverty in Hong Kong.
- Leona Lewis, Singer-Songwriter, Performer and Philanthropist. For services to Music and to Charity.
- Sarah Lingard, lately Head of Events, Royal and Coronation Unit, Foreign, Commonwealth and Development Office. For services to British Foreign Policy and to the Coronation of Their Majesties The King and The Queen.
- Lukas May, lately Deputy Director, Comprehensive and Progressive Agreement for Trans-Pacific Partnership, Department for Business and Trade. For services to International Trade.
- Kyron McMaster, Track and Field Athlete, British Virgin Islands. For services to Sport in the British Virgin Islands.
- Catherine O'Neill, lately Joint Head, Royal and Coronation Unit, Foreign, Commonwealth and Development Office. For services to British Foreign Policy and to the Coronation of Their Majesties The King and The Queen.
- Professor Nicholas Paton, Professor of Infectious Diseases, National University of Singapore and the London School of Hygiene and Tropical Medicine. For services to Global Health.
- Jacqueline Perkins, HM Ambassador, Minsk, Belarus. For services to British Foreign Policy.
- Ashley Pigott, Chairman and Managing Director, AJ Power, Northern Ireland. For services to UK Exports and Manufacturing.
- Lawrence Podesta, lately Chief Executive Officer, Gibraltar International Bank Ltd, Gibraltar. For services to Banking in Gibraltar.
- George Robinson, Deputy Director, Trade and Goods, Windsor Framework Taskforce, Foreign, Commonwealth and Development Office. For services to British Foreign Policy.
- Taban Shoresh, Genocide Survivor and Founder and Chief Executive Officer, The Lotus Flower. For services to Refugees and Displaced Conflict Survivors in the Kurdistan Region of Iraq.
- Professor Gareth Stansfield, Pro-Vice-Chancellor and Executive Dean, University of Exeter. For services to UK interests in Iraq.
- Michael Vidler, Solicitor, lately of Vidlers and Co Solicitors, Hong Kong. For services to Justice and to Human Rights in Hong Kong.
- Emma Walters, Head of Department, Foreign, Commonwealth and Development Office. For services to British Foreign Policy.
- Lieutenant Colonel (Rtd) Christopher Warren, Secretary General, Royal Commonwealth Ex-Services League. For services to Commonwealth Veterans.
- Colin Whorlow, Team Leader, Foreign, Commonwealth and Development Office. For services to National Security.

==== Member of the Order of the British Empire (MBE) ====
Military

- Commander Steven Andrews, Royal Navy, D257452S.
- Lieutenant Commander Ross Donald Balfour, Royal Navy, C040712E.
- Warrant Officer 1 James Adrian Cuthbert, Royal Marines, P047210N.
- Warrant Officer 1 Engineering Technician (Communication and Information Systems) Steven Gilbertson, Royal Navy, D242982T.
- Commander Martin John Howard, Royal Navy, C041681L.
- Lieutenant Commander Alexander Rowan Marsh, Royal Navy, 30033538.
- Commander Paul O'Dooley, Royal Naval Reserve, C900344D.
- Chief Petty Officer Engineering Technician (Marine Engineering) Michael John Stephens, Royal Navy, D258366B.
- Leading Seaman (Diver) Rory Edward Cartwright-Taylor, Royal Navy, 30050838.
- Lieutenant Sam David Thompson, Royal Navy, 30023663.
- Commander Roger Simon Wyness, Royal Navy, C037182G.
- Major John Edward BAILEFF, Royal Regiment of Artillery, 30121479.
- Major Allan Paul Beard, Intelligence Corps, 25132230.
- Sergeant Daniel Adam Powderham-Bissell, Intelligence Corps, 25179642.
- Lieutenant Colonel John George Bradbury, Corps of Royal Electrical and Mechanical Engineers, Army Reserve, 552247.
- Major (now Acting Lieutenant Colonel) Keith Michael Timothy Brooks, VR, Royal Regiment of Artillery, Army Reserve, 511819.
- Captain Barry Lee Byron, VR, General Service Corps, Army Reserve, 24751476.
- Captain Giles Alexander Leighton Clarke, The Royal Logistic Corps, 30082571.
- Major Lisa Jane Clarke, Adjutant General's Corps (Staff and Personnel Support Branch), W0815832.
- Major James Philip Dott, The Parachute Regiment, 30011021.
- Major Brian James Dupree, Royal Army Physical Training Corps, Army Reserve, 551069.
- Major Robert George Fellows, The Rifles, 564703.
- Major Toby Christian Foster, The Rifles, 30039908.
- Lieutenant Colonel Christopher Simon Garrard, Corps of Royal Engineers, 24775389.
- Major Alex Jonathon Glynn, Royal Regiment of Artillery, 30050302.
- Major Jason Arthur Evan Groves, The Royal Welsh, 24870156.
- Major Kamal Gurung, The Queen's Gurkha Signals, 21169129.
- Major Alexander Roy Hamilton, VR, Corps of Royal Engineers, Army Reserve, 557167.
- Major Peter Anthony Harrison, VR, The Royal Logistic Corps, Army Reserve, 24859413.
- Major Steven Ross Duncan Maguire, The Royal Irish Regiment, 25232971.
- Bombardier (now Acting Sergeant) Alicia Rhiannon Martin, Royal Regiment of Artillery, 30177630.
- Major Neil Alexander McClelland, Scots Guards, 24867941.
- Major Christopher James Patrick Murphy, The Blues and Royals (Royal Horse Guards and 1st Dragoons), 30039546.
- Corporal Tonderai Ndlela, Adjutant General's Corps (Staff and Personnel Support Branch), 30145012.
- Lieutenant Colonel Christopher David Newton, Royal Regiment of Artillery, 24826197.
- Private Ernest Chinazor Okenyi, The Royal Logistic Corps, 30330523.
- Major Stacy Leanne Oliver, Royal Army Medical Corps, 30133469.
- Captain Pierre Andrew Ozanne, The Princess of Wales's Royal Regiment/The Ranger Regiment, 30277687.
- Lieutenant Colonel Daniel Sambrooke Proctor, Corps of Royal Electrical and Mechanical Engineers, 24781852.
- Staff Sergeant Matthew Francis Robinson, Corps of Royal Engineers, Army Reserve, 25099098.
- Major Charles Karu Singleton, The Princess of Wales's Royal Regiment, 565366.
- Staff Sergeant Charlotte Louise Spence, Royal Army Physical Training Corps, W1060016.
- Major Jonathan Grant Studwell, Intelligence Corps, 30170101.
- Major Thomas Daniel Sweeney, Army Air Corps, 24757307.
- Sergeant Edward William Swindell, VR, Corps of Royal Engineers, Army Reserve, 30150063.
- Major Francesca Louise Sykes, Royal Regiment of Artillery, 30067880.
- Lieutenant Colonel Andrew James Teeton, Corps of Royal Engineers, 536346.
- Major (now Acting Lieutenant Colonel) James Viney, Corps of Royal Engineers, 25185183.
- Captain (now Acting Major) David Edward Williams, Corps of Royal Electrical and Mechanical Engineers, 24929032.
- Master Aircrew Oliver Martin Dewey, Royal Air Force, 30060196.
- Sergeant (now Acting Flight Sergeant) George Joseph Downey, Royal Air Force, L8516771.
- Wing Commander Sam Haley, Royal Air Force, 30000089.
- Squadron Leader James Duncan Hemingfield, Royal Air Force, 8700294K.
- Sergeant Martin John Henderson, Royal Air Force, 30112261.
- Squadron Leader Sharon Ingle, Royal Air Force, 30091084.
- Flight Sergeant (now Acting Warrant Officer) Stewart Marcus Jackson, Royal Air Force, F8427999.
- Flight Sergeant Philip Kipling, Royal Air Force, D8411323.
- Squadron Leader Kevin Charles William March, Royal Air Force, 30035301.
- Squadron Leader Christopher Scott Middleton, Royal Air Force, 2642751S.
- Squadron Leader Mark Shipley, Royal Air Force, 30001963.
- Warrant Officer Garry John Stanton, Royal Air Force, K8421673.
- Flying Officer (now Acting Wing Commander) Robert Charles Timothy, Royal Air Force, 30389992.

Civil

- Enass Abo Hamed. Co-Founder and Chief Executive Officer, H2GO Power. For services to Engineering and to Enterprise.
- Dr. Helen Mary Abrahams (Helen Pain). Chief Executive, Royal Society of Chemistry and lately Chair, Board of Trustees, Science Council. For services to Science.
- Sheila Ann Abrahams. Founder, Freelance Hairdressers' Association. For services to the Hairdressing Industry.
- Gerald Ronald Joseph Adams. For voluntary services to the community in Barry, Glamorgan.
- Bayo Adelaja. Founder and Chief Executive Officer, Do It Now Now. For services to Social Mobility, to Financial Inclusion and to Entrepreneurship.
- Dr. Olurotimi Babatunde Adesanya. Founder and Chair, African and Caribbean Dental Association UK and Principal Dentist, Watling Street Dental Care. For services to Oral Health.
- Taslima Parveen Ahmad. Founder, Creative Design and Manufacture UK. For services to Disadvantaged People and to the Minority Ethnic Community.
- Shabnam Ahmed Butt. Lead for Adult Safeguarding, Camden London Borough Council. For services to Social Care.
- Jill Alcock (Jill Clewes). Founder, Jill Clewes Academy for Theatre Arts. For services to the Arts and to Charity.
- Michael Allen. Principal, Lisneal College. For services to Education.
- Ethel Gloria Anderson. For services to the community in St Ann's, Nottingham.
- Samuel James Anderson. Founder and Chief Executive, IceMOS Technology. For services to Economic Development in Northern Ireland.
- Colin Trevor Whitney Angel. Lately Policy and Campaigns Director, United Kingdom Homecare Association. For services to Domiciliary Care.
- Andrew David Arbuckle. Trustee and Fundraiser, Royal Scottish Agricultural Benevolent Institution. For services to Farming and to the community in Fife.
- Sarah Elizabeth Armitage. Chair of Trustees, Embark Federation. For services to Education.
- Paul Robert Arnold. Deputy Chief Executive and Chief Operating Officer, Information Commissioner's Office. For services to Regulation and to Equality, Diversity and Inclusion.
- Keith Alan Ashcroft. Lately Area Director, Environment Agency. For services to the Environment.
- Simon Edward Ayers. Chief Executive Officer, TrustMark. For services to Consumer Protection.
- Jannella Baker. Training Officer, Berkshire Search and Rescue Dogs, Lowland Rescue. For services to Search and Rescue.
- David Martin James Ball. For services to the community in East Anglia.
- Sarah Pamela Ballantine. For Charitable Fundraising in Northern Ireland.
- Tajinder Kaur Banwait. Founder, Urban Apothecary London. For services to Business and to the Beauty Industry.
- Timothy Paul Barnes. Chair, St George's Garrison Church Trust. For services to the community in the Royal Borough of Greenwich, London.
- Dr. Catherine Emma Baxter. University Secretary, Harper Adams University. For services to Higher Education.
- Gina Beard. Lead Cancer Nurse, Hywel Dda University Health Board. For services to Cancer Nursing.
- Robert Duncan Beaumont. Lately Governor, Ravenscliffe High School and Sports College, Halifax. For services to School Governance and to Children and Young People with Special Educational Needs.
- Nigel Gavin Begg. Founder, Aspire Technology Solutions. For services to Digital and Technology Industry Growth in North East England.
- Lynda Janet Suzanne Bennett. For services to Hockey in Wales.
- Trudy Helen Berlet. Lately Lead Midwife for Bereavement Care, Worcestershire Acute Hospitals NHS Trust. For services to Midwifery.
- Professor Miriam Bernard. Professor Emerita, Social Gerontology, Keele University. For services to Ageing Research and to Older People.
- Jane Alison Betsworth. Headteacher, Millfields Community School, London Borough of Hackney. For services to Education.
- Dr. Sanjay Bhandari. Chair, Kick It Out. For services to Sport.
- Dr. Manav Bhavsar. Lately Clinical Lead, Critical Care. For services to Healthcare, particularly during Covid-19.
- Helen Binns. Manager, Families First Team, Leeds City Council. For services to Vulnerable People.
- Amanda Jayne Bird. Senior Supply Chain Coordinator, Leidos Europe Limited. For services to Defence Logistics.
- Zachary Birks. Team Leader, Ministry of Defence. For services to Defence.
- Professor Anthony John Bjourson. Emeritus Professor of Genomics and lately Director, Northern Ireland Centre for Stratified Medicine, Ulster University. For services to Higher Education and to Research.
- Anthony Grant Bloom. Chairman, Brighton and Hove Albion Football Club. For services to Association Football and to the community in Brighton.
- Anthony John Bloxham. Member, National Teaching School Council and Lead, South-West National Teaching School Council Representative. For services to Education.
- Chitralekha Bolar. Dancer, Choreographer and Teacher. For services to South Asian Dance.
- Emily Josephine Bolton. Founder, Our Future. For services to Social Mobility.
- Thomas Stewart Bosworth. For services to Race Walking.
- Richard James Bottomley. Headteacher, Bradford Alternative Provision Academy. For services to Vulnerable Children and Young People.
- James David Boyes. Team UK Gold Medal Winner, WorldSkills UK. For services to Further Education.
- Nicholas Boys Smith. Founder and Director, Create Streets and Chair, Office for Place. For services to Planning and Design.
- Samuel James Braddick. For services to the community in Gillingham, Dorset.
- Mark Richard Brett. For services to Charity and to the community in Wallingford, Oxfordshire.
- Anne Brewster. 50 Plus Lead, Yorkshire and the Humber, Department for Work and Pensions. For services to the Welfare of Older People.
- Debbie Hazel Brown. Advanced Nurse Practitioner and Clinical Director, Lewisham Community Education Provider Network Training Hub. For services to Nursing and the NHS.
- Joanna Esther Brown (Joanna Cram). Lately Chair, Scottish Osteopathic Society. For services to Musculoskeletal Healthcare in Scotland.
- Patricia Ann Brown. Director and Founder, Central. For services to the Built Environment.
- Penelope Jane Brown. For services to Charity and to the community in Salisbury, Wiltshire.
- Sara Margaret Browne (Sally Browne). For services to the Arts and to the community in Southend-on-Sea, Essex.
- Dr. Alasdair Cunningham Bruce. Boston Spa Renewed Programme Manager. For services to Libraries.
- Christopher John Paul Bryant. Director of Tournaments and Events, Football Association. For services to Sport.
- Jennifer Sheridan Bryer. Teacher, Pony Club. For services to Horse Riding.
- Peter George Buchan. Managing Director, Shipping, Nuclear Transport Solutions. For services to the Nuclear Industry and to Young People.
- Khumi Tonsing Burton, JP, DL. For services to the community in Manchester and Cheshire.
- Ronald Butler. Policy Adviser, Department for Work and Pensions. For services to Disadvantaged People.
- Carrie Byrom. Director, Stable Lives. For services to Mental Health and the community in North West England.
- David Corrie Calvert. President, Langholm Town Band. For services to the community in Langholm, Dumfries.
- Carl Campbell. Founder and Artistic Director, CCDC7. For services to African Caribbean Dance Education and Culture.
- Catriona Yvonne Fiona Campbell. UK&I Chief Technology and Innovation Officer, EY. For services to Technology and Innovation.
- George Alan Carney. Executive Officer, Department for Education. For Public Service.
- Professor Kathryn Janice Carruthers. Professor of French Linguistics, Queen's University Belfast. For services to Modern Languages.
- Kathryn Melanie Keele Caton. Founder and Managing Director, Brighton Gin. For services to Trade and to the community in Brighton.
- Amanda Chadwick. Founder and Trustee, Pyjama Fairies. For services to Children in Hospital.
- Edward Kay Kiu Chan. Co-Founder and Co-Chair, Chinese Welfare Trust and Trustee, Islington Chinese Association. For services to the Chinese Community in London.
- Philip Richard Chandler. For services to the community in Herefordshire.
- Patrick Chapman. For services to the Creative Industries and to Higher Education.
- Robert Christie. Head Coach, Scotland Paralympic Lawn Bowls Team. For services to Lawn Bowls.
- Michael Cladingbowl. For services to Education.
- David McCrorie Shearer Clark. School Support Officer, Aberdeenshire Council. For services to Education.
- Emilia Isobel Euphemia Rose Clarke. Co-Founder and Trustee, SameYou. For services to People with Brain Injuries.
- Jennifer Susan Dodd Clarke. Co-Founder and Chief Executive Officer, SameYou. For services to People with Brain Injuries.
- Gillian Petrina Clayton. Intelligence Led Programme Manager, Environment Agency. For services to Environmental Crime, Enforcement and Intelligence.
- William Cleere. Committee Member, Berkshire and Buckinghamshire Referees Association. For services to the community in Buckinghamshire.
- David Clifford. Fundraiser, Macmillan Cancer Support. For services to Charitable Fundraising in Clackmannanshire.
- David Lampton Grey Cochrane. Head of Forensic Social Work, Forensic Mental Health and High Secure Care, West London NHS Trust. For services to Health and Social Care.
- Joan Lorna Jeannette Cocking. Chair of Governors, Kent College Canterbury. For services to Education.
- Justin Anthony Cohen. News Editor, Jewish News. For services to Holocaust Remembrance and to the Jewish Community.
- Robert George Coles. Lately Intelligence Officer, Home Office. For services to Border Security.
- The Reverend Christopher Richard Colledge. For services to the community in Bournemouth, Dorset.
- Alan Collier. Director, Procurement and Sustainability, Norfolk County Council. For services to Local Government.
- Dr. Michael Patrick Collins. Lately Science Lead on EU and International Science Partnerships, Department for Environment, Food and Rural Affairs. For services to International Science Policy.
- Denise Cooke. Administrative Officer, Maritime and Coastguard Agency. For Public Service.
- Laura Coryton. Tampon Tax Campaigner, Author and Co-Founder, Sex Ed Matters. For services to Charitable Campaigning.
- Margaret Irene Cosin. Lately Member, Dover District Council. For Political and Public Service.
- Stuart Samuel Cossar. Investigation Manager, Police Service of Scotland. For services to the Investigation and to the Bereaved Families of the Lockerbie Air Disaster.
- Anne Marie Coulter. Volunteer, Summerhill Community Centre. For services to the community in Dumfries.
- Samuel Robert John Cousley. Head of Seafarers, Department for Transport. For services to Seafarers.
- Professor Rachel Elizabeth Cowgill. Professor of Music, University of York. For services to Culture, to Education and to the Arts.
- John Hubert Cox. Chair, Joseph Cox Charity. For services to Homeless People in Manchester.
- Maureen Joan Cox. For charitable services in the London Borough of Hackney.
- Vanessa Sara Crocker. Co-Founder, Spread a Smile. For services to Seriously and Terminally Ill Children and their Families.
- Daniel Steven Paul Croft. Chief Executive Officer, Key Assets Europe. For services to Fostering.
- Rowan Edwin Crozier. Chief Executive Officer, C Brandauer & Co. For services to Manufacturing and Enterprise.
- Dr. Donald Murray Cruickshank. General Practitioner, Upper Deeside. For services to the Medical Profession and to the community of Braemar, Aberdeenshire.
- Diana Jane Andrews Cunningham. Peer Trainer, Sussex Recovery College. For services to Mental Health.
- Suzette Louise Davenport, QPM. Chair, National Driver Offending Retraining Scheme. For services to Road Safety.
- Jessica Miriam Bryson Davidson. Senior Clinical Forensic Charge Nurse. For services to Forensic Nursing and to Victim Support in Scotland.
- Donna Marie Dawber. News and Campaigns Manager, Merseyside Police. For services to Law and Order.
- Dr. Edward James Day. Clinical Reader in Addiction Psychiatry, University of Birmingham. For services to Vulnerable People.
- Shaun Andrew Day. Headteacher, The Unicorn School, Abingdon, Oxfordshire. For services to Education.
- Paula Rosemary Deas. Deputy Chief Executive, Coventry and Warwickshire Local Enterprise Partnership. For services to the community in the West Midlands.
- Keith Deller. For charitable services to the community in Suffolk.
- Jack Robert Clarke Deverson. Co-Founder and Managing Director, Evidence Based Education. For services to Education.
- Ruth Heather Devine. Route Panel Member, Institute for Apprenticeships and Technical Education. For services to Further Education and Apprenticeships.
- Deborah Heather Dixon (Deborah Williams). For services to the community in Poole, Dorset.
- Francis Joseph Donnelly. For services to Disability Sport and to the community in Northern Ireland.
- Nilesh Bhasker Dosa. Founder, icanyoucantoo. For services to Social Equality.
- George David Dowell. Owner, Worthing Football Club. For services to Association Football and to Disability Awareness.
- Elissa Rebecca Louise Downie. For services to Gymnasts and to the Sport of Gymnastics.
- Rebecca Lauren Downie. For services to Gymnasts and to the Sport of Gymnastics.
- Spencer Drury. Lately Councillor, Royal Borough of Greenwich. For Political and Public Service.
- James Michael Duffy. Lately Child Protection Manager, Lothian and Borders Police and Police Service of Scotland. For services to Children.
- Giles Duley. Founder, Legacy of War Foundation. For services to Survivors of Conflict.
- Mary Alexandra Earps. For services to Association Football.
- Dr. Gillian Mary Eatough. Lately Chief Executive Officer, Learning Community Trust. For services to Education.
- Captain Thomas David Eccles. Fisheries Officer, Department of Agriculture, Environment and Rural Affairs. For services to Fisheries, Environment and to Maritime Safety.
- Linda Jacqueline Edmunds. Consultant Nurse, Heart Failure and Cardiac Rehabilitation, Aneurin Bevan University Health Board. For services to Cardiac Rehabilitation and Heart Failure.
- Professor Anthony David Edwards. Professor of Paediatrics and Neonatal Medicine, King's College London. For services to Health Research.
- Huw William Edmond Edwards. Founder Member, Monmouth Male Voice Choir. For services to Music and to Charity.
- Dr. Alice Elizabeth Ellis (Alice Hartley). Consultant Urologist, South Tyneside and Sunderland NHS Foundation Trust. For services to the NHS.
- Dr. Benjamin Marc Ellis. For services to Healthcare, to Equality and to the Jewish Community.
- Audley Horace English. Co-Founder, Society of Black Architects. For services to Architecture and Sustainability.
- Professor Stephen James Weston Evans. Emeritus Professor of Pharmacoepidemiology, London School of Hygiene and Tropical Medicine. For services to the Safety of Medicines.
- Stephen Wynne Evans. Founder, Belief. For voluntary and charitable services in North Wales.
- Helen Adesuwa Imatitkua Fadipe. Founder and Chair, BAME Planners Network. For services to Town Planning.
- Paul Fairweather. Trustee, Breakthrough Ltd. For services to Disabled People and to the LGBT Community in the North West.
- Catherine Susan, Baroness Fall. Lately Non Executive Director, Cultural Recovery Board. For services to Culture.
- Rhiane Estelle Fatinikun. Founder, Black Girls Hike. For services to Nature and to Diversity.
- Julie Patricia Felix. For services to Dance Education.
- James St John Fenny. Head of Office, Public Defender Service and Transplant Surgery Ambassador. For services to Criminal Justice and to Organ Donor Awareness.
- Dr. Julia Helen Fentem. Executive Vice President, Safety, Environmental and Regulatory Science, Unilever. For services to Human Health and Animal Welfare.
- Jacqueline Ferguson. President, London College of Dance Network and Volunteer, Healthwatch (Kensington and Chelsea). For services to the community in London.
- Lucy Catherine Ferguson. Founder and Director, Mediorite. For services to Social Enterprise and the Creative Industries.
- Ivora Maria Ferreria-Bean. Team Manager, Birmingham Children's Trust. For services to Children and Families.
- Malcolm Ernest Ferris-Lay. Trustee, Tea Trade Benevolent Society and Scottish Tartan Authority. For Charitable Service.
- Maxine Jane Ficarra (Maxine Purdie). Lately Chief Executive Officer, PraxisAuril. For services to Knowledge Exchange.
- Margaret Ruth Fingerhut. For services to Music and to Charitable Fundraising.
- David Edward Clarke Finlay. For services to Olympic Wrestling in Northern Ireland.
- Stephen Fischbacher. Founding Director, Fischy Music. For services to Mental Health and Well-Being.
- Alison Fordy. Proprietor, Alison Radcliffe School of Dance. For services to Young People and to the community in Middlesbrough, North Yorkshire.
- Alison Fotheringham. Appeals and Litigation Assistant Director, Home Office. For Public and Voluntary Service.
- Alison Jane France. Operational Leader, Department for Work and Pensions. For services to Disadvantaged People.
- Susan Elizabeth Francis. Principal Educational Psychologist and Strategic Lead for Children and Young People's Emotional Wellbeing and Mental Health, Enfield London Borough Council. For services to Children with Special Educational Needs and Disabilities.
- Mike Anthony Frankl. For services to Charity, to Homeless People and to the Jewish Community in Cambridge.
- Pamela Marguerita Frickleton. Foster Carer, Plymouth City Council. For services to Young People.
- Peter Thornton Frickleton. Foster Carer, Plymouth City Council. For services to Young People.
- Raymond Ashley Fulton. For services to Music in Northern Ireland.
- Dr. Christine Paula Futter. Lately Chief Operating Officer, Norfolk and Suffolk Care Support Ltd. For services to Adult Social Care.
- Jacqueline Mary Gange. Volunteer, Cannock Chase Advice Centre. For services to the community in Cannock, Staffordshire.
- Nicholas George Anthony Gardner. For charitable services in Scotland.
- William Thomas Gavan. Mayor, Sandwell Council. For Political and Public Service, and to the LGBT+ Community.
- Deborah Gillian Greenslade Geany. Senior Case Manager, Personnel Recovery Unit Wales and West, Ministry of Defence. For services to Military Personnel.
- Syed Jason Andrew Ghaboos. Deputy Director, Civil Service Employee Experience, Cabinet Office. For Public Service.
- Professor Panagiotis Giannoudis. Professor of Trauma and Orthopaedics, University of Leeds and Founder, Day One Trauma Support. For services to Trauma and Orthopaedic Surgery.
- Dr. Dinendra Singh Gill. For services to Pre-Hospital and Trauma Care in Wales.
- Charity Gladstone. Lately Matron of Cardiology and Respiratory Services, Gloucestershire Hospitals NHS Foundation Trust. For services to Nursing.
- Jill Sylvia Gladwell. Poppy Appeal Collector. For voluntary services to the Royal British Legion in Suffolk.
- Judith Anne Godden. Head of Casework, Constituency Office of Tim Farron MP. For services to the community in Westmorland and Lonsdale, Cumbria.
- Dr. Claire Mairead Goodman. Professor of Health Care Research, Centre for Research in Public Health and Community Care, University of Hertfordshire. For services to Older People.
- Dr. Gian Parkash Gopal. Founder, Oxford Hindu Temple and Community Centre Project. For services to the Hindu Community and to Multi-Faith Cohesion in Oxfordshire.
- Elizabeth Jane Gorb. Director of Apprenticeships, Manchester Metropolitan University. For services to Education and Skills.
- Permjit Gosal (Pam Gosal), MSP. Member of the Scottish Parliament for West Scotland. For services to Business, to Racial Equality and to Charity in Milton Keynes.
- David James Connelly Graham. National Director, Care Leavers Association. For services to Care Leavers.
- Sarah Jane Vandevelde Graham. Founder, Hilltops Ukrainian Support Community. For services to Ukrainian Refugees.
- The Reverend Canon Terence Kevin Declan Graham, DL. Rector, St Bartholomew's Church, Belfast. For services to the Reserve Forces and to the community in Belfast.
- Julie Grant. Deputy Director, News and Digital, Scottish Government. For services to Scotland on the Demise of Her Majesty Queen Elizabeth II.
- Dr. Simon Jonathon Grant. Technical Director, Thomas Swan. For services to Diversity in the Chemical Industry.
- Belinda Elizabeth Gray. Founder, Art for Cure. For services to Breast Cancer Charities.
- Julie Heather Gray. Founder, Adventure Activities for All Abilities. For services to Children with Impairments in Nottinghamshire.
- Neil Jonathan Greenwood. Executive Director, Finance and Corporate Services, Natural History Museum. For services to Museums.
- Robert Terence Grey. Lately Boxing Gym Owner and Trainer, Gwent Amateur Boxing Club. For services to Amateur Boxing in Swansea.
- Dr. John Michael Grimshaw. Director, Yorkshire Arboretum. For services to Tree Health and Plant Conservation.
- Liam Daniel Hackett. Founder and Chief Executive Officer, Ditch the Label. For services to Young People.
- Elizabeth Hall. Founder, The Hygiene Bank. For services to Tackling Hygiene Poverty.
- Penelope Evelyn Hall (Penelope Gravill). Speech and Language Therapist, Aberdeen Royal Infirmary. For services to the Treatment of Skull Base Tumours and Facial Palsies.
- Zahid Hamid. Lately Member, Peak District National Park Authority. For services to National Parks.
- Dr. Simon Leslie Hancock. Councillor, Pembrokeshire County Council. For services to the community in Pembrokeshire.
- Adam Peter Ritchie Handling. Chef, Ambassador of The GREAT Britain and Northern Ireland Campaign. For services to Hospitality and International Trade.
- Richard Heafield Harris. Fintech Innovator and Entrepreneur, Ensygnia (Onescan). For services to Fintech Innovation and to Global Technological Advancement.
- Valda Harris (Valda Jackson). Artist. For services to Art.
- Lesley Ann Hastings. For services to the community in Leeds, West Yorkshire.
- Philip Hugh Michael Haughton. Founder, Better Food. For services to Sustainable Food Initiatives and to the community in Bristol.
- Elizabeth Ann Hawkins. For services to Young People and to the community in Wirral, Merseyside.
- Lauren May Hemp. Footballer. For services to Association Football.
- Alasdair Cunningham Hendry. Senior Operations Manager, Forestry Commission. For services to Forestry and to Climate Change Mitigation.
- Alice Maria Hendy. Founder, R;pple Suicide Prevention Charity. For services to Online Safety.
- Nathaniel Timothy Hepburn. Director and Chief Executive, Charleston. For services to the Arts.
- Ian Leslie Hewitt. Lately Chairman, All England Lawn Tennis Club. For services to Tennis and to Charity.
- Dr. Alison Maynard Hill. Chair, Bikeability Trust, and Chair, Cyclox. For services to Cycling.
- Daniel Peter Hill. Director, Daddys with Angels. For charitable services to Bereaved Families.
- Nicholas Andrew Hill. National Conservation Projects Manager. For services to Heritage.
- Martyn Paul Hillier. Founder, Micropub Association. For services to Business and to Hospitality.
- Geraldine Hills. Founder, Manchester Parent Champions. For services to Children and Young People with Special Educational Needs and Disabilities.
- Stuart William Hogg. For services to Rugby Union Football.
- Paul Hollywood. Baker and Television Presenter. For services to Baking and to Broadcasting.
- Helen Holtam. Tutor, Friends of Erlestoke Prison, Origami Inside. For services to Prisoners.
- Glennis Edith Hooper. For Charitable Services to People with Breast Cancer.
- Susan Hornby. Co-Founder and Head Teacher, The Bridge School Malvern. For services to Disadvantaged Children.
- Helen Housby. For services to Netball.
- Joslyn Hoyte-Smith. Chair, GB Olympians Association. For services to Athletics.
- Ian Russell Hughes. Director of Policy, Local Government Association. For services to Local Government.
- Air Commodore Paul Jonathan Hughesdon. Lately Director of Welfare, Royal Air Force Benevolent Fund. For services to Veterans.
- Christopher Neil Hunter Gordon. Chairman, Resources for Autism. For services to People with Autism and their Families.
- Anoushé Husain. Ambassador, Ehlers Danlos Support UK, LimbPower and Disability Champion. For services to People with Disabilities.
- Neil Rankin Hutchison. Lately Engineer, Roche Diagnostics. For services to Laboratory Engineering.
- Dorothy Jeanne Hyett. Regional Access and Bridleway Officer for Wales, British Horse Society. For services to Horse Riders and Horse Welfare.
- Helen Louise Hyndman. Service Coordinator, Ask Eve, The Eve Appeal. For charitable services to Women with Gynaecological Cancers.
- Lydia Anna Obat Ina. Foster Carer and Founder, Gapolunya Foundation. For services to Vulnerable Children.
- Kenneth Ince. Scout Leader, 1st Golborne (St Thomas) Scout Group. For services to Young People in the Metropolitan Borough of Wigan.
- Sheila Ince. Cub Scout Leader, 1st Golborne (St Thomas) Scout Group. For services to Young People in the Metropolitan Borough of Wigan.
- Hazel Irvine. Sports Presenter, Honorary President, Enable Scotland. For services to Sport and to Charity.
- Leslie John Raymond Irvine. International Referee Assessor, Irish Football Association. For services to Association Football.
- Azara Issifu. Independent Family Group Conference Coordinator, London Borough of Camden. For services to Children and Families, and to the community in the London Borough of Camden.
- Douglas Michael Jackson. For services to the community in Sheffield, South Yorkshire.
- Christine May Jackson. Headteacher, Glasllwch County Primary School, Newport. For services to Education.
- Sabit Jakupović. Member, Genocide Survivors' Consultative Group, Holocaust Memorial Day Trust. For services to Genocide Education and Commemoration.
- Janis Lindy James. Founder, Good Egg Child Safety Campaign. For services to Children's Road Safety.
- Dr. Muhayman Jamil. Founder, Wheels and Wheelchairs. For services to People with Disabilities.
- Rizwan Javed. Station Assistant, MTR Elizabeth Line. For services to Vulnerable People.
- Thomas Andrew Raynes Jenkins. For services to the Forestry Sector.
- Professor Antony Johansen. Consultant Ortho-Geriatrician, Cardiff and Vale University Health Board. For services to Older People.
- Dr. Joseph John Galliano (Joseph Galliano-Doig). Director and Co-Founder, Queer Britain. For services to Heritage, to Charity, and to Diversity and Inclusion.
- Melanie Sharon John-Ross. Lately Service Director, Children's Social Care and Safeguarding. For services to Children and Families in Barnsley, South Yorkshire.
- Nicholas Edward Johnson. Co-Founder and Director, Market Operations. For services to Business and to the Food Sector.
- Professor Deborah Zerena Johnston. Deputy Vice-Chancellor, London South Bank University. For services to Stammering Recognition in Higher Education.
- The Reverend Derek James Johnston. Lead Chaplain, Belfast Health and Social Care Trust. For services to Chaplaincy and Well-Being during Covid-19.
- Ian Malcolm Jones. For services to Education in Merseyside.
- Dr. Peter Simpson Jones. Lead Specialist Advisor for Peatlands, Natural Resources Wales. For services to Welsh Peatlands and to the community in Wales.
- Shann Erin Jones. Director, Chuckling Goat. For services to Charity and to Innovation in Wales.
- Evelyn Mary Joy. Agent, Buckingham Conservative Association. For Political and Public Service.
- James Michael Keggen. Coxswain, Port St Mary Lifeboat Station, Royal National Lifeboat Institution. For voluntary services to Maritime Safety.
- Sharon Elaine Kelly. Project Manager, Royston Youth Action. For services to Young People.
- Lindsey Kemp. Officer, National Crime Agency. For services to Law Enforcement.
- Maurice Joseph Kennedy. Volunteer, Transport Training Board. For services to the Transport and Logistics Industries of Northern Ireland and Great Britain.
- Christine Anne Kenyon. Deputy Principal, The Manchester College, Greater Manchester. For services to Further Education.
- Michael Kettle. Explosives Officer, Metropolitan Police Service. For services to Bomb Disposal.
- Helen Morag Keys. Entrepreneur, Queen's University's Students' Union. For services to Entrepreneurship and Innovation in Farming.
- Jasdeep Hari Bhajan Singh Khalsa. Founder, The Sikher Project. For charitable services to the Sikh Community.
- Professor Saye Hock Khoo. Professor of Pharmacology and Therapeutics, University of Liverpool. For services to Infectious Diseases and Pharmacology.
- Virginia Kiddle. Officer, National Crime Agency. For services to Law Enforcement.
- Amy Kilby. UK Representative, International Project Management Organisation. For services to Military Communications.
- James Kilpatrick. Chair, RVH Liver Support Group. For services to People with Liver Disease and their Carers in Northern Ireland.
- Charline Zephoria King. Head, Children and Young People's Service, The Rathbone Society. For services to Young People.
- Penelope Anne Kirby. For services to Mountain Rescue in the Lake District.
- Henry James Kissock. Information and Communication Technology Service Delivery Manager, Police Service of Northern Ireland. For services to the community in Northern Ireland.
- Melissa Kose. Emerging Talent Manager, British Airways. For services to Early Careers in Aviation.
- Mostaque Ahmed Koyes. Director, Community Interest Luton. For services to the community in Luton, Bedfordshire.
- Anna Ruth Ella Lapwood. Organist. For services to Music.
- Harriet Hannah Laurie. Founder, TheHorseCourse. For services to Disadvantaged People in Dorset.
- Jayne Anne Law. Lately Head of Honours and the Kings Award for Voluntary Service, Department for Culture, Media and Sport. For Public Service.
- Dr. Fenella Kate Leach (Fenella Wrigley). Chief Medical Officer and Deputy Chief Executive, London Ambulance Service NHS Trust. For services to the NHS.
- Helen Margaret Leadbitter. For services to Young Carers.
- Aryeh Leaman. For services to Young People and to the community in Hendon, London Borough of Barnet.
- Jeremy James Lee. Chef. For services to the Food Industry.
- David Levy. Senior Community Outreach Adviser, Ukraine Humanitarian Taskforce, Department for Levelling Up, Housing and Communities. For services to Refugee Resettlement.
- Andrew Colin MacDuff Liddell. Lately Charity Lawyer, Pitlochry. For services to Theatre and the Arts in Scotland.
- Fiona Ann Lindop. Specialist Physiotherapist in Parkinson's Disease, University Hospitals of Derby and Burton NHS Foundation Trust. For services to Physiotherapy.
- Brenda Anne Lines. Chair, Big Local DY10. For services to the community in Kidderminster, Worcestershire.
- Richard John Linley. Lately Senior Inspector of Courses, British Horseracing Authority. For services to Horse Racing.
- Antony Lishak. Chief Executive, Learning from the Righteous. For services to Holocaust Education.
- Sharon Louise Livermore. Founder, Domestic Abuse Education and Director, Kameo Recruitment. For services to the Victims of Domestic Abuse.
- Shalom Ijeoma Lloyd. Director, Naturally Tiwa Skincare. For services to International Trade and to Women in Business.
- Dr. Leonard Malcolm Lofts. Patron and Lately Chief Executive, Northam Care Trust. For services to People with Disabilities in Devon.
- Joanne Elizabeth Loftus. Lately Civil Secretary, Ministry of Defence. For services to Defence.
- Louise Long. Chief Executive, Inverclyde Council. For services to Local Government and to the community in Inverclyde, Renfrewshire.
- Maria Victoria Rodriguez Lopez. Head of Partnerships, Scottish Government. For services to Minority Ethnic Communities in Scotland during Covid-19.
- Paul John Lord. Director of Sport and Senior Leader, Westcroft Special School. For services to Children and Young People with Special Educational Needs.
- Andrew McLauchlan Lothian. Founder and Director, Insights Learning and Development. For services to Personal and Professional Development.
- Dickon Rutherford Love. For services to Bell-Ringing in London and Kent.
- Miriam Luke. President, Henley Rowing Club and lately Chair, Henley Women's Regatta. For services to Women's Rowing.
- Martin Edward Machray. Executive Director of Performance, NHS England, London. For services to Healthcare.
- Malcolmina Mackay Macleod. Social and Health Carer. For services to the community of North Uist, Scotland.
- Professor Roma Maguire. Professor of Digital Health and Care, University of Strathclyde. For services to Health Care Research.
- Helen Ann Maitland. Lately National Director for Urgent and Unscheduled Care, Scottish Government. For services to NHS Scotland.
- Eric Malcomson. Founder and Chair, Tove Valley Broadband. For services to the community in the Tove Valley, Northamptonshire.
- Robert James Hammond Malcomson. Deputy Director, Cabinet Office. For public and voluntary service to the LGBTQ+ Community and to Homeless People.
- Sharon Manning. Cancer Nurse Specialist, Macmillan. For services to Cancer Patient Care.
- Deirdre Marshall. Team Leader, Ministry of Defence. For services to Defence.
- Kathryn Julia Marshall. Senior Manager, Lloyds Banking Group, Halifax. For services to Further Education and Skills.
- Robert James Martin. For services to Drama in Northern Ireland.
- Elsie Barbara Martlew. Lately Deputy Leader, City of Carlisle Council. For Political and Public Service.
- Paul Nicholas Martynenko. Vice-President, Registration and Standards, BCS, The Chartered Institute for IT. For services to the Information Technology Industry.
- Sarah Mason. Chief Executive Officer, Women's Aid Federation Northern Ireland. For services to Women and Girls.
- Dennis Richard Abercrombie Matheson. Chair, Tenant Farmers Association Cymru. For services to the Tenanted Agricultural Sector in Wales.
- Zamanganga Mbatha. Head of Profound and Multiple Learning Disabilities, Royal Docks Academy. For services to Teenagers with Learning Difficulties in the London Borough of Newham.
- Hugh McAninch. Lately Regional Coordinator, The Compassionate Friends. For services to Bereaved Families in Scotland.
- Elizabeth McCrory. Regional Lead, UK Export Finance. For services to Exporting Businesses in Northern Ireland.
- Gordon Stirling McIntyre. Founder and Chair, Hospitality Health. For services to the Tourism and Hospitality Industry in Scotland.
- Gwyneth Kathleen McKenzie. Team District Commissioner, Hadrian District, Scout Association. For services to Young People and to the community in Northumberland, North Tyneside and Newcastle upon Tyne.
- James Ian McLean. Deputy Chief Nurse, Programme Delivery, Health Education England. For services to Nursing.
- Robert William McVeigh. For services to the Commonwealth Games in Northern Ireland.
- Donna Elaine McWilliams. Deputy Group Co-ordinator, Stepping Stones Play and Learn. For services to Early Years and Special Needs Education.
- Marion Anne Meakin. Senior Probation Officer, North West Probation Service, HM Prison and Probation Service. For services to Reducing Reoffending and Public Protection.
- Christiana Melam, Chief Executive, National Association of Link Workers. For services to Social Prescribing.
- Mohammed Gulam Moula Miah. Chairman, Rajnagar Business Group and Moula Foundation. For services to the Bangladeshi Community and to Charity.
- Elinor Muriel Middlemiss. Chef de Mission, Scotland Commonwealth Games Team. For services to Sport.
- Christopher Neill Middleton. Operational Delivery Deputy Director, Home Office. For Public and Voluntary Service.
- Steven Richard Miller. Director of Culture and Heritage, Head of Norfolk Museums Service, Norfolk County Council. For services to Heritage and Tourism.
- Louisa Jane Mitchell. Chief Executive, West London Zone (WLZ). For services to Children and Young People.
- Stephen Moffitt. Chief Executive Officer, A New Direction. For services to the Arts and Culture.
- Alison Jane Moffitt-Robinson. For services to Sports Management and Development in Northern Ireland.
- Huda Mohamed Yassin. Female Genital Mutilation Specialist Lead Midwife, Whittington Health NHS Trust. For services to Midwifery.
- Kathryn Ann Morley. Lately Chief Executive Officer, OnSide. For services to Young People.
- Fiona Bennett Morrison. Lately Community Fund Manager, Scottish and Southern Electricity Renewables. For services to the community in the Scottish Highlands.
- Doreen Lilian Mortimer. Volunteer Shop Manager, Tenby Lifeboat Station, Royal National Lifeboat Institution. For Voluntary Services.
- Andrew Bernard Moseley. Service Leader, Department for Work and Pensions. For public service in South East Wales.
- Peter Mountford. Lately Executive Chairman, Heropreneurs. For voluntary services to Armed Forces Personnel.
- Denise Murdoch. Senior Operations Manager, Carr Gomm. For services to Older People in Argyll and Bute.
- Alison Margaret Murray. Deputy Director of Adult Social Care, Care Quality Commission. For services to Adult Social Care.
- Dr. Meenakshi Nagpaul (Meena Thakur). General Practitioner, Honeypot Medical Centre and Clinical Director, Harrow East Primary Care Network. For services to the NHS.
- Jacqueline Neilson. Chief Executive Officer, Rain Rescue. For services to Animal Welfare.
- William Lambton Nicholson. Leader, Newbury Working Party Group. For services to Canal Restoration.
- June Edna Nicol-Dundas. Foster Carer, Fostering London. For services to Young People.
- Christopher Mansfeldt Norman. Chief Executive and Founder, GOOD Agency. For services to the Business and Charitable Sectors.
- John Norris. Chair, B&M Longworth (Edgworth) Ltd. For services to Innovation, to Sustainability and to International Trade.
- Lawrence John O'Halleron. Chair, Big Local Gateshead. For services to the community in Gateshead, Tyne and Wear.
- Leona O'Neil. Founder, The Boom Foundation. For services to Charitable Fundraising for People with Sarcoma.
- Harry Clive O'Neill. For charitable services to the community in County Down.
- Lanré Charles Olagoke. Founder, Art-Alive Arts Trust. For services to Charity and to Young People.
- David Edward Olney. Assistant Head Ukraine, Security Policy and Operations, Ministry of Defence. For services to Defence.
- Tori Pamela Anne Olphin. Chief Data Scientist and Head of Research, Thames Valley Police. For services to Technology in the Public Sector.
- Ehinor Otaigbe-Amedu. For services to Women in Greater Manchester.
- Lydia Jean Otter. For services to People with Autism and their Families in Oxfordshire.
- Elizabeth Craig Ovens. Director, McCaskies Butchers. For services to Retail and to the Economy in Scotland.
- Alfred Oluwafemi Oyekoya. Director, Black Asian Minority Ethnic Mental Health Support. For services to Minority Ethnic Communities in Wales.
- Caroline Rebecca Paige. For services to Armed Forces Personnel and Veterans.
- The Reverend Canon Dr. Crispin Alexander Pailing. Member, Merseyside Resilience Forum and Safety Advisory Group. For services to the community in Liverpool, Merseyside.
- Blair Parham. Director of Music and Principal Conductor, Scottish Fiddle Orchestra. For services to Scottish Music.
- Satish Manilal Parmar. Senior Policy Adviser, Department for Work and Pensions. For Public Service.
- Carys Parry. Voluntary Party Manager, Conservative Party. For Political Service.
- Imran Adam Patel. For services to the community in Blackburn, Lancashire.
- Wolodymyr Pawluk. Chair, London Branch, Association of Ukrainians in Great Britain and Member, National Executive Committee, Ukrainian Youth Association. For services to the Ukrainian Community.
- Ewan Benjamin Payne. Team UK Gold Medal Winner, WorldSkills UK. For services to Further Education.
- Catherine Penny. For services to Plant Heritage and to the community in North Preston, Lancashire.
- Professor Yvonne Perrie. Professor of Drug Delivery and Head, Institute for Pharmacy and Biomedical Sciences. For services to Pharmaceutical Innovation and Regulation.
- Timothy Foster Pick. Lately First UK Offshore Wind Champion and Chair, Offshore Wind Acceleration Taskforce. For services to Offshore Wind Energy.
- Ruth Beatrice Pitter. Member, Anchor Society and Member, Stand Against Racism and Inequality. For services to Equality, to Charity and to the community in Bristol.
- Andrew Geoffrey Pollock. Founder, CLEVR Money. For services to Financial Inclusion.
- Phillip George Potter. Regional Lead, West Midlands, Wales and South West, UK Export Finance. For services to Business and to the community in Worcestershire.
- Jeffrey Richard Powell. Sports Writer and Columnist, Daily Mail. For services to Journalism and to Sport.
- Patricia Mary Pritchard. For services to Childcare and Early Years.
- Dr. Heidi Probst. Researcher, Lecturer and lately Director, Health Research Institute, Sheffield Hallam University. For services to Radiography.
- Howard John Provis. For services to the Welsh Blood Transfusion Service and to the community in Barry and the Vale of Glamorgan.
- Brian Thomas James Purcell. Lately Northern District Manager, St John Ambulance. For voluntary service in Northern Ireland.
- Anthony Martin Quinn. Lately Business Development Director, Co-operation Ireland. For services to Community Relations in Northern Ireland.
- Jayshree Rajkotia. Trustee and Vice Chair, Bharatiya Vidhya Bhavan, Institute of Indian Art and Culture. For services to Indian Culture.
- Melinda Elizabeth Raker, DL. Founder and Patron, The YANA Charity. For services to Rural Mental Health and Wellbeing.
- Laura-Jane Rawlings. Chief Executive Officer, Youth Employment UK. For services to Young People.
- Yvonne Frances Rawsthorne. Operational Readiness Senior Officer, HM Revenue and Customs. For Public Service.
- Iain Robert Reeve. Head of Ukraine Rail Response Team, Department for Transport. For services to Rail Aid in Ukraine.
- Carole Patricia Richardson. Lately Chair, Rossie Young People's Trust. For services to Young People.
- Dr. Gordon Cameron Richardson. Treasurer, Walking Alliance. For services to Disability Access.
- Luke Thomas Rigg, JP. Lead Diversity and Community Relations Magistrate for England and Wales. For services to Diversity in the Judiciary.
- Gaynor Jean Ripley. Partnership Manager, Department for Work and Pensions. For Public Service.
- Fiona Roberts, JP. Magistrate, Cornwall Bench, South West Region. For services to the Magistracy and the Administration of Justice.
- Kathryn Rose Roberts. Chief Executive Officer, Association of Mental Health Providers. For services to Mental Health.
- Elaine Linda Robinson. Founder Member, Parents of Oldham InTouch and Oldham Special Educational Needs and Disabilities Support Service. For services to Children with Special Educational Needs and Disabilities.
- Lesley Robinson. Managing Director, First Class Supply and Tutoring Ltd. For services to Education.
- Rebecca Robson. Founder, Women's Community Matters. For services to the Victims of Domestic Abuse.
- Simon Rogan. Chef, L'Enclume. For services to the Food Industry.
- Patricia Mary Rogers. Co-Founder, Every Action Has Consequences. For services to Young People.
- Samuel Ross. Artist, Designer and Creative Director. For services to Fashion.
- Ian Alexander Russell. Chair of Trustees, Molly Rose Foundation. For services to Child Safety Online.
- Martin Henry Charles Russell, DL. For services to the community in the London Borough of Barnet.
- Rosemary Priscilla Irene Russell. Art and Design and Technology Technician, The Ursuline Academy Ilford. For services to Education and to Diversity in STEM.
- Elizabeth Joan Ryan. Lately Volunteer, Luton, South Bedfordshire and Harpenden Samaritans. For services to Suicide Prevention.
- Sadia Sadiq. Manager, Community Care and Wellbeing Services. For services to Minority Ethnic Communities in Wales.
- Lorraine Sanda. Strategic Director of People, Clackmannanshire Council. For services to Children and Families.
- Carolene Euleata Sargeant (Carolene Hinds). Independent Performing Arts Professional. For services to Dance.
- Professor William Peter Saunders. Chief Creative Officer, StoryFutures at Royal Holloway University. For services to the Creative Industries.
- Alison Melanie Savage. Officer Commanding, The Services Cotswold Centre. For services to Military Families.
- Jacqueline Savage. Volunteer. For services to Social Care.
- Majida Aly Sayam. Founder and Director, Jannaty Women's Social Society. For charitable services to Ethnic Minority Women.
- Kimberley Louise Scott. Lately Assistant Director of Education, Education Authority. For services to Education.
- Jacqueline Scrivens (Jacqueline Forester). Proprietor, The Woodshed Forest School Nursery. For services to Early Years Child-Lead Learning.
- Josephine Patricia Segal. Co-Founder, Spread a Smile. For services to Seriously and Terminally Ill Children and their Families.
- Kevin Shakesheff. Co-Founder, High Tide Foundation and President, Institute of Chartered Shipbrokers and Educational Fund. For services to Young People in Business and to the Maritime Industry.
- Ian James Donald Sharp. Lately Captain, 6th Wolverhampton Boys' Brigade. For services to Young People in Wolverhampton.
- Yassamin Sheel. National Lead, United Teaching, Greater Manchester. For services to Children.
- Karen Eileen Shepperson. Director of People and Operations, Ofsted. For services to Education.
- Savraj Singh Shetra. Field Intelligence Officer, Home Office. For Public Service.
- Dr. Hamsaraj Gundal Mahabala Shetty. Consultant Physician, University Hospital of Wales. For services to Stroke Services in Wales.
- David Alan Short, JP. Lately Group Technology Director, BAE Systems. For services to Military Capability.
- David Norman Short. For services to Pastoral Care and to the community in Buckinghamshire.
- John Stanley William Simpson. For services to Agriculture and to the community in Lewes, East Sussex.
- Margaret Ann Simpson. For services to the community in Oxfordshire.
- Roselind Pamela Sinclair. Lecturer in Design Education, Goldsmiths, University of London. For services to the Arts.
- Nirmal Singh. Chaplain, North West Prisons HM Prison and Probation Service. For services to Community Development and Interfaith Integration.
- Catherine Elizabeth Skidmore. Head of Aviation Resilience, Department for Transport. For services to Major Event Responses.
- Christopher Jon Smith. Teacher of Mathematics, Grange Academy, Kilmarnock. For services to Mathematics Education and to the community in East Ayrshire.
- Professor Matthew David Snape. Lately Professor in Paediatrics and Vaccinology, Oxford Vaccine Group, University of Oxford. For services to Public Health, particularly during Covid-19.
- Ellen Somme. Founder, Teddy Trust. For services to Vulnerable Children.
- Keith Wyn Sorrell. Lately Chief Executive Officer, Windsor Academy Trust. For services to Education.
- Stephen Terence Sorrell. Director, Small Things Creative Projects Community Interest Company. For services to Arts and Culture in Greater Manchester.
- Julie Spencer. Head of Student Wellbeing Service, University of Lincoln. For services to Education.
- Karen Eleanor Spiers. Senior Charge Nurse, NHS Lanarkshire. For services to Dementia Care in Hospital.
- Robert Jeffrey Stelling. Lately Broadcaster, Sky Sports. For services to Sport, to Broadcasting and to Charity.
- Richard Alexander Stewart. Lately Trustee and Chair of Trustees, St. John's School and College. For services to Children and Young People with Special Educational Needs and Disabilities.
- Amanda St John Davey. National Chair, Women in Property. For services to Working Women.
- Dr. Andrew Stott. Lately Science Adviser, Department for Environment, Food and Rural Affairs. For services to Nature and Climate.
- Professor Peter Alister Stott. Deputy Head of Climate Science and Science Fellow, Met Office. For services to Climate Science.
- The Reverend Professor Elizabeth Bridget Stuart. Lately Deputy Vice-Chancellor, University of Winchester. For services to Higher Education.
- Carol Stump. Lately, President, Libraries Connected. For services to Public Libraries.
- Jacqueline Penelope Suttie. Founder and Chief Executive Officer, PTSD UK. For services to People with Post Traumatic Stress Disorder.
- Christopher Bennet Symonds. Senior Doorkeeper, House of Commons. For services to Parliament.
- Bolanle Tajudeen. Founder and Director, Bolanle Contemporary and Founder and Director, Black Blossoms. For services to the Arts.
- Deborah Janine Tann. Chief Executive, Hampshire and Isle of Wight Wildlife Trust. For services to Wildlife and the Natural Environment.
- Dr. Muhammad Saleem Khan Tareen. Psychiatrist, Northern Health and Social Care Trust. For services to Mental Ill Health and to Community Development in Northern Ireland.
- Jenny Thompson. Co-Founder and Director, Market Operations. For services to the Business and Food Sectors.
- Laurence Joseph Thraves. Head, National Situation Centre, Cabinet Office. For Public Service.
- Troy Donoghue Townsend. Head of Player Engagement, Kick It Out. For services to Diversity and Inclusion in Association Football.
- Deborah Ann Turnbull. Founder and Director, River and Sea Sense. For services to Water Safety Education for Young People and Families.
- Steven Underwood. Lately Mathematics Teacher, Ryedale School, Beadlam, North Yorkshire. For services to Education.
- Robin Arden Varley. Chair, Cricket Wales North Area Board, Cricket Wales Ltd. For services to Cricket in Wales.
- Sarah Vaughan. Deputy Head Teacher, Perryfields Primary Pupil Referral Unit, Worcester. For services to Education.
- Maureen Vevers. Chair of Governors, Askham Bryan College, York. For services to Further Education.
- Alexandra Ellen Vincent. Lately Chief Operating Officer, Arts and Humanities Research Council. For services to Research Funding.
- Suman Vohra. Vice Chair, Edinburgh Hindu Mandir and Cultural Centre. For services to the community in Edinburgh.
- Belinda Alison Voos. Lately Nurse Consultant in Paediatric Neurosurgery, Great Ormond Street Hospital for Children NHS Foundation Trust. For services to Paediatric Neurosurgical Nursing.
- Dorothy Helen Wagstaff. Founder, CASCAID. For services to Charity.
- David Walker. Chair of Trustees, Horizons Specialist Academy Trust. For services to Education.
- Susan Walker. Chief Commissioner, Girlguiding Scotland. For services to Young People.
- David Wallace. Senior Fleet Staff Engineer, Royal National Lifeboat Institution. For voluntary service to Maritime Safety.
- Lady (Julia Elizabeth) Walport (Dr. Julia Neild). Lately Trustee, The Amber Trust and Trustee, Ealing Youth Orchestra. For services to Young People and to Charity.
- Keith Norman Walton. Founder, Severnside Community Rail Partnership. For services to Urban Rail Transport in Bristol.
- John Ward. Chair, Charles and Elsie Sykes Trust. For services to Charity and to the community in Harrogate, North Yorkshire.
- Pamela Joan Ward. For services to the community in Whipsnade, Bedfordshire.
- William John Ward. For services to the community in the New Forest, Hampshire.
- Edward Charles Warner. Disability and Access Ambassador, Cabinet Office Disability Unit. For services to Disabled People.
- Graham Thomas Waters. Founder and Managing Director, Airbond. For services to Innovation.
- Selina Marie Webb. Executive Vice President, Universal Music UK. For services to the Music Industry, to Neurodiversity and to Charity.
- Maurice Scott Weightman. Founding Chair and Trustee, Berwick Youth Project. For services to Young People in Berwick-Upon-Tweed.
- Arabella Helen Weir. Artistic Director, Kirkcaldy Festival of Ideas and Trustee, Theirworld Children's Charity. For services to the Arts and to Young People.
- James Michael Whale. Broadcaster. For services to Broadcasting and to Charity.
- Anne Patricia White. Volunteer Director, Thurrock Lifestyle Solutions Community Interest Company. For services to People with Impairments.
- Jonathan Richard White. Economist, Department of Health and Social Care. For services to Social Care Policy.
- Claire Amanda Whiting. Founder, Two2One. For services to Bereaved People in Southend-on-Sea, Essex.
- Carly Ann Whyborn. Director, Refugees at Home. For services to Refugees.
- Carla Maria Williams (Carla Marie Williams). Chief Executive Officer and Founder, Girls I Rate and Songwriter. For services to Music.
- Dr. Elizabeth Catherine Williams (Kay Williams). Head of International Chemicals, Pesticide and Hazardous Waste, Department for Environment, Food and Rural Affairs. For services to the International Environment and charitable service through Bees Abroad.
- Gareth David Williams. Detective Superintendent, British Transport Police. For services to Policing.
- Joanne Kate Williams (Kate Woolveridge). Chief Executive Officer, Forget-me-not Chorus. For services to People with Dementia and their Families.
- Dr. Emma Lucy Wilson. Director of Technical, Production and Costume, Royal Opera House. For services to the Performing Arts.
- William Wilson. Senior Officer, National Crime Agency. For services to Law Enforcement.
- Belinda Ann Winstone. Team Leader, Army Bereavement and Aftercare Services. For services to Military Families.
- Joan Harris Winterkorn. Archive and Manuscript Consultant and Member, Acceptance in Lieu Panel, Arts Council England. For services to Heritage and Culture.
- Theresa Wise. Chief Executive, Royal Television Society. For services to Broadcasting.
- Nicola Clare Wood. Senior Independent Director, Information Commissioner's Office. For services to Regulation.
- Mary Elizabeth Woods. Lately Nurse Consultant, The Royal Marsden NHS Foundation Trust. For services to Lymphoedema.
- Caroline Valerie Wright. Early Childhood Director, Bright Horizons Nursery. For services to Early Years Education.
- Judith Kathleen Wright. Trustee, Orders of St John Care Trust and lately Chair, St John Priory Group for Buckinghamshire. For voluntary service to the Order of St John.
- Stephen Richard Wright. Broadcaster. For services to Radio.
- Gloria Ingrid Wyse. Head of Research and Content, Business in the Community. For services to Diversity and Inclusion.
- Dr. Richard Kenneth Howard Wyse. Director of Clinical Development, Cure Parkinson's. For services to Medicine in Parkinson's Disease.
- Susan Yates. Officer, National Crime Agency. For services to Law Enforcement.
- Allan Reid Young. Head of Instrumental Music, Perth and Kinross. For services to Music.

International list

- John Adams. Chair, British Retirement Home Association, Portugal. For services to the Community and Voluntary Organisations in Portugal.
- Joy Atkinson. Desk Officer, Foreign, Commonwealth and Development Office. For services to British Foreign Policy.
- Nicola Jane Barrett. Head, Corporate Services, British Embassy Moscow, Russia. For services to British Foreign Policy.
- Liza Barry. Deputy Director, Foreign, Commonwealth and Development Office. For services to National Security.
- Geoffrey James Booker. Founding Chairman and Field Director, The Quicken Trust and The GB Trust. For services to the community in Kabubbu, Uganda.
- Geraldine Elizabeth Booker. Director of Development, The Quicken Trust and The GB Trust. For services to the community in Kabubbu, Uganda.
- Sian Bowsley. Head, Agrifood and Sanitary and Phytosanitary (SPS), Windsor Framework Taskforce, Foreign, Commonwealth and Development Office. For services to British Foreign Policy.
- Christopher Mark Broadbent. Team Leader, Foreign, Commonwealth and Development Office. For services to National Security.
- Keith John Buckley. Chairman, British Chamber of Commerce, Macao; Chairman, The Lighthouse Club (Macao Branch) charity. For services to the Local Community and British Interests in Macao.
- Scott Arthur Burgess. Acting Overseas Security Manager, British Embassy Tehran, Iran. For services to the British Embassy Tehran.
- Adina Diana Esther Munroe-Charlow. Chairperson, Royal British Legion, Bahamas Branch. For services to Veterans in The Bahamas.
- Gillian Clasby. Founder and lately Teacher, Harmanli Refugee Camp Play School, Bulgaria. For services to the Humanitarian Support of Refugee Children in Bulgaria.
- Sadie Clasby-Jarrous. Founder and lately Manager, Harmanli Refugee Camp Play School, Bulgaria. For services to the Humanitarian Support of Refugee Children in Bulgaria.
- Timothy Robert Conibear. Founder, Waves for Change. For services to Young People Overseas.
- John David Crouch. Lately Technical Works Supervisor, British Embassy Mogadishu, Somalia. For services to the UK Government Overseas.
- Sophie Louise Dyer. Lately Counsellor, Trade Policy, British Embassy Tokyo, Japan. For services to Trade.
- Deborah Carol Edgington. Councillor for Tourism, Fuerteventura, Canary Islands, Spain. For services to British Nationals in Fuerteventura.
- Richard John Field. Independent Voluntary and Charity Worker in rural Uganda. For services to Young People and Health in Uganda.
- Kelly Teresa Fisher. Professional Pool, Snooker and English Billiards player. For services to Sport.
- Nigel James Fossey. Principal, The Sultan's School, Oman and formerly Headmaster, King´s College School, Panama. For services to British Education Overseas.
- Lowri Mai Griffiths. Head, Ocean Policy Unit, Legal Directorate, Foreign, Commonwealth and Development Office. For services to Ocean Protection.
- Joanne Margaret Hare. Deputy Director, Foreign, Commonwealth and Development Office. For services to National Security.
- Elizabeth Ann Haydon. Head, Harrow International School, Hong Kong. For services to British Education in the UK and Hong Kong.
- Frank Alexander Menzies-Hearn. Volunteer Piper, Commemorative events in Greece. For services to Commemorations and Veterans in Greece.
- Brenda Patricia Heather-Latu. British Honorary Consul, Apia, Samoa. For services to British Nationals in Samoa.
- Robert Charles Jackson Hicks. Surgical Team Lead, Hernia International Carpenter and Ghana Healthcare Partners, Leyaata Hospital, Ghana; Consultant Surgeon, Northampton General Hospital. For Services to Health in Northern Ghana.
- Gregory John Holland. Chief Executive Officer, British Chamber of Commerce, Santiago, Chile. For services to UK/Chile Bilateral Trade and Investment.
- Daren Hughes. Team Leader, Foreign, Commonwealth and Development Office. For services to British Foreign Policy.
- Dr. Brad James Irwin. Head of Global Engagement, Natural History Museum. For services to UK Culture and the Arts.
- Paula Mary Jack. Justice Adviser, Northern Ireland Co-operation Overseas. For services to Child Justice Reform, to Human Rights and to International Relations in Bahrain.
- Ivor Cosimo Jencks. Lately General Manager, Hongkong Land Group and Head of Commercial Development, Commercial Property, South Asia. For services to Business, to Charity and to Sustainable Development in Vietnam.
- Jennifer Anne Tudor Larby. Executive Officer, British Legion Kenya. For services to the British and Commonwealth ex-services community in Kenya.
- Dr. Matthew Linkie. Regional Technical Director, Wildlife Conservation Society. For services to Biodiversity Conservation in Indonesia.
- Michael Ralph Lubbock. Conservationist, Sylvan Height's Waterfowl Park and EcoCenter, North Carolina, United States of America. For services to Global Wildlife Conservation of Water Birds.
- Dr. Robert Murray Lyman. Author of Military History; Trustee and former Chairman, the Kohima Educational Trust. For services to Military History and to Charitable Work in Nagaland, Northeast India.
- Steven Lawrie Lynch. Lately Managing Director, British Chamber of Commerce, Beijing, China. For services to the British Business Community in China.
- Mary Dionesse Martin. Board Member and Honorary Treasurer, Cheshire Homes, Mbabane, Eswatini. For services to People with Disabilities in Eswatini.
- Sharon Marie Martin. Educator (retired), the Government's Public Education System, Cayman Islands. For services to Education and to the community in the Cayman Islands.
- Justin Owen McPhee. Lately Commanding Officer, Falkland Islands Defence Force. For services to Defence in the Falkland Islands.
- Diane Miles. Co-Founder and Trustee, Afrikaya charity, The Gambia. For services to Education in The Gambia.
- John Charles Mitchell. Head of Roamer Team, Eastern European and Central Asia Directorate, Foreign, Commonwealth and Development Office. For services to British Foreign Policy.
- John Gabriel Monaghan. Station Manager (retired), Devon and Somerset Fire and Rescue Service; Founder and Project Manager, Fire Aid Nepal. For services to Emergency and Disaster Response and to local Communities in Nepal.
- Calypso Mabel Nash. Lately Acting Head of Chancery, British Embassy Tehran, Iran. For services to British Foreign Policy.
- Roseanne Park. Musician/Performer. For services to the United Kingdom COP 26 Presidency and advocacy for the 2021 United Nations Climate Change Conference of the Parties.
- Gina Cecile Petrie. Director, Department of Environment, Cayman Islands. For services to the Environment and to the community in the Cayman Islands.
- Richard Anthony Power. Orthopaedic Surgeon, University Hospitals of Leicester NHS Trust; Chair, Health Action Leicester in Ethiopia. For services to Health in Gondar, Northern Ethiopia.
- Natalie Ray Pray. Former President, the St George's Society, New York, United States of America. For services to UK/US Cultural Relations and to Philanthropy.
- Phillip Christopher Robinson. Team Leader, Foreign, Commonwealth and Development Office. For services to National Security.
- James Andrew Rogers. Head of Coordination, Windsor Framework Taskforce, Foreign, Commonwealth and Development Office. For services to British Foreign Policy.
- Lynette Silver. Historian and Author. For services to British Families of World War II personnel.
- Claire Sonia van Straubenzee. Founder and Trustee, The Henry van Straubenzee Memorial Fund. For services to Children's Education in Uganda.
- Edward Robert Syfret. Angola Programme Manager, the HALO Trust. For services to Humanitarian Demining in Angola.
- Margery Anne Taylor. District Treasurer and District Training Officer, Royal British Legion, Spain South. For services to Veterans in Spain.
- Jacqueline Barbara Teasdale (Tig James). Co-President, British in Portugal. For services to the British Community in Portugal.
- John Robert Thurlow. Head of Change and Labs, Information and Digital Directorate, Foreign, Commonwealth and Development Office. For services to British Foreign Policy.
- Dr. Rosemary Joy Trevelyan. Director, The Tropical Biology Association. For services to Environmental Science and International Conservation.
- Pamela Vipond. Deputy Director, Olympic Solidarity, the International Olympic Committee. For services to Sport.
- Paul Walker. Co-Founder and Co-Director, Wildtracks, Belize. For services to Conservation and Biodiversity in Belize.
- Zoe Elizabeth Walker. Co-Founder and Co-Director, Wildtracks, Belize. For services to Conservation and Biodiversity in Belize.
- David Justin Warmback. Honorary Consul, Durban, South Africa. For services to British Nationals in South Africa.
- Christopher Michael Wicker. President and Trustee, Hertford British Hospital Charity; Secretary General, Save the Valletta Skyline Appeal. For services to Charity and to British Nationals in France and Malta.
- Steven Leonard Williams. Kyaninga Child Development Centre and Kyaninga Forest Foundation, Uganda. For services to Disabled Children and Local Communities in Western Uganda.

=== British Empire Medal (BEM) ===
Ribbon bar of the British Empire Medal

==== Bar ====
- Douglas Philippe Turner, BEM. Community Development Worker, Second Wave Centre for Youth Arts. For services to Young People.

==== Medallists ====
- The Reverend Canon William Matthew Adair. Rector, St Columba's Parish, Portadown. For services to the Church of Ireland and to the community in Portadown, County Armagh.
- Sean Adcock. Master Craftsman. For services to Dry Stone Walling.
- Rasheed Alawiye. Detective Inspector, Metropolitan Police Service. For services to Policing, and to Diversity and Inclusion.
- Christopher Allen. For services to the community in Chesterfield, Derbyshire.
- Dr. Jahangir Alom. Doctor and Campaigner, NHS. For services to Tackling Health Inequalities, particularly during Covid-19.
- Carl Peter Anglim. Lately Chair, Oxfordshire Youth. For services to Young People.
- Margaret Helen Archibald. Founder, Everyone Matters. For services to Music.
- Reverend Margaretha Catharina Maria Armitstead. For services to the community in Littlemore, Oxfordshire.
- Keith Morton Armour. Fundraiser, Children's Hospices Across Scotland. For Charitable Services.
- Olive Arnold. For services to the community in Bronington, Shropshire.
- Robert Arnott. For services to the community in Coventry.
- Waqas Arshad. Chair, Bradley Big Local. For services to Families with Mental Health Issues in Lancashire.
- Saeqa Ashraf. For services to Law Enforcement.
- Reverend Christine Joyce Aspinall. For services to the community in Old Trafford, Greater Manchester.
- Moses Olawole Ayoola. Director, Estates and Facilities, Lewisham and Greenwich NHS Trust and Guy's and St Thomas' NHS Foundation Trust. For services to Leadership in the NHS.
- Enid Bacon. Founder, Beck Row Preschool, Bury St Edmunds. For services to Early Education.
- Richard Stephen Baldock. For services to the community in Over Wallop, Hampshire.
- Frank Keith Ball. Poppy Appeal Collector, Royal British Legion. For voluntary service to Veterans.
- Michael Lawrence Ballinger. For services to the community in Wickford and District, Essex.
- Sean Balmer. Coach, Cockermouth Swimming Club. For services to Swimming in Cumbria.
- Ian John Barnaby. Crew and Navigator, Torbay Lifeboat Station, Royal National Lifeboat Institution. For voluntary services to Maritime Safety.
- Robert Smart Barnes. Pipe Major, Methil and District Pipe Band. For services to Young People and to the community in Levenmouth, Fife.
- Wendy Angharad Barnett. Guide Leader. For services to Girlguiding and to the community in Milford Haven, Pembrokeshire.
- Elaine Phyllis Paterson Barnwell. Fundraiser, Royal Marines Association - The Royal Marines Charity. For Charitable Services.
- Dr. Michael Bartlett. Medical Educator, Hywel Dda Health Board and the Royal National Lifeboat Institution. For services to Medical Education.
- Kirstie Louise Baughan. Social Worker, Central Bedfordshire Council. For services to Social Work.
- Martin James Bazeley. For services to the community in Southwick, Hampshire.
- Valerie Beattie. For services to the community in County Antrim.
- Christine Ann Beech. Guide Leader, 1st Long Lawford Brownies, Warwickshire. For services to Young People.
- Andrew Colin Beevers. For services to Bell Ringing and to the community in Ecclesfield, South Yorkshire.
- Sheila May Betts. Chair and Volunteer, The Jarman Centre, Girlguiding Cambridgeshire East. For services to Young People.
- Valerie Joy Beynon. For services to the community in Cobham, Surrey.
- Elizabeth Kay Billington. Chair, Kushti Bok and Vice-Chair, Dorset Council Gypsy Traveller Forum. For services to the Gypsy and Traveller Community in Dorset.
- William Archibald Bingham. Chair, Newcastle and Mourne Cancer Research Committee. For services to Cancer Research Fundraising in County Down.
- Chandra Shekhar Biyani. Consultant Urological Surgeon, Leeds Teaching Hospitals NHS Trust. For services to Medical Education.
- Reverend Christine Fiona Blackman. For services to the community in Reading, Berkshire.
- Derek John Bland. For services to the community in Northamptonshire.
- Roberta Vivian Lindsay Blyth. For services to the community in Roade, Northamptonshire.
- Winifred Patricia Bownes. Volunteer Coordinator, Cookstown Monday Club. For services to the community in Cookstown, County Tyrone.
- Mary Boyes. Cleaner, North Shore Academy, Stockton-on-Tees. For services to Education.
- John Robert Boyne-Aitken. For services to Heritage Crafts.
- Evelyn Lettita Bracey. For services to the community in Wantage, Oxfordshire.
- Paul Mark Brackley. Community First Responder, Oundle Community First Responders. For services to the community in Oundle and North Northamptonshire.
- Christopher Samuel Bradbury. For services to the community in Reedham, Norfolk.
- Moira Jeanette Brock. Founder and Principal, La Danse Fantastique. For services to Young People in Basildon, Essex.
- Anna Theresa Margaret Brown. For services to the NHS and to the community in the London Borough of Richmond-upon-Thames.
- Dennis Sydney Brown. For services to the community in Runnymede, Surrey.
- Gillian Pamela Brown. Diary Manager to Permanent Secretaries, Department for Transport. For Public Service.
- Dr. John Morrison Brown. For services to the community in County Tyrone.
- Margaret Rose Brown. National Standard Bearer, Royal British Legion Scotland. For voluntary service to Veterans.
- Susan Yvonne Browne. For services to the Women's Institute and to the community in Sandringham, Norfolk.
- Alison Stephanie Buchanan. Founder, The British Horse Society Changing Lives Awards and Trustee, #WillDoes Charity. For services to Young People.
- Robert James Buchanan. Chair, Londonderry Branch, Royal Naval Association. For voluntary services to Veterans.
- Sarah Bull. Head of Bereavement Services, City Hospice. For services to Palliative Care.
- William Michael Bulstrode. For services to the community in Framlingham, Suffolk.
- Valerie Jean Butcher. For services to the community in Kidlington, Oxfordshire.
- Dr. Fiona Ogilvie Butler. Principal in General Practice, Health Partners at Violet Melchett. For services to the community in West London.
- Rowland George Butler. For services to the community in Chard, Somerset.
- Asad Mehmood Butt. Volunteer, Chance to Shine. For services to Young People and to the community in the London Borough of Croydon.
- Norah Button-Brookwell. Founder and Principal, Liverpool Theatre School. For services to Dance and Theatre.
- Reverend Albert Thomas Cadmore. For services to the community in Great Yarmouth, Norfolk.
- Sandra Carol Calderbank. For services to the community in the London Borough of Harrow.
- Sam Camfield. Design Manager, South Western Railway. For services to the State Funeral of Her Majesty Queen Elizabeth II.
- William Wright Glover Campbell. Captain, 1st Stewarton Boys' Brigade. For services to the community in Stewarton, East Ayrshire.
- Bronwin Mary Carter. Paralympic Coach. For services to Sport.
- Christopher Charles Cassidy. Watchkeeper, Cabinet Office. For services to Civil Contingencies and to St John Ambulance.
- Ann Chapman. For services to the community in Radcliffe, Metropolitan Borough of Bury.
- Stephen Charnock. For services to the community in Newark, Nottinghamshire.
- Ian Raymond Clark. For services to the community in High Wycombe, Buckinghamshire.
- Roy Michael Claxton. Founder, Parkinson's Scottish Table Tennis Association. For services to People with Parkinson's Disease.
- Peter Stewart Clemson. Founder and Chair, Little Theatre Company. For services to the Performing Arts and to the community in Burton-on-Trent, Staffordshire.
- Judith Mary Climer. Founder, Michael Climer Legacy Fund. For services to the community in Caerphilly.
- Isobel Jennifer Clink. For services to Golf.
- Joy Henrietta Mary Coalter. Lately Building and Cleaning Supervisor, Brookeborough Primary School, County Fermanagh. For services to Education.
- Robert Coburn. Scottish Area Vice Chair, Royal Naval Association and Poppy Appeal Convenor. For voluntary service to Veterans and to the community in Inverness-shire (to be dated 27th November 2023).
- Dr Shara Cohen. Chief Executive Officer, Honnao Ltd. For voluntary services to Women in STEM and to Cancer Patients and their Families.
- Tina Ruth Coldham. Participation, Involvement and Engagement Advisor, NIHR. For services to Inclusive Patient and Public Involvement in Research.
- ShelleyJane Coleman. For services to the community in Plymouth, Devon.
- Robert John Collins. Founder, Pass It On Young Sports Voluntary Youth Organisation. For services to Young People and to Sport.
- Geraldine Constable. For services to the community in Hailsham and Eastbourne, East Sussex.
- Rev. Canon Diane Veronica Cookson. For services to St. Saviour's Parish Church and to the community in Stockport, Greater Manchester.
- Reginald John Cording. For services to the community in Barley, Hertfordshire.
- Jon-Paul Kitson Cornforth. For services to the community in Rotherham, South Yorkshire, particularly during Covid-19.
- Margaret Cortis. For voluntary and charitable services to the community in Truro, Cornwall.
- Robert David Cotterill. For services to Business and to the community in Derbyshire.
- Chico Cheikh Sadibou Coulibaly. Regional Manager Waterloo, South Western Railway. For services to the State Funeral of Her Majesty Queen Elizabeth II.
- Noel Desmond Cronin. Founder, Talking Pictures TV. For services to Television Broadcasting.
- Jill Elaine Crook. Director, Nursing, Professional and System Development, NHS England (South West). For services to Transforming Care, Learning Disability and Autism.
- David Cupples. For services to the community in County Tyrone.
- John Andrew Daley. For services to Young People and to the community in Sheffield, South Yorkshire.
- Anita Davenport-Brooks. Group Human Resources Manager, Lander Automotive. For services to Further Education and Skills
- Michael Davidson. Volunteer and Trustee, Royal Ulster Constabulary George Cross Foundation. For Voluntary Service.
- Janet Ann Davies. Councillor, Denbighshire County Council. For services to Local Government, to the NHS and to the community in Rhuddlan, Denbighshire.
- Jean Carol Davies. Chair and Coach, Saints Netball Club, Truro. For services to Netball and to the community in Cornwall.
- Dr Robert Havard Davies. Doctor, Neuro-Development Team, Betsi Cadwaladr University Health Board. For services to the NHS.
- Francisco Domingo Davila Davila. For services to the community in Wymondham, Norfolk.
- Brendan William Davis. Head of Operations, Government Car Service. For services to Government and Major Events.
- Rachel Frances Davis. For services to the community in Cranford, Northamptonshire.
- Audrey Dempsey. Founder, Glasgow's No1 Baby and Family Support Service. For services to Families and Vulnerable People in Glasgow.
- Janet Mary Dicks. For services to the community in Hadleigh, Suffolk.
- Ann Doreen May Doody. For services to the community in Ilfracombe, Devon.
- Trevor Samuel John Douglas. General Manager, Belfast Cathedral. For services to Peacebuilding and to the community in Northern Ireland.
- Lee William Doyle. Chief Executive Officer, Brentford FC Community Sports Trust. For services to Sport and to the community in Brentford, London Borough of Hounslow.
- Janet Shirley Dyer. Catering Manager, National Fire Service College. For services to the community in Moreton-in-Marsh, Gloucestershire.
- Patricia Carol Earl. For services to the community in Radley, Oxfordshire.
- Robert Frank Earl. For services to the community in Radley, Oxfordshire.
- Christopher Harry Wrenn Eaton. For services to the community in Wakes Colne, Essex.
- Euros Hefin Edwards. Watch Manager, Mid and West Wales Fire and Rescue Service. For services to Fire and Rescue.
- Greta Edwards. Cleaner and Kitchen Assistant, North Shore Academy, Stockton-on-Tees. For services to Education.
- Llinos Edwards. Lately Nurse Team Leader, The Looked After Children Team, Betsi Cadwaladr University Health Board. For services to Vulnerable Children in North Wales.
- Stephen David Elsden. Chief Executive, Compaid Trust. For services to Charity and to People with Disabilities.
- Robert Felix Erith TD DL. For services to the Environment in Dedham Vale, Essex and Suffolk.
- Sandra Mary Esqulant. For services to the community in Spitalfields, London Borough of Tower Hamlets.
- Annabel Whyte Evans. For services to the community in Chesham, Buckinghamshire.
- Lyndsey Claire Evans. For services to the community in South Wye, Herefordshire.
- Marian Louise Evans. For services to Business.
- Edward Everett. Member, Friends of Bridgwater Canal. For services to the Environment in Sale, Metropolitan Borough of Trafford.
- John Fielding. Scout Leader, 2nd Rishton Baptist Scout Group, Lancashire. For services to Young People and to the community in Lancashire.
- Mabel Elsie Finnigan. County Captain, Shropshire Ladies Bowls Team. For services to Bowls.
- Mary Margaret Rose Fisher. Lately Lollipop Crossing Patrol, Darley and Summerbridge Community Primary School, Harrogate. For services to Child Road Safety.
- Kenneth Fitzpatrick. Lifeboat Operations Manager, Porthdinllaen Lifeboat Station, Royal National Lifeboat Institution. For services to Maritime Safety.
- Barry Flack. For services to the Jewish Community in the London Borough of Barnet.
- Margaret Elizabeth Flanagan. Member, Inner Wheel Club of Ballymena. For voluntary services to the community in Ballymena, County Antrim.
- John Campbell Forrester. President and Poppy Appeal Organiser, Driffield Branch, Royal British Legion. For voluntary service to Veterans in East Yorkshire.
- Claire Forsythe. Duke of Edinburgh's Award Officer, Probation Board for Northern Ireland. For services to the Rehabilitation of Offenders.
- Susan Joan Foster. For voluntary service in Hampshire.
- Richard Charles Fowler. Library Lead, Harbury Community Library, Warwickshire. For services to Libraries.
- Dr Jennifer Ann Frow. Volunteer, Bewdley Tennis Club. For services to Lawn Tennis in Worcestershire.
- Robert Francis Fyfe. Chair and Director, Runway Theatre Company. For services to the Arts and to the community in Glasgow.
- Melanie Jane Gardner. Fine and Decorative Arts Curator, Tullie House Museum, Carlisle. For services to Arts and Culture in Cumbria.
- Joseph William Garvey. For services to the community in County Armagh.
- Peter William Garwood. For services to the community in Barrow-in-Furness, Cumbria.
- Christine Frances Gatfield. Founder, Dove Cottage Day Hospice. For services to the Terminally Ill.
- Patricia Mary Gaywood. Membership Secretary, The Forty Club. For voluntary service to Cricket.
- Andrew Gell. For services to the community in Riseley, Bedfordshire.
- Christine Mary Gendall. For services to the community in Penzance, Cornwall.
- Terence Brian Gerry. For services to the community in Plymouth, Devon.
- Beth Laura Gevell. Co-Founder and Director, Arts for Life Project (UK). For services to Young People and to Charity.
- Amanda Elizabeth Giddins. Chair, Giddo's Gift. For voluntary and charitable services to Young People with Cancer.
- Kenneth Matthew Gillespie. For services to Young People through Scouting.
- James Bruce Gillett. For services to the community in Charvil and Reading, Berkshire.
- Janet Elizabeth Gloin. Manager and Coach, Women's Football, Orpington Football Club. For services to Association Football and to the community in the London Borough of Bromley.
- Geoffery Frederick Bewick Goldsbrough. Founder, Perennials Charity Rugby Club. For services to Charity in Northern Ireland.
- Sarah Louise Goodall. Watch Manager, West Yorkshire Fire and Rescue Service. For services to Fire and Rescue.
- Susan Joy Graham. Chair, Age UK Milton Keynes. For services to Older People in Milton Keynes and Buckinghamshire.
- Marc Anthony Grayston. Chief Instructor, Maru Karate Kai. For services to Disadvantaged Young People and to the community in Basildon, Essex.
- Beverley Michelle Greenwood. For services to the community in Glenfield, Leicestershire during Covid-19.
- Rachael Greenwood. For services to the community in Bramdean and Hinton Ampner, Hampshire.
- Richard Gregory. For services to the community in Basildon, Essex.
- Harbaksh Singh Grewal. Vice Chair, UK Punjab Heritage Association. For services to Punjabi and Sikh Heritage, and to Charity.
- Wayne Ellis Griffiths. Chair, Macmillan's Wales Volunteer Forum and Ambassador and Fundraiser, Velindre Cancer Centre. For services to Fundraising for Cancer Care and Cancer Research.
- Clare Eluned Frances Gummett. For services to the community in the London Borough of Merton.
- Eileen Hagan. Volunteer, Blackpool Support Adult Services Unit, Scouts Movement. For services to Young People and to the community in Blackpool.
- Ian Robert Hague. For services to the community in Sheffield, South Yorkshire.
- Graham Nelson Hall. Vice President, Nottinghamshire Football Association Ltd. For services to Young People and Sport.
- Godfrey Williams Harrison. For services to the community in Bude-Stratton, Cornwall.
- Martin Dymock Harrison. For services to the community in Royal Leamington Spa, Warwickshire and the West Midlands.
- Stephen Michael Harrison. For services to the Church and to the community in South Petherton, Somerset.
- Shendl Hastings Harvey (Shendl Russell). Teacher and Dancer, Royal Scottish Official Board of Highland Dancing. For services to Dance.
- David Kingsley Hastings. Branch Secretary, Royal National Lifeboat Institution Durham Fundraising Branch and Community Presenter. For voluntary services to the Royal National Lifeboat Institution.
- Nicola June Hawkins. For services to the community in Hastings and Rother, East Sussex.
- Tracy Hawkins. Assistant Secretary, Special Air Service Regimental Association. For Charitable Services.
- John Bertram Heasman. President, Dulwich Unit. For voluntary service to St John Ambulance in London.
- Bronagh Mary Hegarty. Covid-19 Principal Pharmacist for Patient Services and Procurement, Western Health and Social Care Trust. For services to Healthcare and Pharmacy.
- Ian Bruce Henderson. Councillor, Kensington and Chelsea London Borough Council. For services to the community in the Royal Borough of Kensington and Chelsea.
- Jacqueline Ann Hendra. Social Care Assessor, Devon County Council. For services to People with Disabilities.
- Robert Patrick Hendry. Custodian, Prime Minister's Office. For services to the Prime Minister's Office.
- Daniel Herman. For services to Education and to Holocaust Awareness.
- Timothy John Hewer. For services to Beekeeping in Little Stoke, South Gloucestershire.
- Pauline Higgins. For services to the community in Liverpool, Merseyside.
- Donald Alexander Hill. For services to the community in County Londonderry.
- Felicity Ann De Grave Hills. For services to the community in Hastings, East Sussex.
- Andrew Richard Hinchliff. Lately Member, Conwy County Council. For services to Local Government and to the community in North Wales.
- Duncan Holden. Cricket Co-ordinator and Safeguarding Officer, Stoke Newington Cricket Club. For services to Sport in London.
- Ian Watson Holland. Lately Chair and Trustee, Enable Ayr and District SCIO. For services to People with Learning Disabilities in Ayr and Prestwick.
- Beverly Joan Hopkins. Special Educational Needs Co-ordinator, Palmerston Primary School, Barry. For services to Education, to People with Disabilities and to Sport.
- The Reverend Christopher Stewart Howson. Chaplain, University of Sunderland. For services to Higher Education.
- Dr Catherine Marian Hubbert. Macmillan General Practitioner and Founder, Woodlands Hospice Charitable Trust. For services to Palliative Care.
- Antony Jasper Hudgell. Co-Founder, Tony Hudgell Foundation. For services to the Prevention of Child Abuse.
- Karen Humphries. Assessor and Duke of Edinburgh Award Manager, Nunnery Wood High School, Worcester. For services to Young People.
- Graham Walter Hundley. Emergency Response Volunteer, Cumbria. For voluntary service to the British Red Cross.
- Elaine Hutchings. For services to the community in Lichfield, Staffordshire during Covid-19.
- Lena Moira Hutchinson. For voluntary services to the community in Larne, County Antrim.
- William David Hutton. Founder, Campsie Accordion and Fiddle Club. For services to Music and to the community in Dunbartonshire.
- Robert Alan John Illman. For services to Mountain Rescue in Dartmoor, Devon.
- Richard Stansfield Isaac. Community and Sustainability Manager, Northern Trains. For services to Inclusion in the Rail Industry.
- Clive Herbert Jackson. For services to the community in York.
- Christopher Angus Jamieson. Special Inspector, British Transport Police (Scotland). For services to Policing.
- Patricia Carol Jarman. For services to the community in Stalybridge, Metropolitan Borough of Tameside.
- Michael George Jaynes. Akela, 1st Hatherley Scouts, Cheltenham. For services to Young People and to the community in Cheltenham, Gloucestershire.
- Hilary Mary Jenkins. For services to the community in Wiltshire, particularly during Covid-19.
- Vivien Jess. Learning Centre Manager, Education Training Service. For services to Defence and to the community in Northern Ireland.
- Dr Terry Martin John. Lately General Practitioner, The Firs Medical Centre, London Borough of Waltham Forest and lately Chair of International Committee, British Medical Association. For services to Medicine.
- Frances Barbara Johnson. Learning Support Assistant, Dame Tipping Church of England Primary School, Romford, London Borough of Havering. For services to Education.
- Louis Connor Johnson. For services to the community in Wolverhampton, West Midlands.
- Hilary Johnston. Founder, Cwtch Baby Bank. For services to Mothers and Babies in South East Wales.
- Monica Ann Johnston. Admission/Discharge Co-ordinator, Neurosciences, Belfast Health and Social Care. For services to Nursing and to the community in Northern Ireland.
- Anne Jones. For services to the community in Neston, Cheshire.
- Patricia Ellen Jones. For services to the community in Nailsworth, Gloucestershire.
- Sundeep Kaur. Director, United Sikhs. For services to the community in the West Midlands during Covid-19.
- Lisa Michelle Kay. For charitable services to Ukrainian Refugees and to the community in Solihull, West Midlands.
- Coral June Kelham. For services to the community in Barrow upon Soar, Leicestershire.
- Anne Marie Kelly. Lately Regional Office Manager, Northern Ireland Organ Donor Service. For services to Organ Donation and Transplantation in Northern Ireland.
- Richard Kennell. Chief Executive Officer, SOFEA. For services to Social Inclusion and to Alleviating Food Poverty.
- Dr Christopher John Kent. Organist. For services to Music and Musicology.
- Azam Ahmed Khan. Executive Officer, Department for Work and Pensions and Founder, The Akhirah Team. For Charitable Services.
- William James David King. For services to Association Football in Northern Ireland.
- Gwendoline May Kingdon. For services to the community in South Molton, Devon.
- Elizabeth McDonald Kinnear. Volunteer, Guide Dogs Perth and District Branch. For services to Guide Dogs for the Blind in Perthshire.
- Juan Kotze. OCS Contracted Security Lead and Head of VIP Relations, Ministry of Justice. For Public Service.
- Kathleen Louisa Kynaston. Lately Chair, Shrewsbury Amateur Swimming Club. For services to Swimming and to the community in Shropshire.
- Rachael Isabel Lake. For services to the community in Walton on Thames, Surrey.
- Marino Teddy Michel Latour. Designated Safeguarding Professional, NHS South West London Integrated Care Board. For services to Safeguarding Adults.
- Amanda Jayne Lear. Enforcement Case Manager, Department for Work and Pensions. For services to the community in Moreton, Merseyside.
- Diana Rosemary Lee. For services to the community in Collingham, West Yorkshire.
- Frances Christina Lee. For services to the community in Acocks Green, West Midlands.
- Stephen Roger Lees JP. For services to the communities in Himley, Swindon and South Staffordshire.
- Morag Linda Lightning. Vice Chair, Turriff and District Community Council. For services to the community in Turriff, Aberdeenshire, particularly during Covid-19.
- Henry Lillystone. Fixtures Secretary, Leicestershire Foxes Sunday League. For services to Youth Football.
- Jane Loveys. Director, Campus Services, University of Bath. For services to Higher Education.
- Geoffrey Lowe. Crew Manager, Norfolk Fire and Rescue Service. For services to the community in Norfolk.
- Joan Lynas. For services to the Girls' Brigade and to the community in Newtownabbey, Northern Ireland.
- Kevin Philip Macey. Head of Major Crime Review, Essex Police. For services to Policing.
- John Alexander Mackintosh. Fundraiser, Cancer Research UK. For voluntary services to Cancer Patients and to the community in Elgin.
- Veronica Maclean. Patron, Moray Fundraising Group, Marie Curie. For voluntary services to Cancer Patients in Moray.
- Mubarak Hussain Mahmed. Well-Being and Engagement Co-ordinator, First Bus North and West Yorkshire. For services to Mental Health.
- Christopher Marsay. Watch Manager, Cleveland Fire and Rescue Service. For services to the community in North Yorkshire.
- Jeremy Paul McCluskey. Front of House and Security Guard, G4S Security. For Public Service, particularly during Covid-19.
- Robert John McCormick. Security Team Leader, Hillsborough Castle and Gardens. For Public Service.
- Jodie McFarlane. Detective Constable, Police Service of Scotland. For services to Children and Families in Ayrshire.
- Patrick Eugene McGeehan. Coach, Santos Football Club. For voluntary service to Association Football in Northern Ireland.
- Myrtle Edna McIlveen. Volunteer Manager, Killyleagh Community Charity Shop. For voluntary services to the community in County Down.
- Matthew McKenzie. Insight Volunteer, Carers UK. For services to Carers.
- Deon Frederick McNeilly. Chair, Newcastle Athletics Club, County Down. For services to Athletics in Northern Ireland.
- Robert Douglas McRae. Poppy Appeal Organiser (West), Poppyscotland. For services to Veterans.
- Harry Charles Lawrence Meade. For services to the community in Goathurst, Somerset.
- Christine Mellor. General Manager, Library Service, North Yorkshire Council. For services to Public Libraries.
- Robin John Mercer. Managing Director, Hillmount Garden Centre. For services to Business and to the Economy in Northern Ireland.
- Melvin James Metcalf. Head of Services, ARCH Sexual Violence Charity. For services to LGBT+ Victim-Survivors of Sexual Violence in the North East.
- Stephen Brian Michael. For services to the community in Kingsand, Cornwall.
- June Miller. For services to the community in Stanton, Suffolk.
- John Minhinick. Lately Chair, Fife Branch, Parkinson's UK. For services to People with Parkinson's Disease in Fife.
- Norman Alexander Mitchell. Chair of Trustees, Lockleaze Sports Centre. For services to Sport in Bristol.
- Brian Desmond Francis Mooney. Member, Common Council, City of London Corporation. For services to the community in the City of London and in Coggeshall, Essex.
- Jane Elizabeth Morris-Eyton. For services to the community in Bootle, Cumbria.
- Adrian David Morrow. Estate Manager, Glenarm Castle and Chief Executive, Irish Grouse Conservation Trust. For voluntary services to Habitat Conservation and to the community in County Antrim.
- Gloria Moss. Sussex President, British Red Cross. For voluntary service to the community in Sussex.
- Ellen Jane Muers. For services to the community in Rugby, Warwickshire.
- Margaret Sandra Myers. For services to the community in Sheffield, South Yorkshire.
- David Mynott. Volunteer, Torfaen Dementia Group. For services to People with Dementia and their Carers.
- Moez Kass Amali Nathu. Chief Executive, Peterborough Asylum and Refugee Community Association. For services to Refugees and Asylum Seekers in Peterborough.
- Robert Thomson Nellies. President, Falkland Cricket Club. For services to Cricket and to the community in Fife.
- Elyn Catherine Neville. For charitable services to Cancer Patients and to Cancer Services in Pembrokeshire.
- Margaret Alice Newell. Lately Office Manager, Privy Council Office. For Public Service, particularly during the Accession Council.
- Matthanee Nilavongse. For services to the community in Todmorden, West Yorkshire.
- William Ellis Nixon. Honorary Secretary, Social Enterprise UK. For services to Young People in the West Midlands.
- Uzoamaka Louisa Nwokolo. Lately Executive Officer, Department for Transport. For services to Young People.
- Diana Violet O'Grady. For services to the community in Arreton, Isle of Wight.
- Samuel Jozef Oldroyd. Chief Executive Officer, JADE Youth and Community. For services to Young People and Families in Rother Valley, South Yorkshire.
- Clive John Owen. Vice Chair, Aberavon Green Stars Rugby Football Club. For charitable services to Young People and to the community in Aberavon, West Glamorgan.
- Diane Oxley. For services to Young People and to the community in Thurcroft, South Yorkshire.
- Tracie Ann Pal. For services to the community in Hockley Heath, West Midlands.
- Josephine Parkin. For services to the community in Wakefield, West Yorkshire.
- Rachel Frances Parkinson. For services to the community in Whitefield, Greater Manchester during Covid-19.
- Bryony Emily Kate Peall. For services to the community in Saxmundham, Suffolk during Covid-19.
- Diana Marian Pearman. For services to the community in Sonning Common, Oxfordshire.
- Michelle Louise Pearse. Quality and Business Support Manager, Nuclear Decommissioning Authority. For services to Education and to the community in West Cumbria.
- Pearl Ann Pearson-Brooke. For services to the community in Martham, Great Yarmouth, Norfolk.
- Doreen May Peck. For services to the community in Ashtead, Surrey.
- Captain (Rtd) Michael Neville Pemberton. Chief Executive Officer, Building Extraordinary Communities. For services to Regeneration and to the community in Cumbria.
- Michael James Penston. For services to the community in Southampton, Hampshire, during Covid-19.
- Betty Philipson. President, City Road Club (Hull). For services to Cycling and to the community in the East Riding of Yorkshire.
- Bryan Phillips. Volunteer, Irish Guards Association. For services to Armed Forces Charities in Northern Ireland.
- Malson Phillips. Chair, South Wales Shire Horse Society. For services to Conservation.
- Sukhdev Singh Phull. Engineer, Department for Transport. For services to Transport Technology and for charitable services through the Ekom Charity Trust.
- Brian Pilgrim. Lately Whitehall Area Workplace Services Manager, Government Property Agency. For Public Service.
- Virginia Dorothy Pitchers. For services to the community in Upton with Fishley, Norfolk.
- Lesley Porter. Principal's Personal Assistant, Oakgrove Integrated College, Derry-Londonderry. For services to Reconciliation in Northern Ireland.
- Elizabeth Shirley Powell. For services to the community in Brooke, Norfolk (to be dated 28th November 2023).
- Joan Prescott. For services to Young People and to the community in Melling, Merseyside.
- Derek Mark Preston. For services to the Northern Ireland Prison Service and to Charity in Northern Ireland.
- Kathleen Mary Prideaux. For services to the community in Allerford, Somerset.
- Herbert Proctor. For services to the community in Audley, Staffordshire.
- Margaret Douglas Rae. Lately President, Renfrewshire Girlguiding. For services to Girlguiding in Scotland.
- Mahbubur Rahman. For services to Charity and to the community in Oldham, Greater Manchester.
- Rehana Khanam Rahman. For services to the Bangladeshi Community.
- Helen Bridget Margaret Rayfield. Chair, Haringey Rhinos Rugby Football Club. For services to Rugby Union Football and to the community in the London Borough of Haringey.
- Alexander Ritchie. Trustee, New Deer Community Association and Founder Member, Buchan Heritage Society. For voluntary services to Cultural Heritage and to the community in North East Scotland.
- Patricia Christine Roberts. Lately Assistant District Commissioner, North Kent Cubs. For services to Young People in Kent.
- Jean Elna Roberts-Jones. For services to the community in Eastleigh and Fareham, Hampshire during Covid-19.
- Paul Rushworth. Founder, Professionals with Alzheimer's. For services to Charity.
- Kenneth Salter. For services to the community in Ellesmere Port, Cheshire.
- Cheryl Anne Sanderson. For services to Cancer Patients in Barnsley, South Yorkshire.
- David Saunders. For services to the community in Middlesbrough, North Yorkshire.
- Annie Groat Scott. For services to the community in Westray, Orkney.
- Pamela Mary Joyce Scull (Pamela Wingfield). Founder Principal, Wingfield School of Ballet and Dance. For services to Dance and to the community in Bristol.
- Sanjay Shambhu. Councillor, South Gloucestershire Council and Chair, BAME Conservatives. For Political Service.
- John Frederick Sharman. For services to the community in Peterborough, Cambridgeshire.
- Janice Sheward. Director, Cancer United. For services to People with Cancer in West Sussex.
- Darren Keith Sims. Founder, Daz's Rock 4 Charity. For Charitable Fundraising for Disabled and Disadvantaged Young People.
- Ian Robert Skinner. For services to the community in Sidmouth and the Sid Valley, Devon.
- Angela Ann Smith. Lately Deputy Manager, Process Controls Team, Defence Business Services. For services to Defence and to Charity.
- Carl Smith. Advanced Paramedic in Critical Care, East of England Ambulance Service NHS Trust, Head, Clinical Development for Emergency and Critical Care, College of Paramedics and Firefighter, Norfolk Fire and Rescue Service. For services to the NHS and to Fire and Rescue.
- Cheryl Barbara Smith. Leader, Girlguiding Cornwall. For services to Young People.
- John Alexander Alister Smyth. For voluntary and charitable services to the community in Limavady, County Londonderry.
- David Gregory Snook. Reading Volunteer, Hampton Primary School, Herne Bay, Kent. For services to Education.
- Versha Sood-Mahindra. Lately Dementia Lead, BUPA. For services to Community Cohesion and to People with Dementia in Cardiff.
- Zoe Donna Sookun. Project Manager, Network Rail. For services to the Railway and to Rail Aid for Ukraine.
- Denise Speight. Chargehand Cleaner, Newcastle City Council. For services to Local Government.
- Charlotte Jessica Stacey. On Call Firefighter, Oxfordshire Fire and Rescue Service. For services to the community in Oxfordshire.
- Margaret Pearl Sterling. Teaching Associate, School of Medicine, Dentistry and Biomedical Sciences, Queen's University Belfast. For services to Higher Education in Northern Ireland.
- Eileen Linda Stewart. Manager, Armagh Business Centre. For services to Entrepreneurship, to Economic Regeneration and to the community in Armagh, Northern Ireland.
- Gloria Ann Stewart. For services to the community in Sheffield, South Yorkshire.
- Sheena Stewart. Lately Warden, Chalmers Court Sheltered Housing Complex, Inverarary. For services to the community in Mid-Argyll.
- Allan Stokoe. For services to the community in Eldon, North Yorkshire.
- Dr Jill Mary Stoner. Chair, Cromarty Care Project. For services to the community in Cromarty, Ross and Cromarty.
- Jan Tallis. Founding Chair, Community Schools Trust. For services to Children and Families in the London Borough of Newham.
- Robert Sherwin Taylor. For services to the community in Shipbourne, Kent.
- Roma Elimaude Taylor. For services to Community Cohesion in Cardiff.
- Dean Mark Terrett. For services to Search and Rescue on the Isle of Wight.
- Sally Carmichael Thomas JP. For services to the community in Merthyr Tydfil.
- Janet Alexandra Thompson. For services to the Scouting Movement in Northern Ireland.
- Kirsty Elizabeth Tilley. Programme Manager, Defence Science and Technology Laboratory, Ministry of Defence. For services to Defence and to Inclusion.
- David Alwyn Town. For services to Bell Ringing in Northallerton and North Yorkshire.
- Richard William Townsend. Lately Community Coach, Milton Keynes Athletics Club. For services to Sport and to the communities in Milton Keynes and South Yorkshire.
- Mary Elisabeth Trigwell-Jones. For services to the community in East Worldham, Hampshire.
- Jill Trout. For services to the community in Dockenfield, Surrey.
- Stephen John Vale. For services to the community in West Stow, Suffolk.
- Marco Antonio Valencia. Operations Assistant, London Borough of Sutton. For services to Local Government.
- Bernard Vause. For services to Music and to the community in Morecambe, Lancashire.
- Debra Ruth Veigas. End of Life Care Admiral Nurse, Wakefield Hospice and Dementia UK. For services to People with Dementia and to End of Life Care in Wakefield, West Yorkshire.
- Dr Ian Gordon Vincent. President, Nottingham Croquet Club. For services to Croquet.
- Alice Kerr Waite. Officer, Girls' Brigade. For services to Young People and to the community in Cambuslang, Lanarkshire.
- Darren Walker. For services to the community in Leeds, West Yorkshire.
- Florence Diane Walker. Founder and Leader, The Country Playgroup. For services to Early Years Education in County Antrim.
- Sara Patricia Jane Walker. Volunteer, Teddington Hockey Club. For services to Hockey and Masters Hockey, and to the community in the London Borough of Richmond upon Thames.
- Mary Lamorna Wallis. For services to the NHS and to the community in Bloomsbury, London Borough of Camden.
- Penelope Jean Walters. For services to the community in Byker, Newcastle upon Tyne, particularly during Covid-19.
- Russell Mark Walters. Director, Cardiff Cymru and Careline Co-ordinator, Care for the Family. For voluntary service in Wales.
- Helen Elizabeth Walton. Policy Adviser, Rochdale Council. For services to Children in Care and Children in Poverty.
- Leslie John Want. For services to the community in Sketty and Swansea.
- Sharon Ann Warboys. For services to the community in Dunstable, Bedfordshire, particularly during Covid-19.
- Vivienne Ward. Lately Office Manager, Conservative Campaign Headquarters Wales and Secretary, Welsh Board of Management, Conservative Party. For Political Service.
- Adam Samuel Watson. Dairy Farmer, Coleraine. For services to Mental Health in the Farming Community in Northern Ireland.
- Hayley Marie Watson. For services to the community in Exmouth, Devon, particularly during Covid-19.
- The Reverend Roy Morgan Watson. For services to the community in Blaina, Blaeneau Gwent.
- William Joseph Watson. Director, Great North Big Band Jazz Festival. For services to Music.
- Timothy Edward Way. For services to the community in Westcott, Surrey.
- Rosemary Dale Webb. For services to the community in Ross-on-Wye, Herefordshire.
- Sylvia Joan West. For services to the community in County Down.
- The Venerable Thomas Roderic West. Minister, Church of Ireland. For services to the community in County Down.
- David Wheeler. Chair, Lisnaskea Rovers Football Club. For services to Association Football in County Fermanagh.
- Martin John White. For services to Music in Northern Ireland.
- Dorothy Margaret Whittington. Volunteer, Oxford University Newcomers. For services to Volunteering and Higher Education.
- Gwendoline Ann Wickham. President, Guild of the Royal Hospital of St Bartholomew. For services to Charity and to the community in London.
- Dr Jane Wilcock. Chair, North West Faculty, Royal College of General Practitioners and lately General Practitioner, Silverdale Medical Practice, Swinton, Greater Manchester. For services to General Practice.
- Martin Peter Wild. For services to the community in Tamworth, Staffordshire.
- Jonathan Peter Willcocks. Musical Director, The Chichester Singers. For services to Music.
- Matthew James Willer. Founder, The Papillon Project. For services to Young People.
- Goodeson Lloyd Williams. For services to the community in the London Borough of Enfield during Covid-19.
- Howard Mansell Williams. For services to the Royal British Legion and to the community in Spondon, Derbyshire.
- Joan Barbara Williams. Diary Manager, Minister of State for Industry and Economic Security, Department for Business and Trade. For Public Service.
- Linda Elaine Williams. Volunteer Support Administrator, Welsh Ambulance Services NHS Trust. For services to the Community First Responder Scheme in North Wales.
- The Reverend Maureen Margaret Wilson. Member, NHS Highland Health and Social Care Chaplaincy Team. For services to Health and Wellbeing.
- Kenneth Winterbottom. For services to the community in Whittlesford, Cambridgeshire.
- Roy Wood. Coach, Aspull Wrestling Club, Wigan, Greater Manchester. For services to Wrestling and Young People.
- Vivienne Wood. For services to the community in the London Borough of Hammersmith and Fulham.
- Paula Bridget Woolven. For services to the community in East Sussex during Covid-19.
- Lorna Evelyn Woor. For services to the community in Cambridge.
- Dr Michael John Worms. For services to the community in Mill Hill, London Borough of Barnet.
- Louise Wright. Executive Assistant, West Midlands Lieutenancy Office. For services to Local Government and to Charity.
- Louise Emily Wright. For services to Business and to the community in Hereford.
- Ronald Wright. Fleet Technical Officer, Northumberland Fire and Rescue Service. For Public Service.
- Walter Clive Wrigley. For services to St Peter's NHS Healthcare Trust.
- Pauline Young (Pauline Holden). Lately Watch Manager, Essex County Fire and Rescue Service. For services to the community in Great Baddow, Essex.
- Sam David Young. For services to the community in Dunfermline.

=== Royal Red Cross ===
Ribbon bar of the Royal Red Cross

==== Associate of the Royal Red Cross (ARRC) ====
- Staff Sergeant Natalie Dawn Davies, Queen Alexandra's Royal Army Nursing Corps, Q1048809.
- Major Adam Gordon Hughes, Queen Alexandra's Royal Army Nursing Corps, 30081582.
- Major Jennifer Elizabeth Jackson, TD, VR, Queen Alexandra's Royal Army Nursing Corps, Army Reserve, 518454.

=== King's Police Medal (KPM) ===
Ribbon bar of the King's Police Medal for Distinguished Service

England and Wales

- Annabel Sarah Jane Berry, lately Superintendent, Hampshire Constabulary.
- Jason Richard Davies, Assistant Chief Constable, South Wales Police.
- Ian John Dawson, lately Assistant Chief Constable, Lancashire Constabulary.
- Andrew James Duignan, lately Detective Constable, Merseyside Police.
- Karen Ross Findlay, Temporary Commander, Metropolitan Police Service.
- Christopher James Flanagan, lately Detective Inspector, South Yorkshire Police.
- Matthew William Gosling, Detective Chief Inspector, Metropolitan Police Service.
- Kam Hare, Inspector, Greater Manchester Police.
- Laura Catherine Elizabeth Hart, Special Chief Inspector, Merseyside Police.
- Natalie Horner, Detective Constable, Durham Constabulary.
- Paul Joseph Martin Keasey, Superintendent, Gloucestershire Constabulary.
- Edward James Ough, lately Superintendent, South Wales Police.
- John Price, Sergeant, West Midlands Police.
- Hayley Jenny Annette Sewart, Detective Chief Superintendent, Metropolitan Police Service.
- Benjamin Daniel Snuggs, Deputy Chief Constable, Thames Valley Police.
- Amanda Jane Stephenson, Detective Inspector, Metropolitan Police Service.
- Matthew Wesley Ward, Deputy Assistant Commissioner, Metropolitan Police Service.
- Owen Robert Weatherill, lately Assistant Chief Constable, Hertfordshire Constabulary and National Police Co-ordination Centre.

Scotland

- Faroque Hussain, Temporary Assistant Chief Constable, Police Service of Scotland.
- Carol McGuire, Chief Superintendent, Police Service of Scotland.
- Stephanie Rose, Police Constable, Police Service of Scotland.

Northern Ireland

- Samuel Paul Henderson, lately Detective Constable, Police Service of Northern Ireland.
- Nicola Marie Marshall, Detective Superintendent, Police Service of Northern Ireland.
- Kieran Quinn, Inspector, Police Service of Northern Ireland.

=== King's Fire Service Medal (KFSM) ===
Ribbon bar of the King's Fire Service Medal for Distinguished Service

England and Wales

- Samuel Benjamin Allison, Station Manager, Dorset and Wiltshire Fire and Rescue Service
- Phillip Garrigan, OBE, Chief Fire Officer, Merseyside Fire and Rescue Service
- Andrew Roe, London Fire Commissioner, London Fire Brigade
- David Jonathan Russel, Chief Fire Officer, Greater Manchester Fire and Rescue Service

Scotland

- David Gibson, Watch Commander, Scottish Fire and Rescue Service.
- Iain Morris, Acting Director, Asset Management, Scottish Fire and Rescue Service.

Northern Ireland

- Thomas Stanley Torbitt, Watch Commander, Northern Ireland Fire and Rescue Service

=== King's Ambulance Service Medal (KAM) ===
Ribbon bar of the King's Ambulance Service Medal

England and Wales

- Vicki Jane Brown, Advanced Clinical Practitioner, Critical Care, South Western Ambulance Service.
- Cathy-Anne Miranda Burchett, Associate Director, Ambulance Operations, London Ambulance Service.
- Gail Wendy Herbert, Assistant Director, Quality Nursing and Patient Experience, Welsh Ambulance Service.
- Louise Victoria Walker, Ambulance Education, Training & Engagement Lead, Isle of Wight NHS Trust.

Scotland

- Alistair MacDonald, Ambulance Care Assistant, Scottish Ambulance Service.

=== King's Volunteer Reserves Medal (KVRM) ===
Ribbon bar of the King's Volunteer Reserves Medal

Navy

- Warrant Officer 2 Michael Rudall, Royal Marines Reserve, P997471U.

Army

- Captain Carl Goymer, VR, General List, Army Reserve, 24847249.
- Major Adrian Thomas Hunt, DL, VR, Corps of Royal Electrical and Mechanical Engineers, Army Reserve, 564398.
- Warrant Officer Class 1 Shane Julian Marriott, VR, Army Air Corps, Army Reserve, 24792341.
- Warrant Officer Class 2 Denis McKee, VR, The Royal Irish Regiment, Army Reserve, 24692102.
- Major Dawn Marie Saunders, VR, Royal Corps of Signals, Army Reserve, W0832759.

Air Force

- Warrant Officer Michael Antony Kennedy, Royal Air Force, C8211779.
- Squadron Leader Jill Pritchard, Royal Air Force, 2646145P.
- Sergeant Joyce Mitchell Soutar, Royal Air Force, E2626789.
- Warrant Officer Stephen David Thompson, Royal Air Force, Q8132254.

=== Overseas Territories Police Medal (OTPM) ===
Ribbon bar of the Overseas Territories Police Medal

- Maria Atalioti, Chief Inspector, Sovereign Base Areas Police, Cyprus. For services to Policing, Diversity and Inclusion in the Sovereign Base Areas.
- Elliott Forbes, Deputy Commissioner, Royal Anguilla Police Force. For services to Policing in Anguilla.

=== Meritorious Service Medal ===
Navy

- Warrant Officer Class 1 D Lennon
- Chief Petty Officer M Rodway

Army

- Warrant Officer Class 1 Matthew James Anderson, Royal Corps of Signals
- Warrant Officer Class 1 Rupert St John Hardington Banfield, DFC, Army Air Corps
- Warrant Officer Class 1 Peter Bernthal, Corps of Royal Electrical and Mechanical Engineers
- Staff Sergeant Troy David Binding Corps of Royal Electrical and Mechanical Engineers
- Warrant Officer Class 2 Aarron David Butterworth, Corps of Royal Engineers
- Warrant Officer Class 1 (now Captain) Adam Daniel Cooksey, Royal Regiment of Artillery
- Warrant Officer Class 1 (now Captain) Leslie Trevor Dinsmore, Corps of Royal Electrical and Mechanical Engineers
- Warrant Officer Class 2 Darren Lee Duckitt, The Royal Yorkshire Regiment
- Warrant Officer Class 2 Kulbahadur Ghale, The Royal Gurkha Rifles
- Warrant Officer Class 1 (now Captain) Marc Kevin Giles, CGC, The Mercian Regiment
- Warrant Officer Class 1 Philip John Greenway, Royal Regiment of Artillery
- Warrant Officer Class 1 Adam Charles Ireland, The Parachute Regiment
- Warrant Officer Class 1 Manojkumar Jugjali, The Royal Gurkha Rifles
- Warrant Officer Class 1 Carley Lorraine Lambert, Royal Regiment of Artillery
- Warrant Officer Class 1 James Lee Lightfoot, Royal Regiment of Artillery
- Warrant Officer Class 1 (now Captain) Daniel Andrew Long, The Rifles
- Warrant Officer Class 1 James Derek Mayoh, Royal Regiment of Artillery
- Warrant Officer Class 1 (now Captain) Stuart Russell McCreadie, Royal Corps of Signals
- Warrant Officer Class 1 Peter Steven Meager, Corps of Royal Electrical and Mechanical Engineers
- Warrant Officer Class 1 (now Captain) Ryan Daniel O'Neill, The Royal Regiment of Scotland
- Warrant Officer Class 1 James Edward Phillips, Corps of Royal Electrical and Mechanical Engineers
- Warrant Officer Class 2 Michael John Potts, Royal Army Medical Corps
- Warrant Officer Class 2 Prakash Rai, Royal Army Medical Corps
- Warrant Officer Class 2 Kyle Reains, Irish Guards
- Warrant Officer Class 1 James Wright Reid, Corps of Royal Electrical and Mechanical Engineers
- Warrant Officer Class 1 James Oliver Richardson, Royal Regiment of Artillery
- Warrant Officer Class 1 Aran Christopher Rushe, Royal Army Medical Corps
- Warrant Officer Class 1 Grant Spencer Sewell-Jones, Royal Corps of Army Music
- Warrant Officer Class 1 Paul Sheenan, Corps of Royal Electrical and Mechanical Engineers
- Warrant Officer Class 1 Melanie Louise Silvester, Adjutant General's Corps (Staff and Personnel Support Branch)
- Warrant Officer Class 1 (now Captain) Garry Andrew Smurthwaite, The Parachute Regiment
- Warrant Officer Class 2 David Robert John Steel, The Royal Scots Dragoon Guards
- Warrant Officer Class 1 John Ian Sweeney, Army Air Corps
- Warrant Officer Class 2 (now Captain) Trevor Albert Tuhey, Royal Army Physical Training Corps
- Warrant Officer Class 1 Russell James Underwood, Corps of Royal Electrical and Mechanical Engineers
- Warrant Officer Class 2 George Ferguson Francis Wong Vesi, Adjutant General's Corps (Staff and Personnel Support Branch)
- Warrant Officer Class 1 (now Captain) Jonathan George Werrett, The Mercian Regiment
- Warrant Officer Class 1 Joseph Thomas Williams, Corps of Royal Electrical and Mechanical Engineers
- Warrant Officer Class 1 Michael James Williams, Royal Corps of Signals
- Warrant Officer Class 1 David Wood, Corps of Royal Electrical and Mechanical Engineers
- Warrant Officer Class 1 Craig Michael Woodall, Royal Army Veterinary Corps
- Warrant Officer Class 2 Robert Steven Young, Welsh Guards

Air Force

- Warrant Officer (now Flight Lieutenant) J. Blinkhorn
- Warrant Officer (now Flight Lieutenant) H. Dimeck
- Warrant Officer (now Flight Lieutenant) F.E. Hunt
- Warrant Officer D.P. Burke
- Warrant Officer W.O.R Clements
- Warrant Officer N.W. Cook
- Master Aircrew A.R. Davey, AFC
- Warrant Officer J.C. Foxall
- Warrant Officer D.G. Jackson
- Warrant Officer K.E. Jones
- Warrant Officer E.L. Kerslake
- Warrant Officer M.E. Larkin
- Warrant Officer D.A. Lawrence
- Warrant Officer R. Laycock
- Warrant Officer B. Moore
- Warrant Officer C.L.S Old
- Master Aircrew S.R. Parsons
- Warrant Officer K.N. Phillips
- Warrant Officer S.G. Rowbotham
- Warrant Officer A. Wilson
- Warrant Officer P.B. Wilson, MBE
- Warrant Officer S.M. Wooles
- Acting Warrant Officer K.S. Edwards
- Acting Warrant Officer A.S. MacDonald
- Flight Sergeant M.J. Moore
- Flight Sergeant J.C. O'Grady
- Flight Sergeant J.A. Simpkins
- Flight Sergeant C.A. Smith
- Flight Sergeant P.S. Ware
- Flight Sergeant L.A. Williams
- Chief Technician D.G. Bristow
- Sergeant E.P. Jones

== Crown Dependencies ==
=== Isle of Man ===
==== The Most Excellent Order of the British Empire ====
===== Member of the Order of the British Empire (MBE) =====
- Dr. John Keith Daniels. For services to Primary Care on the Isle of Man.
- Guy Julian Thompson. For services to the Scouts Association, Isle of Man.

==== British Empire Medal (BEM) ====
- Reginald Derek Kissack. For Charitable, Cultural and Community Work in the Isle of Man.

=== Guernsey ===
==== The Most Excellent Order of the British Empire ====
===== Commander of the Order of the British Empire (CBE) =====
- Raymond John Evison OBE. For services to Horticulture and to Guernsey.

===== Member of the Order of the British Empire (MBE) =====
- Julia Cameron Bowditch. For services to Sport in Guernsey.

=== Jersey ===
==== The Most Excellent Order of the British Empire ====
===== Officer of the Order of the British Empire (OBE) =====
- Kevin Charles Keen. For services to Business and to the Charity Community in Jersey.

===== Member of the Order of the British Empire (MBE) =====
- Robert Michael Churchill Blackie, Chairman, Executive Council, Jersey Eisteddfod. For services to the Community.

==== British Empire Medal (BEM) ====
- Peter Eric Tabb. For services to the Community's Islands Charities and Non-Profitable Organisations.

== Antigua and Barbuda ==
Below are the individuals appointed by Charles III in his right as King of Antigua and Barbuda, on advice of His Majesty's Antigua and Barbuda Ministers.

=== The Most Excellent Order of the British Empire ===
==== Officer of the Order of the British Empire (OBE) ====
Civil

- Maurice Merchant. For services to Antigua and Barbuda.

==== Member of the Order of the British Empire (MBE) ====
Civil

- Rudolph Sylvester Davis. For services to Youth and Community Development in Antigua and Barbuda.

=== King's Police Medal (KPM) ===
- Dale Michael Mercury, Assistant Superintendent of Police, Royal Police Force of Antigua and Barbuda.

== The Bahamas ==
Below are the individuals appointed by Charles III in his right as King of The Bahamas, on advice of His Majesty's Bahamas Ministers.

=== King's Police Medal (KPM) ===
- Bernard Kenneth Bonamy Jr., Assistant Commissioner of Police, Royal Bahamas Police Force.
- Theophilus Andrew Cunningham. Assistant Commissioner of Police, Royal Bahamas Police Force.

== Grenada ==
Below are the individuals appointed by Charles III in his right as King of Grenada, on advice of His Majesty's Grenada Ministers.

=== The Most Excellent Order of the British Empire ===
==== Officer of the Order of the British Empire (OBE) ====
Civil

- Leroy Joseph. For services to Policing (Immigration).
- Lindon Victor. For services to Sports

==== Member of the Order of the British Empire (MBE) ====
Civil

- Christina Batson. For services to Education.
- Neil Ferguson. For services to Culture

=== British Empire Medal (BEM) ===
- Alwyn Enoe. For services to Entrepreneurships.
- The Reverend Dave King, Presiding Bishop, River Sallee Pentecostal Church/Temple of Deliverance, Grenada District. For services to Religious Affairs and Social Work

== Papua New Guinea ==
Below are the individuals appointed by Charles III in his right as King of Papua New Guinea, on advice of His Majesty's Papua New Guinea Ministers.

=== The Most Excellent Order of the British Empire ===
==== Commander of the Order of the British Empire (CBE) ====
Civil

- Danny Chuan Uong Chiu. For services to Business and to the Community.
- Justice Jeffrey Shepherd. For services to the Legal Sector, to Business and to the Community.

==== Officer of the Order of the British Empire (OBE) ====
Civil

- Joseph Martin Chow Sun Yau, MBE. For services to the Business and to the Community.
- Abdul Wahed Mohammed. For services to Education, to Business Development and to the communities in the National Capital District and Central Provinces during Covid-19.
- Chan Wing Onn. For services to Business and to the Community.

== Solomon Islands ==
Below are the individuals appointed by Charles III in his right as King of the Solomon Islands, on advice of His Majesty's Solomon Islands Ministers.

=== The Most Excellent Order of the British Empire ===
==== Officer of the Order of the British Empire (OBE) ====
Civil

- James Remobatu. For services to the Public Service, to Justice and to the Community.

==== Member of the Order of the British Empire (MBE) ====
Civil

- Daniel Ogu Besa's. For services to Agricultural Development and to the Community.
- Christopher Bwekulyi. For services to the Correctional Service and to the Community.
- Anthony Pisupisu. For services to Justice and to the Community
