= List of universities in the United Kingdom =

This is a list of universities in the United Kingdom (alphabetical by substantive name). Below that are lists of university colleges and other recognised bodies (institutions with degree awarding powers), followed by a list of defunct institutions.

Colleges which do not have degree awarding powers, but which offer higher education courses validated by other institutions, are not listed here, but rather at List of colleges in the United Kingdom offering higher education courses.

== Universities alphabetically ==
This list follows the list of recognised bodies on the UK government website. All the institutions on this list are recognised bodies with university status, indicated either by their use of university title in their name on the recognised bodies list or by reference to the Office for Students database for the few universities that do not use the title in their name. Member institutions of the University of London are listed here if they hold university status.

Arms	University	City	Region	Established	University status	Total students (2024/25)	Notes
	University of Aberdeen	Aberdeen	Scotland	1495	1495	13,930	King's College and Marischal College merged in 1860.
	Abertay University	Dundee	Scotland	1888	1994	4,990	Dundee
	Aberystwyth University	Aberystwyth	Wales	1872	2007	8,970	
	Anglia Ruskin University	Cambridge, Chelmsford, Peterborough	East of England	1858	1992	34,370	Campuses in Cambridge, Chelmsford, Peterborough, and London.
None	Arden University	Coventry	West Midlands	1990	2015	32,740	Private, distance learning & blended learning, London, Birmingham, Manchester, Berlin
	University of the Arts London	London	London	1986	2003	22,950	The university is a federation of six arts colleges: Camberwell College of Arts, Central Saint Martins, Chelsea College of Arts, the London College of Communication, the London College of Fashion and the Wimbledon College of Arts
None	Arts University Bournemouth	Bournemouth	South West England	1880	2012	3,740	
None	Arts University Plymouth	Plymouth	South West England	1856	2022	1,610	
	Aston University	Birmingham	West Midlands	1895	1966	19,565	Birmingham
	Bangor University	Bangor	Wales	1884	2007	9,935	
None	Bath Spa University	Bath	South West England	1852	2005	28,970	
	University of Bath	Bath	South West England	1886	1966	20,530	
None	University of Bedfordshire	Bedford, Luton	East of England	1882	2006	9,000	Campuses in Luton and Bedford.
None	BIMM University	Birmingham, Brighton and Hove, Bristol, Corringham, Leeds, London, Manchester	Multi-region (England)	2001	2022	6,435	Private university with campuses at Brighton, London, Bristol, Manchester, Birmingham, Essex, Dublin, Berlin
	Birkbeck, University of London	London	London	1823	2023	7,720	Member institution of the University of London. University in its own right since 2023.
	University of Birmingham	Birmingham	West Midlands	1825	1900	40,025	
	Birmingham City University	Birmingham	West Midlands	1843	1992	31,875	
	Birmingham Newman University	Birmingham	West Midlands	1973	2012	5,500	
	Bournemouth University	Bournemouth	South West England	1900s	1992	16,860	
None	BPP University	Abingdon, Birmingham, Bristol, Cambridge, Leeds, Liverpool, London, Manchester	Multi-region (England)	1992	2013	31,490	Private, 6 London centres, 12 across rest of England, and 2 in Channel Islands.
	University of Bradford	Bradford	Yorkshire and the Humber	1832	1966	10,770	
None	University of Brighton	Brighton and Hove	South East England	1858	1992	17,405	
	University of Bristol	Bristol	South West England	1876	1909	32,435	
	Brunel University of London	London	London	1798	1966	12,705	Campus at Uxbridge, London. Member institution of the University of London.
	University of Buckingham	Buckingham	South East England	1973	1983	3,455	First private university in the UK
	Buckinghamshire New University	High Wycombe	South East England	1891	2007	18,490	High Wycombe
	University of Cambridge	Cambridge	East of England	1209	1209–1226	22,565	Collegiate university. Established by migration from Oxford in 1209; organised under a chancellor by 1226
	Canterbury Christ Church University	Canterbury	South East England	1962	2005	38,385	
	Cardiff Metropolitan University	Cardiff	Wales	1865	2011	12,265	Formerly University of Wales Institute Cardiff
	Cardiff University	Cardiff	Wales	1893	2005	31,505	
	University of Chester	Chester	North West England	1839	2005	13,520	Campuses at Chester and Warrington
	University of Chichester	Chichester	South East England	1977	2005	6,375	
	City St George's, University of London	London	London	1834	2024	27,230	Member institution of the University of London. Formed in 2024 by merger of City, University of London and St George's, University of London.
	Coventry University	Coventry	West Midlands	1970	1992	29,505	Includes CU Coventry, CU Scarborough and CU London
	Cranfield University	Cranfield	East of England	1946	1993	5,000	
	University for the Creative Arts	Canterbury, Epsom, Farnham	South East England	1856	2008	15,110	Canterbury, Epsom, Farnham, Maidstone and Rochester
	University of Cumbria	Carlisle	North West England	1890	2007	9,065	Main campus at Carlisle, with campuses at London, Lancaster, Penrith and Ambleside
	De Montfort University	Leicester	East Midlands	1870	1992	23,155	Leicester
	University of Derby	Derby	East Midlands	1851	1992	18,895	
	University of Dundee	Dundee	Scotland	1881	1967	13,435	
	Durham University	Durham	North East England	1832	1832	21,150	Collegiate university
	University of East Anglia	Norwich	East of England	1963	1963	16,945	Norwich
	University of East London	London	London	1898	1992	26,755	
	Edge Hill University	Ormskirk	North West England	1885	2006	13,330	Ormskirk, Lancashire
	Edinburgh Napier University	Edinburgh	Scotland	1964	1992	13,805	
	University of Edinburgh	Edinburgh	Scotland	1583	1583	39,015	
	University of Essex	Colchester	East of England	1964	1965	14,015	Campuses at Colchester and Southend-on-Sea
	University of Exeter	Exeter	South West England	1838	1955	33,105	
	Falmouth University	Falmouth, Penryn	South West England	1902	2012	8,185	
	Glasgow Caledonian University	Glasgow	Scotland	1875	1993	22,205	Formed by the merger of The Queen's College, Glasgow and Glasgow Polytechnic.
	University of Glasgow	Glasgow	Scotland	1451	1451	38,710	
	University of Gloucestershire	Cheltenham, Gloucester	South West England	1834	2001	8,135	Two campuses at Cheltenham and two at Gloucester.
	Goldsmiths, University of London	London	London	1891	2024	7,910	A member institution of the University of London. Since 2013 Goldsmiths has had its own degree awarding power.
	University of Greater Manchester	Bolton	North West England	1824	2004	12,570	Previously called the University of Bolton
	University of Greenwich	London	London	1890	1992	29,410	
	Harper Adams University	Edgmond	West Midlands	1901	2012	5,285	Newport, Shropshire
	Hartpury University	Hartpury	South West England	1947	2018	2,550	Gloucestershire
None	Health Sciences University	Bournemouth	South West England	1917	2024	2,110	Bournemouth and London
	Heriot-Watt University	Edinburgh	Scotland	1821	1966	9,845	Campuses at Edinburgh and Galashiels
	University of Hertfordshire	Hatfield	East of England	1952	1992	33,575	Hatfield
	University of the Highlands and Islands	Inverness	Scotland	1992	2011	8,685	Federal university with a main campus at Inverness, and colleges at Elgin, Perth & across north and western Scotland
	University of Huddersfield	Huddersfield	Yorkshire and the Humber	1825	1992	16,360	Campuses at Huddersfield and Barnsley
	University of Hull	Kingston upon Hull	Yorkshire and the Humber	1927	1954	14,715	
	Imperial College London	London	London	1845 (Royal College of Science) 1907 (Imperial College)	2007	22,525	Despite its name, Imperial College holds full university status.
	Keele University	Keele	West Midlands	1949	1962	13,680	Staffordshire
	University of Kent	Canterbury	South East England	1965	1965	16,070	Campuses at Canterbury and Medway. Collegiate university
	King's College London	London	London	1829	2023	40,870	Member institution of the University of London. Since 2008 King's awarded its own degrees.
	Kingston University	London	London	1899	1992	18,815	Kingston upon Thames
	University of Lancashire	Preston	North West England	1828	1992	23,865	Campuses at Preston and Burnley.
	Lancaster University	Lancaster	North West England	1964	1964	18,620	Collegiate university
	University of Law	Birmingham, Bristol, Leeds, Manchester, Nottingham	Multi-region (England)	1865	2012	8,000	Private university
None	Leeds Arts University	Leeds	Yorkshire and the Humber	1846	2017	2,175	
	Leeds Beckett University	Leeds	Yorkshire and the Humber	1824	1992	22,290	
	Leeds Trinity University	Leeds	Yorkshire and the Humber	1966	2012	13,715	
	University of Leeds	Leeds	Yorkshire and the Humber	1831	1904	34,580	Formerly part of the federal Victoria University
	University of Leicester	Leicester	East Midlands	1921	1957	18,990	
	Lincoln Bishop University	Lincoln	East Midlands	1862	2012	2,360	Lincoln
	University of Lincoln	Lincoln	East Midlands	1861	1992	19,560	Campuses at Lincoln, Riseholme, and Holbeach
	Liverpool Hope University	Liverpool	North West England	1844	2005	5,330	
	Liverpool John Moores University	Liverpool	North West England	1823	1992	25,650	
	University of Liverpool	Liverpool	North West England	1881	1903	31,050	Formerly part of the federal Victoria University
	London Metropolitan University	London	London	1848	2002	13,665	Formed by merger of London Guildhall University and the University of North London
	London School of Economics	London	London	1895	2022	12,950	Member institution of the University of London. Since 2008 the LSE has awarded its own degrees.
	London South Bank University	London	London	1892	1992	15,760	
	University of London	London	London	1836	1836	205,400	Federal university
	Loughborough University	Loughborough	East Midlands	1909	1966	18,955	
	Manchester Metropolitan University	Manchester	North West England	1824	1992	39,395	
	University of Manchester	Manchester	North West England	1824	2004	46,305	Formed by merger of the Victoria University of Manchester (itself formed by the merger of Owens College and the Victoria University) and UMIST in 2004
	Middlesex University	London	London	1878	1992	15,020	London
	Newcastle University	Newcastle	North East England	1834	1963	27,230	
	Norland University of Early Childhood	Bath	South West England	1892	2026		
	University of Northampton	Northampton	East Midlands	1924	2005	13,505	
None	Northeastern University – London	London	London	2010	2022	1,060	Subsidiary of Northeastern University in the US. Formerly the New College of the Humanities.
	Northumbria University	Newcastle	North East England	1877	1992	29,685	
None	Norwich University of the Arts	Norwich	East of England	1843	2013	2,765	
	Nottingham Trent University	Nottingham	East Midlands	1843	1992	35,435	
	University of Nottingham	Nottingham	East Midlands	1798	1948	36,460	
	Open University	Milton Keynes	East of England	1969	1969	124,580	Milton Keynes (an open-access distance learning university)
None	Oxford Brookes University	Oxford	South East England	1865	1992	26,095	
	University of Oxford	Oxford	South East England	1096	1200–1214	26,225	Collegiate university. Teaching as early as 1096; schools organised into a university from c. 1200, with statutes given by a legatine charter in 1214.
	Plymouth Marjon University	Plymouth	South West England	1993	2013	4,850	Formerly the University of St. Mark & St. John
	University of Plymouth	Plymouth	South West England	1862	1992	17,945	
	University of Portsmouth	Portsmouth	South East England	1870	1992	24,015	
	Queen Margaret University	Musselburgh	Scotland	1875	2007	6,590	2007/2008 moved to a new campus in Musselburgh, East Lothian.
	Queen Mary University of London	London	London	1785	2023	24,640	A member institution of the University of London which has awarded its own degrees since 2014.
	Queen's University Belfast	Belfast	Northern Ireland	1810	1908	25,080	
None	Ravensbourne University London	London	London	1962	2018	8,685	London
	University of Reading	Reading	South East England	1892	1926	21,370	
None	Regent's University London	London	London	1984	2013	2,171	Private university
	Richmond American University London	London	London	1972	2019	1,600	Private university
	Robert Gordon University	Aberdeen	Scotland	1750	1992	14,840	Aberdeen
None	University of Roehampton	London	London	1975	2004	11,945	Collegiate university with four colleges
	Royal Agricultural University	Cirencester	South West England	1845	2013	925	Cirencester
	Royal Holloway, University of London	Egham	South East England	1879	2022	13,115	Member institution of the University of London; since 2022 a university in its own right.
	Royal Veterinary College	London	London	1791	2023	2,575	Member institution of the University of London. University in its own right since 2023.
	University of Salford	Salford	North West England	1850	1967	26,030	
	Sheffield Hallam University	Sheffield	Yorkshire and the Humber	1843	1992	30,765	
	University of Sheffield	Sheffield	Yorkshire and the Humber	1897	1905	28,280	
	SOAS University of London	London	London	1916	2023	6,400	A member institution of the University of London with degree awarding powers since 2013. University in its own right since 2023.
	University of South Wales	Cardiff, Newport, Pontypridd	Wales	1841	2013	20,790	Merger of University of Wales, Newport and University of Glamorgan
	Southampton Solent University	Southampton	South East England	1984	2005	8,515	Southampton
	University of Southampton	Southampton	South East England	1862	1952	25,785	
	University of St Andrews	St Andrews	Scotland	1413	1413	11,645	
	St Mary's University, Twickenham	London	London	1850	2014	5,965	
	University of Staffordshire	Stoke-on-Trent	West Midlands	1906	1992	17,085	Campuses at Stoke-on-Trent, Stafford, and Lichfield
	University of Stirling	Stirling	Scotland	1967	1967	11,750	Bridge of Allan
	University of Strathclyde	Glasgow	Scotland	1796	1964	22,225	Glasgow
None	University of Suffolk	Ipswich	East of England	2007	2016	13,590	Campuses at Ipswich, Bury St. Edmunds, Great Yarmouth, and Lowestoft
	University of Sunderland	Sunderland	North East England	1901	1992	20,280	
	University of Surrey	Guildford	South East England	1891	1966	16,430	Guildford
	University of Sussex	Brighton and Hove	South East England	1959	1961	17,290	Brighton
	Swansea University	Swansea	Wales	1920	2007	18,985	
	Teesside University	Middlesbrough	North East England	1930	1992	21,570	Campuses at Middlesbrough and Darlington
	Ulster University	Belfast, Coleraine, Jordanstown, Derry	Northern Ireland	1865	1984	32,915	Formed by merger of the New University of Ulster and Ulster Polytechnic
	University College Birmingham	Birmingham	West Midlands	1957	2012	6,760	Despite its name, University College Birmingham holds full university status.
None	University College London	London	London	1826	2023	46,830	Member institution of the University of London; since 2023 a university in its own right.
	University of Wales Trinity Saint David	Cardiff, Carmathen, Swansea	Wales	1822	2010	15,415	UWTSD. Formed by merger of the University of Wales, Lampeter, Trinity College, Carmarthen and Swansea Metropolitan University. Campuses at Lampeter, Carmarthen and Swansea.
	University of Wales	Cardiff	Wales	1893	1893	15,415	Functionally merged with UWTSD in 2017 but still constitutionally separate
	University of Warwick	Coventry	West Midlands	1965	1965	27,880	Coventry
	University of the West of England	Bristol	South West England	1856	1992	36,380	Bristol
	University of the West of Scotland	Ayr, Dumfries, Hamilton, Paisley	Scotland	1897	1992	19,105	Campuses at Paisley, Hamilton, Ayr, and Dumfries
None	University of West London	London	London	1860	1992	17,690	Campuses at Ealing and Brentford in West London, and Reading.
	University of Westminster	London	London	1838	1992	20,940	
	University of Winchester	Winchester	South East England	1840	2005	6,840	
	University of Wolverhampton	Wolverhampton	West Midlands	1899	1992	23,665	
	University of Worcester	Worcester	West Midlands	1946	2005	8,755	
	Wrexham University	Wrexham	Wales	1887	2008	8,560	
	York St John University	York	Yorkshire and the Humber	1841	2006	12,150	
	University of York	York	Yorkshire and the Humber	1963	1963	22,345	

== University colleges ==
This is a list of university colleges in the UK. Institutions included on this list are university colleges that are recognised bodies with their own degree awarding powers; it does not include institutions with "university college" in their title that are listed bodies as parts of a university (see colleges within universities in the United Kingdom), or other institutions with "university college" in their title. Separate citations are given for institutions that have been awarded university college title recently and are not yet shown under that name on the recognised bodies list or which do not use the title in their name.

Arms	University	Established	University college status	Total students	Notes
	University College of Estate Management	1919	2016	3,580	Reading; Application for university status approved 2025 but awaiting supplemental charter; currently using University of the Built Environment as a trading name.

== Member institutions of the University of London ==
All member institutions of the University of London are recognised bodies as institutions that have the right to grant University of London degrees. Some also hold their own degree awarding powers and, since the passing of the University of London Act 2018, can apply for university status in their own right without leaving the federal university. Member institutions that are also universities in their own right are listed both here and in the list of universities above. The university was an examining board until 1900, when it became a federal university and admitted colleges as "Schools of the University".

Arms	University	Established	Joined University of London	Total students (2024/25)	Notes
	Birkbeck, University of London	1823	1920	7,720	A university in its own right since 2023, with degree awarding powers since 2012.
	Brunel University of London	1798	2024	12,705	A university since 1966, became a member institution of the University of London in 2024.
	City St George's, University of London	1834	2016	27,230	Formed in 2024 by merger of City, University of London and St George's, University of London. City became a member institution of the University of London in 2016, and became a university in its own right again in 2023.
None	Royal Central School of Speech and Drama	1906	2005	1,015	Degree awarding powers since 2005.
None	Courtauld Institute of Art	1932	2002	630	
	Goldsmiths, University of London	1891	1905	7,910	Became an institution owned by the university in 1905 and a school of the university in 1988. A university in its own right since 2024, with degree awarding powers since 2013.
None	Institute of Cancer Research	1909	2003	370	
	King's College London	1829	1900	40,870	Along with University College London, one of the two colleges named in the 1836 charter as having the right to submit students for examination and an original school of the university in 1900. Since 2023 a university in its own right.
None	London Business School	1964	1964	2,275	
	London School of Economics	1895	1900	12,950	Original school of the university in 1900. Since 2023 a university in its own right.
None	London School of Hygiene & Tropical Medicine	1899	1900	945	Original school of the university in 1900. Degree awarding powers since 2013. Approved for university status and applying for supplemental charter in 2024/5.
	Queen Mary University of London	1785	1907	24,640	A university in its own right since 2023, which awarded its own degrees since 2014.
	Royal Academy of Music	1822	1999	775	Degree awarding powers since 2012.
	Royal Holloway, University of London	1879	1900	13,115	Original school of the university in 1900. Since 2022 a university in its own right.
	Royal Veterinary College	1791	1949	2,575	A university in its own right since 2023, with degree awarding powers since 2009.
	SOAS University of London	1916	1916	6,400	A university in its own right since 2023, with degree awarding powers since 2013.
None	University College London	1826	1900	51,315	Along with King's College London, one of the two colleges named in the 1836 charter as having the right to submit students for examination and an original school of the university in 1900. A university in its own right since 2023, with degree awarding powers since 2005.

== Other recognised bodies ==
This section lists other education institutions that hold their own degree awarding powers but are neither universities (or colleges of the University of London) nor university colleges.

- Architectural Association School of Architecture
- Ashridge Executive Education
- ASU London (formerly TEDI–London)
- Blackpool and The Fylde College
- College of Legal Practice
- Cornwall College
- Dyson Institute of Engineering and Technology
- ESCP Europe Business School
- Engineering College of Technology
- Guildhall School of Music and Drama
- Hult International Business School
- Institute of Contemporary Music Performance
- Liverpool Institute for Performing Arts
- Liverpool School of Tropical Medicine
- LTE Group
- London Academy of Music and Dramatic Art
- London Interdisciplinary School
- Luminate Education Group
- Multiverse
- National Film and Television School
- New Model Institute for Technology and Engineering
- NCG (Newcastle College Group)
- The Northern School of Art
- Northern School of Contemporary Dance
- Norland College
- Presbyterian Theological Faculty, Ireland (Union Theological College)
- Rose Bruford College of Theatre and Performance
- Royal College of Art
- Royal College of Music
- Royal Conservatoire of Scotland
- Royal Northern College of Music
- S P Jain London School of Management Limited
- School-Led Development Trust (National Institute of Teaching)
- SRUC
- TEC Partnership
- Trinity Laban Conservatoire of Music and Dance
- Walbrook Institute London
- Warwickshire College

=== Recognised bodies that can only award foundation degrees ===
These institutions are recognised bodies with foundation degree awarding powers only.

- Hull College
- New College, Durham

== Defunct university institutions ==
This section lists defunct universities, university colleges, polytechnics and colleges of federal universities.

- University of Durham:
  - Armstrong College, Durham – Merged with University of Durham College of Medicine to form King's College, Durham (now Newcastle University)
  - University of Durham College of Medicine – Merged with Armstrong College, Durham to form King's College, Durham (now Newcastle University)
- Fraserburgh University, Aberdeenshire (1592–1605)
- University of Glamorgan, Cardiff, Trefforest and Glyntaff – Merged with University of Wales, Newport to form University of South Wales
- King's College, Aberdeen – Merged with Marischal College, Aberdeen to form University of Aberdeen
- University of London:
  - Bedford College, London – Merged with Royal Holloway College to form Royal Holloway and Bedford New College (now Royal Holloway, University of London)
  - Heythrop College – closed 2018
  - St George's, University of London – Merged with City, University of London to form City St George's, University of London
  - Westfield College, London – Merged with Queen Mary, University of London
  - Wye College – Merged with Imperial College
- London Guildhall University – Merged with University of North London to form London Metropolitan University

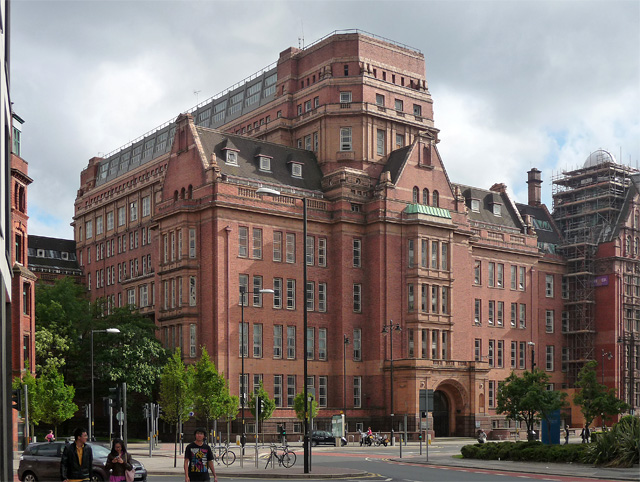
Former University of Manchester Institute of Science and Technology (UMIST) main building, now used by The University of Manchester

- University of Manchester Institute of Science and Technology (UMIST) – Merged to form University of Manchester
- Marischal College, Aberdeen (1593–1858) – Merged with King's College, Aberdeen to form University of Aberdeen
- Mason Science College, Birmingham – Merged to form Mason College, now the University of Birmingham
- University of North London – Merged with London Guildhall University to form London Metropolitan University
- University of Northampton (1261–1265) (not to be confused with the current University of Northampton, which has no direct connection with the medieval foundation)
- Queen's University of Ireland, Belfast, Cork and Galway – Closed, replaced by Royal University of Ireland
- Royal University of Ireland, Belfast, Cork and Galway – Closed, replaced by National University of Ireland
- University College Salford – Merged with the University of Salford
- University College Scarborough – taken over by University of Hull
- University of Stamford (1333–1335)
- Federal University of Surrey – Divided into University of Surrey and Roehampton University
- Surrey Institute of Art & Design, University College, Farnham and Epsom – Merged to form University for the Creative Arts
- Swansea Metropolitan University – Merged with University of Wales Trinity Saint David
- Trinity University College, Carmarthen – Merged with University of Wales, Lampeter to form University of Wales Trinity Saint David
- Ulster Polytechnic – Merged with New University of Ulster to form University of Ulster
- New University of Ulster – Merged with Ulster Polytechnic to form University of Ulster
- Victoria University, Manchester, Liverpool and Leeds – Merged with Owen's College, Manchester, to form Victoria University of Manchester; Other colleges become University of Leeds and University of Liverpool
- Victoria University of Manchester – Merged to form Manchester University
- University of Wales:
  - University of Wales College of Medicine, Cardiff – merged with Cardiff University
  - University of Wales Institute of Science and Technology, Cardiff – Merged with University of Wales College Cardiff to form University of Wales, Cardiff (now Cardiff University)
  - University of Wales Lampeter – Merged with Trinity University College to form University of Wales Trinity Saint David
  - University of Wales, Newport – Merged with University of Glamorgan to form University of South Wales

== Foreign universities with campuses in the United Kingdom ==
While based in the UK, these are not considered UK universities and are not recognised as UK degree-awarding bodies by the British government unless separately listed in one of the categories above. Many are 'study abroad' centres for non-UK universities, offering a year or a semester in the UK for students enrolled at the foreign university, rather than campuses offering their own courses.

As of 1 November 2023, there are 29 "Overseas Higher Education Institutions" that have been approved for student visa purposes by the UK Government as offering "an overseas course of degree level study that's equal to a UK higher education course". There is also one branch of an overseas university that is a "listed body", offering courses leading to a UK degree from a "registered body". The following are approved overseas higher education institutions and foreign universities that are listed bodies in the UK, with their UK locations:

- Advanced Studies in England Ltd, Bath
- American University of the Caribbean School of Medicine, Preston
- Amity University [IN] London, London (listed body providing courses leading to UK degrees from the University of Northampton and the University of Bolton)
- Arcadia University, Holborn
- Bader College, Hailsham (part of Queen's University at Kingston in Canada)
- Boston University London Programme, London
- Centre for Medieval and Renaissance Studies, Oxford
- Florida State University International Programs Association UK, London
- Fordham University, Tarrytown
- Georgetown University (USA) UK Initiatives Organisation, London
- Global Education Oregon in London, London
- Harlaxton College, Grantham (part of the University of Evansville)
- Healthcare Education Student Support Services Ltd, Winchester
- Ithaca College, London
- James Madison University and JMU Overseas Programs Ltd, London
- Lawrence University London Centre
- Luther College Study Centre, Nottingham
- MUN (UK) Ltd, Old Harlow (part of Memorial University)
- NYU in London, London
- Pepperdine University UK Ltd, London
- PHBS-UK, Oxford (part of Peking University HSBC Business School)
- Samford University London Study Centre, London
- St Cloud State University, Alnwick
- St. Lawrence University (USA) London Programme, London
- Syracuse University London Program, London
- Teikyo University of Japan in Durham, Durham
- University of Chicago Booth School of Business, London
- University of North Carolina, London
- University of Notre Dame, London
- Wroxton College of Fairleigh Dickinson University, Banbury

== Universities in British Dependent Territories ==
Universities in British dependent territories are not considered UK Universities and are not recognised as UK degree-awarding bodies by the British government.

=== Universities in British Overseas Territories ===
Universities in British Overseas Territories are not considered UK Universities and are not recognised as UK degree-awarding bodies by the British government.

- University of the West Indies Open Campus, with one country site in each of Anguilla, British Virgin Islands, Cayman Islands, Montserrat, and Turks and Caicos Islands.

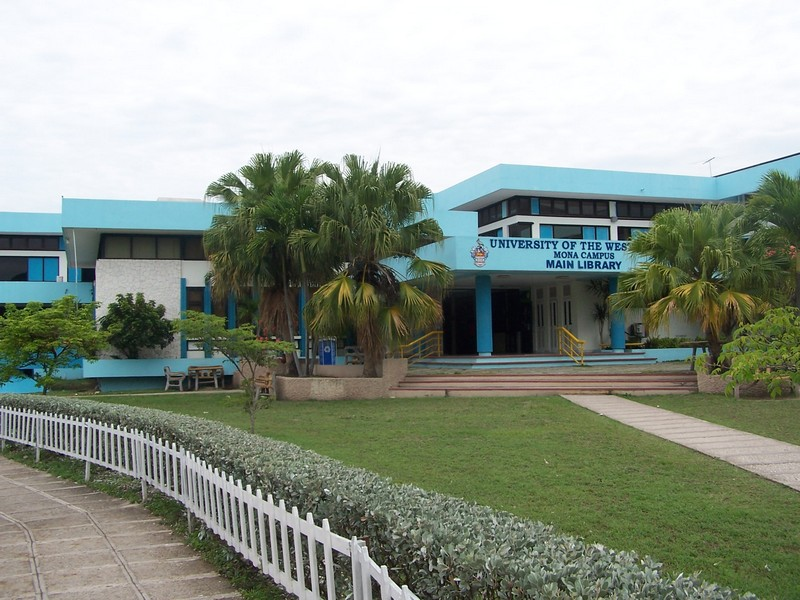
University of the West Indies in Mona

- Anguilla
  - Saint James School of Medicine
- Bermuda
  - Bermuda College
- Cayman Islands
  - Truman Bodden Law School: A law school affiliated with the University of Liverpool in the UK
- International College of the Cayman Islands: A private university
- St. Matthews University: A private institution containing a medical school and a veterinary school
- University College of the Cayman Islands: The only public university in the Cayman Islands
- Gibraltar
- University of Gibraltar
- Montserrat
- University of Science, Arts and Technology
- American University of the Caribbean
- Turks and Caicos Islands
- Charisma University

=== Universities in Crown Dependencies ===
See list of universities in the Isle of Man for university institutions on the Isle of Man. There are currently no universities in the Channel Islands; in 2013 the States of Guernsey gave approval for the opening of a university there but, as of February 2017, no progress has been made on the project. The plan was cancelled in 2021.

== See also ==
- Armorial of British universities
- Colleges within universities in the United Kingdom
- Levels of education: higher education, foundation degree and further education
- List of colleges in the United Kingdom offering higher education courses
- List of universities in the United Kingdom by endowment
- List of universities in the United Kingdom by enrolment
- List of universities in the United Kingdom by date of foundation
- List of universities in England
- List of universities and colleges in Northern Ireland
- List of universities in Scotland
- List of universities in Wales*
- Lists of universities and colleges
- Lists of universities and colleges by country
- National Union of Students of the United Kingdom
- Rankings of universities in the United Kingdom
- Tuition fees in the United Kingdom
- UCAS (Universities & Colleges Admissions Service)
- Universities in the United Kingdom
