= David Bailey (economist) =

British academic economist

Professor David Bailey
- Born: 1966 (age 59–60)
- Title: Professor of Business Economics

Academic background
- Education: University of Birmingham
- Thesis: Industrial policy in and for a globalising economy: issues and lessons from Europe, the U.S. and Japan (2003)

Academic work
- Discipline: Economics
- Sub-discipline: Business economics; industrial economics; automotive industry
- Institutions: Birmingham Business School, University of Birmingham; Coventry Business School, Coventry University; Aston Business School, Aston University

David Geoffrey Bailey (born 1966) is a British academic economist at the Birmingham Business School, University of Birmingham, a Vice-Chair of the Regional Studies Association, Editor-in-Chief of the journal Regional Studies, and senior fellow at the UK in a Changing Europe.

== Academic career ==
Bailey studied Economics at the University of Birmingham, winning the Hargreaves-Beare Prize for best graduating student and graduating with a First Class Honours degree in 1988. This was followed by a master's degree at Birmingham in Russian and East European Studies with Economics, and later a PhD at the Birmingham Business School. His doctorate was completed in 2003 and his doctoral thesis was tilted "Industrial policy in and for a globalising economy: issues and lessons from Europe, the U.S. and Japan".

He has written extensively on industrial and regional policy and globalisation, especially in relation to the auto industry, and appears frequently in the local, national and international media. Bailey was principal investigator on an ESRC funded project with Alex de Ruyter, Caroline Chapain, Gill Bentley and Stephen Hall looking at the impact of the MG Rover closure on workers, families and communities, and the policy response to this.

This ESRC funded work on the impact of the MG Rover closure has attracted widespread publicity and was featured in the first of the booklets published by the Academy of Social Science and the ESRC on 'Making the Case for Social Science'.

Bailey has held visiting posts at the University of Bologna, and in the US, Japan, France and the Czech Republic.

Bailey took up his first post at the Birmingham Business School as a Research Associate working with George Harte and Roger Sugden, and was appointed a Professor in 2006 and Director of the Birmingham Business School in 2008. He moved to Coventry University Business School in 2009. In September 2013, he was appointed as 'Professor of Industrial Strategy' at Aston Business School, Aston University, before returning to the Birmingham Business School in May 2019.

Outside of the Birmingham Business School, Bailey is Chair of the Regional Studies Association Europe Foundation, a Vice-Chair of the Regional Studies Association, having been Chair for two terms over 2006–2012, and an active blogger and columnist at The Birmingham Post newspaper. Bailey was elected an Academician of the Social Sciences in 2008.

Bailey's high media profile and numerous roles have led to him being ranked in several listings of the most influential people in the region, including those in Business Insider magazine and the Birmingham Post 'Power 50'; in the latter he was ranked at No. 8 in 2009.

Most recently he has been active through his academic work, blogs and extensive media work in keeping the plight of the ex-MG Rover workers in the public eye, in making the case for support for the firm Jaguar Land Rover, in pushing the case for support for the auto industry (earning him the nickname 'Professor Scrappage'), in the campaign to defend Cadbury's independence and to push for greater protection for UK firms from takeover, and the need for the retention of some form of regional tier post RDAs.

== Books ==
- Keeping the Wheels on the Road: UK Auto after Brexit, edited by David Bailey, Alex de Ruyter, Neil Fowler and John Mair (2019) ISBN 978-1798005156 (paperback)
- The Political Economy of Brexit, edited by David Bailey and Leslie Budd (2017) ISBN 978-1911116646 (paperback)
- Devolution and the UK Economy, edited by David Bailey and Leslie Budd (2016) ISBN 978-1783486311 (paperback)
- New Perspectives on Industrial Policy for a Modern Britain, edited by David Bailey, Keith Cowling and Philip Tomlinson (2015) ISBN 978-0-19-870620-5 (hardback)
- Industrial Policy beyond the Crisis, edited by David Bailey, Helena Lenihan and Josep-Maria Arauzo-Carod (2011) ISBN 978-0-415-68506-1 (hardback)
- The Recession and Beyond. Local and Regional Responses to the Downturn, edited by David Bailey and Caroline Chapain (2011 and 2013) ISBN 978-0-415-59034-1 (hardback) 978-0-415-71015-2 (paperback)
- Blogs from the Blackstuff. The Case for Rewiring the Economy, by David Bailey and John Clancy, (2010) Fifth Way Press, in association with Coventry University. ISBN 978-1-4452-9232-8.
- Industrial and Regional Policy in an Enlarging EU, edited by David Bailey and Lisa De Propris, (2009). ISBN 978-0-415-49822-7
- Crisis or Recovery in Japan. State and Industrial Economy, edited by David Bailey, Dan Coffey and Phil Tomlinson, (2007). ISBN 978-1-84542-095-6
- Transnationals and Governments. Recent Policies in Japan, France, Germany, the United States and Britain, by David Bailey, George Harte and Roger Sugden, (1994). ISBN 978-0-415-09825-0 (hardback) 978-0-203-06662-1 (electronic)
- Making Transnationals Accountable. A Significant Step for Britain by David Bailey, George Harte and Roger Sugden, (1994) ISBN 978-0-415-06871-0 (paperback) 978-0-415-06870-3 (hardback) 978-0-203-01666-4 (electronic)

== Regional Studies Association ==
Bailey was elected a Trustee and Board member of the Regional Studies Association (RSA) in 2004, and was elected its Chair in 2006, serving two terms until 2012. Bailey is now a Vice-Chair of the Association and Editor of the journal Regional Studies
