= List of universities in England =

As of August 2017, there were 106 universities in England and 5 university colleges out of a total of around 130 in the United Kingdom. This includes private universities but does not include other Higher Education Institutions (Note: Higher Education Institution is a term defined by the Further and Higher Education Act 1992, meaning any UK University, higher education corporation or institution designated by Parliamentary Order as eligible to receive funding grants. This does not include member institutions of the University of London that do not hold university status and are not a higher education corporation unless so designated.) that have not been given the right to call themselves "university" or "university college" by the Privy Council or Companies House (e.g. colleges of higher education), or member institutions of the University of London at that time.

The following is a list of English universities and university colleges recognised by the Office for Students (OfS), together with the date on which they were created. OfS publishes the official list.

== Universities ==
'Established' refers to the date when an institution was initially established as a university. Where two dates are listed below the first gives the year the institution became a university while the second (in parentheses) gives the year the institution was established in another form (for example, if it was previously a college or a central institution). See also List of UK universities by date of foundation. If only a dash and a year in parentheses is given, the institution is either a university college or a member institution of the University of London that does not hold university status, and the date in parentheses refers to the year of its establishment.

'Number of students' is the total number of higher education students from the Higher Education Statistics Agency tables for 2024/25 for publicly funded universities and the University of Buckingham. HESA statistics do not cover other private universities or private university colleges; student numbers for such institutions (where given) are referenced in the table.

'Tuition fee' refers to the annual tuition fee for Home/EU students studying full-time undergraduate degree courses, from the Reddin Survey of University Tuition Fees 2017–18 (except where otherwise referenced). 'p/g only' means the university was listed by the Higher Education Funding Council of England (HEFCE) as providing postgraduate courses only, so has no undergraduate tuition fees.

'Degree powers' refers to whether the university has the power to award all degrees, degrees of the University of London, or taught degrees. (Note: This information is taken from individual institution profiles on the HEFCE register.) Institutions with only foundation degree awarding powers are not eligible for university or university college title.

University	City	Region	Established	Number of students	Tuition fee	Degree powers	
Anglia Ruskin University	Cambridge, Chelmsford, Peterborough	East of England	1992 (1858)	26,715	£9,250	Full	
Arden University	Coventry	West Midlands	2015 (1990)	8,000	– (private)	Taught	
Arts University Bournemouth	Poole	South West England	2012 (1885)	3,445	£9,250	Taught	
Arts University Plymouth	Plymouth	South West England	(2022) 1856	2,000	£9,250	Taught	
University of the Arts London	London	London	2004	19,965	£9,250	Full	
Aston University	Birmingham	West Midlands	1966 (1895)	15,385	£9,250	Full	
University of Bath	Bath	South West England	1966	18,560	£9,250	Full	
Bath Spa University	Bath	South West England	2005 (1852)	8,450	£9,250	Full	
University of Bedfordshire	Bedford, Luton, Milton Keynes	East of England	1993	16,725	£9,250	Full	
University of Birmingham	Birmingham	West Midlands	1900	35,760	£9,250	Full	
University College Birmingham (Note: Despite its name, UCB holds University status)	Birmingham	West Midlands	2012 (1957)	4,930	£9,076	Taught	
Birmingham City University	Birmingham	West Midlands	1992 (1843)	26,930	£9,250	Full	
Bishop Grosseteste University	Lincoln	East Midlands	2012 (1862)	2,280	£9,250	Taught	
Bournemouth University	Bournemouth, Poole	South West England	1992	17,390	£9,250	Full	
BPP University	Abingdon, Birmingham, Bristol, Cambridge, Leeds, Liverpool, London, Manchester	East of England, London; North West England, South East England, South West England, West Midlands, Yorkshire and the Humber	2013 (1992)	6,780	– (private)	Taught	
University of Bradford	Bradford	Yorkshire and the Humber	1966 (1957)	9,770	£9,250	Full	
University of Brighton	Brighton, Eastbourne	South East England	1992 (1859)	18,985	£9,250	Full	
University of Bristol	Bristol	South West England	1909 (1876)	27,375	£9,250	Full	
Brunel University London	London	London	1966	15,520	£9,250	Full	
University of Buckingham	Buckingham	South East England	1983 (1973)	3,100	£12,444 (private)	Full	
Buckinghamshire New University	High Wycombe, London	South East England, London	2007 (1999)	14,075	£7,800–9,250	Taught	
University of Cambridge	Cambridge	East of England	1209	21,340	£9,250	Full	
Canterbury Christ Church University	Broadstairs, Canterbury, Medway, Tunbridge Wells	South East England	2005 (1977)	13,340	£9,250	Full	
University of Central Lancashire	Preston	North West England	1992 (1828)	24,715	£9,250	Full	
University of Chester	Chester, Warrington	North West England	2005 (1839)	13,545	£9,250	Full	
University of Chichester	Chichester	South East England	2005 (1977)	5,545	£6,000–9,250	Full	
Coventry University	Coventry	West Midlands	1992 (1843)	38,430	£6,009–9,250	Full	
Cranfield University	Cranfield, Shrivenham	East of England	1993 (1946)	4,825	p/g only	Full	
University for the Creative Arts	Canterbury, Epsom, Farnham, Maidstone, Rochester	South East England	2005	6,765	£9,250	Taught	
University of Cumbria	Ambleside, Barrow, Carlisle, Lancaster, Penrith, London	North West England	2007	7,945	£9,250	Taught	
De Montfort University	Leicester	East Midlands	1992 (1969)	29,000	£9,250	Full	
University of Derby	Derby	East Midlands	1992 (1977)	19,685	£9,250	Full	
Durham University	Durham, Stockton	North East England	1832	19,520	£9,250	Full	
University of East Anglia	Norwich	East of England	1963	18,035	£9,250	Full	
University of East London	London	London	1992 (1970)	15,355	£9,250	Full	
Edge Hill University	Ormskirk	North West England	2006 (1959)	13,560	£9,250	Full	
University of Essex	Colchester	East of England	1964	16,530	£9,250	Full	
University College of Estate Management	Reading	South East England	– (1919)	–	– (private)	Taught	
University of Exeter	Exeter, Penryn	South West England	1955 (1922)	26,935	£9,250	Full	
Falmouth University	Falmouth, Penryn	South West England	2012 (1902)	6,245	£9,250	Taught	
University of Gloucestershire	Cheltenham, Gloucester	South West England	2001 (1998)	7,915	£9,250	Full	
University of Greater Manchester	Bolton	North West England	2005 (1982)	8,175	£9,250	Full	
University of Greenwich	London	London	1992 (1890)	19,825	£9,250	Full	
Harper Adams University	Edgmond	West Midlands	2012 (1901)	4,680	£9,250	Full	
Hartpury University	Gloucester	South West England	2018 (1947)			Taught	
Health Sciences University	Bournemouth	South West England	2024 (1965)	–	£9,250	Taught	
University of Hertfordshire	Hatfield	East of England	1992 (1952)	25,520	£9,250	Full	
University of Huddersfield	Huddersfield	Yorkshire and the Humber	1992 (1825)	17,305	£9,250	Full	
University of Hull	Hull, Scarborough	Yorkshire and the Humber	1954 (1927)	14,255	£9,250	Full	
Imperial College London (Note: Despite its name, Imperial holds University status)	London	London	2007 (1907)	19,400	£9,250	Full	
Keele University	Keele	West Midlands	1962 (1949)	10,880	£9,250	Full	
University of Kent	Canterbury, Medway, Tonbridge, Athens, Brussels, Paris, Rome	South East England	1965	18,710	£9,250	Full	
Kingston University	London	London	1992 (1899)	18,070	£9,250	Full	
Lancaster University	Lancaster	North West England	1964	15,665	£9,250	Full	
University of Law	Birmingham, Bristol, Chester, Guildford, Leeds, London, Nottingham	England	2012	16,000	£6,165–9,000	Taught	
University of Leeds	Leeds	Yorkshire and the Humber	1904	36,330	£9,250	Full	
Leeds Arts University	Leeds	Yorkshire and the Humber	2017 (1846)	2,145		Taught	
Leeds Beckett University	Leeds	Yorkshire and the Humber	1992 (1970)	23,290	£9,250	Full	
Leeds Trinity University	Leeds	Yorkshire and the Humber	2012 (1966)	4,985	£9,250	Taught	
University of Leicester	Leicester	East Midlands	1957 (1921)	16,180	£9,250	Full	
University of Lincoln	Lincoln	East Midlands	1992	16,425	£9,250	Full	
University of Liverpool	Liverpool	North West England	1903	29,600	£9,250	Full	
Liverpool Hope University	Liverpool	North West England	2005 (1844)	4,985	£9,250	Full	
Liverpool John Moores University	Liverpool	North West England	1992 (1892)	25,050	£9,250	Full	
University of London	London, Paris	London	1836	330 (Note: "institutes and activities" – does not include students at colleges of the University)	– (Fees set by colleges)	Full	
→ Birkbeck, University of London	London	London	– (1823)	11,425	£9,250	Full, London	
→ City, University of London	London	London	– (1894)	19,975	£9,250	Full, London	
→ Courtauld Institute of Art	London	London	– (1932)	545	£9,250	London	London
→ Goldsmiths, University of London	London	London	– (1904)	10,090	£9,250	London	London
→ Heythrop College	London	London	– (1614)		No longer admitting students	London	London
→ Institute of Cancer Research	London	London	– (1909)	280	p/g only	London	London
→ King's College London	London	London	– (1829) founding college	33,110	£9,250	London	London
→ London Business School	London	London	– (1964)	2,305	p/g only	London	London
→ London School of Economics	London	London	– (1895)	12,050	£9,250	London	London
→ London School of Hygiene & Tropical Medicine	London	London	– (1899)	1,090	p/g only	London	London
→ Queen Mary, University of London	London	London	– (1887)	21,665	£9,250	London	London
→ Royal Academy of Music	London	London	– (1822)	860	£9,250	London	London
→ Royal Central School of Speech and Drama	London	London	– (1906)	1,100	£9,250	London	London
→ Royal Holloway, University of London	Egham	South East England	– (1849)	11,530	£9,250		
→ Royal Veterinary College	London	London	– (1791)	2,510	£9,250	London	London
→ St George's, University of London	London	London	– (1733)	4,330	£9,250	London	London
→ School of Oriental and African Studies	London	London	– (1916)	5,795	£9,250	London	London
→ University College London	London	London	– (1826) founding college	41,095	£9,250	London	London
London Institute of Banking & Finance (Note: Holds university college status)	London	London	– (1879)	–	– (private)	Taught	
London Metropolitan University	London	London	2002	10,390	£6,750–9,250	Full	
London South Bank University	London	London	1992 (1892)	16,840	£9,000	Full	
Loughborough University	Loughborough	East Midlands	1966	18,295	£9,250	Full	
University of Manchester	Manchester	North West England	2004 (1824)	40,485	£9,250	Full	
Manchester Metropolitan University	Manchester	North West England	1992 (1970)	33,420	£9,250	Full	
Middlesex University	London	London	1992 (1973)	20,175	£9,250	Full	
Newcastle University	Newcastle upon Tyne	North East England	1963 (1834)	28,070	£9,250	Full	
Newman University	Birmingham	West Midlands	2012 (1968)	2,795	£9,250	Taught	
University of Northampton	Northampton	East Midlands	2005 (1975)	12,060	£9,250	Full	
Northumbria University	Newcastle upon Tyne	North East England	1992 (1892)	28,325	£9,250	Full	
Norwich University of the Arts	Norwich	East of England	2012 (1845)	2,360	£9,250	Taught	
University of Nottingham	Nottingham	East Midlands	1948 (1881)	34,840	£9,250	Full	
Nottingham Trent University	Nottingham	East Midlands	1992 (1843)	35,785	£9,250	Full	
Open University	Milton Keynes	East of England	1969	101,490 (Note: "in England" – also has students in other parts of the UK)	–	Full	
University College of Osteopathy	London	London	– (1917)	–	–	Taught	
University of Oxford	Oxford	South East England	1096	25,910	£9,250	Full	
Oxford Brookes University	Oxford	South East England	1992 (1970)	16,900	£9,250	Full	
Plymouth University	Plymouth	South West England	1992 (1862)	18,410	£9,250	Full	
University of Portsmouth	Portsmouth	South East England	1992 (1960)	26,775	£9,250	Full	
Ravensbourne University London	London	London	2018 (1962)	–	–	Taught	
University of Reading	Reading	South East England	1926 (1892)	18,735	£9,250	Full	
Regent's University London	London	London	2013 (1984)	–	– (private)	Taught	
Roehampton University	London	London	2004 (1841)	12,495	£9,250	Taught	
Royal Agricultural University	Cirencester	South West England	2012 (1845)	1,125	£9,250	Taught	
University of Salford	Salford	North West England	1967	21,500	£9,250	Full	
University of Sheffield	Sheffield	Yorkshire and the Humber	1905	30,055	£9,250	Full	
Sheffield Hallam University	Sheffield	Yorkshire and the Humber	1992	30,960	£9,250	Full	
University of Southampton	Southampton	South West England	1952 (1902)	22,665	£9,250	Full	
Southampton Solent University	Southampton	South West England	2005 (1984)	10,510	£9,250	Full	
University of St Mark & St John	Plymouth	South West England	2012 (1923)	2,750	£9,250	Taught	
St Mary's University, Twickenham	London	London	2014 (1850)	5,520	£9,250	Taught	
Staffordshire University	Lichfield, Shrewsbury, Stafford, Stoke	West Midlands	1992	15,675	£9,250	Full	
University of Suffolk	Ipswich, Bury St Edmunds, Great Yarmouth, Lowestoft	East of England	2016 (2007)	9,565	£9,250	Taught	
University of Sunderland	Sunderland	North East England	1992 (1901)	15,740	£9,250	Full	
University of Surrey	Guildford	South East England	1966 (1891)	16,990	£9,250	Full	
University of Sussex	Falmer, Brighton	South East England	1961	19,395	£9,250	Full	
Teesside University	Darlington, Middlesbrough	North East England	1992 (1930)	19,290	£9,250	Full	
University of Warwick	Coventry	West Midlands	1965	26,825	£9,250	Full	
University of West London	London	London, South East England	1992	11,985	£9,250	Full	
University of the West of England	Bristol	South West England	1992 (1595)	30,680	£9,250	Full	
University of Westminster	London	London	1992 (1838)	19,470	£9,250	Full	
University of Winchester	Winchester	South East England	2005 (1840)	8,000	£9,250	Full	
University of Wolverhampton	Burton, Telford, Walsall, Wolverhampton	West Midlands	1992 (1969)	18,875	£9,250	Full	
University of Worcester	Worcester	West Midlands	1997	10,180	£9,250	Full	
Writtle University College	Chelmsford	East of England	– (1893)	765	£9,250	Taught	
University of York	York	Yorkshire and the Humber	1963	19,790	£9,250	Full	
York St John University	York	Yorkshire and the Humber	2006 (1841)	7,000	£9,250	Full	

== See also ==
- List of universities in the United Kingdom
- List of universities in Northern Ireland
- List of universities in Scotland
- List of universities in Wales
- List of universities in Yorkshire and the Humber
