= List of universities in Yorkshire and the Humber =

Yorkshire and the Humber

A list of universities in Yorkshire and the Humber, educational institutions with university status by the Office for Students (formerly the Privy Council of the United Kingdom)and mainly based in England's Yorkshire and the Humber region, are institutions running courses at both undergraduate (operated by UCAS) and postgraduate levels. They are all state financed, apart from the private University of Law.

The region's main public research universities are: University of Bradford, University of Huddersfield, University of Hull, University of Leeds, Leeds Beckett University, University of Sheffield, Sheffield Hallam University, and the University of York. Many of the institutions have histories pre-dating their university. For example, Sheffield Hallam University was previously Sheffield Polytechnic while York St John University was previously York St John University College and the College of Ripon and York St John.

Most of the universities are completely located in regions, except the University of Huddersfield which has a campus in Oldham of North West England. It also has a campus at Barnsley in the region. Additionally, Coventry University of the West Midlands) has a campus in Scarborough while the Open University (a national distance learning institution headquartered in Milton Keynes of South East England) has a regional office in Leeds.

There are a number of educational institutions in the region offering degrees. These include Leeds Conservatoire and Northern School of Contemporary Dance as well as further and Higher education colleges across the region.

Absent from the list is the Teesside University, located in Middlesbrough of North East England. The area is located in the historic North Riding of Yorkshire and ceremonial North Yorkshire. The University of Lincoln, formerly the University of Humberside, was based in the region until it relocated to Lincoln in the early 21st century, closing its campus in Hull. The idea of it returning to the region with a new campus in Grimsby was mooted in 2019.

Name	Established	Location	Students Attending
University of Bradford	1966	Bradford	13,600
University of Huddersfield	1992	Huddersfield, Barnsley and Oldham	19,740
University of Hull	1954	Hull	22,275
The University of Law	1962	Leeds	
University of Leeds	1904	Leeds	33,315
Leeds Beckett University	1992	Leeds	39,310
Leeds Trinity University	1966	Leeds	3,000
Leeds Arts University	1846 (University status: 2017)	Leeds	1,320
University of Sheffield	1905	Sheffield	25,700
Sheffield Hallam University	1992	Sheffield	30,009
University of York	1963	York	13,270
York St John University	2006	York	6,435
