= Bachelor of Commerce =

Undergraduate degree in business

A Bachelor of Commerce (BCom or B Com) is an undergraduate degree in commerce, accounting, mathematics, economics, finance and management-related subjects. It is mainly offered in Commonwealth nations.

== Structure ==
The Bachelor of Commerce degree is designed to provide students with a range of applicable commerce-skills, while building competence in a particular area. Programs typically comprise introductory courses in commercial law, business mathematics and business management, as well as foundational courses in accounting and economics. Students then select courses in their specialization or major; often these latter, or in more specific areas such as marketing, risk, finance, operations, human resources, or industrial psychology.

The Honours Bachelor of Commerce (HonsBCom or BComm (Hons) or HBCom) may consist of a four-year program or of a one-year program taken subsequent to a three-year Bachelors; the one-year program is typically focused exclusively on a single subject-area, and may include a research component.

== History ==
The Bachelor of Commerce degree was first offered at the University of Birmingham. The University's School of Commerce was founded by William Ashley, an Englishman from Oxford University, who was the first professor of Political Economy and Constitutional History in the Faculty of Arts at the University of Toronto. Ashley left Toronto in 1892, spent a few years at Harvard University, and then went back to England to the new University of Birmingham where he founded the School of Commerce. Ashley began the programme which was the forerunner of many other BCom degree programmes throughout the British Empire.

== See also ==
- Master of Commerce
- Doctor of Commerce
- Business education § Undergraduate education
- Commerce § Education
