= Birmingham Business School =

Birmingham Business School may refer to:

- Birmingham Business School (University of Birmingham)
- Birmingham City Business School
