= CU Coventry =

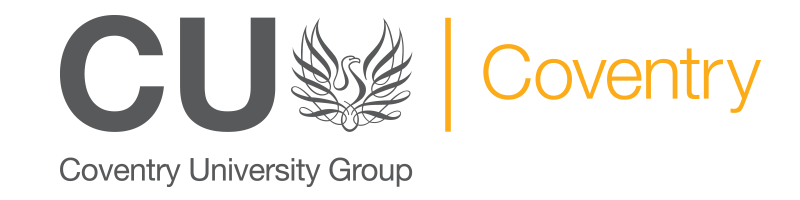
- Type: Public
- Established: 2012
- Students: 2,000+
- Location: Coventry, England
- Website: www.coventry.ac.uk/cuc

CU Coventry is a higher education institition and part of Coventry UniversityGroup. It has been in operation since 2012, and was formerly known as Coventry University College. Its campus is located on Mile Lane in the city of Coventry, England.

It is part of CU Group, a network of three higher education campuses, comprising CU Coventry, CU London and CU Scarborough, all part of the Coventry University Group.

== History ==
Coventry University College was founded in 2012 as a subsidiary of Coventry University Group, taking on its new name CU Coventry in 2017.

== Higher Education courses ==
Degrees, degree with foundation year and Higher Technical Qualifications (HTQs) are delivered at CU Coventry.

Courses include:

- Applied Biosciences
- Business Management and Leadership
- Cloud Computing
- Computing and Information Systems
- Construction Management for England (HTQ)
- Early Childhood Development and Learning
- Electro-Mechanical Engineering
- Financial Management and Accounting
- Public Health and Community Studies
- Marketing and Public Relations
- Tourism and Hospitality Management
