= List of colleges in the United Kingdom offering higher education courses =

This is a list of colleges in the United Kingdom offering higher education courses. Many of the colleges below are "listed bodies" that are authorised to offer courses leading to a degree from a UK university or other body with degree-awarding powers. Others may offer non-degree higher education courses such as Higher National Diplomas or Higher National Certificates.

Colleges that have their own degree-awarding powers are not listed here, but at List of universities in the United Kingdom#Other recognised bodies. Colleges that are parts of universities are not listed here.

Colleges of further education that provide higher education are included here; there are separate lists for further education colleges generally at: List of further education colleges in England, List of further education colleges in Northern Ireland, List of further education colleges in Scotland, and List of further education colleges in Wales.

== England ==
=== Registered colleges ===
Institutions in England that are registered with the Office for Students as not having their own degree-awarding powers but providing courses validated by a body with degree-awarding powers as of September 2026 are:

- AAP Education (Escape Studios)
- Abingdon and Witney College
- Academy of Contemporary Music
- Activate Learning
- All Nations Christian College
- Amity Global Education
- Anglo Skills College
- Arts Educational Schools, London
- Assemblies of God
- Barnet & Southgate College
- Barnsley College
- Basingstoke College of Technology
- Bath College
- Bedford College
- Birmingham Metropolitan College
- Bishop Auckland College
- Bishop Burton College
- Blackburn College
- Bloomsbury Institute
- Bolton College
- Boston College
- Bournemouth and Poole College

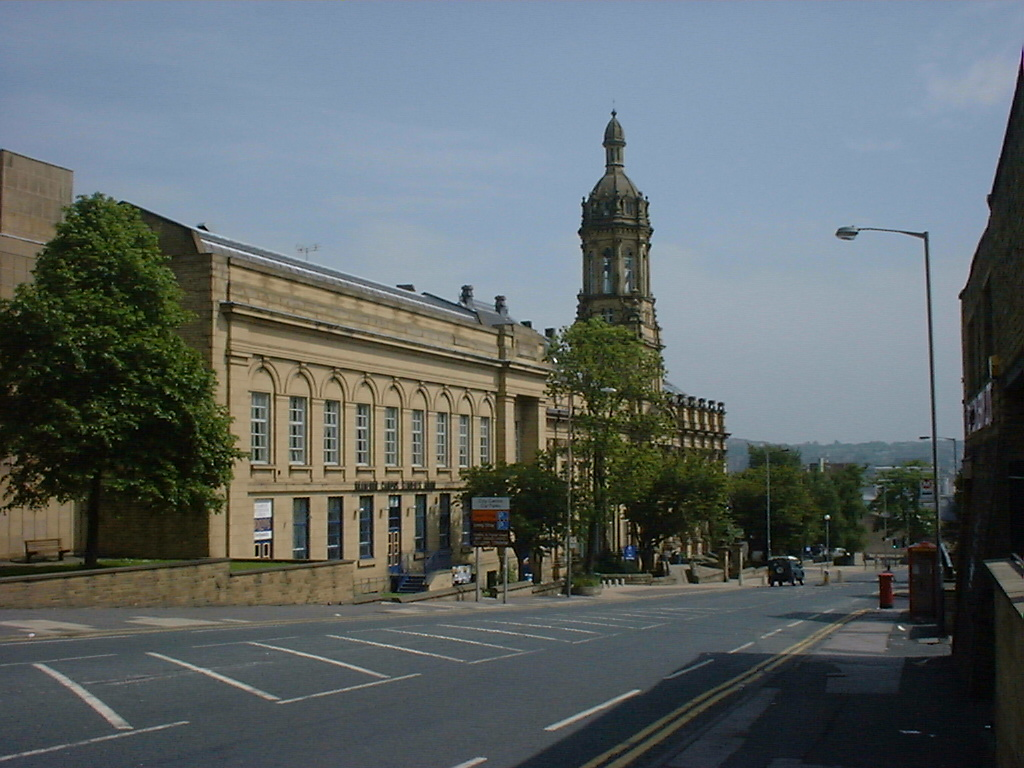
Bradford College, West Yorkshire

- Bradford College
- Bristol Baptist College
- British Academy of Jewellery
- Brockenhurst College
- Bromley College of Further and Higher Education
- Brooklands College
- Burnley College
- Bury College
- Calderdale College
- Cambridge Arts & Sciences
- Cambridge Regional College
- Cambridge Theological Federation
- Capital City College Group
- Cardinal Newman Catholic Sixth Form College
- Central Film School London
- Central School of Ballet
- Cheshire College South and West
- Chesterfield College
- Christ the Redeemer College
- Chichester College Group
- Chicken Shed Theatre Trust
- City and Guilds of London Art School
- City College Norwich
- City College Plymouth
- City of Bristol College
- City of Liverpool College
- City of Portsmouth College
- City of Wolverhampton College
- Cliff College
- Colchester Institute
- College of Dentistry
- College of Health
- College of Integrated Chinese Medicine
- Commonwealth College of Excellence
- Council of the Inns of Court
- Court Theatre Training Company
- Coventry College
- Craven College

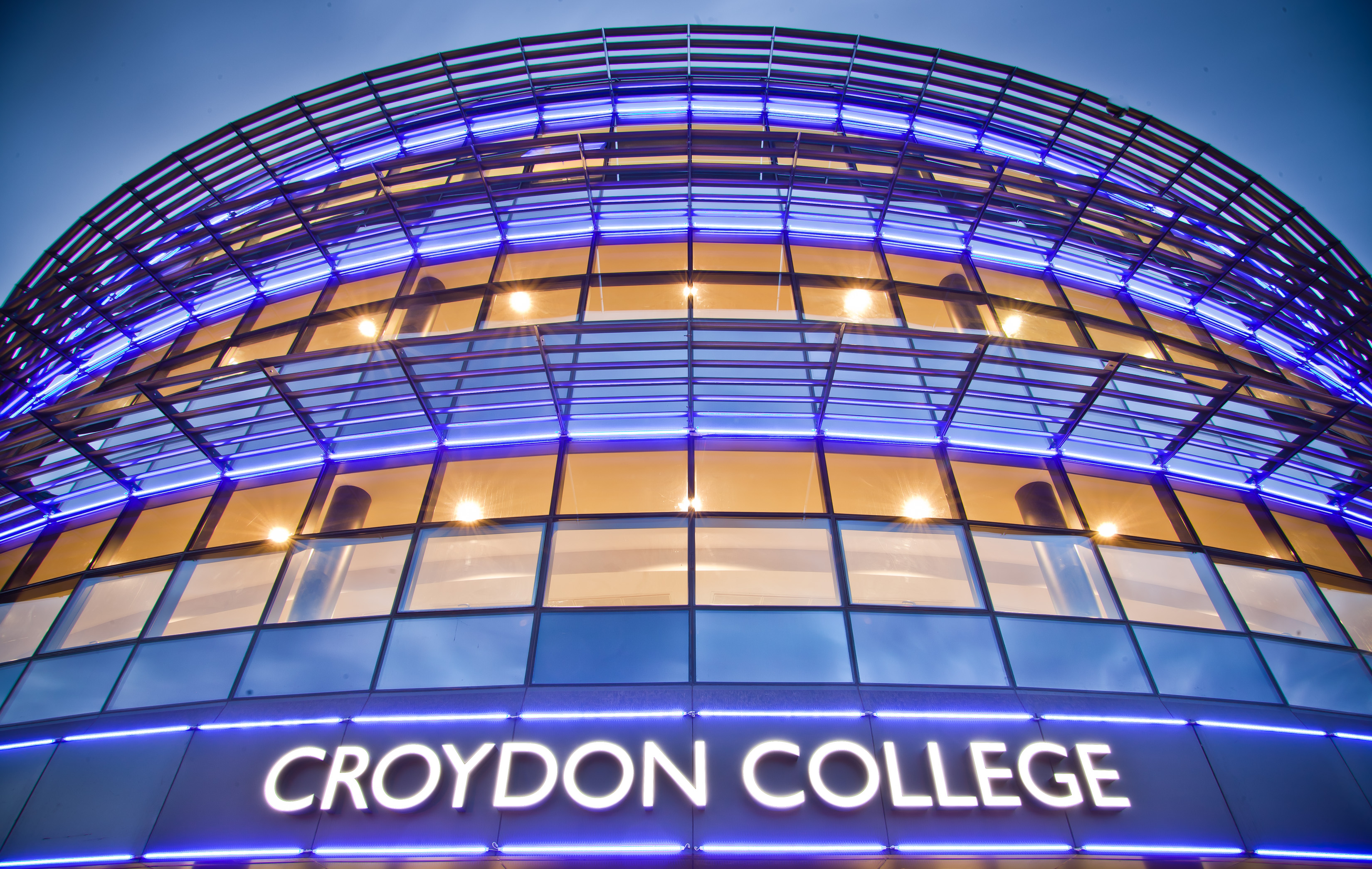

- Croydon College Group
- Dartington Hall Trust
- DCG (Derby College Group)
- DN Colleges Group (Doncaster College and University Campus North Lincolnshire)
- Doreen Bird College of Performing Arts
- Dudley College of Technology
- East Lancashire Learning Group
- East Surrey College
- East Sussex College Group
- Edward James Foundation
- EKC Group (East Kent Colleges)
- Elim Foursquare Gospel Alliance
- EM Normandie UK
- Emmanuel Theological College
- European School of Economics – ESE Insight
- Exeter and North Devon Colleges Group
- Fairfield School of Business
- Farnborough College of Technology
- Film Education Training Trust
- Futureworks Training
- Gloucestershire College
- Grantham College
- Harlow College
- Harrow, Richmond & Uxbridge College
- Havant and South Downs College
- Heart of Worcestershire College
- Heart of Yorkshire Education Group
- Hereford College of Arts
- Herefordshire, Ludlow and North Shropshire College
- Higher Rhythm
- Holy Cross College
- Hugh Baird College
- HY Education
- Inchbald School of Design
- Institute of Art - London
- Institute of Ismaili Studies
- International Business College Manchester
- INTO University Partnerships
- Irshad Trust
- Istituto Marangoni
- JSA Education Group (JCA London Fashion Academy)
- Kaplan Higher Education UK
- Kendal College
- The King's Foundation School of Traditional Arts
- Kirklees College
- Laine Theatre Arts
- Lakes College West Cumbria
- Le Cordon Bleu
- Leeds College of Building
- Leeds Conservatoire
- Leicester College
- Lincoln College
- London Bridge Business Academy
- London Churchill College
- London Contemporary Dance School
- London Film School
- London School of Jewish Studies
- London School of Academics
- London School of Commerce & IT
- London School of Management Education
- London School of Science & Technology
- London School of Theology
- London Studio Centre
- Loughborough College
- Luther King House Educational Trust
- Markfield Institute of Higher Education
- Matrix College of Counselling and Psychotherapy
- Met Film School
- Metanoia Institute
- Mid-Kent College
- Middlesbrough College
- The Minster Centre
- MLA College (Marine Learning Alliance)
- Moorlands College
- Morley College
- Moulton College
- Mountview Academy of Theatre Arts
- Myerscough College
- National Centre for Circus Arts
- Nazarene Theological College
- Nelson College London
- New City College
- New College Swindon
- Newbold College
- Newbury College
- Newcastle and Stafford Colleges Group
- North East Surrey College of Technology
- North Hertfordshire College
- North Kent College
- North Warwickshire and South Leicestershire College
- Northampton College
- Northern College of Acupuncture
- Nottingham College
- Oaklands College
- Oldham College
- Paris Dauphine International
- Peter Symonds College
- Plumpton College
- Preston College
- Queen's Foundation for Ecumenical Theological Education
- Raindance Educational Services
- Rambert School of Ballet and Contemporary Dance
- Reaseheath College
- Results Consortium
- Riverside College Halton
- RNN Group
- Royal Academy of Dance
- Royal Academy of Dramatic Art
- RTC Education (Regent College London)
- Salford City College
- Salvation Army Trust
- Sheffield College
- Sherwood Psychotherapy Training Institute
- Shrewsbury College
- Solihull College and University Centre
- South & City College Birmingham
- South Essex College of Further and Higher Education

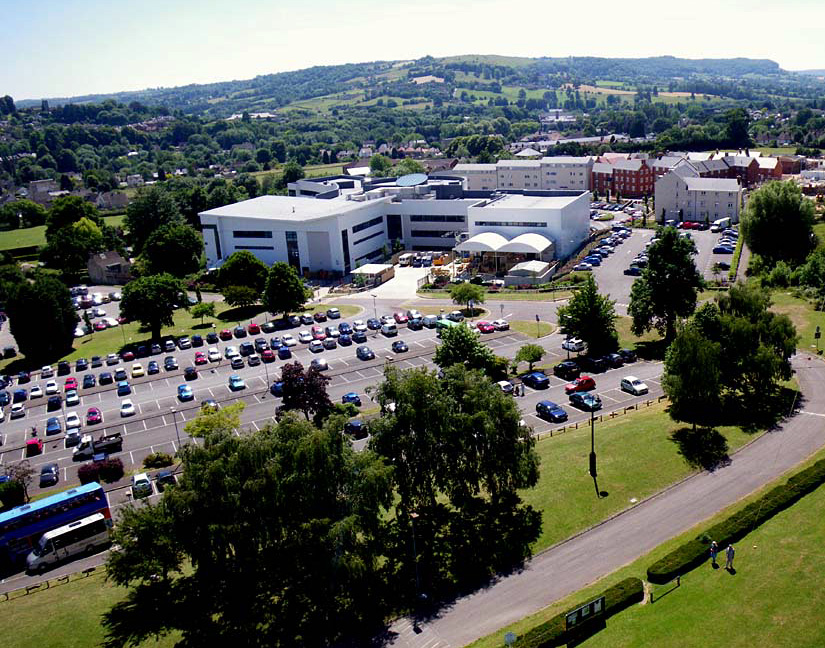
South Gloucestershire and Stroud College

- South Gloucestershire and Stroud College
- South Hampshire College Group
- South Thames Colleges Group
- Sparsholt College
- St Helens College
- St Mellitus College Trust
- Stratford College London
- Study Group
- Sysco Business Skills Academy
- Tameside College
- Telford College
- ThinkSpace Education
- Trafford and Stockport College Group
- Trinity College (Bristol)
- Truro and Penwith College
- Tyne Coast College
- UCK (The London College)
- Unified Seevic Palmer’s College
- United Colleges Group
- University Centre Peterborough
- University Centre Quayside
- University Centre Somerset College Group
- Walsall College
- Warrington & Vale Royal College
- Waverley Abbey Trust
- West Herts College
- West Thames College
- Westminster Theological Centre
- Weston College of Further and Higher Education
- Weymouth and Kingston Maurward College
- Wigan and Leigh College
- Wiltshire College and University Centre
- Windsor Forest Colleges Group
- Wirral Metropolitan College
- Yeovil College
- York College

=== Other colleges ===
- Asanté Academy of Chinese Medicine
- Birmingham Christian College
- Brighton Institute of Modern Music
- Bristol Old Vic Theatre School in Bristol
- British College of Osteopathic Medicine
- British Institute of Technology, England
- Chaucer College
- City College Brighton & Hove
- College of the Resurrection, Mirfield
- Crawley College
- Duchy College, Stoke Climsland and Rosewarne, Penzance
- English National Ballet School
- European School of Osteopathy
- Global Banking School
- Grimsby Institute of Further & Higher Education
- Hertford Regional College
- Isle of Wight College
- Leeds Professional College
- London Academy of Management Sciences
- London School of Business and Finance
- London South East Colleges
- Mont Rose College, London
- Northbrook College
- Northern School of Contemporary Dance, Chapeltown, West Yorkshire
- Redcar & Cleveland College
- SAE Institute
- Selby College
- Sotheby's Institute of Art
- South West College
- Southern Regional College
- Stockport College
- University Campus Doncaster
- Wakefield College
- Waltham International College
- Westminster Kingsway College

== Northern Ireland ==
- Belfast Metropolitan College

== Scotland ==
- Glasgow School of Art
- City of Glasgow College

== Wales ==
- Coleg Llandrillo Cymru
- Coleg y Cymoedd
- Gower College Swansea

== Defunct institutions ==
Notable higher education colleges that no longer exist due to closure, mergers, de-mergers etc. (but not institutions that have merely changed their name) include:

- Academy of Live and Recorded Arts, London and Wigan
- Bedford College of Higher Education, Bedford
- Bell College, Hamilton and Dumfries
- Bretton Hall College, Wakefield
- Bulmershe College of Higher Education (BCHE), Reading
- Crewe and Alsager College of Higher Education
- Dartington College of Arts
- Garnett College, London
- Grafton College, London
- Hereford College of Education, Hereford
- Holborn College
- Kent Institute of Art & Design, Canterbury, Maidstone and Rochester
- National Heart and Lung Institute
- Northern School of Music, Manchester
- Peninsula College of Medicine and Dentistry, split into two separate medical schools
- Royal College of Science, London
- Royal Manchester College of Music
- La Sainte Union College of Higher Education, Southampton

== See also ==
- List of universities in the United Kingdom
