= Lev Pidlisetskyi =

Ukrainian politician (1977–2021)

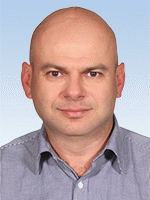

People's Deputy of Ukraine

8th convocation
- In office 27 November 2014 – 29 August 2019

Personal details
- Born: 29 May 1977 Lviv, Ukrainian SSR
- Died: 10 August 2021 (aged 44) Lviv, Ukraine
- Party: Samopomich Union
- Children: 3
- Education: Lviv Polytechnic University
- Occupation: Politician, entrepreneur

Lev Teofilovych Pidlisetskyi (Ukrainian: Лев Теофілович Підлісецький; 29 May 1977 – 10 August 2021) was a Ukrainian politician and entrepreneur. He was a Member of Ukrainian Parliament of the 8th convocation, member of parliamentary faction Samopomich Union. Pidlisetskyi did not return to parliament following the 2019 Ukrainian parliamentary election.

== Biography ==
Pidlisetskyi was born in Lviv, in the family of Teofil Myronovych, famous Lviv doctor and Ansia Markiyanivna, professor at Lviv Polytechnic University. He attended Lviv Physics and Mathematics Lycée, which he graduated from in 1994. In 1999, he graduated from Lviv Polytechnic University with Specialist Degree in Finance. While at university, he took part in the Ukrainian Finance Olympiad. In 1997, he enrolled at the faculty of International Studies and Law at the University of Coventry (the UK).

In 2001, he was appointed to the post of Director for Economy and Finance at Halenerhobudprom, a metal-production company in Stryi, Lviv Oblast. In May 2003, he was appointed CEO of Halenerhobudprom and in 2006, he was appointed CEO of Pivdenzahidelectromerezhbud.

In 2009, he started excursion programs around Lviv with Chudo-trains (trackless trains). Afterwards, he founded the travel agency 'Chudo tour' and became the president of the Lviv Tourist Alliance in 2013.

Pidlisetskyi was married and had three daughters. Pidlisetskyi died aged 44 in Lviv on 10 August 2021. According to Lviv Mayor Andriy Sadovyi Pidlisetskyi died due to a serious illness.
