= List of universities and colleges in Northern Ireland =

Universities, university colleges and colleges in Northern Ireland include:

== Universities ==
- Queen's University Belfast
  - St Mary's University College (teacher training)
  - Stranmillis University College (teacher training)
- Ulster University
  - Belfast Campus
  - Coleraine Campus
  - Jordanstown Campus
  - Magee Campus (Magee College)
- Open University

== Further and higher education colleges ==
- Belfast Metropolitan College (53,000 students at 3 campuses within Belfast - Titanic Quarter, Castlereagh and Millfield)
- North West Regional College (24,000 students at 3 campuses - Derry, Limavady, Strabane)
- Northern Regional College (35,000 students at 7 campuses - Antrim, Ballymena, Ballymoney, Coleraine, Larne, Magherafelt, Newtownabbey)
- South Eastern Regional College (30,000 students at 6 campuses - Ballynahinch, Bangor, Downpatrick, Lisburn, Newcastle, Newtownards)
- South West College (18,500 students at 4 campuses - Enniskillen, Dungannon, Omagh and Cookstown)
- Southern Regional College (50,000 students at 6 campuses - Armagh, Banbridge, Kilkeel, Lurgan, Newry, Portadown)

== Other colleges ==
- College of Agriculture, Food and Rural Enterprise has three campuses at Greenmount, Enniskillen and Loughry
- Belfast School of Theology
- Edgehill Theological College, the training institution for the Methodist Church in Ireland
- Irish Baptist College
- Union Theological College, the training institution for the Presbyterian Church in Ireland, which also allows the wider public to study theology at undergraduate and postgraduate level
- Whitefield College of the Bible, Banbridge is an independent theological college operated by the Free Presbyterian Church of Ulster

== Defunct institutions ==
This is a list of defunct institutions due to closure or merger and not because they have been renamed.

- New University of Ulster (1968–1984)
- Ulster Polytechnic (1971–1984)
- St. Joseph's Training College (1961 - 1985)
- Magee University College (1865–1968)

== See also ==
- Armorial of UK universities
- Education in Northern Ireland
- List of universities in the United Kingdom
- List of colleges in the United Kingdom offering higher education courses
- The Open University
