= Coventry Business School =

Business school in England

Coordinates: 52.4066°N 1.5009°W

- Type: Business school
- Established: 1990
- Location: Coventry, United Kingdom
- Website: www.coventry.ac.uk/study-at-coventry/faculties-and-schools/coventry-business-school/

Coventry Business School is a business school located in Coventry, United Kingdom. It is a department of Coventry University and its Faculty of Business and Law. The School offers undergraduate and postgraduate degrees in subjects such as economics, marketing, event management and applied management.

The School is an accredited study centre of the Chartered Institute of Marketing and is a member of the Association of Business Schools.

== History ==
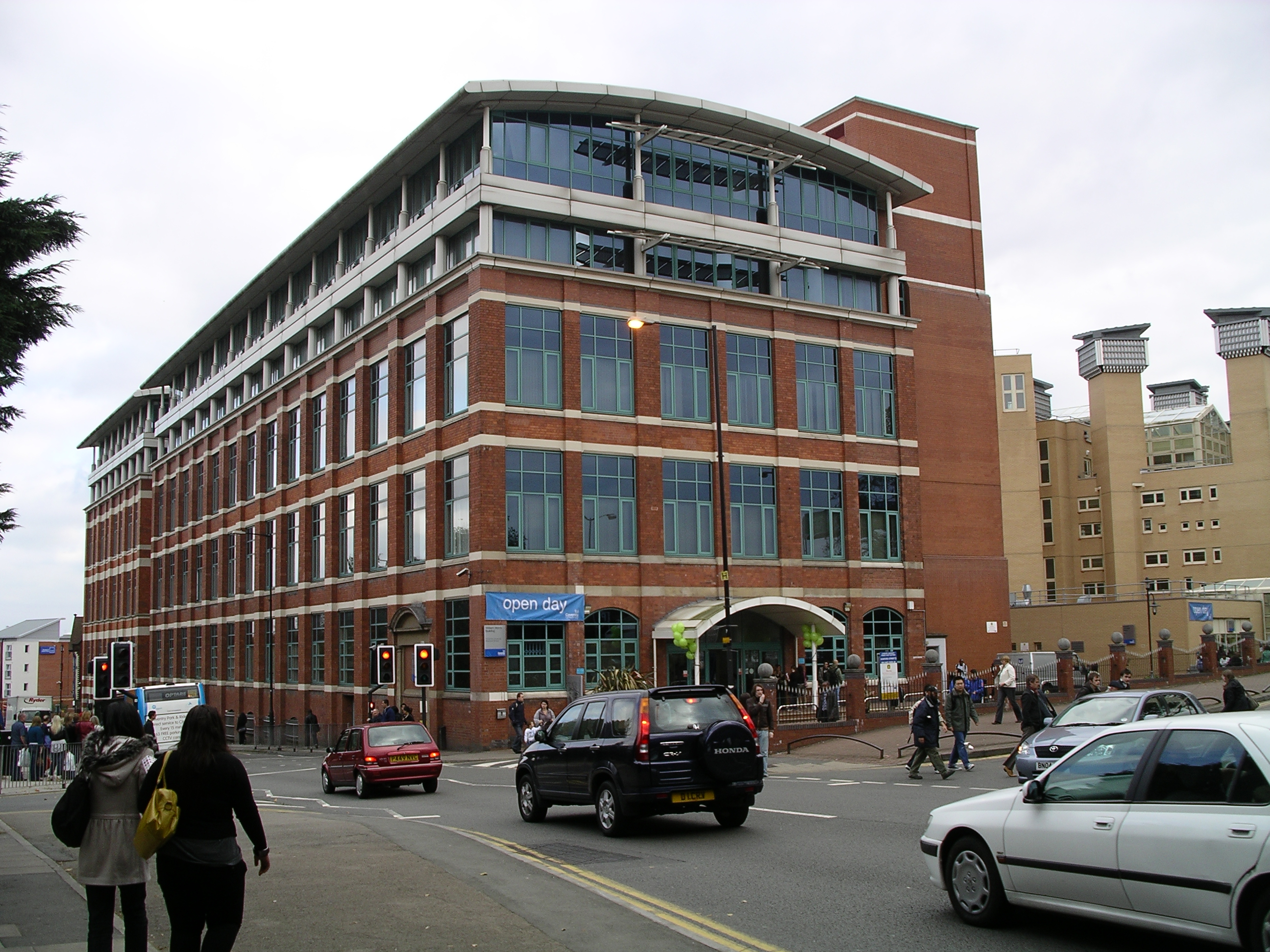
The William Morris Building, where Coventry Business School is based.

A Faculty of Business was formed in 1987 by the then Lanchester Polytechnic and the Business School was established in 1990, by when the parent body was known as Coventry Polytechnic. The polytechnic became Coventry University in 1992.

The School's home, the William Morris building, dates from 1916. Car entrepreneur William Morris bought it in 1923 to produce car engines. Acquired by the university in 1992, the building has been extensively renovated and now includes IT labs, lecture theatres, specialist post-graduate teaching facilities and also houses the biggest academic trading floor in Europe.

== Structure ==
Coventry Business School incorporates the following:

- School of Economics, Finance and Accounting
- School of Strategy and Leadership
- School of Marketing and Management

== Academic profile ==
The School offers undergraduate, postgraduate and research programmes, including MBAs in a variety of different subjects. Of note was the launch at The House of Commons in 2015 of The National MBA in Cyber Security (now branded as an MBA for the Cyber Security Management sector, the first degree of its kind and also the first to be supported by a Prime Minister and Leader of HM Opposition). The MBA was the brainchild of Professor Richard Benham who is a visiting professor at the university.

The School is a member of EFMD (European Foundation of Management Development) and of the Association of UK Business Schools. The School has partnerships with many overseas universities, including Oulu (Finland); Beijing and Guangzhou in China; ESC Clermont, ESC Montpellier and ESC St Etienne in France; and Kraków University of Economics in Poland.

=== Rankings ===
The School was ranked as "Excellent" in the 2015 Eduniversal ranking of business schools with 3 palmes. Coventry Business School was ranked 20th best by the Guardian university guide 2015 and among top 33 best Business Schools by 2012 Sunday Times Good University Guide.

=== Accreditation ===
The Coventry Business school is accredited by the Chartered Institute of Marketing and has received EPAS accreditation for its Business Management programmes. The school is also a member of the Association for Events Management Education (AEME) and which helps to provide the opportunity to undertake overseas field trips.

=== Research ===
The School is home to the Centre for Business in Society (CIBS), directed by Professor Lyndon Simkin. CIBS carries out applied research, training, consultancy and networking outputs across the cores themes of sustainability, ethical consumption and economic development. The centre hosted the 2009 Play the Game International Conference 'Visions for Sports in time of crisis'. In 2010 CIBS launched the journal Sport, Business and Management: an International Journal published by Emerald.

== Notable alumni ==
Notable alumni of the School include: Gary Kibble, retail trading director, Shop Direct Group; and Gideon Coe, the radio DJ.
