= Derwent Living =

Housing association in England

Derwent Housing Association Ltd
- Trade name: Derwent Living
- Company type: Private limited company
- Founded: 1964
- Revenue: £58 million (2021-2022)
- Number of employees: 316 (2021-2022)
- Subsidiaries: Derwent Community Housing Association Limited; Centro Place Investments Limited; Centro Place Management Limited; Derwent Facilities Management Limited
- Website: No website

Derwent Living is the trading name of Derwent Housing Association Limited, an not-for-profit provider of affordable housing in the Midlands, Yorkshire and the South East of England.

== History ==
Derwent Living was founded in 1964, and became a registered society in 1967.

== Activities ==
Derwent Living is one of the largest housing associations in the Midlands, responsible for around 15,000 properties. The estate agent Savills put Derwent Living in a list of the top 11 providers of purpose built student housing, of which only three were housing associations.

== Subsidiaries ==
As of 2023, Derwent Livings has 4 subsidiaries:

- Derwent Community Housing Association Limited
- Centro Place Investments Limited
- Centro Place Management Limited
- Derwent Facilities Management Limited

Its former subsidiaries include:

- Uliving, a joint venture between Bouygues Development and Derwent Living. Bouygues Development is the UK property arm of international services group Bouygues.

== See also ==
- Housing association
