= Asanté Academy of Chinese Medicine =

Coordinates: 51.5787°N 0.1492°W

- Highgate, London; United Kingdom

Information
- Type: Chinese Medical School
- Motto: Providing Acupuncture and Chinese Medicine in London - Timeless Wisdom for a Modern World
- Established: 2000
- Principal: Dr Song Ke
- Website: http://www.asante-academy.com/

Asanté Academy of Chinese Medicine is a medical college in Highgate, London in the Borough of Haringey, London, England.

Founded in 2000, the Academy offers training in many branches of traditional Chinese medicine (TCM), including tui na massage, acupuncture, Chinese herbology, tai chi and qigong. Working in concert with a treatment centre at the same site, the Academy offers a variety of courses, including a 4-year degree programme in Traditional Chinese Medicine, which is validated by Middlesex University. This 4-year course of studies was the first ever to be jointly run and validated by Peking University and a university in Europe. As of September 2009, there were over 150 students enrolled on this course.
