= CU London =

Coordinates: 51.5603°N 0.15615°E

CU London is a Higher Education Institute (HEI) owned and governed by Coventry University Group. CU London began offering courses to students in September 2017. It currently operates out of two sites, one in the former Dagenham Civic Centre in the London Borough of Barking and Dagenham and another in the Mitre Passage building in the Greenwich Peninsula. It includes Coventry University Group's second and third campuses in the capital alongside Coventry University London.

== Subjects ==
CU London Dagenham campus offers a range of degree, HTQ, degree with foundation year courses and top-up to Level 6 courses. Subjects offered by CU London include.

- Applied Biosciences
- Applied Psychology
- Business Management and Leadership
- Cloud Computing
- Computing Science
- Cyber Security
- Electro-Mechanical Engineering
- Health and Social Care
- Law and Practice
- Primary Education and Teaching Studies
- Professional Accounting
- Public Health and Community Studies
