= Birmingham Business School (University of Birmingham) =

Public business school in Birmingham, England

Coordinates: 52.4495°N 1.9253°W

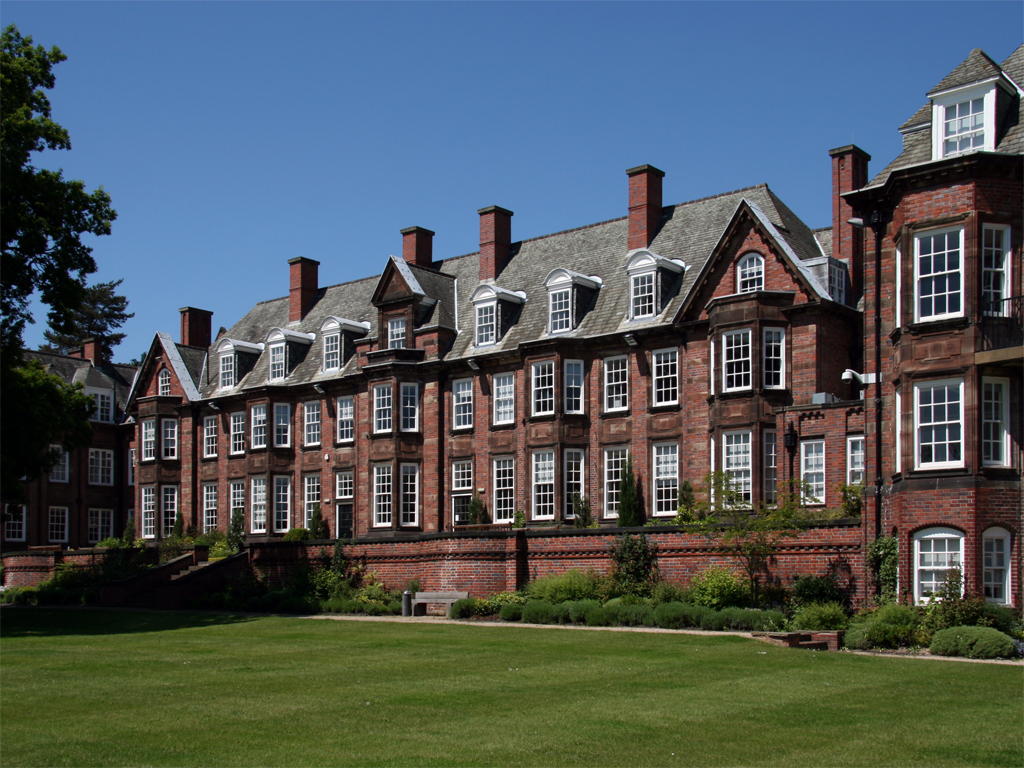
- Type: Business School
- Established: 1902 (School of Commerce); 1989 (Business School)
- Affiliations: University of Birmingham
- Dean: Professor Edgar Meyer
- Location: Birmingham, England
- Campus: Suburban
- Website: www.birmingham.ac.uk/business

Birmingham Business School (BBS) is the business school of the University of Birmingham in England. Established in 1989, the school traces its history back to the School of Commerce founded in 1902, leading to it sometimes being identified as the oldest business school in the United Kingdom. Edgar Meyer was announced new dean in June 2023.

== History ==
Sir William Ashley

In 1901, Sir William Ashley took the first Chair of Commerce at the school, where he fostered the development of its commercial programme. From 1902 until 1923 he served as the first Professor of Commerce and dean of the faculty, which he was instrumental in founding.

Ashley said that the aim of the new faculty was the education not of the "rank and file, but of the officers of the industrial and commercial army: of those who, as principals, directors, managers, secretaries, heads of department, etc., will ultimately guide the business activity of the country".

In its first year, the annual costs of the faculty, including staff salaries, were £8,200. There were six students, a lecture room and two classrooms. By 1908, fifteen men had graduated from the school.

However, the teaching of the time was not grounded in academic research and lacked a theoretical basis, damaging the reputation of Birmingham and other schools of commerce. With a drop of in demand from industry for commerce graduates in the 1930s, professors were not replaced and staff burdens grew to the extent that it fuelled opposition to business and management teaching at other universities, including Oxford and Cambridge. By the late 1940s, the teaching in schools of commerce such as Birmingham was mainly economics. Alexander Carr-Saunders, the director of the London School of Economics, referred to the Birmingham Bachelor of Commerce as "an economics degree in all but name".

After World War 2, there was a push to establish business schools in the UK along the general lines of those in the US, but it was not until the Franks Report of 1963 that the government committed funding to opening two business schools, in Manchester and London. This led to the establishment of business schools and MBA courses not only at these two schools but also in places such as Durham, Warwick and Strathclyde; these 1960s schools are often regarded as the first business schools in the UK. However, it was not until 1985 that Birmingham revived its business education and opened an MBA course. Birmingham Business School was formed in 1989 by the merger of the Department of Commerce and the Department of Accounting and Finance.

In March 2005, University House was officially opened by Sir Dominic Cadbury as the Business School's new £20m home. In 2008, the school expanded to add the Department of Economics to its list of departments that already included Accounting and Finance; Management; Marketing.

A brand new £10m postgraduate teaching centre, the Alan Walters Building officially opened in December 2016.

== Academic profile ==
=== Research ===
The 2008 Research Assessment Exercise, in which Birmingham Business School was submitted under the Business and Management Studies sub-panel, 90% of research activity submitted by the school was rated as being of international standing.

At the core of all of the school's research is responsible business and how research can help society; the school has a number of research centres focusing on a range of topics to contribute to this:

==== Lloyd's Banking Group Centre for Responsible Business ====
The interdisciplinary centre, formed in July 2017, is the result of a unique partnership of Birmingham Business School academics, the University of Birmingham Business Engagement team and Lloyds Banking Group.

==== City Region Economic and Development Institute (City REDI) ====
City REDI was established by the University of Birmingham with over £4 million of investment to support regional economic growth policy and practice through engaged and relevant research. The centre is a research institute focused on developing an academic understanding of major city regions across the globe to develop practical policy which better informs and influences regional and national economic growth policies. Alongside this, the centre is focused on ensuring that the growth of cities is sustainable and beneficial for all. City REDI is involved in the Inclusive Growth Unit, led by the West Midlands Combined Authority.

==== Centre for Business Strategy and Performance ====
The Centre for Business Strategy and Performance (CBSP) was established in 1993.

==== Centre for Crime, Justice and Policing ====
The Centre brings together a diverse group of over 40 researchers who focus on the areas of crime, justice and policing.

==== Accountability and Governance Research Cluster ====
The Accountability and Governance Research Cluster has three core themes in accountability and governance; tax, public sector and policing. The Centre for Tax Governance examines issues of tax governance from the perspective of social, political, legal and organisational theory. The Public Sector theme focuses on the analysis of the objectives, practices and outcomes of accountability and governance in the context of the Public Sphere. Policing examines accountability with respect to the governance of policing.

=== Reputation and rankings ===
The Birmingham MBA has been consistently ranked in the major MBA league tables and it was once ranked the UK's top full-time MBA programme in the Economist Intelligence Unit's 2004 global MBA ranking.

Year	The Financial Times Global MBA ranking	The Economist Full-time MBA ranking
2016	92nd	Yet to be published
2015	95th	89th
2014	Unranked	93rd
2013	Unranked	85th
2012	86th	84th
2011	68th	70th
2010	75th	68th
2009	83rd	67th

== Notable people ==
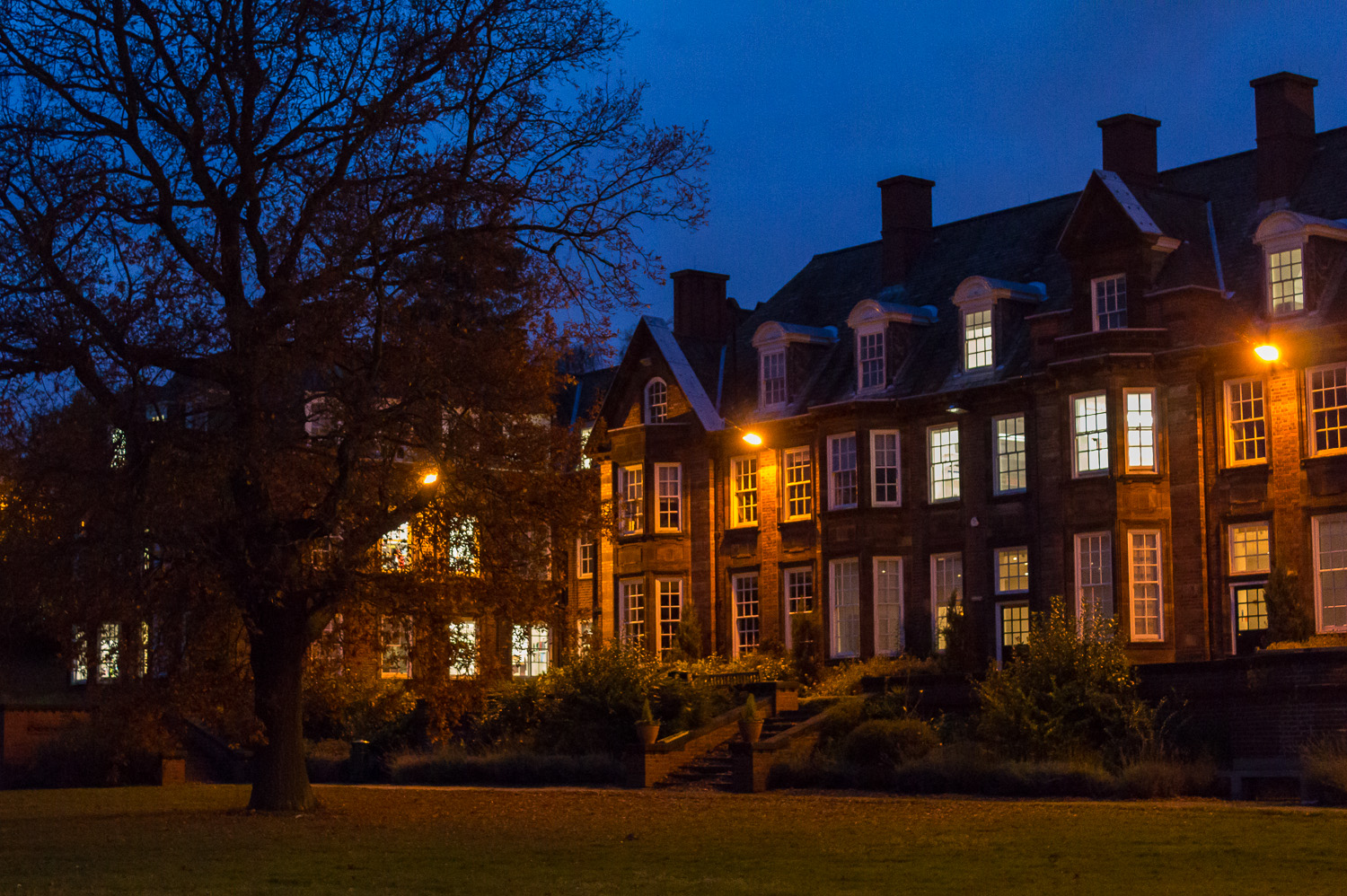
Birmingham Business School at night

=== Notable alumni ===
This list includes alumni both of the business school and of the university's earlier courses in commerce and business administration.

- David Gill - Chief Executive, Manchester United
- Tuhin Kanta Pandey, chairman of the Securities and Exchange Board of India
- Jim Reid-Anderson - President and Chair of Six Flag
- Simon Mantell - Full-time England field hockey player
- James Rodwell - Full-time England rugby sevens player

=== Deans ===
The current Dean of Birmingham Business School is Edgar Meyer, who joined in 2023. Previous Heads of School have included:

- David Bailey
- Jonathan Michie
