= Coventry University =

Public university in England

- Coventry University Coat of Arms
- Former names: Coventry Polytechnic (1987–1992); Lanchester Polytechnic (1970–1987)
- Motto: Latin: Arte et Industria
- Motto in English: By Art and Industry
- Type: Public
- Established: 1992 – Coventry University (gained university status); 1970 – Lanchester Polytechnic
- Affiliations: Association of Commonwealth Universities; University Alliance; Universities UK; EUA
- Endowment: £1.06 million (2025)
- Budget: £362.8 million (2024/25)
- Chancellor: Eng Ahmed El Sewedy
- Vice-Chancellor: John Latham
- Faculty: 1,890
- Students: 29,505 (2024/25)
- Undergraduates: 19,700 (2024/25)
- Postgraduates: 9,805 (2024/25)
- Location: Coventry, England
- Campus: Urban
- Colours: Coventry Blue
- Website: www.coventry.ac.uk
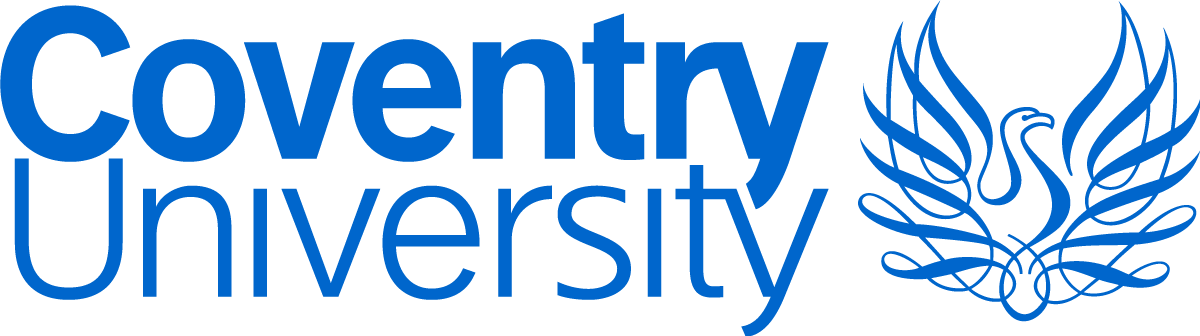

Coventry University is a public research university in Coventry, England. The origins of Coventry University can be linked to the Coventry School of Design in 1843. It was known as Lanchester Polytechnic from 1970 until 1987, and then as Coventry Polytechnic until it gained university status in 1992.

Coventry is the larger of the two universities in the city, the other being the University of Warwick. The Coventry University Group operates campuses in Coventry, Scarborough, London and Wrocław. It has two principal campuses: one in the centre of Coventry where the majority of its operations are located, and one in Central London which focuses on business and management courses. Coventry also governs the higher education institutions CU Coventry, CU Scarborough and CU London. Its colleges, which are made up of schools and departments, run around 300 undergraduate and postgraduate courses. Across the university there are 11 research centres which specialise in different fields, from agroecology and peace studies to future of transport.

The annual income of the institution for 2024–25 was £362.8 million of which £15.5 million was from research grants and contracts, with an expenditure of £437.3 million. The university holds an overall Gold rating in the 2023 Teaching Excellence Framework. Coventry is a member of the University Alliance mission group.

== History ==
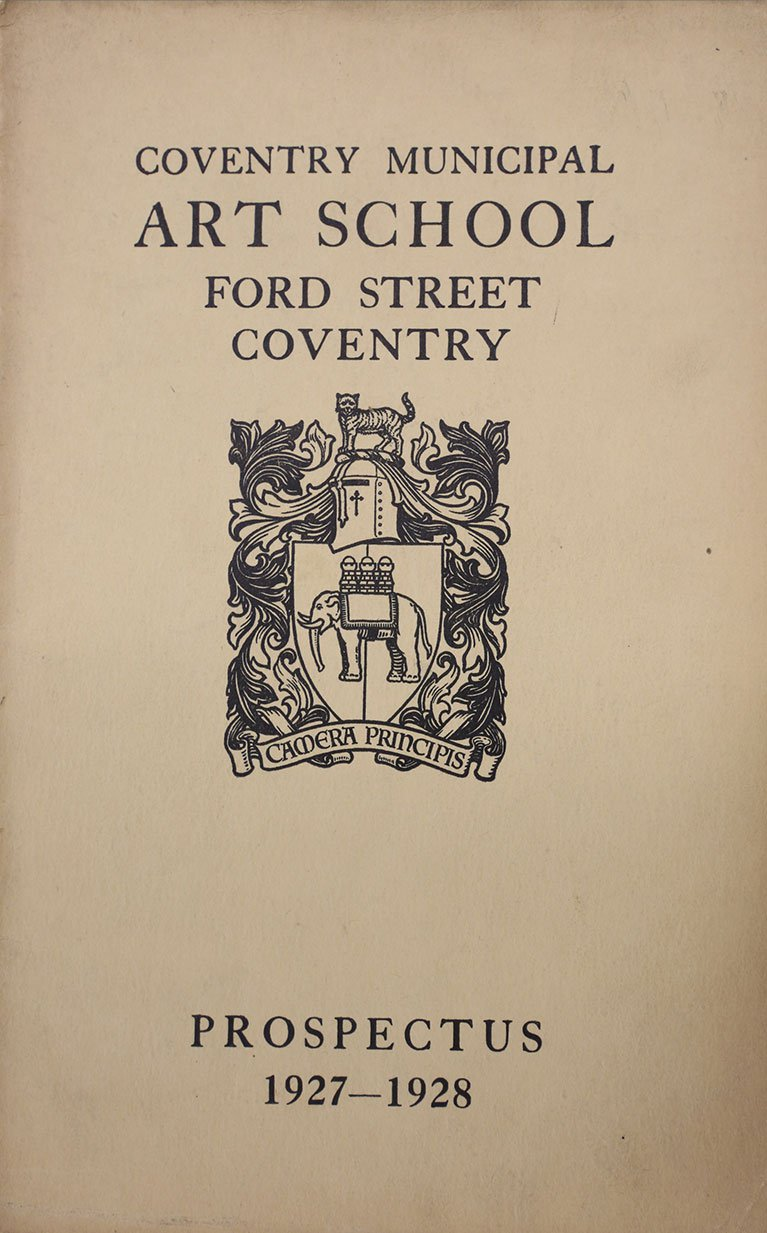
Coventry Municipal Art School Prospectus for the academic year 1927–1928

The origins of Coventry University can be traced back to the founding of the Coventry School of Design in 1843. Later renamed the Coventry School of Art, it was again renamed in the early 20th century to the Municipal Art School as part of the Education Act 1902. One final name change took place in the 1950s, when it became known as the College of Art.

In the late 1950s, to address the need for a high level of technical training which the existing Coventry Technical College (now City College Coventry) could not meet, the construction of a new institution began. Opened in 1961, it was called the Lanchester College of Technology, named after the car engineer Frederick Lanchester.

In 1970, the Lanchester College of Technology and the College of Art, along with the Rugby College of Engineering Technology in the neighbouring town of Rugby, amalgamated to form Lanchester Polytechnic. The institution was designated as such in February 1971 by then Education Secretary Margaret Thatcher. The name Lanchester gave the institution a certain degree of obscurity (it was often confused with both Lancaster and Manchester), notably when none of the contestants on the BBC Radio 4 general knowledge show Brain of Britain could give its correct location. The polytechnic cancelled its graduation ceremony in 1974 following the Birmingham pub bombings in fear that public gatherings could be targeted; the ceremony was eventually held in 2009, 35 years later. Lanchester Polytechnic was renamed "Coventry Polytechnic" in 1987, and when the Further and Higher Education Act 1992 afforded Coventry Polytechnic university status that year, the name was changed to Coventry University.

In 2010, a campus in London was established to further attract international students to the university. In 2012 "Coventry University College" was set up within the main university campus, offering qualifications up to degree-level at a lower cost compared to typical university fees.

As of 2017 Coventry is the highest-ranked modern university in the UK in both the Guardian University Guide – in which it ranks 12th overall – and the Complete University Guide. It also places in the top 200 in the Times Higher Education Young University Rankings 2017, which ranks universities around the world that are aged 50 years or under.

In July 2017, the university announced Margaret Casely-Hayford as its new chancellor, replacing Sir John Egan.

The campus in Coventry is undergoing a £430 million investment programme for the period up to 2022, with a new £37 million science and health building and £73 million student accommodation complex – opened in 2017 and 2018 respectively – central to the development scheme.

In September 2019, Coventry purchased the 22-acre farm Ryton Organic Gardens from the charity Garden Organic, who remains on site as a tenant along with the Heritage Seed Library and a Community Supported Agriculture (CSA) scheme '5-Acre CSA' sitting alongside the university's own Centre for Agroecology, Water and Resilience.

== Campuses ==
=== Coventry campus ===
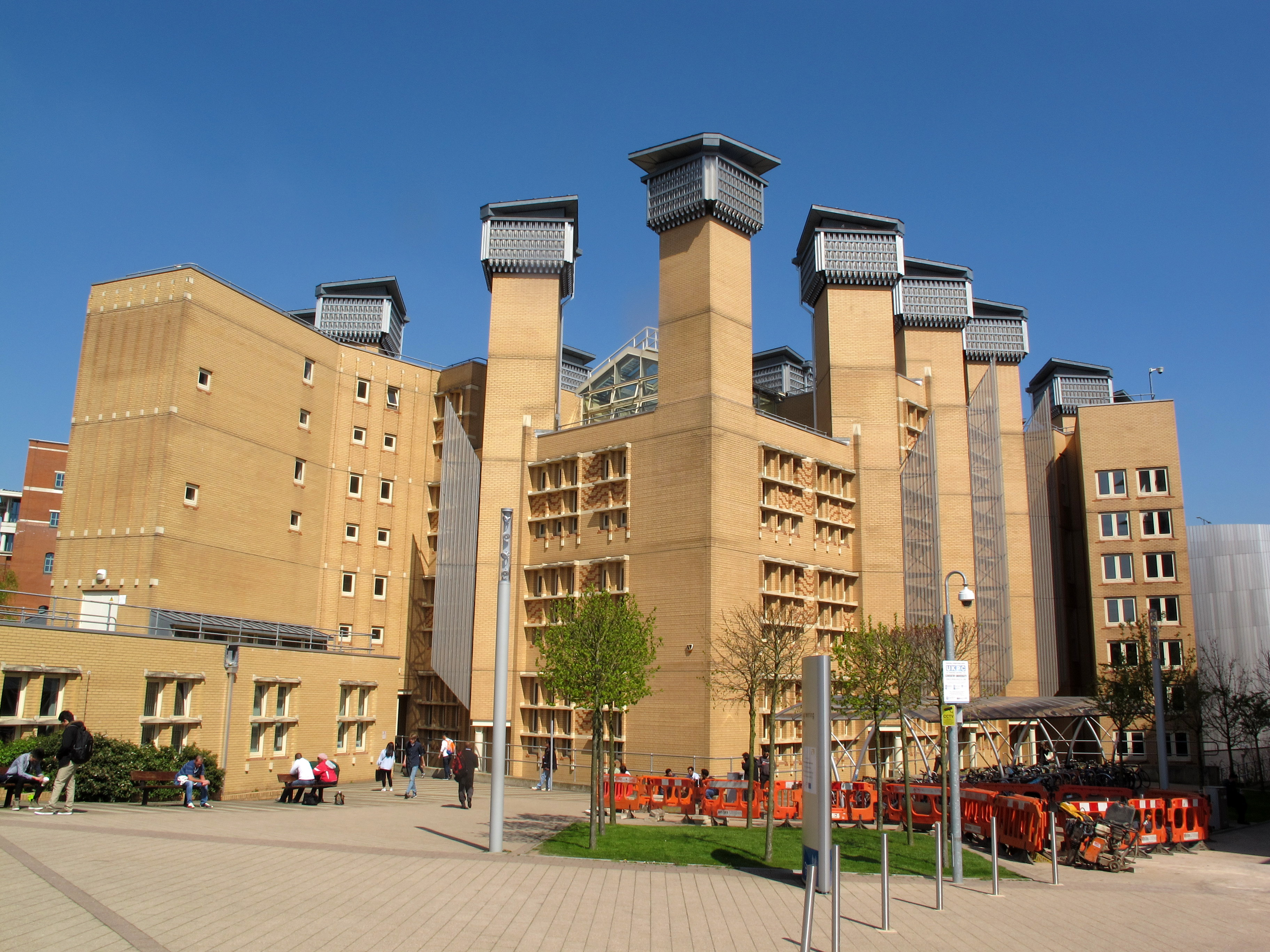
The Frederick Lanchester Building, the university library (also known as the "Lanchester Library")

Coventry currently occupies a purpose-built 33-acre (13 ha) campus in Coventry City Centre adjacent to Coventry Cathedral and the Herbert Art Gallery and Museum. It occupies a mix of new purpose-built buildings, converted structures, and those inherited from its predecessor institutions.

The centrepiece of the campus is The Hub which opened in August 2011. The Hub is the home of the Coventry University Students’ Union, student support services, a bar/nightclub, a food hall and food outlets which are catered by Sodexo In September 2012, a new £55 million engineering building was opened, with facilities such as a full-scale Harrier jump jet, a wind tunnel and flight simulators. The Hub was awarded a BREEAM 'excellent' rating and between them The Hub and the engineering building feature sustainable initiatives such as grey-water harvesting, a biomass boiler and a green roof. The opening of the buildings marks the first stage of a £160 million redevelopment plan of the campus phased over 15 years.

Coventry's £20 million library opened in 2000 and is on the outskirts of the campus. It was officially opened by Princess Anne in September 2001 and contains over 2,000 print periodicals, 350,000 monographs, and more than 6,000 video tapes, audio tapes and films. The library has a distinctive turreted exterior and has won awards for its interior design which features a light distribution system to make the most of natural light throughout the building.

There are two converted buildings on the campus. A former car engine factory built in 1910 located next to the university's library now houses the Coventry Business School, and a cinema built in 1880 on Jordan Well is currently home to the School of Media and Performing Arts, now part of the College of Arts and Society, and formerly part of the Coventry School of Art and Design.

To the south of the main campus is the 20-acre (8.1 ha) Coventry University Technology Park, a business park owned by Coventry University Enterprises Limited, a commercial subsidiary of the university, and through which several of the university's commercial subsidiary operations provide business services to local and national organisations. Tenants of the park are small businesses which receive support from the university and are allowed access to the university's library. The park is also home to conference facilities at the TechnoCentre building, the Coventry and Warwickshire New Technology Institute, which works with companies to address skills shortages in ICT and advanced technology, and a digital lab for serious game and other technology development.

Coventry has adopted a policy of naming its buildings after people or organisations with a significant local or regional impact. These include former Coventry-based automotive company Armstrong Siddeley; Shakespearean actress Ellen Terry; Coventry-based automotive pioneer Frederick Lanchester; Victorian novelist, critic and poet George Eliot; the father of the bicycle industry James Starley (building demolished in early 2020); former MP for Coventry East and political journalist Richard Crossman; artist Graham Sutherland, whose building was later demolished and replaced by a new building named after composer Delia Derbyshire, who is best known for composing the theme song to the BBC series Doctor Who; and founder of the Morris Motors automotive manufacturer William Morris.

The College of Engineering, Environment & Science has a former RAF Harrier T.4 aircraft, tail number XW270, used as a teaching aid.

==== Gallery ====
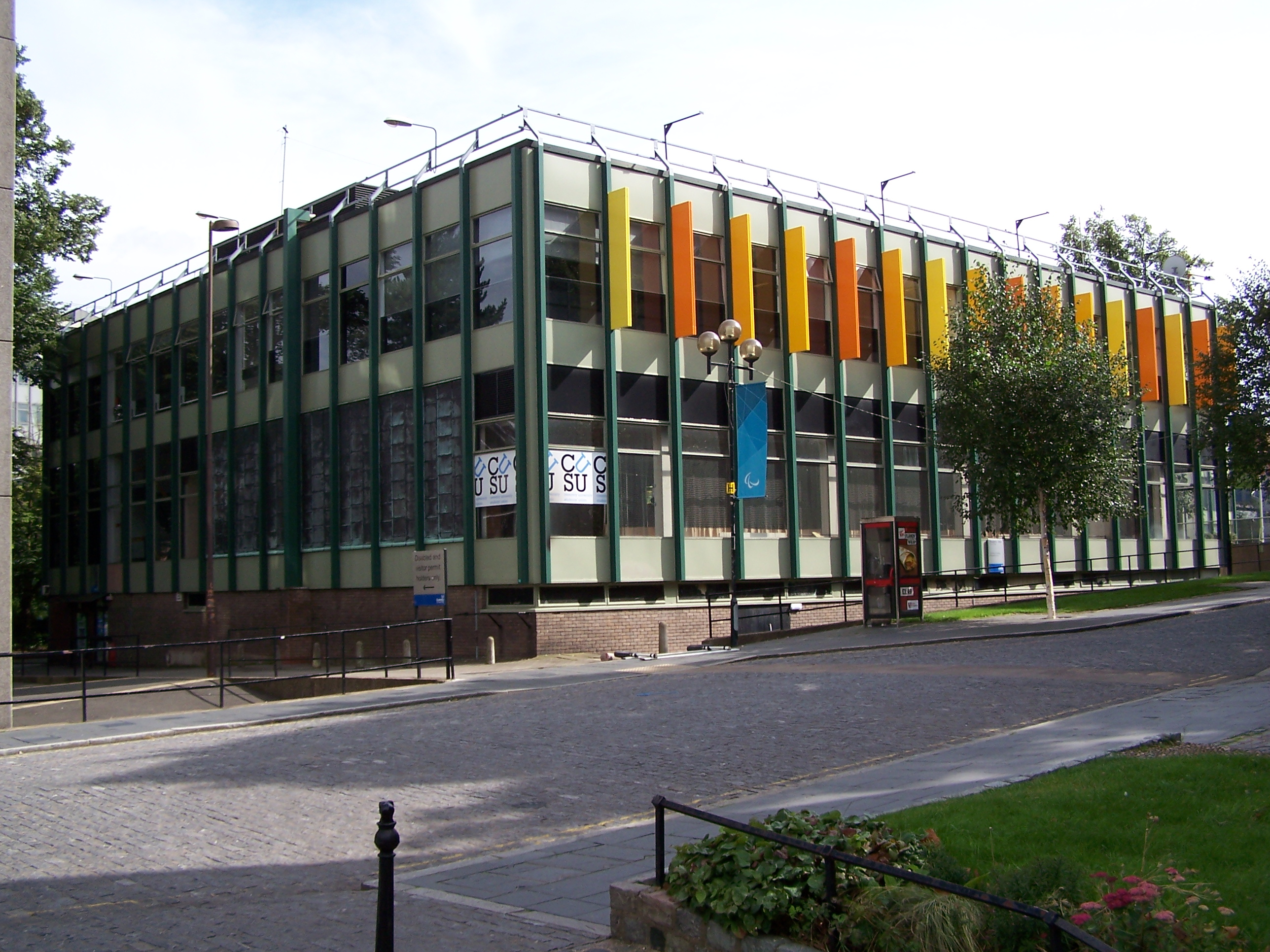
The Priory Building, used for pre-courses

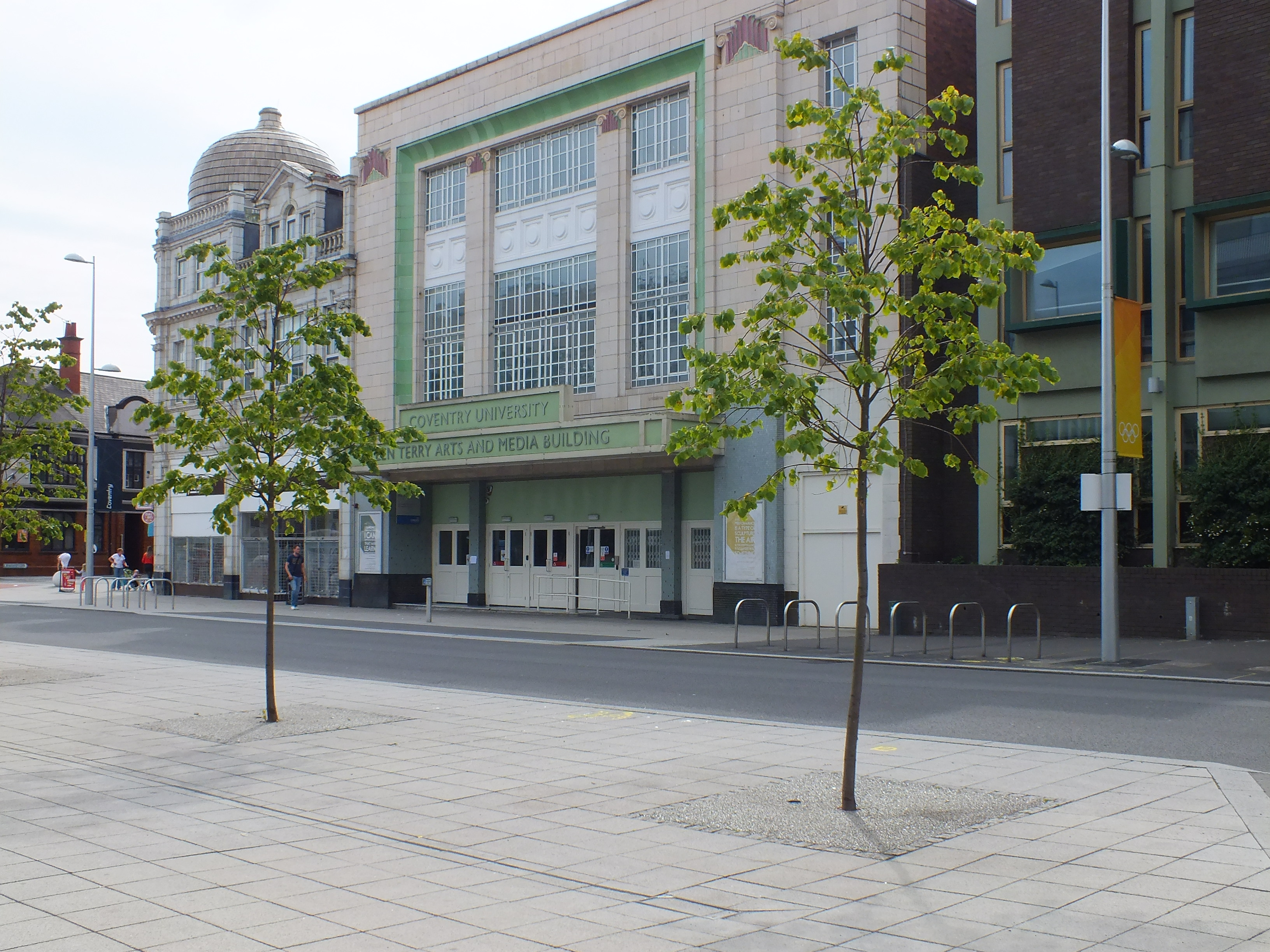
The Ellen Terry building is a former 20th century cinema that was refurbished in 2000.

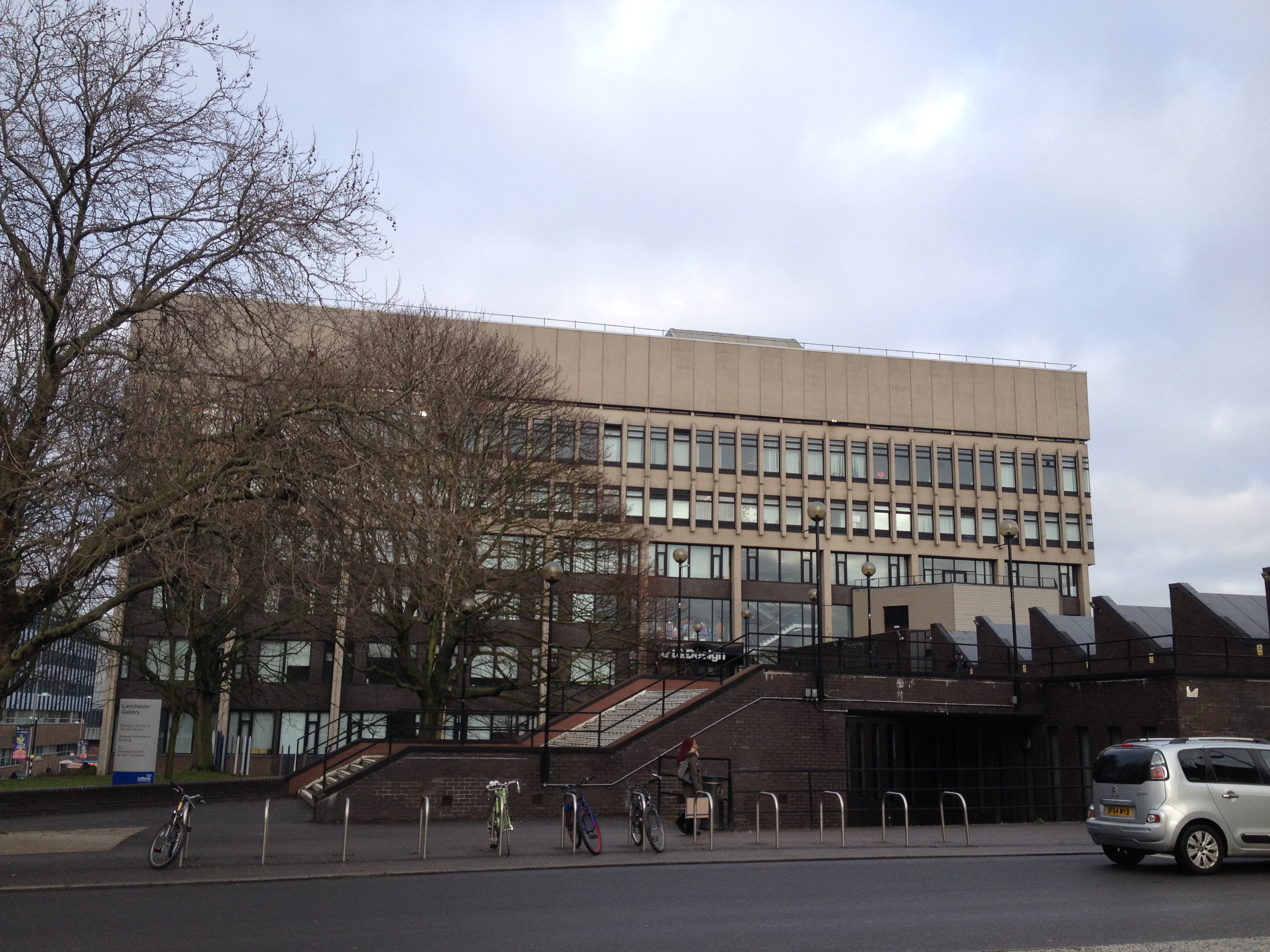
The Graham Sutherland building was the main building for the Art and Design faculty. It has since been demolished and replaced with the Delia Derbyshire building.

=== CU Coventry ===
CU Coventry campus openedon Mile Lane, Coventry in 2012.

=== CU London ===
CU London Dagenham was established as a new campus in 2017 located in the former Dagenham Civic Centre.

CU London Greenwich opened in 2020 and operates from a new campus at 6 Mitre Passage, on the Greenwich Peninsula.

=== CU Scarborough ===
CU Scarborough located in North Yorkshire opened in 2016.

=== Coventry University London ===
Coventry University's London campus was opened in 2010. The campus is located in University House, 109–117 Middlesex Street in the City of London.

=== Coventry University Wrocław ===
Coventry University Wrocław campus opened in September 2020, offering courses taught in English. It is the first foreign university in Poland.

== Structure and organisation ==
=== Governance ===
Coventry University is headed formally by the Chancellor, a largely ceremonial role, currently Eng Ahmed El Sewedy. The Chancellor is supported by six Pro-Chancellors and is appointed by the university's Board of Governors. Terms for the Chancellor and Pro-Chancellors are five years in length; the number of terms a Chancellor can serve is unrestricted while Pro-Chancellors are limited to two. The university is led on a day-to-day basis by the Vice-Chancellor, who is supported by four Deputy Vice-Chancellors and three Pro Vice-Chancellors. The position of Vice-Chancellor has been occupied, currently, by John Latham since March 2014.

Coventry is a member of the University Alliance mission group, of which Latham is a former chair.

=== Colleges and schools ===
Coventry is divided into three colleges, each divided into different schools, and 1 independent school. In 2023, Coventry University de-established the Faculty of Health and Life Sciences, whilst reorganising the remaining 3 faculties into Colleges

College of the Arts and Society

- Coventry School of Art and Design
- School of Media and Performing Arts
- School of Social Sciences and Humanities (formerly the School of Humanities and the School of Psychological, Social and Behavioural Sciences)

College of Business and Law

- Coventry Business School
- Coventry Law School

College of Engineering, Environment and Science

- Civil Engineering, Architecture and Building
- Geography, Environment and Disaster Management
- Mathematics and Physics
- Mechanical, Automotive and Manufacturing Engineering
- Aerospace, Electrical and Electronic Engineering
- School of Sciences (formerly the School of Computing and the School of Life Sciences)

School of Health and Care

The School of Health, formerly part of the Faculty of Health and Life Sciences, was renamed, and sits outside of the college structure.

- Allied Health Professionals
- Nursing, Midwifery and Health

=== Finances ===
In the financial year ended 31 July 2013, Coventry University had a total income of £220.43 million and a total expenditure of £199.71 million. Key sources of income included £136.53 million from tuition fees and contracts, £45.18 million from funding body grants, £8.82 million in research grants and contracts, £1.96 million from investment and endowment income, and £27.92 million from other income.

Coventry University is an exempt charity under the Charities Act 1960. Commercial activities are undertaken by six subsidiaries wholly owned by the university. These subsidiaries are together known as the Coventry University Group, and deliver education, business support, partnership and consultancy, and serious game development to local and national organisations.

== Academic profile ==
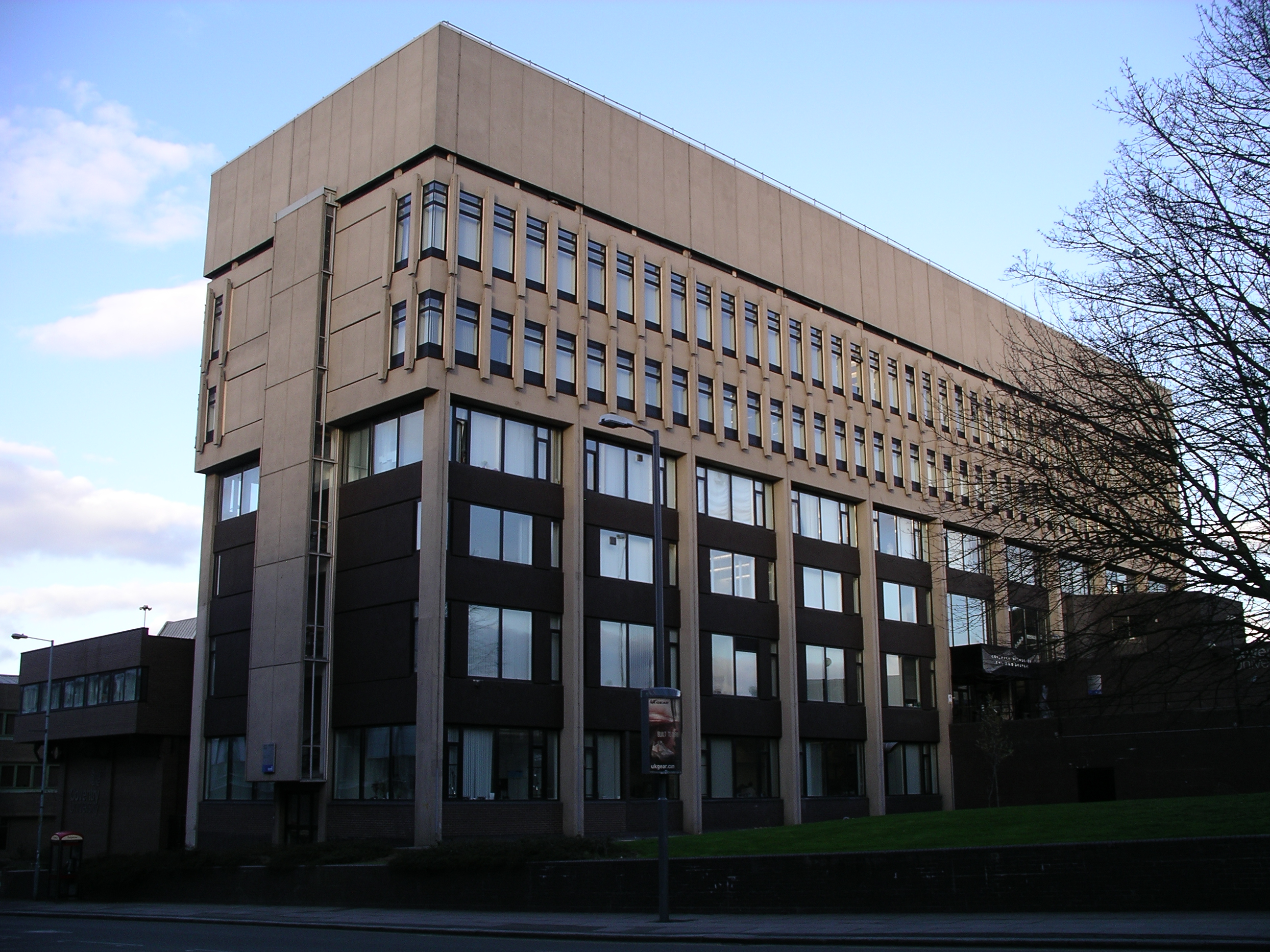
The Graham Sutherland building was built in 1959 and was used by the university's School of Art and Design. It has been replaced with the Delia Derbyshire building.

Coventry offers more than 130 undergraduate degrees and 100 postgraduate degrees over its four faculties, as well as qualifications such as foundation degrees and Higher National Diplomas (HNDs). It has introduced the teaching of disaster management at undergraduate level (the first such course in the UK) as well as parapsychology and health journalism at the postgraduate level.

The university's student body in 2024/25 consisted of 38,430 students: 31,645 undergraduates and 6,785 postgraduates. Part-time students in 2013–14 made up 15% of undergraduates and 39% of postgraduates. The drop-out rate for first year undergraduates is 8.9% and the undergraduate intake from state schools is 97%. The university employs over 1,800 academic staff and is the fourth largest employer in Coventry.

Tuition fees for undergraduate students at the university are variable and range from £7,500 to £9,000 depending on the degree programme, following the United Kingdom government's decision in 2010 to raise the maximum limit universities can charge UK and EU students. The university cited the variable fee structure in explaining the rise in applications received for 2012 compared to the previous year, despite an overall national fall.

=== Research ===
The Research Assessment Exercise 2008 classed that research conducted by the university in the subjects ‘Allied Health Professions and Studies’, ‘Computer Science and Informatics’, ‘Electrical and Electronic Engineering’, ‘Library and Information Management’, ‘Politics and International Studies’, ‘Social Work and Social Policy & Administration’, and ‘Art and Design’ contained elements of 'world-leading' research.

=== Rankings ===
Rankings
National rankings
- Complete (2027): 57
- Guardian (2027): 96
- Times / Sunday Times (2027): 71

Global rankings
- ARWU (2026): 901–1000
- QS (2027): 581=
- THE (2026): 601–800

Nationally, Coventry is ranked 38th by The Guardian University league tables 2023, 44th by The Times and Sunday Times University Guide 2023 and 53rd by The Complete University Guide 2023. Internationally, Coventry is ranked within the top 601–650 universities in the world by the 2020 QS World University Rankings.

Subject strengths in The Complete University Guide 2020 rankings include Food Science (7th), Hospitality, Leisure, Recreation and Tourism (13th) and Drama, Dance and Cinematics (20th).

The Guardian 2015 rankings include Architecture (16th), Building and Town and Country Planning (7th), Design & Crafts (15th), Drama & Dance (19th), Mechanical Engineering (19th), Film Production and Photography (1st), Hospitality, Event Management and Tourism (5th), Mathematics (19th), Media & Film Studies (12th), Nursing and Midwifery (9th) and Social Work (10th). In 2023, Guardian ranks its International Relations (7th) overall best in the UK.

A 2008 RAE ranking of UK Psychology programs ranked Coventry 73rd, which is near the bottom of all UK universities, and a 2014 REF study ranked the overall quality of Coventry's Psychology, Psychiatry, and Neuroscience programs 45th out of 82 UK universities, placing it in the bottom half.

The People & Planet Green League 2013, a UK ranking based on environmental and ethical performance, placed Coventry 43rd, gaining a 'First Class' rating. According to the 2013 National Student Survey, 90% of Coventry University students were satisfied with their course.

In 2017, the university gained a Gold in the Government's Teaching Excellence Framework and maintained the rating in 2023.

=== Awards ===
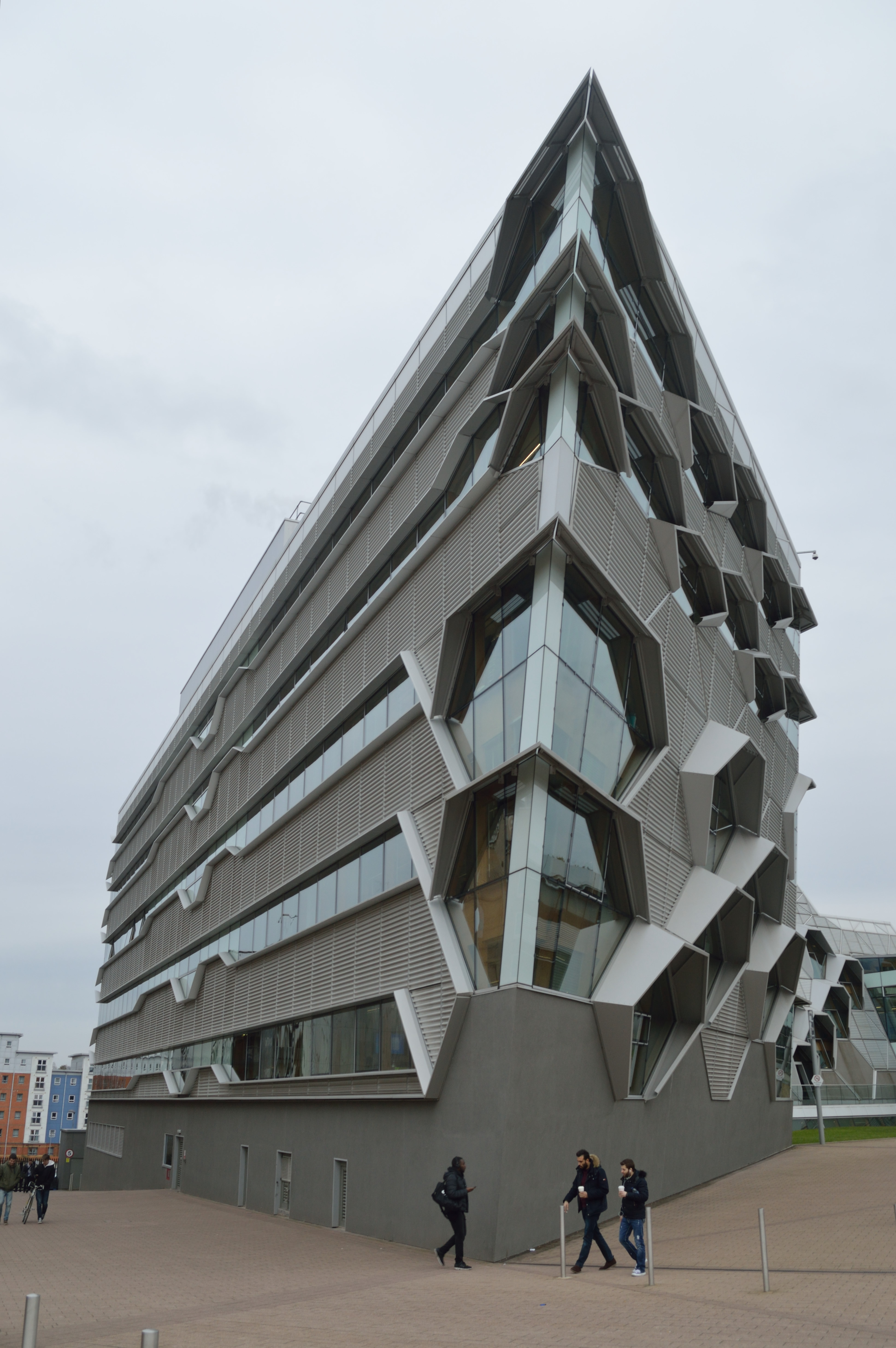
An aspect of the Engineering and Computing Building, officially opened by Princess Anne in February 2013

Coventry University's Department of Industrial Design won the Queen's Anniversary Prize for Higher and Further Education in the 'Engineering and Technology' category for "[e]ducating tomorrow’s world leaders in automotive design" in 2007. In 2020, Coventry's Institute of Advanced Manufacturing and Engineering, a partnership with Unipart Manufacturing Group, received the same award.

Coventry University's BA Acting Stage and Screen/Theatre and Professional Practice Degree has been the recipient of several international awards for its Immersive Telepresence in Theatre/Shakespeare Remote project conducted in conjunction with the Theatre Arts Degree at Tampere University and L'Escola Superior d'Art Dramàtic de les Illes Balears (ESADIB). The project, which enables student performers to rehearse and perform remotely using telepresence technologies won Gold in the Arts and Humanities category at the 2016 Reimagine Education Awards and won double Golds in the Arts and Humanities and Hybrid Learning Categories at the 2018/19 Reimagine Education Awards. It was also highly commended at the 2018 Times Higher Education Awards. The project has conducted several collaborations with Adam Mickiewicz University in Poznan, Purdue University in the US and a live motion-capture performance between New World Symphony in Miami and Tampere in Finland. In March 2018, the project was invited to Hong Kong as part of the GREAT Festival of innovation organised by the UK's Department of Trade as one of the key examples of innovative education practices in the United Kingdom. In November 2020 the project was awarded the Guardian University Award for Internationalisation. In 2025 the degree programme in partnership with L'Escola Superior d'Art Dramàtic de les Illes Balears, Spain, won the PIEoneer Award for Study Abroad and Exchange Experience of the Year for their 'Romeo and Juliet Online' project.

Coventry was named 'Entrepreneurial University of the Year' in the Times Higher Education Awards 2011.

The university is one of only a select few higher education institutions in the history of the Queen's Awards to be honoured. In the awards' 50th anniversary year, Coventry University has been commended in the International Trade category in recognition of its 'continuous achievement' since 2009.

== Student life ==
The university holds an annual public degree show which exhibits conceptual designs and performances by final year undergraduate students of the Coventry School of Art and Design.

=== Accommodation ===
Accommodation for students is provided by the university and by private companies. Coventry owns four facilities for undergraduate students: Bishop Gate, Godiva Place, Singer Hall and Cycle Works as well as several houses around Coventry, mostly in the Earlsdon area. It also manages four facilities: Apollo House, Lynden House, Radford Road, Parish Rooms and Pillar Box, the latter being exclusively for postgraduate students.

Facilities provided through partnerships Coventry has with private companies, such as Unite, Liberty Living and Derwent Living, include Liberty Park (shared with the University of Warwick), Trinity Point, Paradise Place, Sherbourne House, Callice Court and Raglan House. New accommodation facilities shared with the University of Warwick down the city's Trinity Street and Market Way opened in autumn 2010, with two more along Corporation Street and Greyfriars Lane opening the following year. Further plans to expand accommodation for Coventry students in the city centre was announced in April 2013 with the expected conversion of the former Hotel Leofric into student flats.

In total, the university's accommodation can provide for 3,579 students.

=== Students' Union ===
Coventry University Students' Union (CUSU) is a registered charity that acts as a representative and campaigning organisation for students at Coventry University. It is headquartered in The Hub and has a variety of membership services including supporting more than 100 sports clubs and societies, a free advice centre and a volunteering department. CUSU owns and runs an independent nightclub on Far Gosford Street which opened in November 2012 despite opposition from a rival nightclub.

Coventry University's sports team, Team Phoenix, represents the university in five sports. Coventry annually competes with the University of Warwick in a series of formal and informal varsity matches over a number of different sports. Coventry is an entrant in Formula Student through its Phoenix Racing team, finishing 42nd out of 102 entrants in 2012 and winning an award for the most fuel-efficient car in 2011.

Coventry's student radio station is Source Radio.

== Notable people ==
=== Principals (Polytechnic) ===
The head of the polytechnic was titled "Principal" and, later, "Director":

The university holds an annual public degree show which exhibits conceptual designs and performances by final year undergraduate students of the Coventry School of Art and Design.

- Alan Richmond (1970–1972)
- Keith Legg (1972–1975)
- Geoffrey Holroyde (later, Director; 1975–1987)
- Michael Goldstein (Director; 1987–1992)

=== Vice-Chancellors ===
- Michael Goldstein (1992–2004)
- Madeleine Atkins (2004–2013)
- John Latham (2013–)

=== Alumni ===
Notable students of Coventry University (and its previous incarnations Lanchester Polytechnic and Coventry Polytechnic) include:

- Neil Carson, CEO of Johnson Matthey plc
- Nick Buckles, CEO of security firm G4S
- Prince Abdulaziz bin Turki Al Saud, Saudi prince and investor
- Elizabeth Mojisola, Hunponu-Wusu, Brittish-Nigerian investment banker and entrepreneur
- Arran Summerhill, British entrepreneur and co-founder of Holo, a Dubai-based digital mortgage platform
- Sultan Al Jaber, UAE politician, President of COP28, CEO of ADNOC
- John Iley, Aerodynamicist
- David Yelland, writer and journalist
- Alex T. Smith, author and illustrator
- Christopher Townsend, visual effects supervisor, BAFTA and Academy Award for Best Visual Effects nominee
- Ian Callum, British car designer for Ford, TWR, and Aston Martin
- Steve Mattin, Chief designer of AvtoVAZ Lada, designer of Mercedes ML-Class and GL-Class E
- Angus Silver, neuroscientist
- Alison Snowden, British animator, director and Academy Award winner
- David Borrow, politician and MP for South Ribble (1997–2010)
- Bayo Alaba, British politician and Member of Parliament
- Elona Gjebrea, Albanian politician; Deputy Minister of the Interior
- Lev Pidlisetskyi, Ukrainian MP and politician
- Tobi Brown (TBJZL), YouTuber and co-founding member of the Sidemen
- Nira Chamberlain, mathematician and principal consultant at SNC-Lavalin
- Matthew Macklin, professional boxer
- Hannah Cockroft, British wheelchair racer and world record holder
- Horace Panter, musical artist
- Jessica Barry, super-featherweight boxer
- Andrea McLean, television presenter
- Louise Cook, British rally driver
- Pauline Black, singer, actress and author
- Adaora Onyechere, Nigerian TV/radio presenter, entrepreneur, motivational speaker and author
- John Kettley, meteorologist
- Shalom Razade, Indonesian actress
- Ralph Debbas, CEO of W Motors, designer of Lykan HyperSport
- Gideon Coe, presenter and journalist
- Jerry Dammers, musician
- Fanny Quenot, French hurdler
- Simon Hayhoe, educationalist and author
- Gerry McGovern, design director of Land Rover
- Spencer Kelly, presenter of the BBC's technology programme
- Kanika Tekriwal, CEO of JetsetGo
- Steve Knightley, musician and songwriter
- Nagendra Nagaraja, CEO of QpiAI and developer of QpiAI-Indus.

== See also ==
- Academics of Coventry University
- Armorial of UK universities
- Coventry University Business School
- List of UK universities
- Post-1992 universities
