= CU Scarborough =

Educational institution in Scarborough, England

CU Scarborough is a Higher Education Institute (HEI) governed by Coventry University Group. CU Scarborough launched in 2015 and currently operates in the North Yorkshire coastal town, Scarborough.

== Campus ==
The first cohort of students studied classes at The Spa, Scarborough, before moving into a £14 million purpose-built campus in Scarborough. Facilities include a mock law court, engineering and science labs, clinical skills lab, prayer room, library, cyber lab and IT suites.

CU Scarborough was built as part of the Scarborough £50 million education and sport campus, with the neighbouring Sports Village operated by Everyone Active, offering an Olympic Legacy swimming pool, a four-court sports hall, a multi-activity room, 60-station fitness suite and a community football stadium home to Scarborough Athletic F.C.

== Subjects ==
CU Scarborough currently offers a diverse range of subjects. Students can study degree programmes, HTQs and Degrees with Foundation Years.

Degree subjects include:

- Adult Nursing
- Applied Psychology
- Business Management & Leadership
- Community Coaching for England (HTQ)
- Computing Science
- Cyber Security
- Electro-Mechanical Engineering
- Health & Social Care
- Learning Disabilities Nursing
- Mental Health Nursing
- Primary Education & Teaching Studies
- Public Health & Community Studies
- Sports Performance Coaching

== Graduation ==
In 2018, students at CU Scarborough celebrated their first graduation ceremony at an event held in the Grand Hall, at Scarborough Spa. Sir Alan Ayckbourn, CBE, received an Honorary Doctor of Letters (Hon DLitt) in recognition of his impact on theatre in Scarborough and his contributions to the creative industries.

In September 2026 Yorkshire actor, writer and producer Gaynor Faye was awarded an honorary Master of Arts from CU Scarborough in recognition of her outstanding contribution to the entertainment industry and her role in championing Yorkshire on screen.

== Alumni ==
- Leon Cole, actor, comedian and filmmaker
