= Derwent =

Derwent may refer to:

== Places ==
=== Australia ===
- River Derwent (Tasmania)
- Derwent Valley Council, a local government area of Tasmania, covering the upper part of the River Derwent, from the major town of New Norfolk (just north-west of Hobart) to the remote south-west Hydro town of Strathgordon
- Electoral division of Derwent, Tasmania
- Derwent Barracks, an Australian Army barracks in the Hobart suburb of Glenorchy, near the Elwick Racecourse and Hobart Showgrounds

=== United Kingdom ===
- Derwent College, a college of the University of York
- Derwent, Derbyshire, a now-submerged village.
- Derwentwater, Lake District
- River Derwent, North East England
- River Derwent, Cumbria, a river in the Lake District of the county of Cumbria in the north of England
  - Above Derwent, a civil parish in the Cumberland district in Cumbria, England, bounded to the east by Derwent Water, the River Derwent and Bassenthwaite Lake, and includes sections of both lakes
- River Derwent, Derbyshire, a river in the county of Derbyshire, England, joining the River Trent south of Derby
- River Derwent, Yorkshire, a river in Yorkshire in the north of England
  - Sutton upon Derwent, a small village and civil parish on the River Derwent in the East Riding of Yorkshire, England, approximately 8 miles (13 km) to the south-east of York
  - Derwent Ings, a Site of Special Scientific Interest (SSSI) in the East Riding of Yorkshire, England
- Upper Derwent Valley, an area of the Peak District National Park in England
- Derwent Park (Rowlands Gill)
- Derwent Reservoir, North East England, a reservoir on the River Derwent, on the border between County Durham and Northumberland.
- Derwent Mouth, a location on the River Trent, which at that point forms the border between the English counties of Derbyshire and Leicestershire
- Derwent Rural District, a rural district in the East Riding of Yorkshire from 1935 to 1974
- Newton upon Derwent, a village and civil parish in the East Riding of Yorkshire, England
- Ouse and Derwent, a wapentake of the historic East Riding of Yorkshire, England consisting of the westerly part of the county

=== Canada ===
- Derwent, Alberta
- Derwent, Ontario

=== United States ===
- Derwent, Ohio

== Vehicles ==
- Derwent (locomotive), steam locomotive
- HMS Derwent, one of three warships of the Royal Navy
- HMAS Derwent, a naval base and a warship of the Royal Australian Navy
- SS Derwent, several ships

== Companies ==
- Derwent Cumberland Pencil Company, a manufacturer of pencils and other stationery
- Derwent London, commercial developer in London
- Derwent Capital Markets, hedge fund in London
- Derwent Drug File, formerly known as Ringdoc, an information monitoring, abstracting and documentation service
- Derwent Living, an provider of affordable and specialist housing in the Midlands, Yorkshire and the South East

== People ==
- Derwent Hall Caine (1891–1971), British actor, publisher and Labour politician
- Derwent Coleridge (1800–1883), third child of Samuel Taylor Coleridge, a distinguished English scholar and author
- Lavinia Derwent (1909–1989), MBE
- Derwent Lees (1884–1931), Australian artist and Slade School of Fine Art teacher
- Clarence Derwent (1884 – 1959) British actor, director, and manager. Founder of the Clarence Derwent Award in the USA.

== Other ==
- Rolls-Royce Derwent, jet engine
- Derwent (patent), patent indexing system
- Baron Derwent, of Hackness in the North Riding of the County of York, is a title in the Peerage of the United Kingdom
- Derwent flounder, Taratretis derwentensis, is a flatfish of the family Pleuronectidae
- Derwent Cricket Club, established in 1835 and is the oldest cricket club in Tasmania
- Derwent Park Road, a major link road in the northern suburbs of Hobart, Tasmania
- Derwent Way Bridge, a small road and rail swing bridge over the Annacis Channel of the Fraser River in the Lower Mainland of British Columbia, Canada
- Derwent House, on Camden Park Road, Chislehurst, Bromley
- Derwent Island House, an 18th-century Italianate house situated on Derwent Island, Derwent Water, Keswick, Cumbria, and in the ownership of the National Trust
- Derwent Power Station, a 214MWe gas-fired power station on Holme Lane near Spondon in Derby, England
- Derwent Tower, a 29-storey residential apartment building in Dunston, United Kingdom
- Derwent Reservoir (disambiguation)
- Derwent Valley (disambiguation)
- Derwent Valley Railway (disambiguation)
- Derwent World Patents Index
- River Derwent (disambiguation)

== See also ==
- Derventa, a municipality and its central town in Republika Srpska, Bosnia and Herzegovina
