= DVR =

DVR can refer to:

- Dalnevostochnaya Respublika, a nominally independent state that existed from April 1920 to November 1922 in the easternmost part of the Russian Far East
- Data validation and reconciliation
- Derwent Valley Railway (disambiguation)
- Devco Railway
- Differential Voting Right, a kind of equity share
- Digital video recorder
- Discrete valuation ring
- Discrete variable representation
- Distance-vector routing
- Direct volume rendering
- Dynamic voltage restoration
- DVR College of Engineering and Technology
- Van Riebeeck Decoration (DVR), a South African military award
