= Executive compensation in the United States =

Pay and benefits for upper management

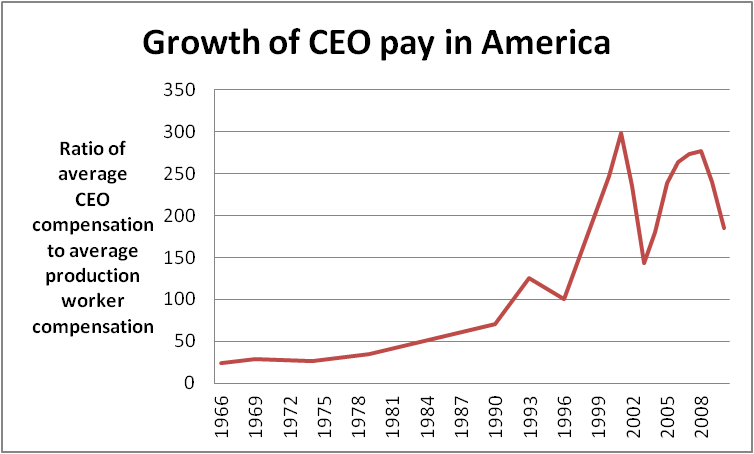
Ratio of the average compensation of CEOs from the top 350 firms and production workers, 1965–2009. Source: Economic Policy Institute. 2012. Based on data from Wall Street Journal/Mercer, Hay Group 2010.

In the United States, the compensation of company executives is distinguished by the forms it takes and its dramatic rise over the past three decades. Within the last 30 years, executive compensation or pay has risen dramatically beyond what can be explained by changes in firm size, performance, and industry classification. This has received a wide range of criticism.

The top CEO's compensation increased by 940.3% from 1978 to 2018 in the US. In 2018, the average CEO's compensation from the top 350 US firms was $17.2 million. The typical worker's annual compensation grew just 11.9% within the same period. It is the highest in the world in both absolute terms and relative to the median salary in the US.

It has been criticized not only as excessive but also for "rewarding failure"—including massive drops in stock price, and much of the national growth in income inequality. Observers differ as to how much of the rise and nature of this compensation is a natural result of competition for scarce business talent benefiting stockholder value, and how much is the work of manipulation and self-dealing by management unrelated to supply, demand, or reward for performance. Federal laws and Securities and Exchange Commission (SEC) regulations have been developed on compensation for top senior executives in the last few decades, including a $1 million limit on the tax deductibility of compensation not "performance-based", and a requirement to include the dollar value of compensation in a standardized form in annual public filings of the corporation.

While an executive may be any corporate "officer"—including the president, vice president, or other upper-level managers—in any company, the source of most comment and controversy is the pay of chief executive officers (CEOs) (and to a lesser extent the other top-five highest-paid executives) of large publicly traded firms.

Most of the private sector economy in the United States is made up of such firms where management and ownership are separate, and there are no controlling shareholders. This separation of those who run a company from those who directly benefit from its earnings, create what economists call a "principal–agent problem", where upper-management (the "agent") has different interests, and considerably more information to pursue those interests, than shareholders (the "principals"). This "problem" may interfere with the ideal of management pay set by "arm's length" negotiation between the executive attempting to get the best possible deal for him/her self, and the board of directors seeking a deal that best serves the shareholders, rewarding executive performance without costing too much. The compensation is typically a mixture of salary, bonuses, equity compensation (stock options, etc.), benefits, and perquisites (perks). It has often had surprising amounts of deferred compensation and pension payments, and unique features such as executive loans (now banned), and post-retirement benefits, and guaranteed consulting fees.

The compensation awarded to executives of publicly-traded companies differs from that awarded to executives of privately held companies. "The most basic differences between the two types of businesses include the lack of publicly traded stock as a compensation vehicle and the absence of public shareholders as stakeholders in private firms." The compensation of senior executives at publicly traded companies is also subject to certain regulatory requirements, such as public disclosures to the U.S. Securities and Exchange Commission.

== Levels of compensation ==
Since the 1990s, CEO compensation in the U.S. has outpaced corporate profits, economic growth and the average compensation of all workers. Between 1980 and 2004, Mutual Fund founder John Bogle estimates total CEO compensation grew 8.5 per cent/year compared to corporate profit growth of 2.9 per cent/year and per capita income growth of 3.1 per cent. By 2006 CEOs made 400 times more than average workers—a gap 20 times bigger than it was in 1965. As a general rule, the larger the corporation the larger the CEO compensation package.

The share of corporate income devoted to compensating the five highest-paid executives of (each) public firms more than doubled from 4.8 per cent in 1993–1995 to 10.3 per cent in 2001–2003. The pay for the five top-earning executives at each of the largest 1500 American companies for the ten years from 1994 to 2004 is estimated at $500 billion in 2005 dollars.

A study by the executive compensation analysis firm Equilar Inc. for The New York Times found that the median pay package for the top 200 chief executives at public companies with at least $1 billion in revenue in 2012 was $15.1 million—an increase of 16 per cent from 2011.

Lower-level executives also have fared well. About 40 per cent of the top 0.1 per cent income earners in the United States are executives, managers, or supervisors (and this doesn't include the finance industry)—far out of proportion to less than 5 per cent of the working population that management occupations make up.

== Highest-paid CEOs ==
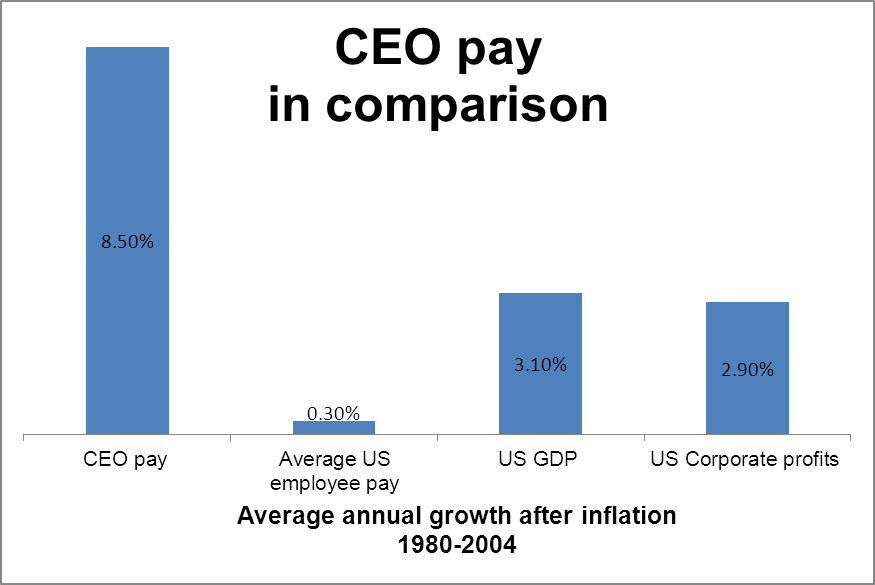
(Source: Reflections on CEO Compensation by John C. Bogle, Academy of Management, May 2008, p.21)

In 2012, the highest-paid CEO in the US was Larry Ellison of Oracle, with $96.2 million. That year the top 200 executives earned a total of $3 billion in compensation. The median cash compensation was $5.3 million, the median stock and option grants were $9 million.

In 2018, the highest-paid CEO in the US was Elon Musk of Tesla, Inc. Musk earned a total of $2.3 billion in compensation.

In 2020, The Wall Street Journal reported that the median pay for executives at 300 of the biggest U.S. companies reached $13.7 million, up from $12.8 million in 2019. The highest paid CEO out of companies on the S&P 500 in 2020 was Paycom CEO Chad Richison. For companies not on the S&P 500 list, Palantir Technologies CEO Alexander Carp and DoorDash CEO Tony Xu earned the most in 2020, with pay packages of $1.1 billion and $1 billion respectively.

An Associated Press and Equilar analysis of 337 S&P 500 chief executives found median 2025 compensation of $17.7 million, up 5.9 percent from 2024. The analysis included salary, bonuses, perks, stock awards and stock options.

== Types of compensation ==
The occupation of "executive" (a person having administrative or managerial authority in an organization) includes company presidents, chief executive officers (CEOs), chief financial officers (CFOs), vice presidents, occasionally directors, and other upper-level managers. Like other employees in modern US corporations, executives receive a variety of types of cash and non-cash payments or benefits provided in exchange for services—salary, bonuses, fringe benefits, severance payments, deferred payments, retirement benefits. But components of executive pay are more numerous and more complex than lower-level employees. Executives generally negotiate a customized employment contract with documentation spelling out the compensation, and taking into account government regulations and tax law. Some types of their pay (gratuitous payments, post-retirement consulting contracts), are unique to their occupation. Other types are not, but generally make up a higher (e.g. stock options) or lower (e.g. salary) proportion of their pay than that of their underlings.

One source sums up the components of executive pay as

- Base salary
- Incentive pay, with a short-term focus, usually in the form of a bonus
- Incentive pay, with a long-term focus, usually in some combination of stock awards, option awards, non-equity incentive plan compensation
- Enhanced benefits package that usually includes a Supplemental Executive Retirement Plan (SERP)
- Extra benefits and perquisites, such as cars and club memberships
- Deferred compensation earnings

Salary plus short-term bonuses are often called short-term incentives, and stock options and restricted shares long-term incentives.

Forbes magazine estimates that about half of Fortune 500 CEO compensation for 2003 was in cash pay and bonuses, and the other half in vested restricted stock and gains from exercised stock options. In the previous year (2002), it found salary and bonuses averaged $2 million.

=== Salary ===
Annual base salary in large publicly owned companies is commonly $1 million. Salary paid in excess of $1 million is not tax-deductible for a firm, though that has not stopped some companies from going over the limit. In the other direction, "some of the largest and most successful corporation" in the US—Google, Capital One Financial, Apple Computer, Pixar—paid a CEO annual salary a token $1—i.e. their pay was all in bonuses, options and or other forms. As a general rule, the larger the firm, the smaller the fraction of total compensation for senior executives is made up of salary—one million dollars or otherwise—and higher the fraction is made up of variable or "at-risk" pay).

=== Bonuses ===
In 2010, 85.1 percent of CEOs at S&P 500 companies received an annual bonus payout. The median bonus was $2.15 million.

Bonuses may be used to reward performance or as a kind of deferred compensation to discourage executives from quitting. They are often part of both short and long term compensation, and more often part of a plan or formula than simply discretionary.

==== Bonus formulas ====
Short-term incentives usually are formula-driven, the formula involving some performance criteria. Use of some bonus formulas has been criticized for lacking effective incentives, and for abandoning the formula targets for easier criteria when the executives find them too difficult. According to one anonymous insider, "When you've got a formula, you've got to have goals—and it's the people who are the recipients of the money who are setting these. It's in their interests to keep the goals low so that they will succeed in meeting them." If the word bonus suggests payment for particularly good performance, it is not reserved for performance above-average performance in American firms. In 2011, for example, almost all (97 per cent) of American companies paid their executives bonuses.

Bonus criteria might be incremental revenue growth turnover for a sales director or incremental profitability and revenue growth for a CEO. They might also be things like meeting a budget or earning more profits than the preceding year, rather than exceeding the performance of companies in its peer group.

In the 1990s, some corporations (IBM, GE, and Verizon Communications) were known to include pension fund earnings as the basis of bonuses when the actual corporate earnings are negative, and discontinuing the practice when the bull market ended and these earnings turned to losses. In one notable case of executive bonus justification, Verizon Communications not only used $1.8 billion of pension income to turn a corporate loss into a $289 million profit but created the $1.8 billion income from a $3.1 billion loss by projecting (optimistic) future returns of 9.25 per cent on pension assets.

Examples of resetting targets when executive performance falls short have been criticized at Coca-Cola and AT&T Wireless Services. For example, when executives failed to meet the annual earnings growth rate target of 15 per cent at Coca-Cola in 2002, the target was dropped to 11 per cent. In the sluggish economy following the 2007 recession the practice has become "more frequent". For example, in 2011 Alpha Natural Resources' CEO failed to meet the compensation formula set by the board, in large part because of his overseeing the "biggest annual loss" in the company's history. He was given a half million dollar bonus nonetheless on the grounds of his "tremendous" efforts toward improving worker safety.

==== Golden hellos ====
"Golden hellos", or hiring bonuses for executives from rival companies, are intended to compensate a new hire for the loss of value of stock options provided by his/her current employer that is forfeited when they joining a new firm. To entice the potential hire the new employer had to compensate them for their loss by paying a massive signing bonus Starting around the mid-1990s in the US, the hellos are said to have become "larger and more common". 41 companies made upfront payments to top executives in 2012, rising to 70 in 2013. The number of companies making upfront payments surged to more than 70 this year from 41 in all of 2012, according to governance-advisory firm GMI Ratings Inc.

Notable "hellos" include the $45 million insurance/finance company Conseco paid Gary Wendt when he joined as CEO in June 2000. Kmart promised $10 million to Thomas Conaway as CEO. Global Crossing gave Robert Annunziata got a $10 million signing bonus in 1999, none of which was he required to return though he held his post as CEO for only 13 months. J.C. Penney paid Ron Johnson a signing bonus of $52.7 million in shares when it hired him, but Penny's shares declined 50% during his tenure and he was fired 17 months later in April 2013.

=== Equity-based pay ===
Linking executive pay with the value of company shares has been thought of as a way of linking the executive's interests with those of the owners. When the shareholders prosper, so does the executive.

Individual equity compensation may include: restricted stock and restricted stock units (rights to own the employer's stock, tracked as bookkeeping entries, lacking voting rights and paid in stock or cash), stock appreciation rights, phantom stock—but the most common form of equity pay has been stock options and shares of stock. In 2008, nearly two-thirds of total CEO compensation was delivered in the form of stock or options.

==== Stock options ====
Stock options are the right to buy a specific number of shares of the company's stock during a specified time at a specified price (called the "strike price"). They became more popular for use in executive pay in the US after a law was passed in 1992 encouraging "performance-based" pay, and are now used for both short and long-term compensation.

Perhaps the largest dollar value of stock options granted to an employee was $1.6 billion worth amassed as of 2004 by UnitedHealth Group CEO William W. McGuire. (McGuire later returned a large fraction of the options as part of a legal settlement.)

While the use of options may reassure stockholders and the public that management's pay is linked to increasing shareholder value—as well as earn an IRS tax deduction as incentive pay—critics charge options and other ways of tying managers' pay to stock prices are fraught with peril. In the late 1990s, investor Warren Buffett lamented that "there is no question in my mind that mediocre CEOs are getting incredibly overpaid. And the way it's being done is through stock options."

Since executives control much of the information available to outside investors they have the ability to fabricate the appearance of success—"aggressive accounting, fictitious transactions that inflate sales, whatever it takes"—to increase their compensation. In the words of Fortune magazine, earning per share can "be manipulated in a thousand unholy ways" to inflate stock prices in the short term—a practice made famous by Enron.

Use of options has not guaranteed superior management performance. A 2000 study of S&P 500 companies found that those that used stock options heavily to pay employees underperformed in share price those that didn't, while another later study found corporations tended to grant more options to executives than was cost-effective.

In addition to short term earnings boosts, techniques to avoid losing out on option payout when management performance has been poor include:

- Setting a low strike price. (An estimated 95 per cent of corporations in America pay executives with "at-the-money" options—i.e. options whose strike price is the same as the price of the stock on the date the option was granted so that any move upward in stock price gives the options value. Many financial economists believe it "highly unlikely" that this same option design would be "efficient in all cases", but at-the-money options give executives the biggest payout of any option price that is still eligible for tax deduction as "incentive pay".)
- Repricing the options to a lower strike price by backdating the option to a date when stock prices were lower (Repricing of stock options has been found to be associated with the option-granting firm's poor stock price performance rather than industry-wide shocks),
- Timing the granting of options to events that will raise or lower stock prices,
- Not adjusting for windfall gains for the firm unrelated to management's own efforts (falling interest rates, market and sector-wide share price movements, etc.) or for how the company performed relative to "peer companies".

Following the housing bubble collapse, critics have also complained that stock options have "turned out to be incredible engines of risk-taking" since they offer "little downside if you bet wrong, but huge upside if you roll your number". An example being options given in compensation to buy shares of stock in the CEO's company for $100 when the price is currently $80. Given a choice between a high-risk plan that has an equal chance of driving the company's share price up to $120 or down to $30, or a safe path likely to cause a more modest rise in share price to $100, the CEO has much more incentive to take the risky route since their options are just as worthless with a modest increase (to $100/share or less) than as with a catastrophic fall in price.

Executives' access to insider information affecting stock prices can be used in the timing of both the granting of options and sale of equities after the options are exercised. Studies of the timing of option grants to executives have found "a systematic connection" between when the option was granted and corporate disclosures to the public. That is, they found options are more likely to be granted after companies release bad news or just before they "release good news" when company insiders are likely to know the options will be most profitable because the stock price is relatively low. Repricing of stock options also frequently occurs after the release of bad news or just prior to the release of good news.

Executives have also benefited from particularly auspicious timing of selling of equities, according to a number of studies, which found members of corporate upper management to have made "considerable abnormal profits" (i.e. higher than market returns). (Since executives have access to insider information on the best time to sell, this may seem in violation of SEC regulations on insider trading. It is not, however, if the insider knowledge used to time a sale is made up of many pieces and not just a single piece of "material" inside data. But even if there is material knowledge, the SEC enforcement is limited to those cases easily won by its relatively small budget.)

==== Restricted stock ====
Grants to employees of restricted stock and restricted stock units became a popular form of equity pay after 2004 when accounting rules were changed to require employers to count stock options as an expense. These have been criticized—for reasons that also apply to restricted stock units and phantom stock—as being the equivalent to an option with a strike price of $0 "a freebie" rewarding the executive even when their performance has driven the stock price down.

Restricted stock is the stock that cannot be sold by the owner until certain conditions are met (usually a certain length of time passing (vesting period) or a certain goal achieved, such as reaching financial targets). Restricted stock that is forfeited if the executive leaves before the vesting period is up is sometimes used by companies as a "retention tool" to encourage executives to stay with the company.

=== Severance/buyout/retirement compensation ===
CEOs, and sometimes other executives in large public firms, commonly receive large "separation packages" (aka "walk-away" packages) when leaving a firm, whether from being fired, retired, not rehired, or replaced by new management after acquisition. The packages include features such as retirement plans and deferred compensation, as well as post-retirement perks and guaranteed consulting fees.

From 2000 to 2011, the top 21 "walk-away" packages given to CEOs were worth more than $100 million each and came to a total of almost $4 billion.

This compensation differs from what lower-level employees receive when leaving their employer in that it is either not offered to non-executives (in the case of the perks and consulting fees) or is not offered beyond the level where there are tax benefits (retirement plans, deferred compensation).

Prior to a 2006 SEC overhaul of proxy disclosures of executive compensation, the packages were unique to executives because unlike salary, bonuses, and stock options, they had the advantage of not being required to be disclosed to the public in annual filings, indicating the dollar value of compensation of the CEO and the four other most highly paid executives. easily accessible to the prying eyes of investment analysts and the business media. The SEC required only the compensation of current employees be reported to shareholders, not the perks and cash provided to anyone no longer working for the firm.

In this way, they constitute "stealth compensation". SEC regulations since 2006 have brought more transparency.

==== Pensions and deferred compensation ====
Because the 401(k) plans—widely provided to corporate employees—are limited in the amount that is tax-deductible to the employer and employee ($17,000 in annual contributions as of 2012, a small sum to top executives), executives are commonly provided with Supplemental Executive Retirement Plans (aka SERPs) (which are defined benefit pension plans) and Deferred Compensation (aka non-Qualifying Deferred Compensation or NQDF). As of 2002, some 70 per cent of firms surveyed provided non-qualifying SERPs to their executives, and 90 per cent offer deferred compensation programs. These plans differ from 401(k) plans and old pension plans offered to lower-level employees in that the employing company (almost always) pays the taxes on them, and in the case of deferred compensation, the company often provides executives with returns substantially above the stock and bond markets.

This compensation can be considerable. One of the few big firms that did disclose its executive pension liability—GE—reported $1.13 billion for the year 2000.

An example of how much deferred compensation for a CEO at a major firm can amount to is the $1 billion the CEO of Coca-Cola earned in compensation and investment gains over a 17-year period. In addition, almost all of the tax due on the $1 billion was paid by Coca-Cola company rather than the CEO.

An example of how pensions have been used as "stealthy" compensation mentioned above was a change in the formula for determining the pension that one retiring CEO (Terrence Murray of FleetBoston Financial) made shortly before his departure. While his original contract based his pension on his average annual salary and bonus over the five years before retirement, that was changed to his average taxable compensation over the three years he received the most compensation. This change of a few words more than doubled the pension payout from $2.7 million to an estimated $5.8 million, but these numbers did not appear on the SEC-required executive compensation tables or in the annual report footnotes. The numbers were revealed only because a newspaper covering the story hired an actuary to calculate the new basis. A banking analyst from Prudential Securities noted that while the CEO was in charge, FleetBoston's shares "underperformed the average bank for a decade," and groused: 'What happened to getting a gold watch?'"

==== Severance pay ====
The severance benefit for a "typical" executive is in the range of 6 to 12 months of pay and "occasionally" includes "other benefits like health insurance continuation or vesting of incentives".

Severance packages for the top-five executives at a large firm, however, can go well beyond this. They differ from many lower-level packages not only in their size, but in their broad guarantee to be paid even in the face of poor performance. They are paid as long as the executives are not removed 'for cause'—"usually defined rather narrowly as felony, fraud, malfeasance, gross negligence, moral turpitude, and in some cases, willful refusal to follow the direction of the board".

Some examples of severance pay to dismissed CEOs criticized as excessive include:

- Mattel's CEO who received a $50 million severance package after two years of employment despite overseeing a stock price fall of 50 per cent
- $49.3 million payouts to Conseco's CEO, who left the company in "a precarious financial situation"
- $9.5 million bonus for Procter & Gamble's CEO, even though he lasted only 17 months and also oversaw a 50 per cent drop in share price, (a loss of $70 billion in shareholder value)

In 2013, Bloomberg calculated severance packages for CEOs at the largest corporations and found three—John Hammergren of McKesson, Leslie Moonves of CBS Corporation, and David Zaslav or Discovery Communications—that exceeded $224.7 million. Bloomberg quotes one corporate governance researcher as complaining, "If you have a safety net of this type of gargantuan size, it starts to undermine the CEO's desire to build long-term value for shareholders. You don't really care if you're fired or not."

Critics complain that not only is this failure to punish poor performance a disincentive to increase stockholder value, but that the usual explanation offered for these payouts—to provide risk-averse execs with insurance against termination—doesn't make sense. The typical CEO is not anticipating many years of income stream since the usual executive contract is only three years. Furthermore, only 2 percent of firms in the S&P 500 reduce any part of the severance package once the executive finds another employer. And if employers are worried about coaxing risk-averse potential employees, why are executives the only ones provided with this treatment? "Given executives' accumulated wealth and generous retirement benefits they commonly receive after leaving the firm, they are likely to be, if anything, less risk-averse and better able to insure themselves than most other employees.

==== Gratuitous payments ====
Another practice essentially unknown among non-executive employees is the granting of payments or benefits to executives above and beyond what is in their contract when they quit, are fired, or agree to have their companies bought out. These are known as "gratuitous" payments.

They may "include forgiveness of loans, accelerated vesting of options and restricted stock, increases in pension benefits (for example by 'crediting' CEOs with additional years of service), awards of lump-sum cash payments, and promises" of the previously mentioned consulting contracts.

==== Perks ====
As part of their retirement, top executives have often been given in-kind benefits or "perks" (perquisites). These have included use of corporate jets (sometimes for family and guests as well), chauffeured cars, personal assistants, financial planning, home security systems, club memberships, sports tickets, office space, secretarial help, and cell phone service. Unremarked upon when they are used on the job, perks are more controversial in retirement.

Perks lack the flexibility of cash for the beneficiary. For example, if the retired executive thinks $10,000 worth of a perk such as private jet travel is the best way to spend $10,000, then $10,000 in cash and $10,000 in perk have the same value; however, if there are any possible circumstance in which they would prefer spending some or all of the money on something else, then cash is better.

Also, rather than being a fixed asset whose use costs a corporation less than its worth, perks often cost more than they might first appear.

Consider retiree use of corporate jets, now a common perk. Although the marginal cost of allowing a retired executive to use the company jet may appear limited, it can run quite high. Consider the use of a company plane for a flight from New York to California and then back several days later. Because the New York-based aircraft and flight crew will return to the East Coast after dropping the retired exec off, the actual charge to the company is two round trips: a total of eight takeoffs and landings and approximately 20 hours of flying time, most likely costing—from fuel, maintenance, landing fees, extra pilot and crew fees and incidentals, and depreciation (an aircraft's operating life is reduced for every hour it flies and more importantly, for every takeoff and landing)—at least $50,000.

Like other "separation pay", perks do have the advantage of not having to be reported to shareholders or the SEC in dollar value.

==== Consulting contracts ====
As of 2002, about one-quarter of CEOs negotiated a post-retirement consulting relationship with their old firm despite the fact that few CEOs have been known to seek advice from their predecessors. At least one observer—Frank Glassner, CEO of Compensation Design Group—explains the practice as "disguised severance", rather than money in exchange for useful service to the company.

For the CEO of a large firm, such a contract might be worth $1 million a year or more. For example,

- In 2005, AOL Time Warner was paying retired CEO Gerald M. Levin $1 million a year to serve as an adviser for up to five days a month.
- In 2000, retiring Carter-Wallace CEO Henry Hoyt was promised annual payments of $831,000 for similar monthly obligations.
- Verizon co-CEO Charles Lee negotiated a $6 million consulting contract for the first two years of his retirement.
- Delta Air Lines CEO Donald Allen's 1997 retirement package provides him with a seven-year, $3.5 million consulting deal under which, according to Delta's public filings, he was 'required to perform his consulting service at such times, and in such places, and for such periods as will result in the least inconvenience to him.'

"Most former CEOs are doing very little for what they're getting paid" since demands for their consultation from the new management are "minuscule", according to executive compensation expert Alan Johnson.

== Funding compensation ==
Cash compensation, such as salary, is funded from corporate income. Most equity compensation, such as stock options, does not impose a direct cost on the corporation dispensing it. It does, however, cost company stockholders by increasing the number of shares outstanding and thus, diluting the value of their shares. To minimize this effect, corporations often buy back shares of stock (which does cost the firm cash income).

=== Life insurance funding ===
To work around the restrictions and the political outrage concerning executive pay practices, some corporations—banks in particular—have turned to funding bonuses, deferred pay, and pensions owed to executives by using life insurance policies. The practice, sometimes called "janitor's insurance", involve a bank or corporation insuring large numbers of its employees under the life insurance policy and naming itself as the beneficiary of the policy, not the dependents of the people insured. The concept has "unmatched tax benefits" such as "tax-deferred growth of the inside buildup of the policy's cash value, tax-free withdrawals and loans, and income-tax-free death benefits to beneficiaries," but has been criticized by some of the families of the insured deceased who maintain that "employers shouldn't profit from the deaths" of their "loved ones".

== Explanations ==
The growth and complicated nature of executive compensation in America has come to the attention of economists, business researchers, and business journalists. Former SEC Chairman, William H. Donaldson, called executive compensation "and how it is determined ... One of the great, as-yet-unsolved problems in the country today."

=== Performance ===
One factor that does not explain CEO pay growth is CEO productivity growth if the productivity is measured by earnings performance. Measuring average pay of CEOs from 1980 to 2004, Vanguard mutual fund founder John Bogle found it grew almost three times as fast as the corporations the CEOs ran—8.5 per cent/year compared to 2.9 per cent/year. Whether CEO pay has followed the stock market more closely is disputed. One calculation by one executive compensation consultant (Michael Dennis Graham) found "an extremely high correlation" between CEO pay and stock market prices between 1973 and 2003, while a more recent study by the liberal Economic Policy Institute found nominal CEO compensation growth (725 per cent) "substantially greater than stock market growth" from 1978 to 2011.

=== Political and social factors ===
According to Fortune magazine, the unleashing of pay for professional athletes with free agency in the late 1970s ignited the jealousy of CEOs. As business "became glamorized in the 1980s, CEOs realized that being famous was more fun than being invisible". Appearing "near the top of published CEO pay rankings" became a "badge of honor" rather than an embarrassment for many CEOs.

Economist Paul Krugman argues that the upsurge in executive pay starting in the 1980s was brought on, in part, by stronger incentives for the recipients:

- A sharp decline in the top marginal income tax rate—from 70 per cent in the early 1970s to 35 per cent today—allows executives to keep much more of their pay and thus incentivizes the top executive "to take advantage of his position".

... and a retreat of countervailing forces:

- News organizations that might once have condemned lavishly paid executives applauded their business genius instead;
- politicians who might once have led populist denunciations of corporate pay now need high-income donors (such as executives) for campaign contributions;
- unions that might once have walked out to protest giant executive bonuses have been devastated by corporate anti-union campaigns and have lost most of their political influence.

A 2017 paper attributes much of the rapid growth of executive compensation to globalization.

=== Ratcheting and consultants ===
Compensation consultants have been called an important factor by John Bogle and others. Investor Warren Buffett has disparaged the proverbial "ever-accommodating firm of Ratchet, Ratchet and Bingo" for raising the pay of the "mediocre-or-worse CEO". John Bogle believes, "much of the responsibility for our flawed system of CEO compensation, ... can be attributed to the rise of the compensation consultant."

According to Kim Clark, Dean of Harvard Business School, the use of consultants has created a "Lake Wobegon effect" in CEO pay, where CEOs all consider themselves above average in performance and "want to be at the 75th percentile of the distribution of compensation." Thus average pay is pushed steadily upward as below-average and average CEOs seek above-average pay. Studies confirming this "ratcheting-up effect" include a 1997 study of compensation committee reports from 100 firms. A 2012 study by Charles Elson and Craig Ferrere which found a practice of "peer benchmarking" by boards, where their CEO's pay was pegged to the 50th, 75th, or 90th percentile—never lower—of CEO compensation at peer-group firms. And another study by Ron Laschever of data set of S&P 900 firms found boards have a penchant "for choosing larger and higher-CEO-compensation firms as their benchmark" in setting CEO pay.

==== Conflict of interest ====
Why consultants would care about executives' opinions that they (the executives) should be paid more, is explained in part by their not being hired in the first place if they didn't, and by executives' ability to offer the consultants more lucrative fees for other consulting work with the firm, such as designing or managing the firm's employee-benefits system. In the words of journalist Clive Crook, the consultants "are giving advice on how much to pay the CEO at the same time that he or she is deciding how much other business to send their way. At the moment [2006], companies do not have to disclose these relationships."

The New York Times examined one case in 2006 where the compensation for one company's CEO jumped 48 per cent (to $19.4 million), despite an earnings decline of 5.5 per cent and a stock drop of 26 per cent. Shareholders had been told the compensation was devised with the help of an "outside consultant" the company (Verizon) declined to name. Sources told the Times that the consultant was Hewitt Associates, "a provider of employee benefits management and consulting services", and recipient of more than $500 million in revenue "from Verizon and its predecessor companies since 1997."

A 2006 congressional investigation found median CEO salary 67 percent higher in Fortune 250 companies where the hired compensation consultants had the largest conflicts of interest than in companies without such conflicted consultants. Since then the SEC has issued rules "designed to promote the independence of compensation committee members, consultants and advisers" and prevent conflict of interest in consulting.

==== Psychological factors ====
Business columnist James Surowiecki has noted that "transparent pricing", which usually leads to lower costs, has not had the intended effect not only in executive pay but also in prices of medical procedures performed by hospitals—both situations "where the stakes are very high". He suggests the reasons are psychological—"Do you want the guy doing your neurosurgery, or running your company, to be offering discounts? Better, in the event that something goes wrong, to be able to tell yourself that you spent all you could. And overspending is always easier when you're spending someone else's money."

=== Management power ===
==== Corporate governance ====
Management's desire to be paid more and to influence pay consultants and others who could raise their pay does not explain why they had the power to make it happen. Company owners—shareholders—and the directors elected by them could prevent this. Why was negotiation of the CEO pay package "like having labor negotiations where one side doesn't care ... there's no one representing shareholders"—as one anonymous CEO of a Fortune 500 company told Fortune magazine in 2001.

Companies with dispersed ownership and no controlling shareholder have become "the dominant form of ownership" among publicly traded firms in the United States. According to Clive Crook, the growth of power of professional managers vis-a-vis stockholders

lies partly in the changing pattern of shareholding. Large shareholders in a company have both the means and the motive to remind managers whom they are working for and to insist that costs (including managers' pay) be contained and assets not squandered on reckless new ventures or vanity projects. Shareholders with small diversified holdings are unable to exercise such influence; they can only vote with their feet, choosing either to hold or to sell their shares, according to whether they think that managers are doing a good job overall. Shareholdings have become more dispersed in recent decades, and the balance of power has thereby shifted from owners to managers.

Crook points out that institutional investors (pension funds, mutual funds, etc.) haven't filled the void left by the departure of the large shareholder "owner capitalist". Bogle worries that money managers have become much less interested in the long term performance of firms they own stock in, with the average turnover of a share of stock "exceeding 250 per cent (changed hands two and a half times)" in 2009, compared to 78 per cent in 2000 and "21 per cent barely 30 years ago." And one growing segment of institutional investing—passively managed index funds—by definition pays no attention to company performance, let alone executive pay and incentives. (Another source (Bloomberg Businessweek) argues that institutional shareholders have become more active following the loss of trillions of dollars in equity during the Great Recession.)

This appeared to many to be a case of a "principal–agent problem" and "asymmetrical information"—i.e. a problem for the owners/shareholders (the "principals") who have much less information and different interests than those they ostensibly hire to run the company (the "agent").

Reforms have attempted to solve this problem and insulate directors from management influence. Following earlier scandals over management accounting fraud and self-dealing, NASDAQ and NYSE stock exchange regulations require that the majority of directors of boards, and all of the directors of the board committees in charge of working out the details of executive pay packages (compensation committees) and nominating new directors (nomination committees), be "independent". Independent directors have "'no material relationship' with the listed company, either directly or as a partner, shareholder or officer of an organization that has a relationship with the company."

But factors financial, social and psychological that continue to work against board oversight of management have been collected by professors of law Lucian Bebchuk, Jesse M. Fried, and David I. Walker.

Management may have influence over directors' appointments and the ability to reward directors when they're cooperative—something CEOs have done "in myriad ways" in the past. Regulations limit director compensation but not that of immediate family members of the directors who are non-executive employees of the firm. Even with compensation limits, the position of director in large companies is an enviable one with strong incentives not to rock the boat and be pushed out. Pay for Fortune 500 directors averaged $234,000 for 2011, and trade group survey found directors spend an average of a little over four hours a week in work concerning the board. The job also gives valuable business and social connections and sometimes perks (such as free company product).

Election and re-election to the board in large companies are assured by being included on the proxy slate, which is controlled by the nomination committee. Dissident slates of candidate have very seldom appeared on shareholder ballots.

Business dealings between the company and a firm associated with the director must not exceed $1 million annually, but the limit does not apply to dealings after the director leaves the board, nor to charitable contributions to non-profit organizations associated with the director. The corporate world contributes billions of dollars a year to charity. It "has been common practice" for companies to direct some of this to the "nonprofit organizations that employ or are headed by a director".

Also weakening any will directors might have to clash with CEOs over their compensation is the director's lack of sufficient time (directors averaging four hours a week mentioned above) and information(something executives do have), and the lack of any appreciable disincentive for the favoring executives at the expense of shareholders (ownership by directors of 0.005 per cent or less of the companies on whose boards the directors sit, is common).

Members of the compensation committee may be independent but are often other well-paid executives. In 2002, 41 per cent of the directors on compensation committees were active executives, 20 per cent were active CEOs, another 26 per cent of the members of compensation committees were retirees, "most of them retired executives". Interlocking directorates—where the CEO of one firm sits on the board of another, and the CEO of that firm sits on the board of the first CEO—is a practice found in about one out of every twelve publicly traded firms.

Independent directors often have some prior social connection to, or are even friends with the CEO or other senior executives. CEOs are often involved in bringing a director onto the board.

The social and psychological forces of "friendship, collegiality, loyalty, team spirit, and natural deference to the firm's leader" play a role. Being a director has been compared to being in a club. Rather than thinking of themselves as overseers/supervisors of the CEO, directors are part of the corporate team whose leader is the CEO. When "some directors cannot in good faith continue to support a CEO who has the support of the rest of the board", they are not recognized or even tolerated as gadflies, but "expected to step down".

==== Connection of power and pay ====
Authors Bebchuk and Fried postulate that the "agency" problem or "agency cost", of executives power over directors, has reached the point of giving executives the power to control their own pay and incentives. What "places constraints on executive compensation" is not the marketplace for executive talent and hard-headed calculation of compensation costs and benefits by directors and the experts they may use, (or shareholder resolutions, proxies contests, lawsuits, or "the disciplining force of markets"). The controlling factor is what the authors call "outrage"—"the criticism of outsiders whose views matter most to [executives] — institutional investors, business media, and the social and professional groups to which directors and managers belong" and the executives' fear that going too far will "create a backlash from usually quiescent shareholders, workers, politicians, or the general public". Demonstrations of the power of "outrage" include former General Electric CEO Jack Welch's relinquishing of millions of dollars of perks after their being publicly revealed by his ex-wife, the willingness of Sears to make management changes after "previously ignored shareholder activist Robert Monk" identified Sears' directors by name in an advertisement in The Wall Street Journal, and the success of the publicly displayed "focus list" of poorly performing firms created by" the large institutional investor (CalPERS). Further evidence of the power of outrage is found in what the authors call "camouflage" of compensation—the hiding of its value by techniques such as using types of compensation that do not require disclosure, or burying required disclosure in pages and pages of opaque text.

Attempting to confirm the connection between executive power and high pay, Bebchuk and Fried found higher CEO pay or lower incentives to perform in employment contracts were associated with factors that

- strengthened management's position (no large outside shareholder, fewer institutional shareholders, protection from hostile takeover) or weaken the board's position (larger boards, interlocking boards, boards with more directors appointed by the CEO, directors who serve on other boards, etc.).

Larger boards—where it is harder to get a majority to challenge the CEO, and where each director is less responsible—are correlated with CEO pay that is higher and less sensitive to performance. Boards with directors who serve on three or more other boards—giving them less time and energy to devote to the problems of anyone company—have CEOs with higher pay, all other things being equal. CEOs who also serve as chairman of the board are more likely to have higher pay and be less likely to be fired for poor performance. The more outside directors are appointed by a CEO, the higher that CEO's pay and the more likely they are to be given a "golden parachutes".

The appointment of compensation committee chairs of the board after the CEO takes office—when the CEO has influence—is correlated with higher CEO compensation. On the other hand, CEO pay tends to be lower and more sensitive to firm performance when the members of the compensation committee of the board of directors hold a large amount of stock. (Unfortunately for shareholders this has not been the norm and not likely to become so.) The length of the CEO's term—the longer the term the more opportunity to appoint board members—has been found correlated with pay that is less sensitive to firm performance. Interlocking directorates are associated with higher CEO compensation. Protection against "hostile" buyout of a company—which replaces management—is associated with more pay, a reduction in shares held by executives, less value for shareholders, lower profit margins and sales growth.

Having a shareholder with a stake larger than the CEO's ownership interest is associated with CEO pay that is more performance sensitive and lower by an average of 5 per cent. The ownership of stock by institutional investors is associated with lower and more performance-sensitive executive compensation stock, particularly if the institutional shareholders have no business relationships with the firm (such as managing the pension fund) that management might use as leverage against "unfriendly" shareholder acts by the institution.

Studies of "repricing" executive stock options—criticized as a "way of rewarding management when stock prices fall"—have found it more common among firms with insider-dominated boards or a nonindependent board member on the compensation committee., and less common with the presence of institutional investors

==== Shareholder limitations ====
If directors fail to work in the interest of shareholders, shareholders have the power to sue to stop an executive pay package. However, to overturn the package they must prove that the compensation package is "so irrational that no reasonable person could approve it and ... therefore constitutes 'waste'", a burden of proof is so daunting that a successful case has been compared to the Loch Ness monster — "so rare as to be possibly nonexistent". Shareholders can vote against the package in the proxy, but not only is this rare—"only 1 per cent of option plans put to a vote in the past have failed to obtain shareholder approval"—it is not binding on the board of directors. Companies generally warn stockholders such votes will be disregarded, or if obeyed will mean the package is simply replaced with other forms of compensation (appreciation rights or cash grants replacing options, for example). Shareholder resolutions are also advisory not compulsory, for corporate boards, which commonly decline to implement resolutions with majority shareholder support.

==== Market ineffectiveness ====
Bebchuk et al. argue that agency problems have not been overcome by market forces—the markets for managerial labor, corporate control, capital, and products—that some argue will align the interests of managers with those of shareholders, because the forces are simply "neither sufficiently finely tuned nor sufficiently powerful". The market costs to the executive of a compensation package with managerial "slack" and excess pay—the danger of outsider hostile takeover or a proxy contest that would terminate the executive's job, the fall in value of equity compensation owned by the executive—will seldom if ever be worth more to the executive than the value of their compensation.

This is

- in part because "golden goodbyes" (i.e. the severance/buyout/retirement compensation mentioned above) protect the executive from the pain of being fired,
- in part because hostile takeover defences such as "staggered boards" (which stagger elections and terms of office for directors of corporate boards so that a hostile acquirer cannot gain control for at least a year) have protected management from hostile takeovers in recent years, and
- in part because the value of the shares and options owned by the average CEO (about 1 per cent of the stock market capitalization of their firm's equity) is too low to significantly impact executive behavior. The average CEO owns so little company equity, that even if their compensation package was so wasteful and excessive it reduced the company's value by $100 million, this would cost the (average) CEO only $1 million in lost value of shares and options, a fraction of the $9 million in annual income the top 500 executives in the US averaged in 2009.

==== Contradiction ====
According to business journalist James Surowiecki as of 2015, companies to be transparent about executive compensation, boards have many more independent directors, and CEOs "typically have less influence over how boards run", but the "effect on the general level of CEO salaries has been approximately zero." Four years after the Frank Dodd "say-on-pay" was instituted, shareholder votes have shown that "ordinary shareholders are pretty much as generous as boards are. And even companies with a single controlling shareholder, who ought to be able to dictate terms, don't seem to pay their C.E.O.s any less than other companies."

=== Market forces ===
Defenders of executive pay in America say that lucrative compensation can easily be explained by the necessity to attract the best talent; the fact that the demands and scope of a CEO are far greater than in earlier eras; and that the return American executives provide to shareholders earns their compensation. Rewarding managers when stock prices fall (i.e. when managers have failed) is necessary to motivate and retain executives, that boards are following prevailing "norms" and "conventions" on compensation, their occasional misperceptions being honest mistakes, not service to CEOs; that problems of compensation have been exaggerated. And that whatever the alleged problems involved, cures proposed are worse than the disease, involving both burdensome government restriction that will provoke a loss of executive talent; and encouragement of stockholder votes on executive compensation that will allow anti-free enterprise "interest groups to use shareholder meetings to advance their own agendas".

While admitting there is "little correlation between CEO pay and stock performance—as detractors delight in pointing out," business consultant and commentator Dominic Basulto believes "there is strong evidence that, far from being paid too much, many CEOs are paid too little." Elites in the financial industry (where the average compensation for the top 25 managers in 2004 was $251 million—more than 20 times as much as the average CEO), not to mention the entertainment and sports industry, are often paid even more.

Robert P. Murphy, author and adjunct scholar of the libertarian Ludwig von Mises Institute, challenges those who belittle large corporate compensation arguing that it is "no more surprising or outrageous" in a free market that "some types of labor command thousands of times more market value" than the fact that some goods "(such as a house) have price hundreds of thousands of times higher than the prices of other goods (such as a pack of gum)." "Scoffers" like Warren Buffett, who complain of big executive pay packages (salary, bonuses, perks) even when a company has done poorly, fail to appreciate that this "doesn't seem outrageous when the numbers are lower. For example, when GM stock plunged 25 per cent," did the complainers "expect the assembly-line workers to give back a quarter of their wages for that year?" The quality of corporate leadership will suffer (Murphy believes) "if 'outrageous' compensation packages" are forbidden, just as "the frequency and quality of brain surgery would plummet" if the pay of brain surgeons were to be cut.

== History ==
=== Beginnings ===
The development of professional corporate management (executives) in the U.S. began after the Civil War, along with the development of stock markets, industry—and particularly the railroads. Railroads lent themselves to dispersed ownership relying on professional management because they were far larger, more complex and covered much greater distances than other businesses of the time. One of, if not the earliest example of dissatisfaction with high executive pay in U.S. was when the federal government nationalized the railroad industry during World War I, and the very large salaries of the railroad bosses were made public. After the Securities and Exchange Commission was set up in the 1930s, it was concerned enough about excessive executive compensation that it began requiring yearly reporting of company earnings in hopes of reining in abuse. During World War II, The New York Times denounced President Franklin Roosevelt's unsuccessful attempt to cap Americans' pay at $25,000 (about $490,000 in 2025 dollars) as a ploy to "level down from the top".

=== Post-World War II ===
According to Fortune magazine, through the 1950s, 60s, and part of the 70s, CEO pay actually grew more slowly than the pay of average workers.

Calculations of the Economic Policy Institute show the ratio of average CEO compensation to average production worker compensation (CEO Pay Ratio) remained fairly stable from the mid-1960s to some time after 1973, at around 24 to 28. But by 1978, that ratio had started to grow reaching 35, and doubling to 70 in 1989. As CEO pay grew it also became more variable. Stock market bubble busts meant drastic cuts in capital gains which were the source of most of the equity compensation that made up much or most of CEO pay.

The divergence in pay peaked in 2000, with average CEO pay being almost 300 times average worker pay. It peaked again in 2007 during another bull market. Both peaks bottomed out with the collapse of the Dot-com bubble (2002) and housing bubble (2009) respectively. (See graph above.) Time magazine estimates that by 2007 "the median S&P 500 CEO earned in three hours what a minimum-wage worker pulled down in a year".

=== End of the "Great Compression" ===
A study of executive compensation from 1936 to 2005 found "the median real value of pay was remarkably flat" from the end of World War II to the mid-1970s, about the time of the end of the "Great Compression" of income and wealth distribution in America.

Around 1983 Congress passed a law that put a special tax on "golden parachutes" payouts in excess of three times annual pay. According to business writer Mitchell Schnurman, rather than discouraging the practice, the regulation was seen "as an endorsement" by "corporate America" and "hundreds of companies adopted" the payouts for the first time.

In the 1980s the huge pay packages of two CEOs inspired others to seek big paychecks. Michael Eisner CEO of Disney signed a contract in 1984 that eventually made him the highest-paid CEO up to that point, earning $57 million in 1989. Roberto Goizueta, CEO of Coca-Cola from 1981 until his death in 1997, was the first "hired hand"—someone who had not founded or financed a business—to earn more than $1 billion.

=== Rise of incentive pay ===
In 1990, theorists on executive pay, Michael Jensen and Kevin M. Murphy, published an article in the Harvard Business Review, in which they argued that the trouble with American business, was that

'the compensation of top executives is virtually independent of performance. On average, corporate America pays its most important leaders like bureaucrats. Is it any wonder then that so many CEOs act like bureaucrats rather than the value-maximizing entrepreneurs companies need to enhance their standing in world markets?'

They argued stock options would tie executive pay more closely to performance since the executives' options are valuable only if the stock rises above the "strike price".

Jensen and Murphy believed companies didn't link pay to performance because of social and political pressure including 'Government disclosure rules [that] ensure that executive pay remains a visible and controversial topic.' With the support of institutional investors and federal regulators three years later a law was passed (Section 162(m) of the U.S. Internal Revenue Code (1993)) eliminating the tax-deductibility of executive compensation above $1 million unless that compensation was performance-based.

Thus in the early 1990s, stock options became an increasingly important component of executive compensation.

=== Transparency ===
Also around that time (1992), the SEC responded to complaints of excessive executive compensation by tightening the rules of disclosure to increase shareholder awareness of its cost. The SEC began requiring the listing of compensation in proxy statements in standardized tables in hopes of making more difficult the disguising of pay that did not incentivize managers, or was unreasonably high.

Prior to this one SEC official complained, disclosure was "legalistic, turgid, and opaque":

The typical compensation disclosure ran ten to fourteen pages. Depending on the company's attitude toward disclosure, you might get reference to a $3,500,081 pay package spelled out rather than in numbers. ... buried somewhere in the fourteen pages. Someone once gave a series of institutional investor analysts a proxy statement and asked them to compute the compensation received by the executives covered in the proxy statement. No two analysts came up with the same number. The numbers that were calculated varied widely.'

But like the regulation of golden parachutes, this new rule had unintended consequences. According to at least one source, the requirement did nothing to lessen executive pay, in part because the disclosure made it easier for top executives to shop around for higher-paying positions.

=== Post-1992 rise of stock options ===
By 1992 salaries and bonuses made up only 23 per cent of the total compensation of the top 500 executives, while gains from exercising stock options representing 59 per cent, according to proxy statements. Another estimate found that among corporate executives in general, stock options grew from less than a quarter of executive compensation in 1990 to half by 2000. The Section 162(m) law left the so-called "performance pay" of stock options unregulated.

From 1993 to 2003 executive pay increased sharply with the aggregate compensation to the top five executives of each of the S&P 1500 firms compensation doubling as a percentage of the aggregate earnings of those firms—from 5 per cent in 1993–95 to about 10 per cent in 2001–03.

In 1994, an attempt to require corporations to estimate the likely costs of the option by the private sector Financial Accounting Standards Board (FASB) was quashed when corporate managers and executive mobilized, threatening and cajoling the head of the FASB to kill the proposal, even inducing the US Senate to pass a resolution "expressing its disapproval". (The cost of options could sometimes be significant. In 1998 the networking equipment seller Cisco Systems reported a $1.35 billion profit. Had it included the market value of the stock options it issued as an expense, that would have been a $4.9 billion loss instead, according to British economist Andrew Smithers.)

Options became worthless if the price of the stock fell far enough. To remedy that problem, firms often "repriced" options, i.e. lowered the strike price so that the employee option-holder could still make money on it. In 1998 the FASB did succeed in requiring firms to expense repriced options. Following this, repricing became less popular and was replaced in many firms by what some clinics called "backdoor repricing" i.e. issuing of new options with a lower exercise price.

=== Post-2001–2002 accounting scandals ===
==== Executive loans and WorldCom ====
In the 1990s and early 2000s, loans by companies to executives with low-interest rates and "forgiveness" often served as a form of compensation. Before new loans were banned in 2002, more than 30percent of the 1500 largest US firms disclosed cash loans to executives in their regulatory filings, and this "insider indebtedness" totalled $4.5 billion, with the average loan being about $11 million. "About half" of the companies granting executive loans charged no interest, and half charged below-market rates, and in either case, the loans were often "forgiven". An estimated $1 billion of the loans extended before 2002 (when they were banned) will eventually be forgiven, either while the executives are still at their companies or when they leave. Much of money loaned was used to buy company stock, but executives were not barred from simultaneously selling shares they already owned, and could delay disclosure of their sales of company stock (useful when executive knew the price would fall) for far longer than it could normal sales by selling stock to the company to pay off loans.

For executives in companies that went bankrupt during the Dot-com bubble collapse, when investors lost billions of dollars, this was very useful. According to the Financial Times, executives at the 25 largest US public firms that went bankrupt between January 2001 and August 2001 sold almost $3 billion worth of their companies' stock during that time and two preceding years as the collective market value of the firms dropped from $210 billion to zero. And among firms whose shares fell by at least 75 percent, 25 had executives sell a total of "$23 billion before their stocks plummeted."

Large loans to executives were involved in more than a couple of these companies, one of the most notable being WorldCom. WorldCom loaned (directly or indirectly) hundreds of millions of dollars—approximately 20 per cent of the cash on the firm's balance sheet—to its CEO Bernard Ebbers to help him pay off margin debt in his personal brokerage account. The loans were both unsecured and about half the normal interest rate a brokerage firm would have charged. WorldCom filed for bankruptcy a few months after the last loans were made.

Conglomerate Tyco International lent its chief executive, L. Dennis Kozlowski, at least $88 million from 1999 to 2001. During Tyco's 2001 fiscal year, as he continued to say publicly that he rarely if ever sold his Tyco shares, Mr Kozlowski returned $70 million of the stock to the company, partly to repay loans. Later that year and early the next, Tyco's stock fell 40 per cent over "concerns that the company's accounting methods ... inflated profits."

==== Enron, etc. ====
Other scandals at the end of the dotcom bubble included:

- Enron. From 1996 to 2000, Enron paid its top five executives more than $500 million. While the company's accounting showed revenue increasing almost six-fold and its share price climbing steadily during this time, an after-the-fact study found Enron "was systematically annihilating shareholder value ... its debt growing and its margins [only 3 per cent to begin with,] dwindling". 29 Enron executives and directors sold 17.3 million shares of Enron stock from 1999 through mid-2001 for a total of $1.1 billion. As late as September 2001 when the stock had begun its fall to zero, one of these stock-sellers, CEO Ken Lay, reassured employees that his "personal belief is that Enron stock is an incredible bargain at current prices." Two months later Enron stock was worthless.
- Global Crossing. Company founder and executive Gary Winnick, earned $734 million from stock sales over the life of the telecommunications company which went bankrupt in early 2002, devastating employee retirement plans. (Winnick and other former company executives later agreed to pay a combined $325 million to settle a class-action lawsuit alleging fraud brought by shareholders, while admitting no wrongdoing in the settlement.)

=== Reaction to scandals ===
In the wake of the accounting scandals the Sarbanes–Oxley Act was passed in mid-2002 to improve financial disclosures from corporations and prevent accounting fraud, but also involved executive compensation. It banned loans by companies to directors and executives, (although existing loans, worth billions of dollars were not called in); included a "clawback" provision (Section 304) to force the return of executives stock sale profits and bonuses if the money was earned by overstating earnings or otherwise misleading investors.

NYSE and NASDAQ stock exchanges also developed new "listing requirements" for the committees of the board of directors that nominate directors for election by shareholders. Committees were now required either to be staffed by independent directors only (NYSE), or by a majority of independent directors (NASDAQ).

Another post-accounting scandal effort was the renewed—and this time successful—effort by reformers to make the cost of stock options paid to executives more transparent by requiring their inclusion in companies income statements. In 2002, large institutional investor TIAA-CREF began lobbying corporations in which it owned shares to begin expensing options. Non-binding shareholder resolutions calling for it became more frequent at corporations' annual shareholder meetings. Hundreds of firms, including Coca-Cola, Bank One, and The Washington Post, complied.

Despite the investment of much time, effort and political capital by many managers to prevent it, the accounting standards board followed suit. Ten years after it tried and failed to require publicly owned companies to count stock options as a corporate expense (non-cash), the Financial Accounting Standards Board required publicly owned companies to count stock options as a (noncash) corporate expense.

Another, and less controversial, type of executive compensation that was restricted around that time was the split-dollar life insurance policy. Companies purchasing billions of dollars' worth of this insurance where the executive (usually) held the policy and the company paid all or most of the premiums, the executive paying back the company for the premiums without interest when the policy matured. The tax-loophole allowing the payouts to be free of federal income tax was closed in 2003. (However, banks in particular continued to use life insurance policies to fund executive bonuses.)

=== Disney decision ===
In 2005, the dismissal of a well-publicized, decade-long lawsuit to overturn a huge severance payout demonstrated the obstacles shareholders faced attempting to control executive pay using the courts. The Delaware Court of Chancery refused to overturn a $140 million severance package ($300,000 for every day as president of the company) paid to Michael Ovitz when he was forced to resign by Disney as its president in 1996.

Testimony and documents had described how the Disney compensation committee approved the compensation arrangement after spending only a small fraction of a one-hour meeting on the subject, without receiving any materials in advance, or any recommendations from experts, and without even seeing a draft of the agreement. The court found the decision to pay Ovitz was simply one of the inherent risks shareholders take as owners for which businesses cannot be held liable, since Ovtiz's poor performance did not rise to the level of "malfeasance", or a "breach of fiduciary duty and waste of corporate assets".

=== Post-retirement transparency ===
In 2002 news reports appeared that recently retired GE CEO Jack Welch received $2.5 million in in-kind benefits in his first year of retirement, including the unlimited personal use of GE private jet aircraft; exclusive use of a $50,000 a month New York City apartment; unrestricted access to a chauffeured limousine; office space in both New York City and in Connecticut. This came to light not through proxy statements of CEO compensation but from divorce papers filed by his wife.

In 2005, columnist and Pulitzer Prize-winning journalist Gretchen Morgenson attacked the practice of hiding executive compensation and opined that deferred compensation, supplemental executive plans and executive payouts when a company undergoes a change in control, were "three areas that cry out for reform by regulators".

She quoted the president of Equilar compensation analysis firm:

"The disclosure of the myriad executive compensation plans - pension, supplemental executive retirement plans, deferred compensation, split-dollar life insurance—is not adequate in answering a fundamental question: What is the projected value of these plans to the executive upon his retirement?"

Some examples of remuneration that some were surprised to learn a corporation was not required by law to report on executive pay statements include benefits of $1 million/year to an IBM CEO retiring after about nine years of service; a guaranteed rate of return of 12 per cent (three times the rate of Treasury bills at the time) on deferred compensation to executives at GE and Enron.; executive perquisites of guaranteed hours on corporate jets, chauffeurs, personal assistants, apartments, consulting contracts mentioned above.

In August 2006 the SEC "voted unanimously to adopt a sweeping overhaul of proxy disclosures for executive compensation". The disclosures gave shareholders "a far more complete picture of compensation paid and payable to the CEO, the CFO and the three highest-compensated named executive officers (NEOs)". The changes required disclosure of executive retirement plan and post-employment compensation in tables for Pension Benefits and Deferred Compensation. The pension table would have "the actuarial present value" of the executive officer's "accumulated benefit". The Deferred Compensation Table would disclose not just above-market or preferential portion but all contributions, withdrawals, and earnings for the year. It also sharpened "focus on disclosure of executive perks", according to its press release.

According to one critic, the "result was to add long (often 30 plus pages) reports" on compensation plans to proxy statements but not to "change how and how much executives" were paid.

In August 2006 Congress passed a law limiting the use of life insurance policies to fund executive compensation (an issue dealt with in 2003). Companies were limited to buying policies on the top-earning third of employees and were required to obtain employee consent. But life-insurance that employers bought prior to this rule change still covered millions of current and former employees.

=== Repricing stock options ===
In the mid-aughts, the backdating of stock options was looked into by federal regulators. Options backdating, changing the date of an options issue, to an earlier time when the share price was lower, has been disparaged as a way of "rewarding managers when stock prices fall". An option granted on June 1 when a stock shares price was $100, but backdated to May 15, when shares were only $80, for example, gives the option holder $20/share more profit.

In mid-2006, CNN Money reported "more than 80 companies" had disclosed investigations of one kind or another into "options mispricing situations". The SEC listed about 60 "enforcement actions related to options" from 2001 to 2010. One of the largest stock option grants to an executive, and perhaps the largest involved repricing stock options, was $1.6 billion worth of options granted to the CEO of UnitedHealth Group, William W. McGuire. McGuire later returned $618 million as part of settlements reached with the SEC and UnitedHealth shareholders, paid a $7 million fine to the SEC, and was barred from serving as a director of a public company for ten years.

=== Crisis of 2008–2009 ===
After the United States housing market correction, "a widespread recognition" developed that causes of the Great Recession included pay plans that "reward executives for short-term results can produce incentives to take excessive risks".

==== Dodd–Frank law ====
In 2010, another financial regulatory reform bill with an assortment of provision affecting executive compensation was passed. The 2010 Dodd–Frank law included a provision known as 'say on pay'—"guaranteeing shareholders a regular opportunity to cast "advisory" votes on the CEO pay packages that corporate boards produce."

However, say-on-pay has not moderated the CEO's salary. In 2014 all but two per cent of compensation packages got majority shareholder approval, and seventy-four per cent of them received more than ninety per cent approval.

The bill also mandates an expansion of the Sarbanes Oxley "clawback" (recoupment) provision, requiring corporate executive compensation contracts to include a "clawback" provision, whereby in the event of an accounting restatement, the executives must pay back any bonuses or incentive compensation based on the accounting mistake. Unlike Sarbanes-Oxley, "there does not need to be executive wrongdoing" involved to trigger the clawback. As of early 2012, this portion of the Dodd-Frank Act has yet to be implemented by the SEC

=== Trends ===
In 2007, CEOs in the S&P 500 averaged $10.5 million annually, 344 times the pay of typical American workers. This was a drop in ratio from 2000, when they averaged 525 times the average pay.

The 2008 financial crisis drove executive pay down somewhat, but it had begun to recover by 2010. The average pay for the chief executive of an American publicly traded company fell from $15.1 million in 2007 to $10.1m in 2009, but was back up to nearly $12 million in 2010 according to research firm GovernanceMetrics.

During the 2008 financial crisis, pressure arose to use more stock options than cash in pay for executives in the financial industry. But as the stock market recovered, options awarded in early 2009 more than doubled in value. Bonuses awarded for firms that had been rescued by the government Troubled Asset Relief Program (TARP) and other funds were under particular scrutiny, including that of the United States Treasury's new special master of pay, Kenneth R. Feinberg.

==== Activism ====
According to Harvard Business School Professor Rakesh Khurana and others, as of 2011, institutional shareholders have become more active in challenging CEOs, if not necessarily the CEO's pay. "It used to be shareholders pushing against boards who were buffering the CEOs. But now investors are telling directors who should be the CEO and how management should run the company." In 2006, 28 directors at public companies in the Russell 3000 Index failed to receive a majority vote from shareholders. By 2011 79 did not, according to GMI Ratings. Disappointment at the drop in the stock market during the 2008 financial crisis has been blamed for this change in shareholder attitudes.

=== COVID-19 pandemic ===
CEO compensation continued to increase during the pandemic, with one CEO, Arnold Donald C.E.O. of Carnival Corporation, receiving $5.2 million in "retention and performance-based stock awards" for 2020, for an estimated total of $13.3 million (nearly twenty per cent more than his 2019). This was despite "running up ten billion dollars in losses" during 2020 and negative media attention to "the hundreds of Carnival employees who had been fired or furloughed, some while still at sea", and to the low salaries in the cruise-ship industry -- "typically ranging" from $550 to $2000 a month.

== Controversy ==
Executive pay packages in the United States have been taken to task as excessive, lacking transparency, controlled by their beneficiaries rather than shareholders, and rewarding the executive behavior that ought to be discouraged—such as short-term profit, excessive risk-taking of the sort that leads to speculative bubbles, or just plain failure. Their detractors have included not only economists but conservative establishmentarians such as Ben Bernanke and George W. Bush, and prominent management consultants, money managers and investors such as Peter Drucker, John Bogle and Warren Buffett. The general public has also expressed dissatisfaction at times. A mid-June 2009 public opinion poll by Gallup found 59 per cent of Americans polled were in favor of "the federal government taking steps to limit the pay of executives at major companies". An earlier poll (2006) found dissatisfaction has not been limited to low-income members of the public. 84 per cent of respondents identifying themselves as earning over $100,000 annually in a Bloomsberg poll said they believe CEOs were paid too much.

=== Criticism ===
Executive pay formulas in the US sometimes are criticized on grounds "morality" and 'fairness'—that they are simply too large—and sometimes on pragmatic grounds—that the packages are not designed to give executives incentive to perform and maximize shareholder value.

==== "Pay for performance" ====
According to economist Paul Krugman,

"Today the idea that huge paychecks are part of a beneficial system in which executives are given an incentive to perform well has become something of a sick joke. A 2001 article in Fortune, "The Great CEO Pay Heist," encapsulated the cynicism: 'You might have expected it to go like this: The stock isn't moving, so the CEO shouldn't be rewarded. But it was actually the opposite: The stock isn't moving, so we've got to find some other basis for rewarding the CEO.' And the article quoted a somewhat repentant Michael Jensen [a theorist for stock option compensation]: 'I've generally worried these guys weren't getting paid enough. But now even I'm troubled.'"

According to Harvard professors of law Lucian Arye Bebchuk and Jesse M. Fried, "flawed compensation arrangements" in American corporations have become "widespread, persistent, and systemic".

Manipulating options

One complaint of unjustified compensation is the tendency for companies to grant options to executives after the public release of bad news (i.e. after the stock price has been driven down) or before the release good news (i.e. before a rise in the stock price).

- An example of this fortuitous timing was the issuing of 600,000 options to two top executives of Siebel Systems on April 17, 2001, when Siebel stock closed at $33. At the end of the next day, the company disclosed a large increase in quarterly profits and sales, whereupon the stock price jumped to $46. Had the executives' options been granted after the information had been released, they would have been worth $7.8 million less. (Siebel Systems denies any wrongdoing in connection with the incident (p. 163).

Large payouts after bankruptcy

Some examples of high-level corporate compensation among notably unsuccessful businesses (i.e. ones that have filed for bankruptcy and/or had to be bought out by another firm) that have been criticized in the media include:

- Countrywide Financial. As CEO of Countrywide Angelo Mozilo made more than $520 million. Perks included subsidies for his wife's travel on the corporate jet and for the associated taxes. In 2007, while shareholders suffered an 80 per cent decline in share value, he made $103 million. Countrywide ended up paying $8.7 billion to settle predatory lending charges, and Mozilo received a lifetime ban from the SEC from serving as an officer or director of any publicly owned company.
- Merrill Lynch. Stanley O'Neal—CEO during the 2008 financial crisis and included on the CNBC list of "Worst American CEOs of All Time"—has been criticized for being "out of touch" with the market, and whiling away the hours playing golf by himself while other investment banks "were cancelling vacations to deal with the burgeoning subprime crisis". O'Neal left Merrill Lynch shortly after it announced a quarterly loss of $2.3 billion with a severance package worth $161.5 million on top of the $91.4 million in total compensation he earned in 2006

Large payouts after large losses

- A study of compensation from 2001 to 2006 by the research group "The Corporate Library" found board compensation committees at 12 large corporations (Affiliated Computer Services, Inc., Dell Inc., Eli Lilly and Company, Ford Motor Company, Home Depot, Inc. (The), Pfizer Inc., Time Warner Inc., Verizon Communications Inc., Wal-Mart Stores, Inc., Abbott Laboratories, Qwest Communications International Inc., Wyeth), 'authorized a total of $1.26 billion in pay to CEOs who presided over an aggregate loss of $330 billion in shareholder value.'
- A study of CEO and their pay between 1993 and 2012 found that 40 percent of CEOs who ranking among America's 25 highest-paid—241 CEOs in all—either led companies "bailed out" by the US government (22 percent), had been fired for poor performance (8 percent), or led companies charged with fraud-related activities (8 percent).
- In 2011, 97 per cent of American companies paid their executives bonuses, including many whose performance was below the median level of their industry peers.
- In 2009, Aubrey McClendon of Chesapeake Energy was among the highest-paid CEOs in the nation, despite an almost 60 per cent decline in the stock price in 2008. McClendon received more than $114 million in total compensation, including a bonus of $75 million.

Even the collapse of a company and its rescue by the US government has not put the kibosh on large bonuses to high-level employees:

- American International Group. In March 2009 it was revealed that insurance giant American International Group, a recipient of a $180 billion government rescue package, had bestowed $165 million in bonuses to high-level employees in its most troubled financial unit.
- The top executives of seven major financial firms that lost over $100 billion from 2007 to 2012 were paid $464 million in performance pay from 1995 to 2012. (These firms all either collapsed, were sold at low prices, or receiving taxpayer-funded rescue packages during the housing bubble collapse and Great Recession.)
- Robert Rubin was chairman of Citigroup's executive committee and (briefly) chairman of the board of directors from 1999 until 2009. In 2008 Citigroup lost $65 billion and the federal government was forced to inject $45 billion of taxpayer money into the company and guarantee $300 billion of illiquid assets. Rubin earned approximately $12 million/year in cash and stock for his tenure.

Large payouts after being fired

According to celebrated billionaire investor Warren Buffett:

"Getting fired can produce a particularly bountiful payday for a CEO, Indeed, he can "earn" more in that single day, while cleaning out his desk, than an American worker earns in a lifetime of cleaning toilets. Forget the old maxim about nothing succeeding like success: Today, in the executive suite, the all-too-prevalent rule is that nothing succeeds like failure."

Buffett blames the more general success of the "mediocre-or-worse CEO" on help from compensation consultants "from the ever-accommodating firm of Ratchet, Ratchet and Bingo."

Some examples of very ordinary severance pay for CEOs who departed after less-than-stellar performance include:

- Mattell. Mattell's CEO received $50 million in severance pay in 2000 after being employed for only two years during which time Mattel's stock price fell by 50 percent, wiping out $2.5 billion in shareholder value."
- Home Depot. Hired in 2000 and let go in 2007, Robert Nardelli has been criticized for "strategic missteps ... and a knack for alienating employees and shareholders." At the 2006 shareholders meeting he refused to answer questions. Nonetheless, he was rewarded with a $210 million severance package for his six years of work.
- In mid-2000 Procter & Gamble gave ousted CEO Durk Jager $9.5 million (this was called a bonus, not severance pay), even though he lasted only 17 months on the job and oversaw a 50 per cent drop in the value of P&G stock, a loss of $70 billion in shareholder value."

Large payouts at time of being fired

Severance due to high-level executives (who are still with their firm as of mid-2012) no matter their performance include

- $126 million—Gene Isenberg, chairman of Nabors Industries
- $170 million—Sam Palmisano of IBM

==== Studies and critics ====
An evidence-based review of experimental and quasi-experimental research, by Philippe Jacquart and J. Scott Armstrong, concluded that "the notion that higher pay leads to the selection of better executives is undermined by the prevalence of poor recruiting methods. Moreover, higher pay fails to promote better performance. Instead, it undermines the intrinsic motivation of executives, inhibits their learning, leads them to ignore other stakeholders, and discourages them from considering the long-term effects of their decisions on stakeholders".

The economists Xavier Gabaix and Augustin Landier, in a "major study", provide an example of how "it's very hard to show that picking one well-qualified C.E.O. over another" in large, established companies, "has a major impact on corporate performance", (Note: according to Michael Dorff, a professor of corporate law at Southwestern Law School) (and so paying top dollar for the best management talent is not cost-effective). The economists (who believe that current compensation levels are economically efficient), found that if the company with the 250th-most-talented CEO suddenly managed to hire the most talented CEO, that company's value would increase by only 0.016 per cent.

Founder of the largest mutual fund group in America, John Bogle, laments that "the managers of our public corporations" have come "to place their interests ahead of the interests of their company's owners". Bogle believes that executive outlook and compensation is too focused on speculative short term return, with executives tending to treat their stock options as lottery winnings, to be exercised and sold almost immediately (i.e. as soon as they are vested), rather than as investments. Corporations often buy the stock their executives are selling to avoid stock dilution.

Executive compensation has been blamed in part for the housing bubble that led to the Great Recession by business journalists and economists. In a 2009 speech, former chairman of the Federal Reserve Board, Paul Volcker, credited compensation practices in the financial industry that "spurred" executives "to aim for a lot of short-term money without worrying about the eventual consequences" as one of two factors in particular that contributed to the Great Recession. This connection has been disputed by financial journalist Floyd Norris who cites a study showing "that banks run by chief executives with a lot of stock were, if anything, likely to do worse than other banks in the crisis", which has been disputed in turn by other studies according to economist Lucian Bebchuk

A study by political economists Peter Gourevitch and James Shinn describes corporate governance in US and in a number of high-income democracies as "managerism", a system in which managerial elites are in a strong position to extract resources.

Political scientists Jacob S. Hacker and Paul Pierson, however, argue that the use of stock options in American corporations is generally structured more to induce high payouts and less to reward performance than in other countries. In European and other countries, unlike America, options depend on a company outperforming others within the same industry, and there are fewer short term options to capitalize on short term profit boosts from job cuts, restructuring, and/or creative accounting.

As the practice of benchmarking executives against peers gained ground, by 2012 some corporate boards began "cherry-picking pay comparisons" for CEO pay, for example comparing their executive against execs in much larger companies (used to get CBS CEO Leslie Moonves a $70 million package in 2011), against a different year when pay was higher (used to help PerkinElmer CEO Robert Friel in 2011), against executives in different industries where pay is higher (for example health-care executives rather than agribusiness executives for Hugh Grant of Monsanto), and changing back again when pay in that other industry went down (used to help Frederick Waddell of Northern Trust). According to Bloomberg Businessweek, four of five studies "by academic researchers have found what they consider to be evidence of bias in the peer groups that U.S. boards use to set pay".

==== "Pay for performance" theory problems ====
Economist Krugman argues that while in theory differences in quality of a CEO can be worth millions of dollars to a company and therefore justify millions in dollars of pay, in practice it is very hard to set pay according to performance because of:

- Difficulty in assessing executive productivity. Unlike "measuring how many bricks a worker can lay in an hour", success is difficult to determine over the short-to-medium term ("Enron looked like a fabulously successful company to most of the world" for many years), and depends on many factors outside the chief executive's control.
- Distorting upward pressure on compensation. Corporate boards who judge the prevailing executive compensation rate excessive will have to follow the herd, "partly to attract executives whom they consider adequate, partly because the financial market will be suspicious of a company whose CEO isn't lavishly paid."

=== Defense ===
Defenders of executive pay in America say that:

- lucrative compensation is necessary to attract the best talent
- the demands and scope of a CEO are far greater than in earlier eras
- American executives earn their compensation because of the return they provide to shareholders that
- rewarding managers when stock prices fall (i.e. when managers have failed) is necessary to motivate and retain executives
- problems of compensation have been exaggerated
- burdensome government restriction proposed and enacted risk the loss of executive talent
- boards are following prevailing "norms" and "conventions" on compensation, their occasional misperceptions being honest mistakes, not service to CEOs that
- facilitated stockholder votes on executive compensation would allow "interest groups to use shareholder meetings to advance their own agendas"

While admitting there is "little correlation between CEO pay and stock performance—as detractors delight in pointing out", business consultant and commentator Dominic Basulto believes "there is strong evidence that, far from being paid too much, many CEOs are paid too little." Elites in the financial industry (not to mention the entertainment and sports industry) are often paid even more. Burdensome government regulation, such as the Sarbanes-Oxley law, prevents publicly traded firms from competing with private firms such as hedge funds where the average compensation for the top 25 managers in 2004 was more than 20 times as much as the average CEO ($251 million).

Business leaders have argued that national limits on executive compensation would be self-defeating because the global talent pool for well-qualified executives would lure executives to other areas without such limits. However, according to activist Deborah Hargreaves, there does not seem to be much global employment movement among executives.

Not one of the chief executives heading up the 142 American companies in the Fortune Global 500 at the end of 2012, for example, was an external hire from overseas. There was a little movement within Europe, but overall, poaching of chief executives from abroad accounted for only 0.8 per cent of C.E.O. appointments in the Fortune Global 500.

Robert P. Murphy, author and adjunct scholar of the libertarian, hard money Ludwig von Mises Institute, challenges those who belittle large corporate compensation, arguing that it is "no more surprising or outrageous" in a free market that "some types of labor command thousands of times more market value" than it is that some goods "(such as a house) have a price hundreds of thousands of times higher than the prices of other goods (such as a pack of gum)." "Scoffers" like Warren Buffett, who complain of big executive pay packages (salary, bonuses, perks) even when a company has done poorly, fail to appreciate that this "doesn't seem outrageous when the numbers are lower. For example, when GM stock plunged 25 percent," did the complainers "expect the assembly-line workers to give back a quarter of their wages for that year?" The quality of corporate leadership will suffer (Murphy believes) "if "outrageous" compensation packages" are forbidden, just as "the frequency and quality of brain surgery would plummet" if the pay of brain surgeons were to be cut.

Though burdensome government regulation of corporate raiders and new entrants in industry distorts the free market in America (Murphy believes), we can be sure that "if CEOs and other members of upper management make incredibly high earnings year after year, it must be that the shareholders find their services worth the expense. In some cases it may take the outside analyst some effort to discover how, but we shouldn't doubt that the shareholders are careful with their money."

David M. Mason, writing for The Heritage Foundation, stated in July 2009 that, "existing tax law encourages an excessive focus on executive bonuses. Additional government intervention will imbalance corporate governance ..."

Edward E Lawler III, writing in Chief Executive journal, notes that a blanket cap on pay might do away with incentive pay and whatever performance benefits it provides, since executives would then be strongly incentivized to insist their pay be the maximum and the incentive pay of bonuses and stock options is by definition variable and uncertain.

A study by University of Florida researchers found that highly paid CEOs improve company profitability as opposed to executives making less for similar jobs.

A 2011 study by several Brock University professors of business found the market "may have overreacted" to the initial investigation announcements of backdating of options, and a "media bias" towards bad rather than good news.

== Reform ==
=== Efforts ===
The U.S. Securities and Exchange Commission (SEC) has asked publicly traded companies to disclose more information explaining how their executives' compensation amounts are determined. The SEC has also posted compensation amounts on its website to make it easier for investors to compare compensation amounts paid by different companies. It is interesting to juxtapose SEC regulations related to executive compensation with Congressional efforts to address such compensation.

One attempt to give executives more "skin in the game" of increasing stockholder value has been to set up Target Ownership Plans, whereby the executives are given a "target" of a number of shares of company stock to own.

These plans have not impressed critics, in part because of the low targets set—often less than the value of one year of the executive's compensation—and in part because firms seldom impose a penalty for not meeting the target. According to David F. Larcker, some studies have found a higher likelihood of restatement of earnings, (i.e., discovery of accounting manipulation) in companies where executives hold large equity positions, some have found a lower likelihood, and some have found no association.

Shareholders, often members of the Council of Institutional Investors or the Interfaith Center on Corporate Responsibility have often filed shareholder resolutions. 21 such resolutions were filed in 2003. About a dozen were voted on in 2007, with two coming very close to passing. As of 2007 the U.S. Congress was debating mandating shareholder approval of executive pay packages at publicly traded US companies.

Unions have been very vocal in their opposition to high executive compensation. The AFL–CIO sponsors a website called Executive Paywatch which allows users to compare their salaries to the CEOs of the companies where they work. CtW Investment Group, affiliated with the Change to Win Federation of unions, has challenged executive compensation packages at companies.

In March 2021, Senators Elizabeth Warren and Bernie Sanders introduced a bill called the Tax Excessive CEO Pay Act in the US Senate that would increase the corporate tax for corporations whose CEO pay ratio was more than 50 to 1.

== Questions ==
A 2009 study found incentive compensation did not lead to better "stock performance". The study by Michael J. Cooper, Huseyin Gulen, and P. Raghavendra Rau found "... managerial compensation components such as restricted stock, options and long-term incentive payouts, that are meant to align managerial interests with shareholder value, do not necessarily translate into higher future returns for shareholders." The authors did "not take a stance on whether this means that the incentives are inadequate or whether they do not work. Further research is necessary to answer this question."

According to researchers at the Federal Reserve Board, the "evidence since the 1980s suggests" that the level and structure of executive compensation in US public corporations are "largely unresponsive to tax incentives".

=== Proposals ===
Several strategies that have been proposed to reform and/or limit executive compensation, particularly after the 2008 financial crisis and Troubled Asset Relief Program.

These include government regulations such as say-on-pay vote requirements, restrictions on tax "gross-ups" (paying not just compensation but also the tax bill for the compensation), golden parachute compensation and other severance payments, stricter standards for independence of compensation committees and their advisers, and clawbacks (recovery of compensation for unearned performance-based pay).

Some advocates propose that the government intervene only in standards—requiring complete disclosure of compensation and making say on pay votes compulsory rather than advisory—leaving limits and/or changes in compensation to stockholders and boards. Others believe government tax and regulation of pay is essential to cut excessive pay.

Some specific suggestions are:

- Boards of directors should rise to the occasion, "to do their jobs", provide true oversight, better leadership, greater effectiveness, and so on.

==== Require more disclosure ====
- Require that board put a monetary value on all forms of compensation and compensation from all sources, and include this information in the compensation tables the SEC requires companies provide, to put an end to stealth compensation"
- Require that shareholders be provided with information on how much of the gain on the executive stock options comes from general market performance and industry sector performance
- Require that shareholders be provided with information on a regular basis of the unloading by the top five executives of any equity instruments received as part of their compensation.
- Require that shareholders be provided with information on the "performance formulas" used by compensation committees. Business journalist Clive Crook emphasizes this would highlight the awarding of bonuses when a company's performance is "well below the median of the chosen measure of success", i.e. "doing worse than most of the firms in its segment".
- Take advantage of the provision requiring corporations to disclose the gap between their CEO and most typical workers, found in the Dodd–Frank law.

==== Changes in compensation ====
- Encourage long term thinking and discourage the pursuit of short-term profits.
  - Extend the vesting period of executives' stock and options. Current vesting periods can be as short as three years, which encourages managers to inflate short-term stock price at the expense of long-run value since they can sell their holdings before a decline occurs.
  - Take away compensation ("malus" or "clawback") for poor performance as well as rewarding executives ("bonus") for good performance (known as the bonus–malus system). Bonuses would be held in escrow and not immediately vested and in the event of losses in future years reduced retroactively (aka clawed back). Research on similar clawback provisions that were voluntarily adopted by US firms between 2007 and 2009 finds that clawback provisions improve the accuracy of firms' financial statements and increase external users reliance on firms' accounting information. However, the same research also notes that executives demand an increase in base salary to offset the additional risk of having to repay incentive compensation in the event of a restatement.
  - Prevent insider trading by executives (which currently is extremely difficult to monitor or prosecute) by taking away control over the exact time of unloading options and other equity compensation.
- Prevent executives from hedging their stock or stock options in the company, since hedging can weaken or eliminate the incentive effects that these instruments are intended to have on the manager.
- Factor out windfalls unrelated to the managers' own efforts in calculating bonuses or granting stock options. One way is Indexing Operating Performance to exclude market and sector-wide share price movements. With stock options, the exercise price would follow the index. Instead of issuing options to the executive with an exercise price equal to the current market price of (for example) $100, the options strike price would be $100 multiplied by the market index. Performance conditioned vesting would not adjust the strike price but simply not vest the options unless certain performance targets were met. The adjustments could be designed to be gentle, moderate or aggressive depending on the firm's situation. A more gentle benchmark to be exceeded for example might be the appreciation of the shares of the bottom 20 percent of firm in the company's sector. Another windfall to be adjusted for would be falling interest rates.
- Including Debt or debt-like compensation along with cash and equity-based compensation. Equity-based compensation encourages risk-taking by executives. Making part of an executive compensation in the form of a debt-like instrument should reduce this tendency since debt value does not benefit from successful gambling of company income and more closely align managers with all investors, both shareholders and bondholders. Therefore, as of 2011, there are several proposals to enforce financial institutions to use debt like compensation.

==== Changes in corporate governance ====
- Abolish the practice of having a joint chief executive and chairman of the board of directors. Install independent bosses to oversee boards instead. Former Walt Disney Co. chief financial officer and director Gary Wilson states he saw "boards transformed overnight from supplicants to independents" when the two roles were separated at companies where he was a director. As of 2010 only 21 per cent of boards were chaired by bona fide independent directors (as opposed to the CEO, an ex-CEO or someone otherwise defined as a company "insider") according to RiskMetrics Group.
- Take advantage of "say on pay" requirements to cast shareholder votes against excessive or otherwise ill-advised pay packages.
- Make mandatory the audit of executive pay by an independent firm. These would play a role similar to public accounting firms reporting on corporate financial results. Since executive pay is an extremely technical and complex issue, without an audit to guide shareholders, the power to approve executive pay by vote won't be much help.
- Empower shareholders to have more control over board of directors by
  - getting rid of "staggered" boards (where only a fraction of directors are elected each time directors are elected, making it more time-consuming and expensive to challenge directors) which offers directors insulation from disgruntled shareholders and resulting proxy contests and hostile acquisition
  - give any shareholder or group of shareholders who have owned more than 5 per cent (or similar significant number) of shares for at least one year, and want to field a slate of directors in board elections, an even playing field with incumbent directors. Distribute proxy statements for them just as the incumbents statements are, and reimburse reasonable "campaign" costs incurred by them.
  - remove the board's veto power over changes to the company's basic governance arrangements and give shareholders the power to initiate and approve by vote proposals to reincorporate or to adopt a charter amendment to corporate charters.
- Take away some of the CEO's power to reward directors and put them under his/her sway and give the directors "substantial" positive incentives "to enhance shareholder value"

==== More direct government intervention ====
- Have Congress pass a law that sets a ratio of pay between a firm's CEO and its most typical workers (25X for example) and encourages corporations not to exceed it by
  - denying them government contracts if they do or
  - denying corporate income tax deductions on executive compensation in excess of the ratio. The Institute for Policy Studies estimates that capping "tax deductibility at no more than 25 times the pay of the lowest-paid worker could generate more than $5 billion in extra federal revenues per year." In 2009, California Representative Barbara Lee was pushing legislation that would cap deductibility at that ratio.
- Raise the tax paid by private equity managers by eliminating the "carried interest" loophole which taxes the profit share portion of their compensation at only 15 per cent (the long term capital gains rate). Although private equity managers make up only a fraction of all executives, this costs the US Treasury an estimated $2.7 billion, according to Congress's Joint Committee on Taxation.
- Set a maximum wage or maximum compensation for executives. This was enacted in early 2009—$500,000 per year being the maximum—for companies receiving extraordinary financial assistance from US taxpayers.

== See also ==
- Agency cost
- Compensation in the United States
- Corporate-owned life insurance
- Executive compensation
- Golden handshake
- Golden parachute
- Options backdating
- Remuneration
- Swiss referendum "against corporate Rip-offs" of 2013
