= American upper class =

Social class in the United States

Net personal wealth in the U.S. since 1962

The average personal wealth of people in the top 1% is more than a thousand times that of people in bottom 50%.

The logarithmic scale shows how wealth has increased for all percentile groups, though more so for wealthier people.

The American upper class is a social group within the United States consisting of people who have the highest social rank, due to economic wealth, lineage, and typically educational attainment. The American upper class is estimated to be the richest 1% of the population.

The American upper class is distinguished from the rest of the population because its primary source of income consists of assets, investments, and capital gains rather than wages and salaries. Its members include owners of large private companies, heirs to fortunes, and top executives of certain publicly traded corporations (more importantly, critically vital large scale companies and corporations).

== Definitions ==
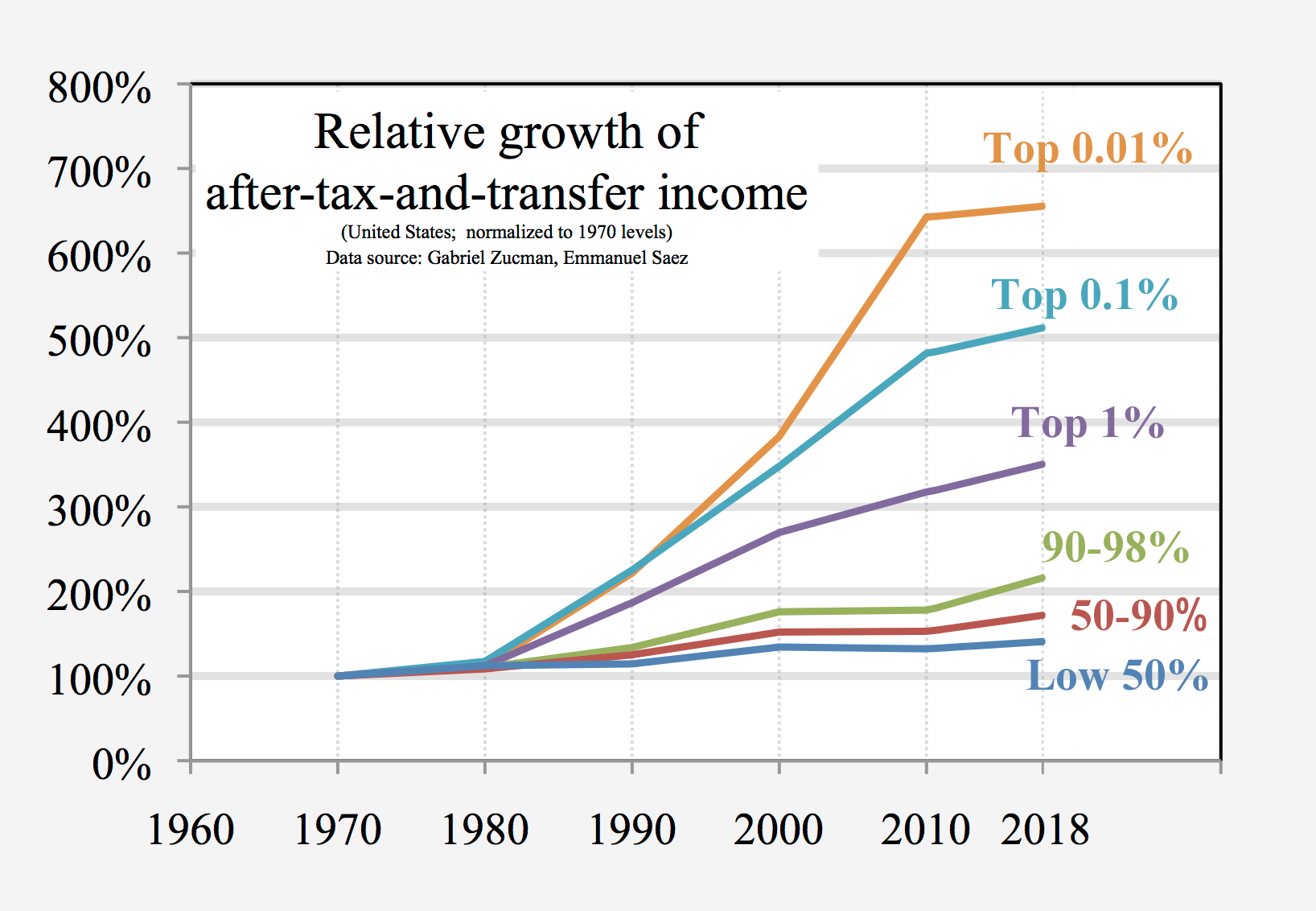
Income inequality, by percentile class, normalized to 1970 (PNG)

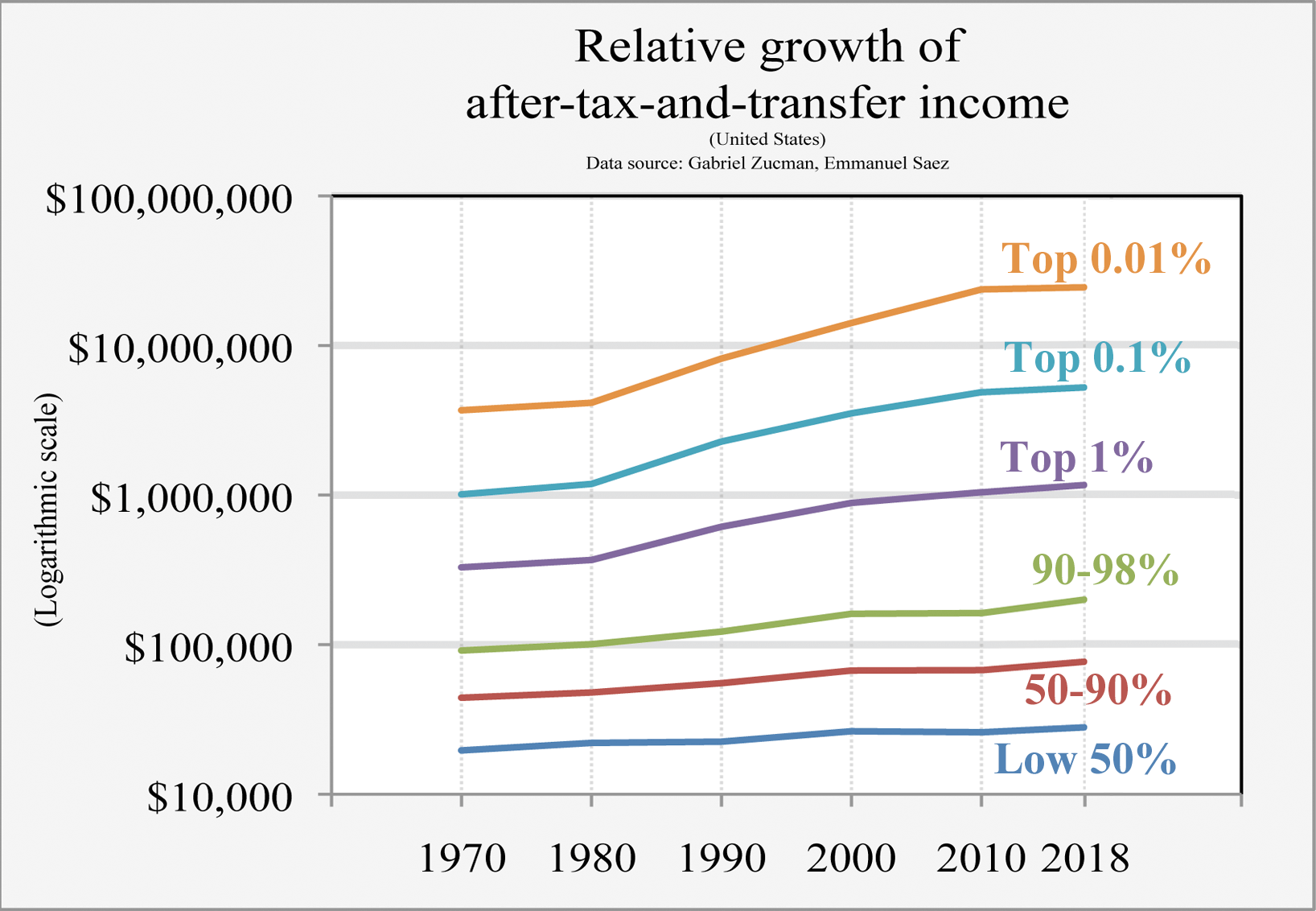
Income inequality, by percentile class, logarithmic scale (PNG)

The American upper class is seen by some as simply being composed of the wealthiest individuals and families in the country. The American upper class can be broken down into two groups: people of substantial means with a history of family wealth going back a century or more (called "old money") and families who have acquired their wealth more recently (e.g. fewer than 100 years), sometimes referred to as "new money".

The main distinguishing feature of this class, which includes an estimated 1% of the population, is the source of income. While the vast majority of people and households derive their income from wages or salaries, those in the upper class derive their primary income from business profits, investments, and capital gains. Estimates for the size of this group commonly vary from 1% to 2%, based on wealth.

Many heirs to fortunes, top business executives such as CEOs, owners of large private companies, successful venture capitalists, and celebrities may be considered members of the upper class.

=== Upper class versus rich ===
In some academic models, the rich are considered to constitute 5% of U.S. households, and their wealth is largely in the form of financial assets, such as stocks, bonds, real estate, and private businesses. Other contemporary sociologists, such as Dennis Gilbert, argue that this group is not part of the upper class but rather part of the upper middle class, as its standard of living is largely derived from occupation-generated income and its affluence falls far short of that attained by the top percentile. In a 2015 CNBC survey of the wealthiest 10 percent of Americans, 44% described themselves as middle class and 40% as upper middle class. Some surveys have indicated that as many as 6% of Americans identify as "upper class."

Sociologist Leonard Beeghley considers total wealth to be the only significant distinguishing feature of this class and refers to the upper class simply as "the rich." Beeghley divides the rich into two sub-groups: the rich and the super-rich. This demographic constitutes roughly 1% of American households.

=== Power and influence ===
The members of the tiny capitalist class at the top of the hierarchy have an influence on economy and society far beyond their numbers. They make investment decisions that open or close employment opportunities for millions of others. They contribute money to political parties, and they often own media enterprises that allow them influence over the thinking of other classes... The capitalist class strives to perpetuate itself: Assets, lifestyles, values and social networks... are all passed from one generation to the next. –Dennis Gilbert, The American Class Structure, 1998

Sociologists such as W. Lloyd Warner, William Thompson, and Joseph Hickey recognize prestige differences among members of the upper class. Established families, prominent professionals, and politicians may be deemed to have more prestige than some entertainment celebrities; national celebrities, in turn, may have more prestige than members of local elites. However, sociologists argue that all members of the upper class have great wealth and influence, and derive most of their income from assets rather than income.

In 1998, Bob Herbert of The New York Times referred to modern American plutocrats as "The Donor Class", referring to political donations. In 2015, the New York Times carried a list of top donors to political campaigns. Herbert had noted that it was "a tiny group – just one-quarter of 1 percent of the population – and it is not representative of the rest of the nation. But its money buys plenty of access."

== Theories regarding social class ==
Social connectedness to people of higher income levels is a strong predictor of upward income mobility. However, data shows substantial social segregation correlating with economic income groups.

Functional theorists in sociology assert that the existence of social classes is necessary to ensure that only the most qualified persons acquire positions of power, and to enable all persons to fulfill their occupational duties to the greatest extent of their ability. Notably, this view does not address wealth, which plays an important role in allocating status and power. According to this theory, to ensure that important and complex tasks are handled by qualified and motivated personnel, society attaches incentives such as income and prestige to those positions. The more scarce that qualified applicants are and the more essential the given task is, the larger the incentive will be. Income and prestige—which are often used to indicate a person's social class—are incentives given to that person for meeting all qualifications to complete an important task that is of high standing in society due to its functional value.

It should be stressed... that a position does not bring power and prestige because it draws a high income. Rather, it draws a high income because it is functionally important and the available personnel is for one reason or another scarce. It is therefore superficial and erroneous to regard high income as the cause of a man's power and prestige, just as it is erroneous to think that a man's fever is the cause of his disease... The economic source of power and prestige is not income primarily, but the ownership of capital goods (including patents, good will, and professional reputation). Such ownership should be distinguished from the possession of consumers' goods, which is an index rather than a cause of social standing. – Kingsley Davis and Wilbert E. Moore, Principles of Stratification.

As mentioned above, income is one of the most prominent features of social class, but is not necessarily one of its causes. In other words, income does not determine the status of an individual or household, but rather reflects that status. Income and prestige are the incentives created to fill positions with the most qualified and motivated personnel possible.

If... money and wealth [alone] determine class ranking... a cocaine dealer, a lottery winner, a rock star, and a member of the Rockefeller family-are all on the same rung of the social ladder... [yet most] Americans would be unwilling to accord equal rank to a lottery winner or rock star and a member of one of America's most distinguished families... wealth is not the only factor that determines a person's rank. – William Thompson, Joseph Hickey; Society in Focus, 2005.

Sociologist William Lloyd Warner also asserts the existence of class markers:

We are proud of those facts of American life that fit the pattern we are taught but somehow we are often ashamed of those equally important social facts which demonstrate the presence of social class. Consequently, we tend to deny them, or worse, denounce them and by doing so we tend to deny their existence and magically make them disappear from consciousness.

— W. Lloyd Warner, What is Social Class in America, 1949

Warner asserts that social class is as old as civilization itself and has been present in nearly every society from before the Roman Empire, through medieval times, and to the modern-day United States. He believes that complex societies such as the United States need an equally complex social hierarchy.

Assortative mating in humans has been widely observed and studied. It includes the tendency of humans to prefer to mate within their socio-economic peers, that is, those with similar social standing, job prestige, educational attainment, or economic background as they themselves. This tendency has always been present in society: there was no historical era when most of the individuals preferred to sort, and had actually sorted, negatively into couples or matched randomly along these traits.

== Education ==
Map of the eight Ivy League universities

Members of the upper class in American society are commonly distinguished by their extensive education and affiliations with prestigious institutions, such as the Ivy League and other private universities.

== Religion ==
Within the American upper class, Mainline Protestantism stands out in terms of religious representation. Among its various denominations, Episcopalians and Presbyterians notably feature among the affluent segment of society. These denominations, steeped in historical connections to prosperous communities and esteemed institutions, have fostered networks of privilege and influence that permeate economic realms. In terms of social status, in the 1940s survey data showed the "top rank" comprised Christian Scientists, Episcopalians, Congregationalists, Presbyterians and Jews. In the 1980s the top ranked were Unitarians, Jews, Episcopalians, Presbyterians and United Church of Christ (Congregationalists). In terms of occupation, according to sociologist Andrew Greeley, in the 1960s and 1970s, "Jews, Episcopalians and Presbyterians represent the elite of non-Spanish white Americans; Methodists, Catholics and Lutherans represent the middle class; and Baptists are the less successful."

Episcopalians frequently originate from socioeconomically advantaged backgrounds and have traditionally occupied leadership roles in many spheres such as business, academia, high culture, and politics.

Bradley J. Longfield argues, "Presbyterians, as articulate and educated members of the dominant culture in America, were significant shapers of that culture for generations." Presbyterians have exerted significant influence on American economic and cultural landscapes, leveraging their cohesive community dynamics and shared values to advance financial prosperity. Rooted in Calvinist principles emphasizing diligence, discipline, and stewardship, Presbyterian congregations have cultivated an ethos of entrepreneurship and accomplishment congruent with the pursuit of material success in the United States.

== Empirical distribution of income ==
One 2009 empirical analysis analyzed an estimated 15–27% of the individuals in the top 0.1% of adjusted gross income (AGI), including top executives, asset managers, law firm partners, professional athletes and celebrities, and highly compensated employees of investment banks. Among other results, the analysis found that individuals in the financial (Wall Street) sector constitute a greater percent of the top income earners in the United States than individuals from the non-financial sector, after adjusting for the relative sizes of the sectors.

== Statistics ==
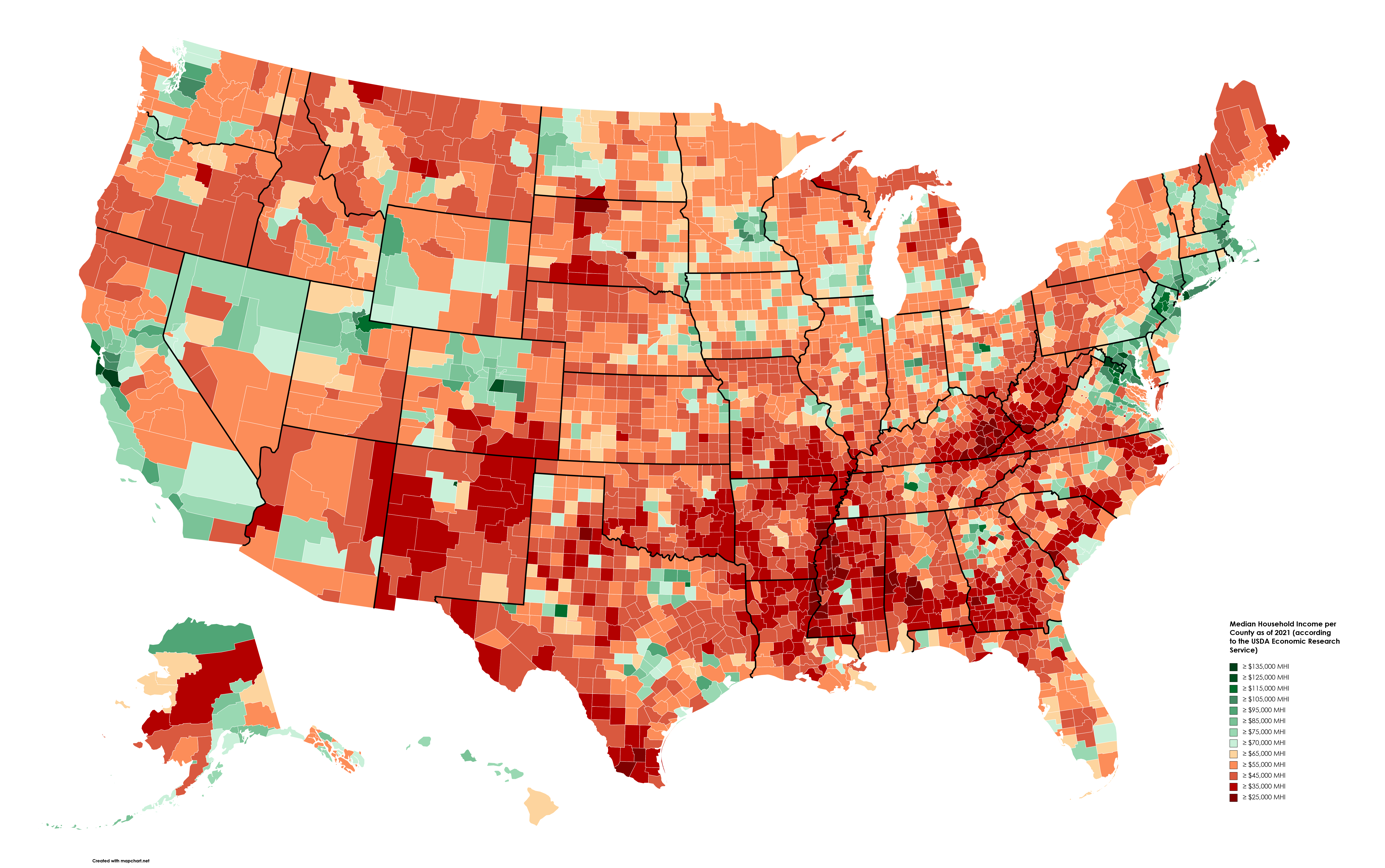
Median U.S. household income per County in 2021, showing the distribution of income geographically in the United States

There are 3,144 counties and county-equivalents in the United States. The 2020 United States census provided data on the 100 counties with the highest median household income. Virginia has the most counties in the top 100 with 18 followed by California with 11; Maryland with 10; New Jersey with nine; New York and Texas with six each; Illinois with five; Colorado, Massachusetts, and Minnesota with four each; Ohio and Pennsylvania with three each; Georgia, Indiana, Utah, and Washington with two each; and Connecticut, Washington, D.C., Iowa, Kansas, Kentucky, New Hampshire, New Mexico, Tennessee, and Wisconsin with one each.

A study by Larry Bartels found a positive correlation between Senate votes and opinions of high income people, conversely, low income people's opinions had a negative correlation with senate votes.

Top 5 states by high net worth individuals (more than $1 million, in 2009)
State	Percentage of millionaire households	Number of millionaire households
Hawaii	6.4%	28,363
Maryland	6.3%	133,299
New Jersey	6.2%	197,694
Connecticut	6.2%	82,837
Virginia	5.5%	166,596

Bottom 5 states by high net worth individuals (more than $1 million, in 2009)
State	Percentage of millionaire households	Number of millionaire households
South Dakota	3.4%	10,646
Kentucky	3.3%	57,059
West Virginia	3.3%	24,941
Arkansas	3.1%	35,286
Mississippi	3.1%	33,792

== See also ==
- African-American upper class
- American gentry
- Boston Brahmin
- Colonial families of Maryland
- Donor class
- Executive compensation in the United States
- First Families of Virginia
- The Four Hundred (Gilded Age)
- Household income in the United States
- Income inequality in the United States
- Old Philadelphians
- Planter class
- Social class in the United States
- Social Register
- Upper Ten Thousand
- Wealth in the United States
- White Anglo-Saxon Protestants
