= Derwent Valley =

Derwent Valley may refer to:

== United Kingdom ==
- The valley of the River Derwent, Derbyshire, also:
  - Upper Derwent Valley in Derbyshire
  - Derwent Valley Mills a historic factory site.
  - Derwent Valley line a railway line
  - Derwent Valley Heritage Way
  - Derwent Valley Water Board
- The valley of the River Derwent, North East England, on the border between County Durham and Northumberland
  - Derwent Valley Railway (County Durham)
- The valley of the River Derwent, Cumbria in the Lake District
- The valley of the River Derwent, Yorkshire in Yorkshire
  - Derwent Valley Light Railway a light railway.
  - Derwent Valley Productions a media company.

== Tasmania, Australia ==
- Derwent Valley, Tasmania, the river valley and geographic area located in southern Tasmania, Australia
- Derwent Valley Council, the local government body serving the Derwent Valley
- Derwent Valley Railway (Tasmania), a heritage railway situated in the Derwent Valley

== See also ==
- River Derwent (disambiguation)
- Derwent Valley Railway (disambiguation)
