= River Derwent =

River Derwent or Derwent River may refer to:

== Rivers in England ==
- River Derwent, Derbyshire
- River Derwent, North East England, on the border between County Durham and Northumberland
- River Derwent, Cumbria in the Lake District
- River Derwent, Yorkshire

== Rivers in Australia ==
- River Derwent (Tasmania)
- Derwent Creek, a tributary of the Warburton River in South Australia

== Ships ==
- SS Derwent River, a number of ships with this name

== See ==
- Derwent (disambiguation)
