= Council of Institutional Investors =

- Company type: Nonprofit organization
- Industry: Investment management
- Founded: 1985; 40 years ago

Council of Institutional Investors is a nonprofit, nonpartisan association of U.S. pension funds and other employee benefit funds, foundations and endowments that "promotes the interests of institutional investors in the United States".

== Mission ==
The association describes its mission as to "educate its members, policymakers and the public about corporate governance, shareholder rights and related investment issues, and to advocate on members' behalf". It maintains its headquarters in Washington, D.C.

== Background ==
The CII was founded in 1985 by 21 public pension fund officials and has grown to include over 140 institutional investors (public, union and corporate employee benefit plans and foundations and endowments) with combined assets of $5 trillion as of October 2023.

The primary function of the CII is to develop and advocate for best practices in the field of corporate governance. These policies may relate to matters such as shareholder rights, executive compensation, CEO succession, and board refreshment. The CII explicitly advocates for equal shareholder voting rights under the "one share, one vote" principle of shareholder democracy. As such, the CII is against dual-class stock structures. The Council also engages with proxy advisory firms, which advise institutional investors on shareholder voting matters.

The CII itself has a 15-person board of directors that comprises 6 officer and 9 non-officer members.
