= SS Derwent River =

Two ships of Furness Withy were named Derwent River:

- SS Derwent River (1915), sold in 1932 to Greece
- SS Derwent River (1941), acquired in 1946, sold in 1947

== See also ==
- Derwent (disambiguation)
- SS Derwent
