= SS Derwent =

SS Derwent is the name of the following ships:

- SS Derwent (1888), scrapped in 1931
- SS Derwent (1905), a ferry in Tasmania

== See also ==
- SS Derwent River
- Derwent (disambiguation)
