= Wagemark =

Wagemark is an international wage standard used to certify that the ratio between a business, non-profit or government agency's highest and lowest paid earners is competitive and sustainable. The Wagemark Standard is maintained by the Wagemark Foundation, a Canadian non-profit organization. There are two ways to achieve Wagemark compliance, both of which result in an organization's listing on the Wagemark Global Registry.

As of May 2014, there are 30 Wagemark certified organizations across 14 industries and 4 countries.

== Standard ==
The Wagemark Standard is a third-party standard that makes it possible for organizations to respond constructively to income inequalities by committing to operate within a wage range that supports competitiveness, transparency and social equity.

=== Calculation ===
The standard compares the total earnings of the highest-paid employee with the average pay of the bottom decile of earners within an organization. This decile is based on the proportion of full-time and part-time employees within the organization. Earnings include all tax-reported income and benefits.

== Compliance ==
Compliance with the Wagemark Standard applies to a whole organization across all product lines and issue areas. All organizations are eligible to join the Wagemark Global Registry.

=== Wagemark Certification ===
Wagemark Certification is open to organizations with a wage ratio of 8:1 or less, as calculated by the Wagemark Standard. Compliance with the Wagemark Standard must be verified by a chartered accountant. Wagemark Certification lasts for 12 months. Certification costs $200 per year, per organization. Wagemark Certified organization may use the Wagemark logo and applicable Ratiomark.

=== Wagemark Registration ===
Wagemark Registration is open to all organizations. To become Wagemark Registered an organization must disclose their wage ratio to the Wagemark Foundation. Wagemark Registered organizations may use the Wagemark logo on their website.

== History ==
The Wagemark Foundation was inspired by management theorist, Peter Drucker. In 1977, Drucker wrote an article in the Wall Street Journal that decried the corrosive effect of lavish executive salaries. Drucker's simple solution was to make company wage policies more rational and transparent by fixing the maximum compensation of corporate executives as a multiple of the lowest paid regular full-time employee.

Wagemark's founding in 2013 was further motivated by Richard Wilkinson and Kate Pickett's book, The Spirit Level, which was published in 2009.

As of April 2020, the Wagemark website has been moved. The work of the foundation continues as

== Impact on Legislation ==
Inspired by Wagemark, in May 2014, Rhode Island State Senator Catherine Cool Rumsey introduced legislation to establish a preference in government contracts for organizations with wage ratios of 32:1 or less.
