= Bye, baby Bunting =

English nursery rhyme and lullaby

"Bye, Baby Bunting"
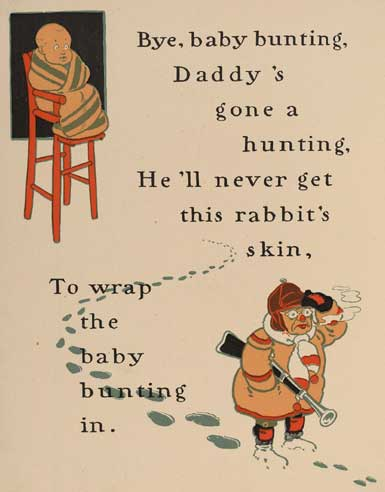
- Sheet music

Nursery rhyme
- Published: 1784
- Songwriter: Traditional

"Bye, Baby Bunting" (Roud 11018) is an English nursery rhyme and lullaby.

== Words and melodies ==
In one version:

Bye, baby Bunting,
Daddy's gone a-hunting,
Gone to get a rabbit skin
To wrap the baby Bunting in.

A number of variants exist, including "To get a little rabbit's skin" in line 3.

From 1784:

== Origins ==
The expression bunting is the name of a group of species of British birds; it is also a term of endearment that may also imply 'plump'. A version of the rhyme was published in 1731 in England. A version in Songs for the Nursery 1805 had the longer lyrics:

Bye, baby Bunting,
Father's gone a-hunting,
Mother's gone a-milking,
Sister's gone a-silking,
Brother's gone to buy a skin
To wrap the baby Bunting in.

== See also ==
- Little Baby Buntin', a 1987 album
- Dinogad's Smock
