= Wage ratio =

Economic concept

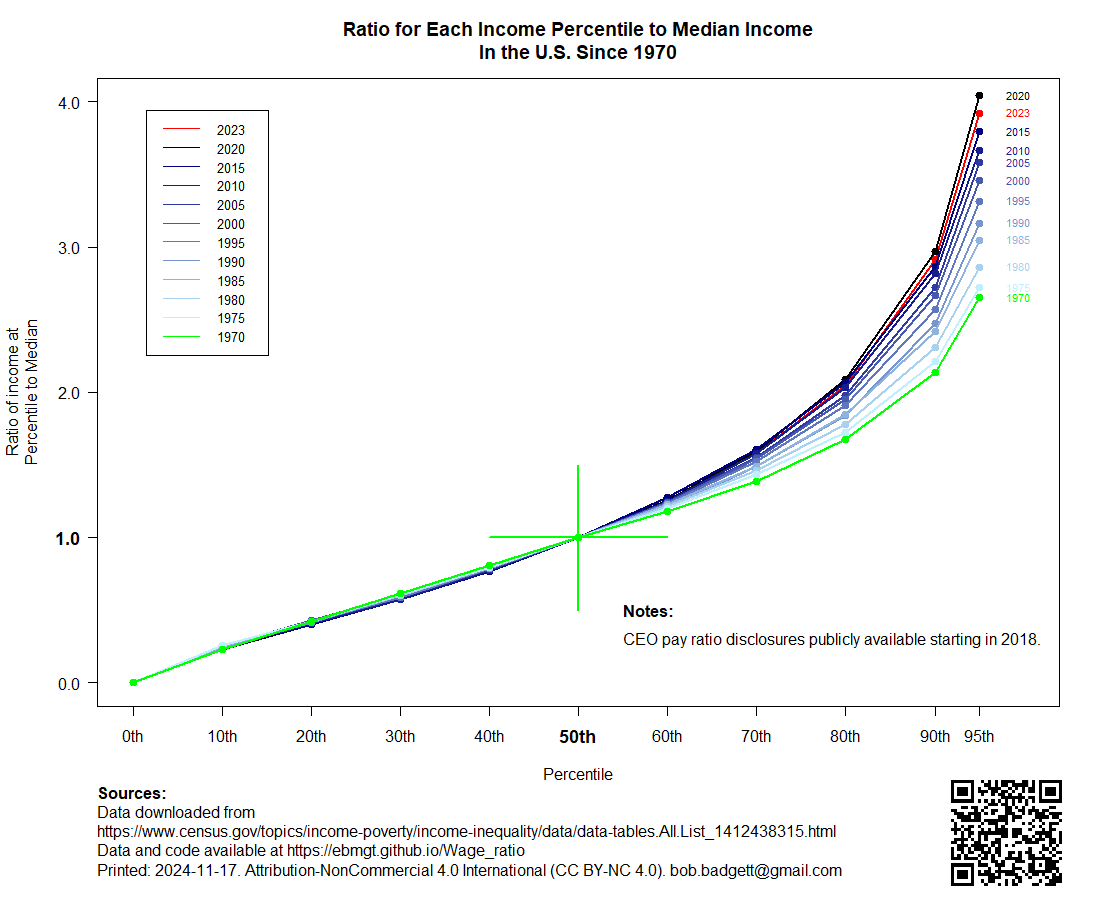
Ratio for Each Income Percentile to Median Income In the U.S. Since 1970. The plot shows the increase in the relative gains of those above the median versus those below the median with the largest gains for those in the highest percentile.

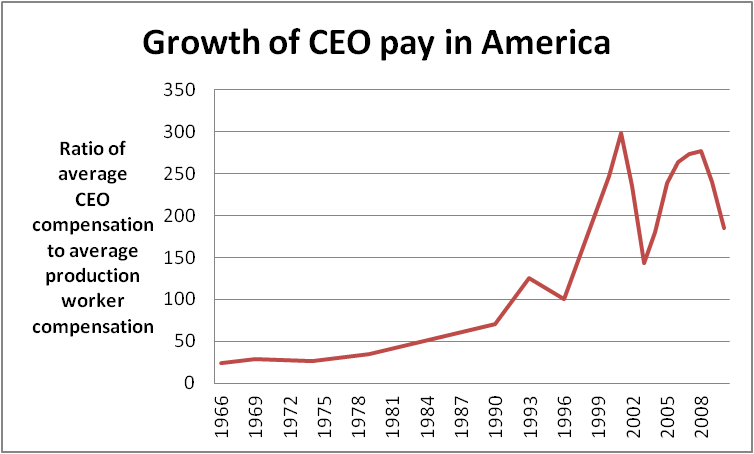
Ratio of the average compensation of CEOs from the top 350 firms and production workers, 1965–2009. Source: Economic Policy Institute. 2012. Based on data from Wall Street Journal/Mercer, Hay Group 2010.

In economics, the wage ratio refers to the ratio of the top salaries in a group (company, city, country, etc.) to the bottom salaries. It is a measure of wage dispersion.

There has been a resurgence in the importance of the wage ratio as well as the CEO Pay Ratio. The amount of money paid out to executives has steadily been on the rise. In the US "an April 2013 study by Bloomberg finds that large public company CEOs were paid an average of 204 times the compensation of rank-and-file workers in their industries. By comparison, it is estimated that the average CEO Pay Ratio was about 20 times the typical worker’s pay in the 1950s, with that multiple rising to 42-to-1 in 1980, and to 120-to-1 in 2000". While not as extreme, similar trends have been observed around the world.

Research suggests that consumers believe CEO Pay Ratios are far lower than they actually are; in fact, consumers’ ideal ratio of CEO pay to average unskilled worker is 4.6 to 1, while their estimated actual ratio of CEO pay to average unskilled worker pay is 10 to 1.

== In Antiquity ==
The Solonian constitution of 6th-century-BCE Athens divided citizens into four social classes. The highest, the pentacosiomedimni, produced (or earned the equivalent of) 500 medimnoi of wet or dry goods per year. Second were the hippeis, who made at least 300 medimnoi, followed by the zeugitae, who made at least 200. The lowest class, the thetes, made less than 200 medimnoi per year. This meant that a member of the highest class might have an income only 2.5 times the income of a member of the lowest class.

== Regulation, Reporting and Initiatives ==
With wage ratios steadily climbing, there has been a push to have increased transparency in publicizing the ratio for many of the world's largest companies. There have also been a number of attempts around to the world to limit the pay ratio between executives and workers. In support of a limit on pay ratios, it has been claimed that an excessive wage ratio may not be in the best interest of company as it harms customer satisfaction and does not benefit long-term firm performance. Nevertheless, as high wage ratios boost short-term firm profitability, the need for a limit on pay ratios may be overstated.

Canada: The Wagemark Foundation, a Toronto-based not-for-profit organization is working to create an international wage standard certifying organizations that can prove they operate with a maximum wage ratio of 8:1.

Germany: Companies in Germany with over 2000 employees are required to have a supervisory board, half of which are required to be workers of said company, under the Mitbestimmungsgesetz, enforcing codetermination. The supervisory board sets the executive wages of the company.

Spain: In 2013, the Spanish Socialist Workers Party, the official Spanish opposition party, adopted a ratio as part of their official policy. The Mondragon Corporation, a worker-owned cooperative headquartered in the Basque Country, has an internal wage ratio at an average of 5:1, periodically decided with a democratic vote.

Switzerland: Popular Initiative "1:12 Initiative - For fair wages" was a Swiss referendum held on November 24, 2013, in an attempt to create legislation limiting the amount of executive pay to a maximum of 12 times that of the lowest paid workers. The referendum was rejected by 65.3%, with a turnout of 53%, and no canton took on the initiative. The largest rejection came from the canton of Zug, accepted by only 23% of the votes, and the least rejection came from Ticino, where it was supported by 49%.

United Kingdom: In 2017, the Leader of the Opposition Jeremy Corbyn called for an enforced maximum wage ratio of 20:1 between the highest-paid executive and the lowest-paid employee for any company awarded a government contract. A similar call had previously been made by Prime Minister David Cameron in 2010 for the public sector.

United States: In 2010 President Barack Obama signed into effect the Dodd–Frank Wall Street Reform and Consumer Protection Act. In short, Section 953(b) of the Dodd-Frank Act was changed to require disclosure of CEOs' compensation to shareholders. In December 2016, the city of Portland, Oregon voted to implement a surcharge for chief executives who earn more than 100 times the median pay of their workers, to come into effect in 2017.

== Pay ratio ==
United States: The Dodd–Frank Wall Street Reform and Consumer Protection Act, which began in 2018, requires publicly traded companies to report a "pay ratio", which is the ratio of the CEO's to the median employee's pay. For example, in 2018 McDonald's CEO's ratio was 3,101:1 (although the median pay was of a worker in Poland), while in Sweden the general ratio was 40:1.

== See also ==
- Maximum wage
- Family wage
- Basic income
- Wage dispersion
- Income inequality in the United States
- Distribution of wealth
- CEO Pay Ratio
