= Differential voting right shares =

Shares with unequal voting rights

Differential voting right (DVR) shares are the same as ordinary equity shares except such stock does not dilute the promoters voting rights and makes it difficult for hostile takeovers. On the other hand, DVR shares have been described as an instrument that is more beneficial to the issuers than to investors, and it often leads to problems of low liquidity.

Several jurisdictions around the world allow the issue of shares with differential voting rights, with the United States, Canada, United Kingdom, Australia and India all allowing some form of DVR shares. The financial legislation in countries where DVR are allowed usually carries specific regulations that prevent the practice from being abused. Restrictions usually include limiting the percentage of DVR out of the total issued share capital and only allowing DVR shared for companies with distributable profits who have not defaulted in filing annual accounts and returns for at least three financial years.

== See also ==
- One share, one vote
