= One share, one vote =

One share, one vote is a standard found in corporate law and corporate governance, which suggests that each person who invests money in a company has one vote per share of the company they own, equally with other shareholders. Often, shares with one vote each are referred to as common stock. Most systems of corporate law discourage shares without votes unless they have preferential dividends or liquidation rights, and shares with multiple voting rights are discouraged altogether so as to prevent the concentration of corporate power.

== Countries with this system ==
- The United Kingdom
- Canada
- The Commonwealth of Australia
- The Federal Republic of Nigeria
- New Zealand
- The People's Republic of China
- Jamaica
- Ghana
- United States

== History ==
Historically, more corporations followed the rule of one person, one vote, so that the corporate power of wealthy investors was capped. This practice declined over the late 19th century. During the 1920s and 1930s, the practice of multiple voting shares, and voteless shares, without any preferential rights became widespread, resulting in the disenfranchisement of many ordinary investors. This was halted by stock exchange regulation and corporate law amendments in most countries.

== See also ==
- Differential voting right shares
- UK company law
- US corporate law
- One member, one vote and One person, one vote, in political parties
