= Derwent Reservoir =

There are two Derwent Reservoirs in England:

- Derwent Reservoir (Derbyshire)
- Derwent Reservoir (North East England) on the border between County Durham and Northumberland
