= HMAS Derwent =

One ship and one shore base of the Royal Australian Navy have been named HMAS Derwent, after the River Derwent in Tasmania.

- HMAS Derwent (naval base), a naval base in Tasmania, renamed HMAS Huon in 1942 to avoid confusion with HMS Derwent.
- HMAS Derwent (DE 49), a River-class destroyer escort which entered service in 1964, left service in 1994, and sunk as an artificial reef

== Battle honours ==
One battle honour was awarded to the destroyer escort Derwent, which will be inherited by future ships of the name:

- Malaysia 1964–66

== See also ==
- HMS Derwent, several British warships of the same name
