= HMS Derwent =

Three ships of the Royal Navy have borne the name HMS Derwent:

- HMS Derwent (1807) was a Cruizer-class brig-sloop launched in 1807 and sold in 1817. Along with HMS Solebay they were the first ships in the West Africa Squadron which was established to interdict and end the Trans Atlantic Slave Trade.
- HMS Derwent (1903) was a River-class destroyer launched in 1903 and sunk by a mine in 1917.
- HMS Derwent (L83) was a Hunt-class destroyer launched in 1940. She was damaged by a torpedo in 1943 and not repaired, being scrapped in 1947.

== See also ==
- HMAS Derwent
