= CEO Pay Ratio =

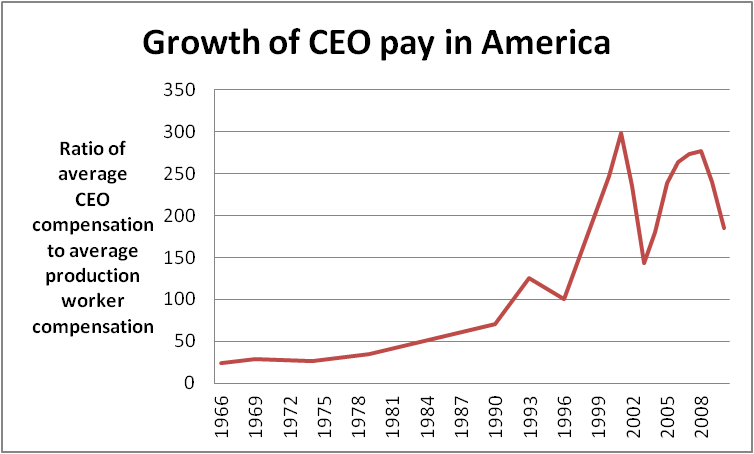
Ratio of the average compensation of CEOs from the top 350 firms and production workers, 1965–2009. Source: Economic Policy Institute. 2012. Based on data from Wall Street Journal/Mercer, Hay Group 2010.

The CEO Pay Ratio is the wage ratio between the chief executive officer and the other employees of a company.

In the United States, Section 953(b) of the Dodd-Frank Wall Street Reform and Consumer Protection Act requires publicly traded companies to disclose (1) the median total annual compensation of all employees other than the CEO and (2) the ratio of the CEO's annual total compensation to that of the median employee, (3) the wage ratio of the CEO to the median employee.

The proxy season 2018 was the first year that CEO Pay Ratio data was publicly available. There remain questions in the scholarly literature to what extent and with what accuracy firms comply with the spirit and letter of the reporting standards laid out in Section 953(b).

== UK pay ratios ==
In the UK, all quoted public companies with over 250 UK employees provide pay ratios between their highest earner and pay at the 25th, 50th and 75th percentile of their workforce (UK only). This measure was brought in by the Conservative government with the aim of providing greater transparency on pay. The High Pay Centre publishes a regular analysis of the ratios.

== See also ==
- Dodd-Frank Wall Street Reform and Consumer Protection Act
- Executive compensation
- Compensation in the United States
- Gini coefficient
- Remuneration
- Wage ratio
- Distribution of wealth
