= Derwent Valley Railway =

The Derwent Valley Railway may refer to:

- The Derwent Valley Light Railway, a preserved railway in North Yorkshire, England
- The Derwent Valley Railway (Tasmania), a heritage railway in Tasmania, Australia
- The Derwent Valley line, part of the British national rail network in Derbyshire
- The Derwent Valley Railway (County Durham), a disused former rail line in North East England, now the Derwent Walk Country Park
