= Universities in the United Kingdom =

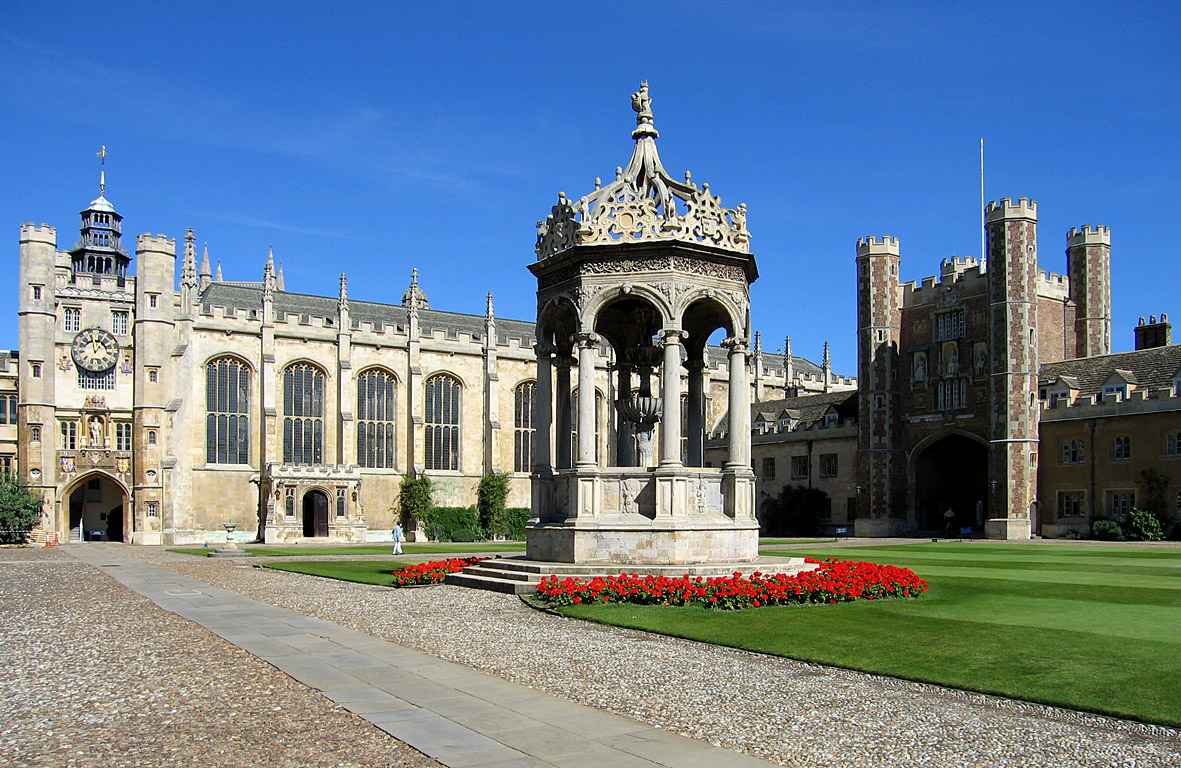
Trinity College at the University of Cambridge

Universities in the United Kingdom have generally been instituted by royal charter, papal bull, Act of Parliament, or an instrument of government under the Further and Higher Education Act 1992 or the Higher Education and Research Act 2017. Degree awarding powers and the 'university' title are protected by law, although the precise arrangements for gaining these vary between the constituent countries of the United Kingdom.

Institutions that hold degree awarding powers are termed recognised bodies, this list includes all universities, university colleges and colleges of the University of London, some higher education colleges, and the Archbishop of Canterbury. Degree courses may also be provided at listed bodies, leading to degrees validated by a recognised body. Undergraduate applications to almost all UK universities are managed by the Universities and Colleges Admissions Service (UCAS).

While legally, 'university' refers to an institution that has been granted the right to use the title, in common usage it now normally includes colleges of the University of London, including in official documents such as the Dearing Report.

The representative bodies for higher education providers in the United Kingdom are Universities UK, GuildHE and Independent Higher Education. The responsible minister within the Department for Education is the Minister of State for Skills, currently Jacqui Smith.

UK universities have a wide range of clubs and societies catering to various interests, from sports and music to politics and culture.

== History ==
=== Ancient universities ===
Universities in Britain date back to the dawn of mediaeval studium generale, with Oxford and Cambridge taking their place among the world's oldest universities. No other universities were successfully founded in England during this period; opposition from Oxford and Cambridge blocked attempts to establish universities in Northampton and Stamford. Medical schools in London (i.e., Barts and St Thomas's), though not universities in their own right, were among the first to provide medical teaching in England.

In Scotland, St Andrew's, Glasgow and King's College, Aberdeen were founded by papal bull. Post-Reformation, these were joined by Edinburgh, Marischal College, Aberdeen, and the short-lived Fraserburgh University. In England, meanwhile, Henry VIII's plan to found a university in Durham came to nothing and a later attempt to found a university at Durham during the Commonwealth was successfully opposed by Oxford and Cambridge. Gresham College was, however, established in London in the late 16th century, despite concerns expressed by Cambridge. In Ireland, Trinity College Dublin was founded as "the mother of a University" by a royal charter from Queen Elizabeth.

The 18th century saw the establishment of medical schools at Edinburgh and Glasgow universities and at hospitals in London. A number of dissenting academies were also established. But the next attempt to found a university did not come until the Andersonian Institute (now Strathclyde University) was established in Glasgow in 1798.

=== 19th-century expansion ===
The French Revolution and the ensuing Napoleonic Wars led to over 40% of universities in Europe closing. From 153 universities in 1789, numbers fell to only 83 in 1815. The next quarter century saw a rebound, with 15 new universities founded, bringing numbers back to 98 by 1840.

In England, the late 18th and early 19th centuries saw the arrival of Catholic seminaries driven from the continent by the French Revolution and the establishment of the St Bees Theological College to train Anglican priests in 1816. The first Anglican college to move beyond specialist training to provide a more general university education in Arts was in Wales: St David's College, Lampeter (now part of the University of Wales, Trinity Saint David) was founded in 1822, opened in 1827, and gained a royal charter in 1828.

By then, the higher education revolution was well under way. Between 1824 and 1834 ten medical schools were established in provincial cities; many of these went on to form the nuclei of the redbrick universities, and in 1825 there was serious talk of founding a third English university in York. This would, however, have required government support. The opinion of Robert Peel – cabinet minister and MP for Oxford University – was sought, and (after consulting with his constituents) he advised against proceeding.

This period also saw the establishment of Mechanics Institutes in a number of cities. The first of these, established in Edinburgh in 1821, would eventually become Heriot-Watt University, while the London Mechanics Institute, established in 1823, developed into Birkbeck, University of London. Many others would eventually become polytechnics and then, in 1992, universities. The Polytechnic Institution (now the University of Westminster) opened at 309 Regent Street, London, in August 1838, to provide "practical knowledge of the various arts and branches of science connected with manufacturers, mining operations and rural economy".

Very soon after news of the York scheme broke, Thomas Campbell wrote to The Times proposing a university be founded in London. This would become UCL, founded in 1826 as a joint stock company under the name of London University. Due to its lack of theology teaching, its willingness to grant degrees (if it were given this power) to non-Anglicans, and its unauthorised assumption of the title of "university", this inspired calls in 1827 for the foundation of a 'true and genuine "London University"' by royal charter, to be known (in the same manner as Edinburgh was officially known as the College of King James VI) as "The College of King George IV in London". This became King's College London, granted a royal charter in 1829 – but as a college rather than a university.

UCL was revolutionary not just in admitting non-Anglicans (indeed non-Anglicans were allowed to study at Cambridge, but not to take degrees, and UCL could not grant them degrees); it also pioneered the study of modern languages and of geography, as well as appointing the first Professor of English Language and Literature, although the study of English Literature as a distinct subject was pioneered by King's College London. Neither of the colleges was residential – a break from the two ancient English universities, although non-residential universities were the norm in Scotland.

In 1830, a Whig government was elected with Earl Grey as Prime Minister, and in early 1831 news broke that a charter was to be granted to the London University, officially recognising it as a university and thus enabling it to award degrees. Cambridge voted to petition the King not to allow the awarding of degrees with the same name as theirs or Oxford's. The charter was blocked.

Then, later in 1831, a plan was announced to found a university in Durham. Grey's government supported the bill to establish the university, despite it limiting its degrees to Anglicans. Thus the University of Durham was established by Act of Parliament in 1832, and opened in 1833. In 1836 it pioneered the system of external examiners for its final degree examinations, bringing in Oxford academics to ensure the same standards. It was incorporated by royal charter in 1837 and awarded its first degrees the same year. In 1838 it opened Britain's first course in engineering, and in 1846 pioneered "halls" accommodation, where students let rooms ready-furnished and serviced by shared staff, and took all their meals together. This was in contrast to the system at Oxford and Cambridge (and in Durham's original college) where students had to furnish their own rooms, supply their own servants, and provide their own food.

In 1834, the House of Commons backed the granting of a charter to the London University. In 1835, the government responded by announcing its intention to establish the University of London as an examining board that would grant degrees to affiliated colleges and medical schools. This was done in 1836, with the old London University accepting a charter as a college under the name of University College, London.

The new University of London achieved one of the principal goals of the founders of UCL: it would award degrees without any religious test, the first university in England to do so. The first degrees were conferred in 1839 to students from UCL and King's College London. But from 1840 it affiliated other colleges and schools, opening up the possibility of degrees for many students who would not previously have attended a university. Another big step came in 1858 when the system of affiliated colleges was abandoned and London degrees were opened to any man who passed the examination. From 1878, University of London degrees were opened to women – the first in the United Kingdom.

In 1845, Queen's Colleges were established across Ireland: in Belfast, Cork and Galway, followed by the establishment of the Queen's University of Ireland in 1850 as a federal university encompassing the three colleges. In response, the Catholic University of Ireland (never recognised as a university by the British state, although granted degree awarding power by the Pope) was established in Dublin by the Catholic Church. This eventually led to the dissolution of the Queen's University in 1879 and its replacement by the Royal University of Ireland, an examining board after the pattern of the University of London.

The first women's college was Bedford College in London, which opened in 1849. It was followed by Royal Holloway (with which it merged in the 1980s) and the London School of Medicine for Women in London and colleges in Oxford and Cambridge. After London opened its degrees to women in 1878, UCL opened its courses in Arts, Law and Science to women, although it took the First World War to open up the London medical schools. By the end of the 19th century, the only British universities not granting degrees to women were Oxford, Cambridge and Dublin.

Non-Anglicans were admitted to degrees at Oxford in 1854, Cambridge in 1856 and Durham in 1865. The remaining tests were (except in theology) removed by the Universities Tests Act 1871, allowing non-Anglicans to become full members of the university (membership of Convocation at Oxford and Durham or the Senate at Cambridge) and to hold teaching positions.

An Act of Parliament was passed in 1858 that modernised the constitutions of all of the Scottish universities. Under this Act, the two universities in Aberdeen were united into the University of Aberdeen (explicitly preserving the foundation date of King's College) and the University of Edinburgh was made independent from the town corporation.

The first of the civic university colleges was the Anglican Queen's College, Birmingham, built on the nucleus of the Birmingham Medical School, which gained its royal charter in 1843 but did not ultimately prove a success. This was followed in 1851 by Owens College, Manchester. Further university colleges followed in Newcastle (1871), notable for admitting women to its courses from the start, Aberystwyth (1872), Leeds (1874), Bristol (1876), Sheffield (1879), Mason College, Birmingham (1880), Dundee (1881), Liverpool (1881), Nottingham (1881), Cardiff (1883), and Bangor (1884). With the exceptions of Newcastle (associated with Durham) and Dundee (associated with St Andrews), all of the university colleges prepared their students for London degrees.

In the late 1870s, Owens College applied for university status. After objections by other civic colleges, it was decided instead to erect the Victoria University as a federal body, with Owens College as, initially, its only college. It was joined by Liverpool in 1884 and Leeds in 1887.

In 1889, government funding was provided to the English provincial university colleges (with the exception of Queen's College, Birmingham), along with Dundee in Scotland, and UCL and King's College in London. Government funding was already being provided to the ancient Scottish universities, the University of London, and to the Welsh and Irish colleges. Bedford College in London (1894), Reading (1901) and Southampton (1902) were later added to the grant to university colleges.

In 1893, the University of Wales was established as another federal body, uniting the colleges in Aberystwyth, Cardiff and Bangor, but not St David's College, Lampeter.

The late 19th century saw UCL and King's College London campaigning for a say in how the University of London was run, alongside a campaign for a "teaching university" for London. Royal commissions were held and a charter was drawn up for the "Albert University" that would have seen the two colleges leave the University of London and form a federal body, like the colleges of the Victoria University. In the end it was decided to reform the University of London itself, this was put into effect by an Act of Parliament in 1898, leading to completely new statutes establishing the federal University of London in 1900.

=== 20th century ===
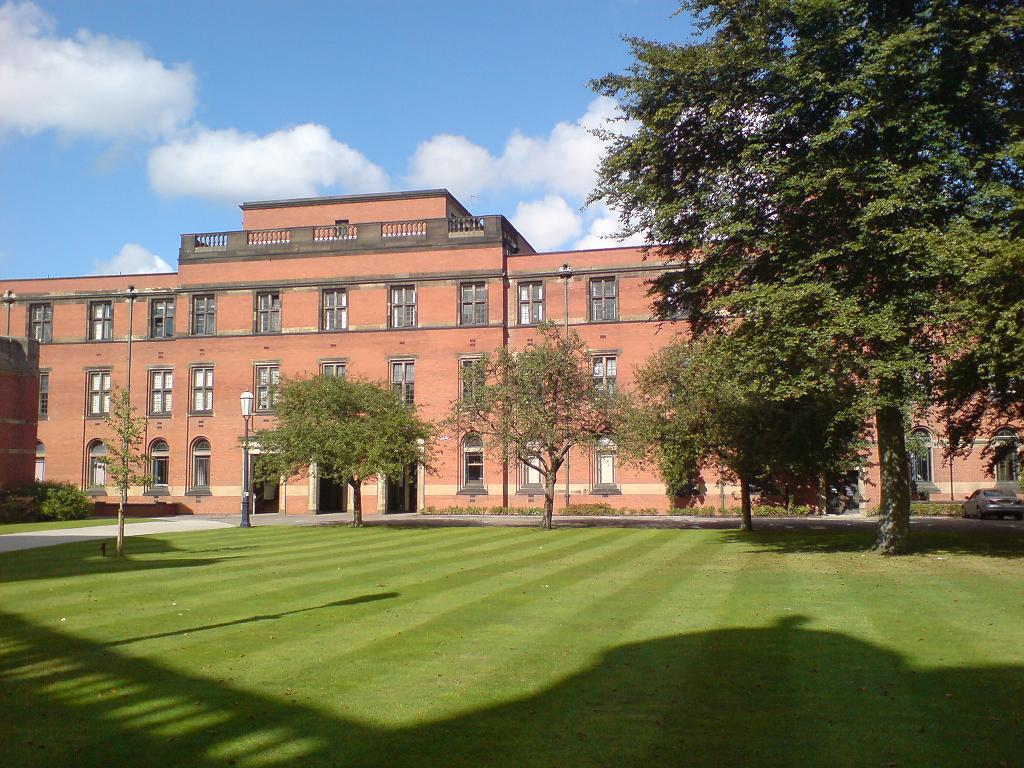
University of Birmingham, the first of the red-brick generation

1900 also saw Mason College, Birmingham (which had absorbed the Medical School from Queen's College in 1892) become the University of Birmingham. This was the first of the redbrick universities to gain university status. Over the next decade the Victoria University dissolved, its colleges becoming the universities of Manchester, Leeds, and Liverpool, and the colleges in Sheffield and Bristol also gained university status as the University of Sheffield and the University of Bristol. The last of the original provincial university colleges, in Newcastle, remained connected to the University of Durham, but moved to a federal structure with equal Newcastle and Durham divisions. In Ireland, Queen's College Belfast became Queen's University Belfast, and the other colleges formed the National University of Ireland, replacing the Royal University.

The First World War caused financial crises in many British universities and university colleges. This led to the formation of the University Grants Committee after the war, with Oxford, Cambridge and the Durham division of Durham University finally accepting government funding. Only one institution, Reading University (1926), became a university between the wars. New university colleges were set up in Swansea (1920), Leicester (1921), Exeter (1922) and Hull (1927).

=== Expansion after 1945 ===
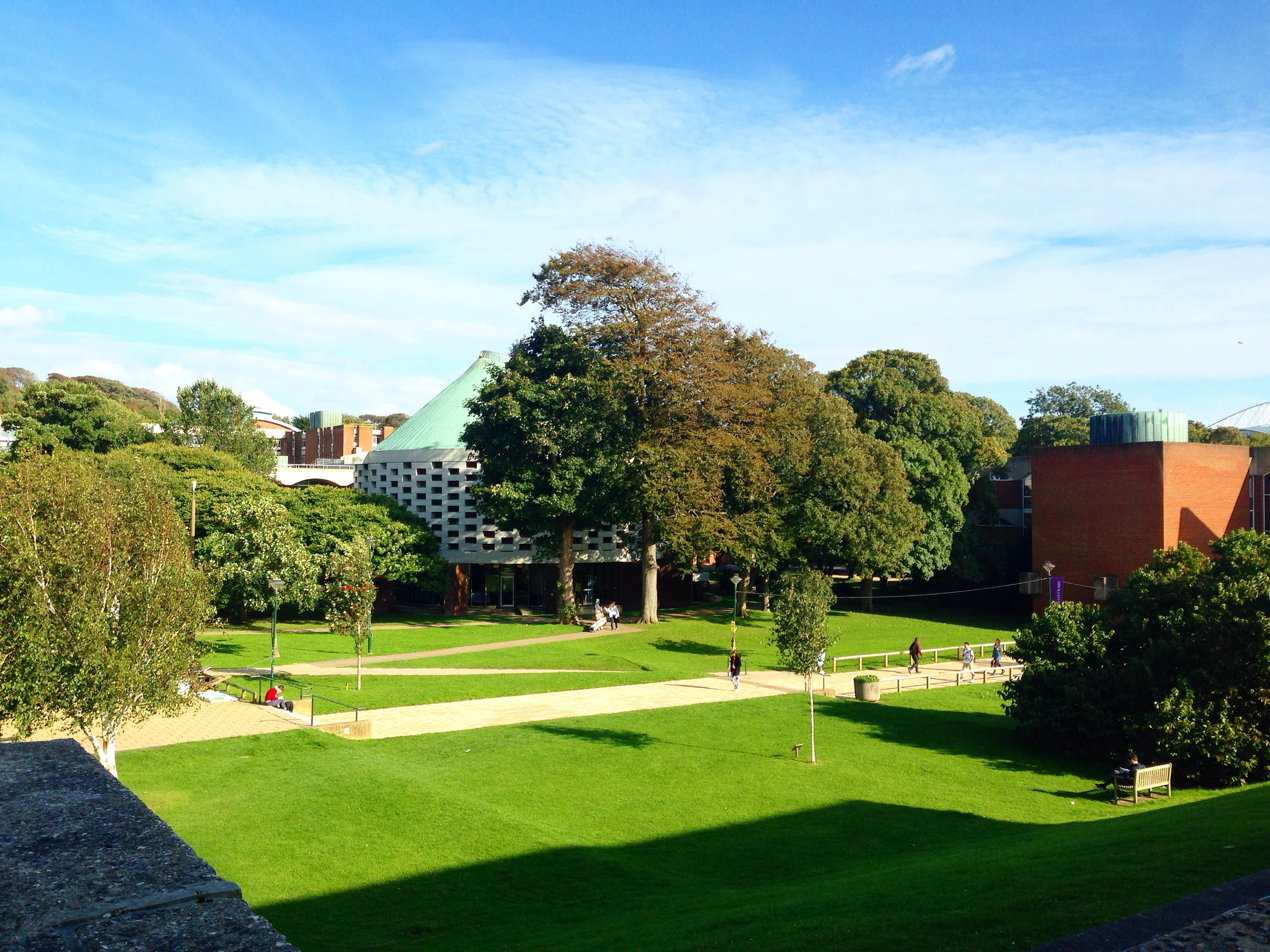
University of Sussex, the first of the plate-glass generation

After the Second World War, there was an enormous expansion in the demand for higher education. A final public university college was set up in Keele in 1949; this was the first university college to receive full degree awarding powers as a college rather than on becoming a university (St David's College, Lampeter, held limited degree awarding power from the mid 19th century, but could only award BA and BD degrees). In 1952, there were just 18 universities in the UK: Oxford, Cambridge, St Andrews, Glasgow, Aberdeen, Edinburgh, Durham, London, Wales, Birmingham, Manchester, Liverpool, Leeds, Sheffield, Queen’s University Belfast, Bristol, Reading and Nottingham.

Between 1948 (Nottingham) and 1967 (Dundee) all of the university colleges (except those that had become colleges of the University of London) achieved independent university status. Newcastle University is notable for having been made a university in 1963 by Act of Parliament rather than by royal charter. The 1960s saw a large expansion in the number of universities in the UK with eight universities, known as the plateglass universities, established as new institutions rather than from earlier university colleges, a number of other institutions that had not been university colleges promoted directly to university status following the Robbins Report in 1963, and the Open University founded as a distance-learning University.

In 1973, the University College at Buckingham was established as a private sector, non-profit college, opening in 1976. It awarded "licences" that were externally examined in the same manner as degrees, rather than being associated with the University of London or another parent university like the earlier university colleges. In 1983, it became the UK's first private university after being granted a royal charter as the University of Buckingham.

=== Since 1992 ===
A major change to UK higher education occurred in 1992 with the abolition of the "binary divide" between universities and polytechnics. By the Further and Higher Education Act 1992, the polytechnics and the Scottish central institutions all became universities. These post-1992 (or "new") institutions nearly doubled the number of universities in the UK.

In 1993, the University of London underwent a major shake-up, with the larger colleges being granted direct access to government funding and the right to confer University of London degrees themselves. This was a major step towards their being recognised generally as de facto universities.

In 1997, Cardiff University (then the University of Wales, Cardiff) was granted degree awarding powers. This was the first time such powers had been granted to a constituent institution of a university (although the University of Wales, Lampeter held degree awarding powers, these were granted prior to it joining the federal university). Over the next decade, all of the constituent institutions of the University of Wales and many of those of the University of London gained their own degree awarding powers.

In 2005, Cardiff University left the University of Wales, which shifted to a confederal structure in 2007 before being essentially dissolved following a series of scandals in 2011. In 2007, Imperial College left the University of London, raising fears about the future of that federal institution. However, it has survived and attracted new members, although many of the larger colleges now award their own degrees. In 2016, City University, London was the first institute to voluntarily surrender university status when it became a college of the University of London.

In 2018, The Guardian reported that hundreds of academics had been accused of bullying students and colleagues, leading to calls from Venki Ramakrishnan, president of the Royal Society, for an overhaul of workplace practices in universities and from Fiona Watt, chair of the Medical Research Council, for an annual national audit of bullying incidents.

=== University funding from 1945 ===
In the years following the end of the Second World War, local education authorities (LEAs) paid some student tuition fees and provided some non-mature students with a maintenance grant. Under the Education Act 1962 a national mandatory award of student maintenance grant was established, payable by the LEAs to students on most full-time courses. In 1980, the level of grant increased from £380 to £1,430.

As the university population rose during the 1980s the sums paid to universities became linked to their performance and efficiency, and by the mid-1990s funding per student had dropped by 40% since the mid-1970s, while numbers of full-time students had reached around 2,000,000 (around a third of the age group), up from around 1,300,000.

In 1989, the levels of maintenance grants were frozen at £2,265 – which since 1985 had been means tested – but a system of student loans was introduced to provide for additional funding. Initially loans of up to £420 were available, and could be taken out by all students. The costs of tuition continued to be met in full for all domestic students.

Following an investigation into the future of universities, the July 1997 report of the National Committee of Inquiry into Higher Education, chaired by the then Sir Ronald (later Lord) Dearing recommended the ending of universal free higher education, and that students should pay £1,000 towards the cost of their tuition fees, which would be recovered in the form of a graduate tax.

Tuition fees were introduced in 1998, raised to £3,000 a year in 2006, and passed £9,000 a year by 2012. At the time of the Dearing Report, tuition fees were still paid in full by the local education authorities, student grants of up to £1,755 (£2,160 in London) were linked to family income, and a subsidised student loan of £1,685 (£2,085 in London) was available. Instead of following Dearing's suggestions, the grant was replaced by the present loan scheme, introduced for students starting in 1998. There was a transition year when about half the previous means-tested grant was available, though they still had to pay the new £1,000 tuition fee. From 1999, the grant was abolished altogether.

The abolition of tuition fees was a major issue in the 1999 Scottish parliamentary elections, and subsequently was part of the agreement that led to the Labour/Liberal Democrats coalition that governed Scotland from 1999 to 2003.

From the academic year 2006/7, a new system of tuition fees was introduced in England. These variable tuition fees of up to £3,000 per year are paid up-front as previously, but new student loans are available that may only be used to pay for tuition fees, and must be repaid after graduation, in addition to the existing loan. In fact, there is very little variation in the tuition fees charged by universities—nearly all charge the maximum tuition fee on all courses. Instead, the differences appear in the nature and value of various 'access' bursaries that are on offer. There has been considerable debate since the 1980s about the tendency toward vocationalism and the decline in the humanities, as well as a growing mindset among senior administrators that is preoccupied with marketing and corporate-like measures of "success."

In 2010, the government voted to raise the amount universities can charge for undergraduate tuition fees (for England only) to between £6,000 – £9,000 per year though most charge the maximum. In 2016, the government raised the cap on tuition fees to £9,250 from 2017. In 2024, the government raised the cap to £9,535 for 2025/26.

In recent years, tuition fees charged from foreign students have become an important source of university income. International fees for a Master's degree typically range from £10,000 to £35,000, with the subject and the university's ranking being the main determinants. In the academic year 2022/23, tuition fees from non-UK students amounted to a total of £11.8 billion across all universities, equal to 46% of all higher education course fees, and nearly 23% of total university income, with some universities earning as much as three quarters of their fees from international students.

== Governance ==
Universities in the United Kingdom do not have a coherent system of funding or governance, and both remain heavily debated. A growing body of other legal rights, for instance, for staff in reasonable expectations of fair procedure, or for students in fairness over the awarding of degrees, has grown through judicial review.

=== Degree awarding powers and university title ===
Both degree awarding powers and university title are controlled under UK law, and it is illegal for an institution to call itself a university or to purport to offer UK degrees without authorisation. Higher education is a devolved power, so the rules for degree awarding powers and university title differ between the four countries of the United Kingdom.

In Scotland and Northern Ireland the last UK national standards (from 1999) still apply. Institutions may hold taught degree awarding powers, allowing them to award ordinary and honours bachelor's degrees and taught master's degrees, and research degree awarding powers, allowing them additionally to award master's degrees by research and doctoral degrees. Institutions with taught degree powers may be awarded the title of "university college", but for university title an institution must hold research degree awarding powers, as well as having over 4,000 full-time equivalent (FTE) students, with over 3,000 on degree -level courses and at least 500 higher education students in each of five broad subject areas. For both degree awarding powers and university title, the final decision is made by the Privy Council on the advice of the Quality Assurance Agency for Higher Education (QAA).

The rules in England and Wales diverged from those in Scotland and Northern Ireland in 2004 and were further modified in 2010 with the introduction of foundation degree awarding powers for further education colleges. Under these regulations, which remain in force in Wales, while taught and research degree awarding powers are awarded indefinitely to institutions in the publicly funded higher education sector, they are time limited to six years for other institutions (e.g. private colleges and universities) after which they must be renewed. The rules for university title allowed institutions holding only taught degree awarding powers to become universities in England and Wales from 2004, and the requirement for minimum student numbers across five broad subject areas was dropped. The overall higher education FTE student number criterion remained at 4,000, with 3,000 on degree-level courses (clarified to include foundation degrees, which has been introduced since the 1999 regulations). The final award of degree awarding powers continued to rest with the Privy Council; for university title it lay with the Privy Council for publicly funded institutions while alternative providers had to get permission to use University in their name under the Companies Act 2006, the recommendation in both cases coming from the Higher Education Funding Council for England (HEFCE) via the relevant government department (in England) or from the Welsh Government.

England diverged from Wales in 2012 with a reduction in the number of higher education FTE students needed for university title to 1,000 (750 on degree level courses), with the addition that at least 55% of total FTE students had to be on higher education courses. There were further technical changes in 2015 before a complete overhaul of the system in England under the Higher Education and Research Act 2017. This saw the abolition of HEFCE and its replacement by the Office for Students (OfS). A new tier of degree awarding powers – bachelor's degree awarding powers, allowing the award of degrees up to level 6 on the Framework for Higher Education Qualifications – was introduced.

Under this act, degree awarding powers were made available on a probationary basis, termed "New DAPs" to providers without a track record in higher education, who had previously had to have a validation agreement with a recognised body to establish a track record prior to gaining their own powers. Providers with a track record of the years or more can apply for time-limited "Full DAPs" and those who have held time-limited date awarding powers for more than three years can apply for "Indefinite DAPs". Another change is that degree awarding powers can now be limited to some subjects rather than covering all possible degrees at that level as previously. There is also an intention to make it possible for institute to gain research degree awarding powers without taught degree awarding powers. New criteria for university title will apply for applications from April 2019, the government had started its intention that student numbers limits will be removed but that the criterion that 55 percent of students are on higher education courses will remain, and that providers with bachelor's degree awarding powers and single subject degree awarding powers will be eligible for university title. The OfS will take over the responsibility of granting degree awarding powers and university title from the Privy Council, and will also be responsible for the awarding of university title to institutions outside of the publicly-funded higher education sector. The act gives OfS the ability to remove indefinite degree awarding powers and university title from any institution in England, including those granted these by royal charter.

=== Staff and student voice ===
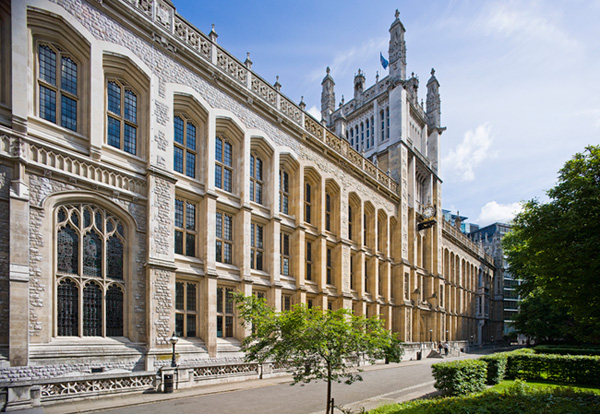
Almost all universities by law require staff and student representation in the governing body. Lack of transparency means many rules, like under the King's College London Act 1997, have not yet been put into practice.

Governance of universities is set by each university's constitution, typically deriving from an Act of Parliament, a royal charter or an Order in Council issued by the Privy Council. The most progressive models support a high degree of voice for staff and students, with the Higher Education Code of Governance stating that:

"There is an expectation, often enshrined within the constitutional documents of HEIs, that governing bodies will contain staff and student members and encourage their full and active participation."

Reforms were first put into law after an Oxford University commission of 1852 stated it must reverse "successive interventions by which the government of the University was reduced to a narrow oligarchy." For example, since the Cambridge University Act 1856 set its rules in law, that university's statutes require that its Regent House (mostly full-time university members) elects its governing body, the 23 member "Council". Four members are elected by heads of colleges, four by professors and readers, eight by other academic fellows, three by students, four by a "grace" (a vote) of the whole Regent House.

In Scotland, the Universities (Scotland) Act 1966, with amendments by the Higher Education Governance (Scotland) Act 2016, contains minimum standards for the composition of courts, with a rector elected by students (but at Edinburgh University, staff also vote) and an elected vice-chairman. Assessors are appointed by the local authority, chancellor, general council and senatus academicus. Also there are student members, employee representatives and co-opted lay members. For instance, Aberdeen University has up to a 22 person "court", with an elected rector and a person she or he chooses, a principal plus one she or he chooses, a vice-principal (five members), two members appointed by the local councils, four members appointed by the General Council, six members from the Senatus Academicus, and up to five co-opted members.

In England and Wales, the pattern is more haphazard and often deficient in representation. The constitution of the London School of Economics, which unusually takes the legal form of a company limited by guarantee, currently requires its seventeen-member "Council" to have two student representatives, and three staff representatives. Anomalously, the King's College London Act 1997 required a 38 member council with five ex-officio members, twenty lay appointees, eight elected by academics, three elected by students, and two by non-academic staff members, however this provision still remains to be put into effect on the "appointed day". Other universities have a broad variety of governance structures, although if there is not a special statute or constitution, the general rules are set by the Education Reform Act 1988. This says that university governing bodies with constitutions issued by the Privy Council should have between 12 and 24 members, with up to thirteen lay members, up to two teachers, up to two students, and between one and nine members co-opted by the others. The wide variations in governing bodies raise the question about staff or student voice should have any limit, given their fundamental expertise in university life.

=== Vice-chancellor ===
The chancellorship of a university is a ceremonial position held by a prominent public figure. The actual executive responsibilities are borne by a vice-chancellor. In recent years, the role of the vice-chancellor has shifted from one of academic administration to strategic management. Accompanying this shift has been a massive rise in remuneration. In 2019, the Office for Students reported that the average basic salary for a university vice chancellor rose ahead of inflation, from £245,000 a year to £253,000 a year, with five heads earning more than £500,000 with benefits and severance payments included.

=== Funding ===
Before 1998, universities were funded mainly by central government, although they have been increasingly reliant on charging students and seeking to raise private capital.

Universities generate income through a variety of means. The largest categories, in order of size, are tuition fees and education contacts (£28.3 billion in 2024/25), research grants and contacts (£7.5 billion), funding body grants (£6.0 billion), investment income (£1.2 billion), and donations and endowments (£1.1 billion). "Othe income" (£9.7 billion), which includes residences and catering operations £2.7 billion), is the second largest category.

Under the Further and Higher Education Act 1992 there were funding councils paid for through general taxation for each of the four nations of the UK: the Higher Education Funding Council for England (HEFCE), Higher Education Funding Council for Wales, the Scottish Funding Council and the Department for Employment and Learning for Northern Ireland. For England and Wales, the Secretary of State appointed 12 to 15 members and the chair, of which 6 to 9 were academics and the remainder had "industrial, commercial or financial" backgrounds. Funds were administered at the councils' discretion but they had to consult with "bodies representing the interests of higher education institutions" such as the University and College Union and Universities UK. Under the Higher Education and Research Act 2017, the English council was replaced by the "Office for Students". There are seven research councils (AHRC, ESRC, MRC, etc.) within UK Research and Innovation (UKRI), which distribute funds after peer review of applications by academics conducting research. UKRI also includes Innovate UK, the national Innovation agency, and Research England, which took over the research component of HEFCE.

Universities can also receive income from charging students tuition fees. Following the Education Act 1962, tuition fees in the UK were effectively abolished and local authorities paid maintenance grants. and this continued through the expansion of university places recommended by the Robbins Report of 1963. However, over the 1980s and 1990s, grants were diminished, requiring students to become ever more reliant on their parents' wealth. In 1997, the Dearing Report recommended the introduction of tuition fees because graduates had "improved employment prospects and pay". Instead of funding university through progressive tax, the Teaching and Higher Education Act 1998 mandated £1,000 fees for home students. In England, this rose to £3,000 following the Higher Education Act 2004 which also enabled the Secretary of State to set fee limits, while universities are meant to ensure fair access by drafting a plan for equality of opportunity. This fee limit was increased to £9,000 after the Browne Review in 2010 and to £9,250 in 2017 where they were later frozen. In 2025 this freeze on tuition fees came to an end and tuition fees have since risen with estimated infusion each academic year. By contrast, under the Scotland Act 1998, the Scottish government resolved not to introduce tuition fees for Scottish students under 25. There is no limit on international students fees. Prior to Brexit, EU students qualified for the same fees as UK students but are now (except for students from Ireland) charged as international students.

A system of student loans is available for UK students through the government owned Student Loans Company. Means-tested grants were previously available until 2016. As the UK is in a minority of countries to still charge tuition fees, increasing demands have been made to abolish fees on the ground that they burden people without wealthy families in debt, deter disadvantaged students from education, and escalate income inequality.

There are four private universities in the United Kingdom (the charitable University of Buckingham, Regent's University London and Richmond American University London, and the for-profit BPP University). The government does not provide any public funding for these universities and they are not subject to the undergraduate tuition fee cap.

=== Other legal rights ===
Rights to other standards go for staff, or students, universities are subject to both judicial review and rights in contract law because they are seen as having both an equally "public" and "private" nature. In a leading case of Clark v University of Lincolnshire and Humberside a student claimed that she should not have received a third class degree after her computer crashed, she lost an assignment, and was forced to rush a new one. The Court of Appeal held that her application for both breach of contract and judicial review should not be struck out because there could be a good case to hear, so long as it did seek to overturn "issues of academic or pastoral judgment" where "any judgment of the courts would be jejune and inappropriate". However, the shorter time limit of three months in judicial review was more appropriate than six years in contract. Cases which have sought to challenge academic judgment for failing students are typically bound to fail, as grading with a fair process is in the bounds of academic judgment. In Buckland v Bournemouth University, where the university management interfered with academic assessment of student grades, this founded a right for a professor to claim he was constructively and unfairly dismissed. All access to education must be free from unlawful discrimination under the Equality Act 2010. In the Higher Education Act 2004 sections 11-21 provides for a modern complaints procedure to be followed in universities.

=== Legal status ===
All UK universities are independent bodies. With the exception of three private for-profit universities, British universities are charities. UK universities have four principal charity regulators. For universities outside England, this is the relevant national regulator: the Charity Commission for England and Wales for Welsh universities; the Office of the Scottish Charity Regulator for Scottish Universities; and the Charity Commission for Northern Ireland for both Northern Irish universities.

In England, most (all but twenty, as of May 2018) higher education institutes are exempt charities that are not registered with the Charity Commission; the principal regulator for universities that are exempt charities is the Office for Students while for those that are not exempt it is the Charity Commission. Both of the two charitable private universities in England are regulated by the Charity Commission.

Universities in the UK have a wide variety of legal structures, leading to differences in their rights and powers, and in who is a member of the corporate body of the university.

The most common form among "old" universities is incorporation by royal charter. The form and objectives of the corporation are laid down in the individual charter and statutes, but commonly all graduates are members of the university. Many London colleges were also incorporated by this route. At the ancient Scottish universities the corporation is formed, under the Universities (Scotland) Act 1889, by the university court rather than the graduates. A chartered corporation may not change its statutes without the approval of the Privy Council.

Newcastle University is the only English university to be purely a statutory corporation, and the only "old" university not incorporated by royal charter, having been created by the Universities of Durham and Newcastle upon Tyne Act 1963. Among London colleges, Royal Holloway, University of London was created in 1985 by the Royal Holloway and Bedford New College Act 1985 (merging the 19th century Royal Holloway and Bedford colleges), and is similarly a statutory corporation. The main difference between this and a chartered corporation is that a statutory corporation has no power to do something that is not aligned with its defined aims and objectives.

Durham and London, while both incorporated by royal charter, have statutes made under Acts of Parliament rather than under their charters (in the case of Durham, this arrangement dates back to its creation by Act of Parliament in 1832, while for London it dates from the university's reconstitution by Act of Parliament in 1900). This makes them both chartered and statutory corporations.

At Oxford and Cambridge, incorporated by a public Act of Parliament in 1571, only graduates who have proceeded to the academic rank of MA are members of the university. Their statues are made under Acts of Parliament, thus they are also considered statutory corporations for some purposes.

Most new universities are Higher Education Corporations, a form of corporation created by the Education Reform Act 1988 to incorporate the polytechnics independently of their local councils. In a higher education corporation, only the governing board is incorporated, not the graduates. Some newer London colleges share this status. Some new universities are companies limited by guarantee, a common form of incorporation used inter alia for some charities. The London School of Economics is also incorporated in this manner. The University of Chester is an unincorporated trust within the Church of England, as was Bishop Grosseteste University up to 2019. This was also the original form of Durham University (at that time also a church university) between its foundation in 1832 and its incorporation by royal charter in 1837.

Under the Education Reform Act 1988, higher education providers will be either recognised bodies or listed bodies. A recognised body is defined as "a university, college or other body which is authorised by Royal Charter or by or under Act of Parliament to grant degrees" or a body authorised by such a body "to act on its behalf in the granting of degrees" (this later category covers the colleges of the University of London with regard to the issuing of London degrees). A listed body is defined as a body which either "provides any course which is in preparation for a degree to be granted by a recognised body and is approved by or on behalf of the recognised body" – independent institutions whose degrees are validated by a recognised body; or "is a constituent college, school or hall or other institution of a university which is a recognised body" – including the colleges of the universities of Oxford, Cambridge, Durham and the Highlands and Islands, the central institutes of the University of London (although not its colleges, which are recognised bodies), Manchester Business School, the university colleges affiliated to Queen's University Belfast (Stranmillis University College and St Mary's University College), and the Royal Welsh College of Music and Drama (part of the University of South Wales).

=== Mergers ===
The first merger between British universities was that between King's College, Aberdeen and Marischal College, Aberdeen under the Universities (Scotland) Act 1858 to form the University of Aberdeen, explicitly maintaining the foundation date of King's College.

In 1984 the New University of Ulster merged with Ulster Polytechnic to form Ulster University. There have also been a number of mergers between colleges of the University of London, of particular note is the merger of Royal Holloway College and Bedford College in 1985 by Act of Parliament.

Cardiff University merged with the University of Wales Institute of Science and Technology in 1984, and then re-merged with the University of Wales College of Medicine in 2004, the two having previously been separated in the 1930s.

Also in 2004, the Victoria University of Manchester and the University of Manchester Institute of Science and Technology merged to form the University of Manchester.

In 2002, London Guildhall University and the University of North London merged to form London Metropolitan University.

At around the same time a merger was proposed between Imperial College London and University College London, but was abandoned following protests.

In 2011, a merger was proposed between two universities in Scotland: University of Abertay Dundee and University of Dundee. This similarly did not occur.

In Wales, the University of Wales Lampeter and Trinity University College merged in 2010 to form the University of Wales, Trinity Saint David, with Swansea Metropolitan University joining in 2012 and the University of Wales committed to joining once it has completed its commitments to current students. Legally this was a takeover rather than a merger as UWTSD remains incorporated under Lampeter's 1828 charter.

Also in Wales, the University of South Wales was formed in 2013 by a merger of the University of Glamorgan and the University of Wales, Newport. The University of Wales Institute Cardiff declined to take part in the merger, becoming Cardiff Metropolitan University.

In 2026, the University of Kent and University of Greenwich merged into the London and South East University Group. Both universities continue to operate as academic trading arms with students applying to and receiving degrees in the name of their respective universities.

Also in 2026 plans were announced for Cranfield University to merge and become a part of King's College London by 2027.

== Categorisation ==
UK universities can be categorised in a number of different ways. Historically, they have frequently been categorised based on age and location, while some more recent categorisations have used statistical techniques such as cluster analysis.

=== Categorisation by age and location ===
One of the earliest attempts to categorise British universities was by George Edwin Maclean in a 1917 report for the US Department of the Interior. This split the universities into five groups based on age, structure and location: ancient universities of England (including Durham as being similar in structure), Scottish universities, the University of London, the "new or provincial universities", and the university colleges (Maclean's report only covered England and Scotland; Wales and Ireland were omitted).

In the early 1950s the University Grants Committee (UGC) divided British universities by age into five groups by age and location. The English universities were divided into three: ancient, Durham and London, and the civic universities, with the other groups being the ancient Scottish universities (then the only universities in Scotland) and the University of Wales (then the only university in Wales). The 1963 Robbins Report split the (then existing) universities into seven categories: the ancient universities of England, the ancient universities of Scotland, the University of London, the older civic universities of England (Maclean's "new or provincial" universities, with the addition of Durham, which at the time took in Newcastle), the University of Wales, the newer civic universities of England (mostly comprising Maclean's university colleges), and the new foundations in England (the plate glass universities).

Watts (1972) expanded this to eight "conventional" categories: Oxbridge, ancient Scottish, London, larger civic (or redbrick), smaller civic (or white tile), Wales and Belfast, new (or plate glass) and technological. Scott (1995) has 12 categories: ancient English, the University of London, the Victorian civic universities, the newer civic universities (which Scott calls "redbrick"), the sui generis universities (which do not fit well into any other classification), the technological universities, Scottish universities, Welsh universities, Northern Irish universities, the Open University, the "old 'new'" (plate glass) universities and the "new 'new'" universities (former polytechnics), along with four categories of colleges (many of which have since become universities): multi-faculty, liberal arts, further/higher education and specialised. This was referred to by Henkel and Little (1999) as "an extraordinary hodge-podge of historical, territorial and functional criteria". Bligh, McNay and Thomas (1999) divided universities more simply into six categories: (Oxford, Cambridge, and St Andrews), other collegiate (Durham, Lancaster and York, with a sub-category for the federal universities of London and Wales), older civic (including Edinburgh, Aberdeen and Glasgow), newer civic (including Newcastle but not Keele), post-war (also explicitly including York and implicitly Lancaster) and post-1992. Watson (2013) updates Scott's (1995) classification, removing the separate categories for Welsh, Scottish and Northern Irish universities and most of the categories of college (retaining only "HE in FE"), and adding "New new new universities" for the colleges that became universities following the Higher Education Act 2004, "Private" (a category defined as, at the time, only containing Buckingham) and "For profit".

The groupings tend to be somewhat fuzzy in definition, with membership of each group varying between different authors. The common categories are:

- Ancient universities, which are normally subdivided geographically into the ancient universities of Scotland and Oxbridge in England.
- The University of London and its constituent colleges, which were founded in London from the early 19th century onwards as non-residential university colleges, following the pattern of the ancient universities of Scotland. Scott notes that it "compris[es] large schools like Imperial College, University College and the London School of Economics, and small specialised institutes". London does not always feature as a stand-alone category: the UGC joined London with Durham, while Bligh, McNay and Thomas put it in with Durham, York, Lancaster and Wales in their 'other collegiate' group.
- Civic universities, often divided into older or larger and younger or smaller, or some similar division. The older or larger civic universities, also known as redbrick universities, were founded in provincial cities as non-residential university colleges in the later 19th and early 20th century. The newer or smaller civic universities, sometimes called "white tile" universities, were founded later. "Redbrick" is sometimes used to mean any university established between 1800 and 1960, or between 1800 and 1992. Scott, unusually, uses "redbrick" to refer to the younger civics universities.
- Plate glass universities were created in the 1960s as residential universities with degree-awarding powers from the start, in contrast to being created as university colleges. The UGC took the decision to create these universities in the late 1950s and early 1960s, prior to the Robbins Report. The Scottish University of Stirling was the only entirely new university created as a result of the Robbins Report, and is often considered (e.g. by Scott) as a Scottish equivalent of the plate glass universities.
- Technological universities were created from the colleges of advanced technology as a result of the recommendations of the 1963 Robbins Report and are thus also known as Robbins expansion universities.
- Old universities refers to institutions that were part of the university sector prior to 1992, including full colleges of the federal universities of London and Wales in 1992.
- New universities or post-1992 universities are institutions that entered the university sector following the passing of the Further and Higher Education Act 1992, including former Polytechnics, colleges and institutes of higher education, and other higher education corporations, but not older university institutions that were part of the university sector as colleges of the universities of London or Wales (e.g., Imperial College or Cardiff University). More recent classifications divide the post-1992 universities into those (mainly former polytechnics) that became universities after the 1992 act and other colleges that became universities after the Higher Education Act 2004.
- Scottish universities, Welsh universities and Northern Irish universities form three of Scott's twelve categories, with the other nine consisting solely of English universities, although he does allow for the Scottish category to be subdivided into ancient, civic, technological, "old 'new'" (plate glass), and "new 'new'" (post-1992). The four Scottish universities founded in the 1960s (covering Scott's sub-categories of civic, technological and "old 'new'") are sometimes termed the Scottish chartered universities.

Some universities are hard to categorise. Durham University is particularly challenging, being treated variously as an ancient university, an older/larger civic or a smaller civic. Maclean, who classified it as "ancient", noted that: "Several Englishmen have been surprised that Durham should be grouped with Oxford and Cambridge, rather than with the newer English universities, since it was founded in 1832. In fact, in its Durham division it is an inchoate Oxford or Cambridge, the third of the ancient universities in England, brought forth after an interval of 700 years as one born out of due time." (Note: p.41) The grouping of Durham and other pre-redbrick universities with the ancient universities may also sometimes be termed "pre-Victorian" or (by analogy to redbrick) "grey brick". Durham is also sometimes classified, on the grounds of age, as a larger or older civic university. Watts, who categorises Durham among the large civic universities, notes that: "Objection … may be made to the inclusion of Durham with the larger civic universities, which is made primarily on age grounds and in spite of the fact that in terms of structure and academic tradition Durham is probably rather closer to Oxbridge. The Robbins Committee (1963) rejected both these arguments and paid more attention to the criterion of size, including Durham with the smaller civic universities". The main report of the Robbins Committee, however, classified Durham as the oldest of the older civic universities. The UGC joined Durham with London to form a separate group between the ancient and civic universities, while others have considered "redbrick" to include London and Durham along with the civic universities, but excluding the technological and plate glass universities from the 1960s. Whyte, in his history of Redbrick universities, considers Durham, along with St David's College, Lampeter as a religiously-exclusive, residential, university institution, following the Oxbridge pattern and separated from the development of the redbrick universities and from the London colleges. Scott classifies Lampeter with the other Welsh universities and Durham as sui generis.

The University of Dundee is similarly sometimes joined with the ancient universities of Scotland. Watts places it here, while noting that "there might … be dispute about the inclusion of Dundee with the ancient Scottish universities". Whyte considered it to be a redbrick university, while Scott considered it to be the only Scottish civic university.

The University of Keele is also categorised by Scott as sui generis on the basis that it was "bravely designed in the 1940s up provide a broad undergraduate education but with an extra-mural twist to reflect its Potteries location". As Durham lies between the ancient and civic universities, Keele lies between the civic and plate glass universities. Watts identifies it among the plate glass universities, but it was a former university college (founded in 1949 and promoted to a university in 1962) not a new institution founded as a university. The Robbins report classified it as newer civic university.

Many categorisations do not include the Open University, the UK's open-access distance learning university at all, while Scott considers it to form its own category of institution. The private University of Buckingham, founded in 1973 and made a university by royal charter in 1983, is not considered by either Scott or by Bligh, McNay and Thomas, but Watson assigns it to a separate category of private universities. The colleges (and now former colleges) of the federal universities of London and Wales are also normally omitted – it is only the parent university that is categorised.

=== Mission groups ===
Location and arms of Russell Group universities

These are actual groupings with defined memberships:

- Russell Group – self-selected association of 24 public research universities.
- MillionPlus – coalition of post-1992 universities
- University Alliance – coalition of "business engaged" (mostly) post-1992 universities.
- Cathedrals Group – coalition of (mostly) new universities with historic links to one or more of the Christian churches.
- Independent Universities Group – private universities.
- Independent Higher Education – private universities and higher education providers.

=== Categorisation by structure ===
- Unitary universities – the standard structure, with all teaching and services provided by the central university. Long standard in Scotland, the first unitary university in England was Birmingham in 1900.
- Examining Board universities – modelled on the separation of teaching in college and examination by the Senate House in the University of Cambridge, the University of London (1836–1900) and the Royal University of Ireland (1880–1909) were set up to function purely as examining boards; there are no current universities in this category.
- Federal universities – Starting with the Queen's University of Ireland (1850–1880) a number of universities have been federal in nature, including the Victoria University (1880–1904), the University of Wales (1893–2007), Durham University (1909–1963) and the Federal University of Surrey (2000–2004); the only current federal universities in the UK are the University of London (from 1900) and the University of the Highlands and Islands (from 2011).
- Collegiate universities – the classical Oxbridge model of a university containing a number of colleges. In addition to Oxford and Cambridge, this has been adopted by Durham, York, and Lancaster, although these differ from the Oxbridge model in that there is no teaching in their colleges. The University of Roehampton and the University of the Arts London are also collegiate, with teaching taking place in academic departments associated with the colleges. Federal universities are also sometimes referred to as collegiate.

=== Statistical categorisation ===
Research by Vikki Boliver in 2015 used cluster analysis to divide UK universities into four clusters based on how elite they were using data on academic selectivity, research activity, teaching quality, socio-economic exclusivity and economic resources. The first cluster consisted of only Oxford and Cambridge. The second cluster contained the remaining universities from the Russell Group along with the former members of the defunct 1994 Group (except for the University of Essex), all of the pre-1992 universities in Scotland, and the University of Kent. The third cluster was the remaining pre-1992 universities (with the exception of the University of Wales Trinity Saint David (UWTSD), which is technically pre-1992 as it operates under the University of Wales, Lampeter's 1828 Royal Charter), many of the former polytechnics and central institutions, and a few former HE colleges that became university colleges and then universities after the polytechnics. The fourth cluster has the remaining polytechnics and the majority of the former HE colleges, along with UWTSD.

Research England carried out a cluster analysis of English universities in 2018 as part of is preparation for the Knowledge Exchange Framework. This used three key dimensions: existing knowledge base, knowledge generation and physical assets. Ninety nine broad-discipline institutions were classified using the cluster analysis, with heuristics (and in one case manual intervention) being used to identify specialist institutions based on concentration of academics; these were manually assigned by field of specialisation to STEM (subdivided into biosciences and veterinary (5 institutions), engineering (1 institution), and agriculture (3 institutions)), social sciences and business (5 institutions), and arts and design (18 institutions). The cluster analysis identified five clusters, randomly assigned labels to avoid implying any ranking of which cluster was "better". The key characteristics of the clusters were:

- Cluster E (29 institutions): "Large universities with broad discipline portfolio across both STEM and non-STEM generating a mid-level amount of world-leading research across all disciplines. Significant amount of research funded by gov't bodies/hospitals; 9.5% from industry. Large proportion of part-time undergraduate students, and small postgraduate population dominated by taught postgraduates."
- Cluster J (17 institutions): "Mid-sized universities with limited funded research activity and generating limited world-leading research. Academic activity across STEM and non-STEM including other health, computer sciences, architecture/planning, social sciences and business, humanities, arts and design. Research activity funded largely by government bodies/hospitals; 13.7% from industry."
- Cluster M (17 institutions): "Small universities with limited funded research activity and generating limited world-leading research. Academic activity across disciplines, particularly in other health domains and non-STEM. Much of research activity funded by gov't bodies/hospitals; 14.7% from industry."
- Cluster V (16 institutions): "Very large, very high research intensive and broad-discipline universities undertaking significant amounts of world-leading research. Research funded by range of sources incl. RCs, gov't bodies, charities and 10.2% from industry. Discipline portfolio: significant activity in clinical medicine and STEM. Student body includes significant numbers of taught and research postgraduates."
- Cluster X (20 institutions): "Large, high research intensive and broad-discipline universities undertaking a significant amount of world-leading research. Much of research funded by RCs and gov't bodies; 8.5% from industry. Discipline portfolio balanced across STEM and non-STEM with less or no clinical medicine activity. Large proportion of taught postgraduates in student population."

Summary of assignment of universities to different clusters
Boliver (2015)	Research England (2018)						
Boliver (2015)	Cluster E	Cluster J	Cluster M	Cluster V	Cluster X	Specialist	Not included
Cluster 1	–	–	–	Cambridge; Oxford	–	–	–
Cluster 2	Goldsmiths	–	–	Birmingham; Bristol; Imperial; KCL; Leeds; Liverpool; Manchester; Newcastle; Nottingham; QMUL; Sheffield; Southampton; UCL; Warwick	Bath; Durham; UEA; Exeter; Kent; Lancaster; Leicester; LSE; Loughborough; Reading; RHUL; SOAS; Surrey; Sussex; York	–	Aberdeen; Cardiff; Dundee; Edinburgh; Glasgow; Heriot-Watt; QUB
Cluster 3	Aston; Bedfordshire; Bournemouth; Bradford; Brighton; UCLan; City; Coventry; De Montfort; East London; Greenwich; Hertfordshire; Huddersfield; Kingston; Lincoln; Liverpool John Moores; Manchester Met; Middlesex; Northumbria; Nottingham Trent; Oxford Brookes; Plymouth; Portsmouth; Salford; Sheffield Hallam; UWE Bristol; Westminster	Birmingham City; Chester; Canterbury Christ Church; Derby; Gloucestershire; Leeds Beckett; London South Bank; Northampton; Roehampton; Staffordshire; Sunderland; Teesside; Worcester	Bath Spa; Chichester; Falmouth; Newman; West London; Winchester	–	Brunel; Essex; Hull; Keele	Arts Bournemouth; Arts London; Creative Arts; Harper Adams	Abertay Dundee; Aberystwyth; Bangor; Cardiff Met; Edinburgh Napier; Glamorgan;^{‡} Glasgow Caledonian; Highlands and Islands; Queen Margaret; Robert Gordon; Stirling; Swansea; Ulster; West of Scotland
Cluster 4	Anglia Ruskin	Bolton; London Met; Wolverhampton	Bucks New; Cumbria; Edge Hill; Leeds Trinity; Liverpool Hope; St Mark and St John; Solent; Suffolk; York St John	–	–	UC Birmingham; Bishop Grosseteste	Wrexham Glyndwr; Newport;^{‡} UWTSD
Not included	Open	–	Buckingham; St Mary Twickenham	–	Birkbeck	ICR; Conservatoire for Dance and Drama; Courtauld; Cranfield; Guildhall; Heythrop;^{†} Leeds Art; Liverpool Performing Arts; Liverpool Tropical Medicine; LBS; LSHTM; NFTS; Norwich Art; Plymouth Art; Ravensbourne; RAC; RAM; RCA; RCM; RCSSD; RNCM; RVC; SGUL; Trinity Laban; Writtle	–
^{‡}Now part of the University of South Wales^{†}Closed

== Employment in higher education ==
In December 2018, nearly 440,000 people worked in the higher education sector. According to research by the University and College Union, in 2019/20 around 220,000 academic staff were employed in UK higher education institutions; a third of these were on fixed-term contracts. In 2022, there were 240,420 employed in the sector.

== Admission ==
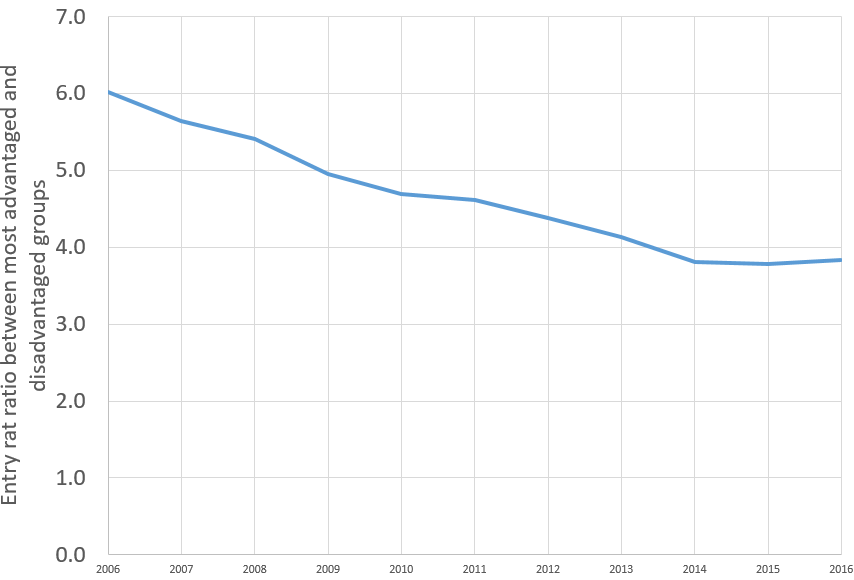
Entry rate ratio for the most advantaged to most disadvantaged groups between 2006 and 2016, showing the decrease in the ratio

The universities in the United Kingdom (with the exception of The Open University) share an undergraduate admission system operated by UCAS. Applications are normally made during the final year of secondary school, prior to students receiving their final results, with schools providing predicted grades for their students. Applications should be made by 15 January to the majority of undergraduate courses, but by 15 October for admissions to most courses in medicine, dentistry and veterinary science, and for all courses at the universities of Oxford and Cambridge. Some art and design courses have a later deadline of 24 March. Applications received up to 30 June are sent to universities, after this date they go straight into Clearing. Offers are made by early May for applications received by 15 January and by mid July for applications received by 30 June. Applicants who apply late, do not receive or accept any offers, or who do not meet the conditions of their offer, go into Clearing, which opens in early July although it is busiest directly after A-level results are announced. Most UK providers advertise courses they have not filled during the standard application period through Clearing.

Around half of British universities had one or more courses that require an entrance examination as of 2012 in addition to secondary school qualifications. These include many medicine and dentistry courses as well as popular courses in law and mathematics. Some highly competitive courses also require students to attend an interview or audition.

Many universities now operate the Credit Accumulation and Transfer Scheme (CATS) and all universities in Scotland use the Scottish Credit and Qualifications Framework (SCQF) enabling easier transfer between courses and institutions.

== Reputation ==
British higher education has a strong international reputation, with over half of international students citing this as one of the main factors in deciding to study in the UK (compared to 22 percent of international students studying in Canada, 21 percent in Australia and 15 percent in the US). London has also been ranked as the best city in the world for students. However, a number of universities, including Cambridge, UCL and the LSE, have warned that Brexit poses a reputational risk for UK universities, and there are also fears about the impact of the government's immigration and visa policy.

Domestic rankings of universities in the UK were first introduced in 1993 by The Times Good University Guide. Today, there are three main domestic league tables published by The Times and Sunday Times, The Guardian, and the Complete University Guide. Each year since 2008, Times Higher Education has compiled a "Table of Tables" to combine the results of the three mainstream league tables. In the 2018 table, the top-five universities were the University of Cambridge, University of Oxford, University of St Andrews, Imperial College London and Durham University.

In the 2020 Times Higher Education World University Rankings, Oxford was placed first, Cambridge third, and Imperial tenth; while the 2020 top fifty also included UCL at fifteenth, LSE at 27th, Edinburgh at 30th, and King's College London at 36th. A further four UK universities (eleven in total) rank in the top 100. Oxford, Cambridge and Imperial have been consistently ranked in the top ten on this table. (Note: THE tables are available online from the 2010–2011 ranking; Oxford, Cambridge and Imperial make the top 10 in all of them.)

In the QS World University Rankings, Oxford (fourth in 2020), Cambridge (seventh), UCL (eighth), and Imperial (ninth) are consistently present in the top ten. (Note: Tables are (as of 2020) freely available online from 2012, these four institutes make the top ten in all previous tables.) Edinburgh (20th), Manchester (27th), King's College London (33rd), LSE (44th), and Bristol (49th) also make the top fifty and a further nine UK universities (eighteen total) make the top 100.

The Academic Ranking of World Universities also places Cambridge (third in 2019) and Oxford (seventh) consistently in the world top ten. (Note: Tables go back to 2003.) University College London (15th), Imperial College London (23rd), the University of Edinburgh (31st), and the University of Manchester (33rd) also make the top 50 and two more UK universities (eight total) are in the top 100.

In specific subject rankings, UK universities have performed well with a quarter of all top rankings taken by British Universities in the QS 2017 rankings. The University of Oxford is rated top in most subjects among British universities, with the Royal College of Art first in the world for art and design, the Institute of Education, part of University College London, for education, University of Sussex for Development Studies and Loughborough University for sports-related subjects.

In August 2019, the New Statesman magazine published a cover story, later reprinted by The Week, arguing that British universities have suffered from decades of grade inflation, and from a set of perverse incentives imposed by successive governments: "An elite university education has been sold to successive generations of students. An emaciated, grossly expanded education has been delivered."

== Peculiarities ==
In England and Wales the majority of young full-time university students live away from home, which is not the case for universities in some, mainly Southern European, countries such as Italy and Spain. Most universities in the United Kingdom provide (or at least help organise) rented accommodation for many of their students, particularly in the first year; some British universities provide accommodation for the full duration of their courses. As a result, the lifestyle of university students in the United Kingdom can be quite different from those of some European universities where the majority of students live at home with their parents. The introduction of university fees paid by students from 2006 onwards has led many English and Welsh students to apply to institutions closer to their family's homes to reduce the additional costs of moving and living farther away.

The University of London from its reform in 1900, and the University of Wales from its inception in 1893 until its reform in 2007, have been federal universities. They have a central governing body with overall responsibility for the maintenance of standards at the constituent colleges. Recently, however, there has been considerable pressure from the larger colleges to become more autonomous and, in some cases, completely independent institutions. Examples of this were the secession of Imperial College London from the University of London and Cardiff University leaving the University of Wales. Cardiff's departure and policies pursued by the Welsh Government have led to the break-up of the University of Wales, which is in the process of merging with the University of Wales Trinity Saint David, with an expected completion date of 2017.

The London School of Economics (a college of the University of London) was founded as a company registered at Companies House, having no royal charter or founding Act of Parliament. The University of Buckingham was the only private university in the UK until 2012.

Two universities, Bishop Grosseteste University in Lincoln and the University of Chester, are unincorporated trusts under the trusteeship of their local Church of England dioceses.

The University of Warwick, originally to be named the University of Warwickshire when it was established in 1965, is several miles from Warwick, the county town, and is situated on the southern edge of Coventry in the West Midlands county. Following the county boundary changes, Warwick University's campus straddles the Warwickshire and city of Coventry boundary, although many of its students live in the nearby towns of Kenilworth and Leamington Spa, Warwickshire.

John Banks Jenkinson was petitioner for the royal charters of both the University of Wales Trinity Saint David (granted in 1828) and Durham University (granted in 1837), as Bishop of St David's and Dean of Durham.

== Post-nominal abbreviations ==
In common with practice worldwide, graduates of universities in the United Kingdom often place not only their academic qualifications but also the names of the universities that awarded them after their name, the university typically (but not universally) being placed in parentheses, thus: John Smith, Esq, BSc (Sheffield), or John Smith BSc Sheffield. Degrees are generally listed in ascending order of seniority followed by diplomas. An exception may be made when a degree of a different university falls between two degrees of the same university: John Smith, MSci (York), PhD (London); Jane Smoth BA, PhD (London), MA (Bristol).

Some older British universities are regularly denoted by an abbreviation of their Latin name. Notably Oxon, Cantab, Dunelm are used for the Universities of Oxford, Cambridge and Durham, which are different from the English abbreviation. For other universities, such as St And for St Andrews, Glas for Glasgow, Aberd for Aberdeen, Edin for Edinburgh or Lond for University of London, the Latin and English abbreviations are identical (both Aberdon and Londin are used occasionally, making the Latin explicit). More recently established universities also sometimes use Latin abbreviations, especially when they share the name of an episcopal see, in which case they sometimes use the same abbreviation that the bishop uses for his signature.

On 30 March 2007 the University of Oxford issued a document entitled "Oxford University Calendar: Notes on Style", which promulgated a new system of abbreviations for use in publications of that university. The general rule is to use the first syllable and the first letter of the second syllable. Thus Oxford and Cambridge became 'Oxf' and 'Camb'. The change was controversial (p. 2, n. 1) but was considered essential to preserve consistency since most of the United Kingdom's universities can be rendered only in English. This document also counsels against the use of parentheses.

Abbreviations of universities and other degree-awarding bodies
Latin abbreviation	English abbreviation	Latin name	English name	Notes
Aberd		Aberdonensis	University of Aberdeen	
–	Aber Dund		Abertay University, Dundee	
–	Ang Rus		Anglia Ruskin University	
–	Arden		Arden University	
–	Aston		Aston University	
–	Arts Lond		University of the Arts London	
–	Bedf		University of Bedfordshire	
–	Belf or QUB		Queen's University Belfast	
Birkbeck		Collegium Birkbeck Londiniense	Birkbeck, University of London	
	or BBK	Collegium Birkbeck Londiniense	Birkbeck, University of London	
Birm		Birminghamiensis	University of Birmingham	
	or B'ham	Birminghamiensis	University of Birmingham	
–	Birm City		Birmingham City University	
–	Bourne		University of Bournemouth	
Brad		Bradfordiensis	University of Bradford	
–	Brigh		University of Brighton	
Bris		Bristoliensis	University of Bristol	
–	Brun		Brunel University of London	
–	Buck		University of Buckingham	
Cantab	Camb	Cantabrigiensis	University of Cambridge	
–	Cant Univ		Canterbury Christ Church University	
Cantuar	Lambeth	Cantuariensis	Archbishop of Canterbury's degrees, also known as Lambeth degrees	Cantuar is also used by University of Canterbury, NZ; Oxford style guide recommends (unlike university degrees) the use of the Latin abbreviation for Lambeth degrees.
–	Card		Cardiff University	
–	Cen Lancs or UCLan		University of Central Lancashire	
–	Ches	Cestrensis	University of Chester	
Cicest	Chich	Cicestensis	University of Chichester	Use of Cicest for Chichester is rare
–	City Lond		City, University of London	
–	Cov		Coventry University	
–	Cran		Cranfield University	
–	UCA		University for the Creative Arts	
Cumb		Cumbriensis or Cumbriae	University of Cumbria	
–	De Mont		De Montfort University	
Dund		Dundensis	University of Dundee	
Dunelm	Durh	Dunelmensis	Durham University	Both abbreviations in use from mid 19th century
–	East Ang or UEA		University of East Anglia	
–	East Lond or UEL		University of East London	
Edin		Edinburgensis	University of Edinburgh	
Exon	Exe	Exoniensis	University of Exeter	
	Fal		Falmouth University	
–	Glam		University of Glamorgan	Now part of the University of South Wales
Glas		Glasguensis	University of Glasgow	
–	Glas Cal		Glasgow Caledonian University	
–	Glouc		University of Gloucestershire	
–	Greenw		University of Greenwich	
–	GSMD		Guildhall School of Music and Drama	
–	H-W		Heriot-Watt University	
–	Herts		University of Hertfordshire	
–	Hudd		University of Huddersfield	
–	Imp or Imp Lond		Imperial College London	
–	IOE Lond		Institute of Education, London	Now part of UCL
Cantuar (Note: "Profile: Prof Lance Pettitt BA (Cantaur)[sic] MA PhD (NUI Dublin)". St Mary's University, Twickenham. – according to his CV, Prof. Pettitt earned his BA at Kent)	– (Kent)	Cantuariensis (= Canterbury) or Cantiensis	University of Kent	Use of Cantuar for Kent is rare and risks confusion with both Lambeth degrees and the University of Canterbury, NZ. The Latin name for Kent is Cantium (hence Cantiensis) which would give Cant (also used by the University of Canterbury, NZ); the University of Kent was originally the University of Kent at Canterbury.
–	KCL	Collegium Regium apud Londinenses	King's College London	For pre-2008 award, use University of London's post nominal abbreviation. Certain period from 2008 allowed respective graduates to choose from the two awarding bodies.
Lanc		Lancastriensis	University of Lancaster	
–	ULaw	Collegium iurisprudentiae	University of Law	Previously known as The College of Law
–	Leeds Met		Leeds Beckett University	Used to be referred to as Leeds Metropolitan
Leic		Leicestriensis	University of Leicester	
Linc		Lincolniensis	University of Lincoln	
Liv,		Liverpolis	University of Liverpool	
	Lpool or L'pool	Liverpolis	University of Liverpool	
–	Liv Hope		Liverpool Hope University	
–	Liv J Moores		Liverpool John Moores University	
Lond		Londiniensis or Londinensis	University of London	The Bishop of London uses Londin in his signature
or Londin		Londiniensis or Londinensis	University of London	The Bishop of London uses Londin in his signature
–	Lond Met		London Metropolitan University	
–	LSE		London School of Economics and Political Science	For pre-2008 award, use University of London's post nominal abbreviation.
–	LSHTM		London School of Hygiene & Tropical Medicine	
–	Lond SB		London South Bank University	
–	Lough or Lboro		Loughborough University	
Manc		Mancuniensis	University of Manchester	
–	Manc Met		Manchester Metropolitan University	
–	Middx		University of Middlesex	
–	Newc or Ncle		Newcastle University	Both also used by the University of Newcastle.
–	North Lond		University of North London	
–	N'ton		University of Northampton	
–	N'ria		University of Northumbria	
–	Nott		University of Nottingham	
–	Nott Trent		Nottingham Trent University	
–	Open		The Open University	
Oxon	Oxf	Oxoniensis	University of Oxford	
–	Oxf Brookes		Oxford Brookes University	
–	Plym		University of Plymouth	
–	Port		University of Portsmouth	
–	Qu Marg or QMU		Queen Margaret University	
–	QMUL		Queen Mary, University of London	For pre-2013 award, use University of London's post nominal abbreviation. From 2013, transition period applies. For medical degrees, Lond is still used.
–	R'dg or Rdg		University of Reading	
–	Robt Gor		Robert Gordon University	
–	Roeh		University of Roehampton	
–	RAM		Royal Academy of Music	
–	RCA		Royal College of Art	
–	RCM		Royal College of Music	
–	RHUL		Royal Holloway, University of London	
–	RVM		Royal Veterinary College	
St And		Sancti Andreae	University of St Andrews	
–	Salf		Salford University	
–	SOAS		School of Oriental and African Studies	For pre-December-2013 award, use University of London's post nominal abbreviation.
–	Sheff		University of Sheffield	
–	Sheff Hallam		Sheffield Hallam University	
Soton	S'ton	Sotoniensis	University of Southampton	
–	S'ton Sol		Solent University	
–	Staffs		University of Staffordshire	
–	Stir		University of Stirling	
–	Strath		University of Strathclyde	
–	Sund		University of Sunderland	
–	Sur		University of Surrey	
–	Sus		University of Sussex	
–	Tees		Teesside University	
–	Thames V		Thames Valley University	Now the University of West London
–	UCL		University College London	For pre-2005 awarded degrees, use University of London's post nominal abbreviation. Note further that from 2005, a transition period applies. For medical degrees, Lond is also used.
–	Wales	Cambrensis	University of Wales	Camb for Cambrensis would risk confusion with Cambridge. The Oxford Calendar style guide gives "Wales" as the abbreviation for Wales.
–	Warw	Warwickensis	University of Warwick	
–	West Eng or UWE		University of the West of England	
–	West Sco		University of the West of Scotland	
–	Westmin		University of Westminster	
Winton	Winc	Wintoniensis	University of Winchester	
–	Wolv		University of Wolverhampton	
–	Worc	Wigorniensis	University of Worcester	
Ebor	– (York)	Eboracensis	University of York	York (not actually an abbreviation) is also used by York University (Canada)

== Value of academic degrees ==
A study by the Sutton Trust in 2015 found that, after taking student loan repayments into account, a higher apprenticeship (at level 5 in the national qualifications frameworks) delivered higher lifetime earnings on average than a degree from a non-Russell Group university. Despite this, polling for the report found that apprenticeships have a lower perceived value than degrees.

The Institute for Fiscal Studies has found that, after controlling for differences in student characteristics, graduates in medicine and economics earn (on average) 20% more and graduates in business, computing and architecture 10% more than average graduates, while graduates in creative arts earn 15% less. It also found that there is a wide variation in graduate earnings within subjects, even between graduates with the same degree from the same institution. One reason for this variation is the wealth of graduates' family backgrounds, but subject and institution choice as well as prior education attainment level can be a more significant determinant.

A 2017 study by the Office for National Statistics found that, although university graduates are consistently more likely to be employed than non-graduates, they are increasingly likely to be overqualified for the jobs which they do hold. In peak earning years, a university graduate will earn an average of £36,000 per year, an apprentice will earn £30,000 per year, an A-level graduate will earn £24,000 per year, while someone without an A-level will earn £20,000 per year. Breaking down the university degrees into separate professions, undergraduates in engineering or medicine earn the most at £44,500 per year, while undergraduates in the arts earn the least at £20,700 per year. Finally, Russell Group graduates hold 61% of all jobs that require a university degree, despite being only 17% of all higher education graduates.

The Intergenerational Foundation found in a 2018 paper that the "graduate premium" had fallen to around £100,000 averaged across all subjects, degree classes and universities, although with such a wide variation by subject and institution that it was impossible to quantify in a meaningful way. They argue that the graduate premium has been diluted by the large number of graduates, in particular those with non-vocational degrees from non-elite institutions. Making matters worse, employers have responded to the oversupply of graduates by raising the academic requirements of many occupations higher than is really necessary to perform the work. Further study of the graduate premium by the Higher Education Statistics Agency and Warwick University shows that, while graduates born in 1970 earned 19% more than their non-graduate peers, the premium has fallen to 11% for graduates born in 1990.

In a 2018 study, the National Audit Office reported that, although some progress has been made in increasing STEM subject enrollment since 2011, the progress does not match labour market demand. For example, too many students are seeking a degree in the biological sciences, while the shortage in STEM apprentices has seen little improvement. In particular, women have shown scant interest in acquiring high-demand skills such as a computer science degree.

A 2018 study by the Office for National Statistics found that one in eight young people without degree-level qualifications are working in graduate jobs. Most of these jobs are in sales, human resources, and retail and wholesale management. In these fields, on-the-job training can be an effective substitute for formal qualifications.

A 2020 study by the Department for Education found that the median annual earnings of university graduates, five years into their careers, ranged from £20,800 in the creative arts and design to £49,450 in medicine and dentistry.

== Academic standards ==
Concern exists about possible grade inflation. It is claimed that academics are under increasing pressure from administrators to award students good marks and grades with little regard for those students' actual abilities, in order to maintain their league table rankings. The percentage of graduates who receive a First has grown from 7% in 1997 to 26% in 2017, with the rate of growth sharply accelerating toward the end of this period. A 2018 study by the UK Standing Committee for Quality Assessment concluded that improvements in faculty skill and student motivation are only two of many factors driving average grades upward, that grade inflation is real, that the British undergraduate degree classifications will become less useful to students and employers, and that inflation will undermine public confidence in the overall value of higher education. Many students believe that a First or upper Second, by itself, is no longer sufficient to secure a good job, and that their CVs must include additional experiences, such as extracurricular activity, to remain competitive.

The Quality Assurance Agency (QAA) regularly reviews all UK universities to ensure standards are maintained. It is also responsible for producing subject benchmark statements and descriptions of the different degree levels (foundation, bachelor's master's and doctorates). The QAA also certifies that British degrees (with the exception of Oxbridge MAs, which it does not consider to be academic degrees) meet the level descriptors for the Bologna process, with the caveat that initial medical degrees are at master's level but retain the name of bachelor's degrees for historical reasons and that similarly the MAs of "a small number of universities" in Scotland are at bachelor's level. In some subjects (particularly those with associated chartered status), professional bodies also accredit degrees, e.g. the Institute of Physics accredits physics degrees.

== University life ==
=== Sport ===
Sport is a major part of university life for students, consisting of intramural sport, varsity matches against rival universities, and inter-university competitions organised by British Universities and Colleges Sport (BUCS). The latter have been described as "one of the most well rounded and developed university sport programmes in the world". In addition, Scottish Student Sport runs over 100 events each year for universities in Scotland including the annual multi-sport Scottish Student Games. Students at universities in Northern Ireland can also participate in Student Sport Ireland events.

=== Students' unions ===
Students' unions emerged in the late 19th century, although the Cambridge Union, Oxford Union and Durham Union, which are debating societies, date back to the early 19th century. Students' unions advocate for student rights, organise events, and provide support services.

== See also ==
- Post-1992 university
- Academic ranks in the United Kingdom
- Armorial of UK universities
- Colleges within universities in the United Kingdom
- Education and Skills Funding Agency
- Jisc (previously the Joint Information Systems Committee)
- List of universities in the United Kingdom
- Rankings of universities in the United Kingdom
- Tuition fees in the United Kingdom
