= Office for Students =

Public body in higher education in England

Agency overview
- Formed: 1 January 2018
- Preceding agencies: Higher Education Funding Council for England, Office for Fair Access; Universities Funding Council, Polytechnics and Colleges Funding Council (1988–92)
- Type: Non-departmental public body
- Jurisdiction: England
- Headquarters: Bristol; London
- Employees: 475 (2024/25)
- Minister responsible: Minister of State for Skills
- Agency executives: Edward Peck, Chair; Ruth Hannant and Polly Payne, Joint Chief Executives
- Parent department: Department for Education
- Website: www.officeforstudents.org.uk

- Applies to: England
- Relates to: Higher education

Other UK counterparts
- Northern Ireland: Department for the Economy
- Scotland: Scottish Funding Council
- Wales: Medr

The Office for Students (OfS) is a non-departmental public body of the Department for Education of the United Kingdom Government. It acts as the regulator and competition authority for the higher education sector in England.

== History ==
The regulator was established by the Higher Education and Research Act 2017, coming into existence on 1 January 2018. It merged the Higher Education Funding Council for England and the Office for Fair Access, and formally inherited their responsibilities, while 'working in the interests of students and prospective students' and having 'a wider remit ... taking charge of the granting of degree awarding powers and university title.' The OfS inherited HEFCE's funding responsibilities (aside from those for research which passed to United Kingdom Research and Innovation), and OFFA's responsibility for promoting fair access to higher education.

The appointment of Toby Young to the board, announced on 1 January 2018, generated controversy over his suitability for the post. As at 8 January 2018, over 200,000 people had signed an online petition protesting his appointment. In response to questioning, Prime Minister Theresa May declared herself comfortable with his appointment, while the Universities minister defended him in the House of Commons. After criticism from leading Tory MPs, Young resigned on that day, claiming he had been turned into a caricature.

In February 2021, James Wharton, Baron Wharton of Yarm, a Conservative peer, was made the chair and his appointment was endorsed by the Education Select Committee. Shadow Education Secretary Kate Green questioned his experience and suitability for the role, calling his appointment "cronyism". Although it is customary for chairs of independent bodies to resign political affiliations during their period of office, Wharton chose not to resign from the Conservative whip. Wharton resigned in July 2024, following Labour's win in the 2024 United Kingdom general election, prior to the end of his term of office.

== Operations and structure ==
The OfS website lists its main areas of work as:

1. Helping students to get into and succeed in higher education.
2. Helping students stay informed.
3. Making sure that students get a high-quality education that prepares them for the future.
4. Protecting students’ interests.

It notes that it is not responsible for tuition fees, students loans or other aspects of individual student funding, and that it cannot usually get involved in individual complaints about universities and colleges.

The OfS's other functions include the administration of the Teaching Excellence Framework and the Register of higher education providers. It is responsible both for administering the prevent duty and for ensuring that universities allow freedom of speech for controversial guest speakers.

=== Leadership ===
The OfS is governed by a board consisting of the chair, the Chief Executive, the Director for Fair Access and Participation, and at least seven and not more than twelve other members. All members of the board are appointed by the Secretary of State for Education. The OfS chair from 2021 to 2024 was Conservative peer James Wharton, who resigned following the 2024 General Election, and since July 2025 has been Edward Peck. Ruth Hannant and Polly Payne were appointed as joint chief executives with effect from 15 June 2026.

The board is advised by a Student Panel, which exists to help the OfS to understand students' views and perspectives.

=== Accountable officers in education providers ===
Registered higher education providers must nominate an accountable officer to the OfS. This is normally the chief executive of the provider, but may be the senior officer responsible for higher education in a provider that also carries out other activities not related to higher education. The accountable officer reports on the provider's behalf to the OfS, the designated data body and the designated quality body. They are personally responsible for funding received from the OfS and Research England and for the loans received from the Student Loans Company on behalf of the provider's students for payment of tuition fees. They can be required to appear before the Public Accounts Committee alongside the head of the OfS to answer questions about the registration and funding of the provider.

== Legal actions and external performance review ==
In 2019, the Office for Students refused the Bloomsbury Institute's application for registration as a higher education provider, meaning that its students could not apply for student loans.The Office for Students gave the reasons as concerns about the drop-out rate and graduate employment rate. The director of the Office for Students was reported as saying that this decision was '"completely unprecedented" adding that the reputational consequences are "quite severe"'. In August 2020, the Court of Appeal overturned the decision not to include Bloomsbury Institute on the register of providers and ordered the OfS to reconsider Bloomsbury's application.

In March 2023, the House of Lords Industry and Regulators Committee opened an inquiry into the work of the OfS to scrutinise its performance, its independence from and relationship with the Government and whether it had the necessary expertise and resources to carry out its functions. The inquiry also examined the OfS’ work in relation to the financial sustainability of the higher education sector, and how the associated risks were being managed. The final report criticised the OfS for not engaging with education providers and students suitably, and said that when it did "there is a perception that it gives insufficient attention to their feedback". It also said that the OfS's approach to its regulatory duties "often seems arbitrary, overly controlling and unnecessarily combative" and that "there have been too many examples of the OfS acting like an instrument of the Government’s policy agenda rather than an independent regulator", concluding that the OfS had "a lot of work to do" to improve its independence.

In March 2025, the Office for Students fined the University of Sussex a record £585,000 for failing to uphold freedom of speech, in particular in relation to its trans and non-binary equality policy, following a three year investigation after the resignation of Kathleen Stock. The fine was overturned following a judicial review in April 2026, which found that the result of the OfS's investigation "was vitiated by bias because the OfS approached the decision with a closed mind and had therefore unlawfully predetermined the decision" and that the OfS had mis-applied the concepts of freedom of speech and academic freedom as well as exceeding its regulatory powers.

== See also ==
- Research Councils UK
- Higher Education Funding Council for Wales
- Higher Education Statistics Agency (based in Cheltenham)
- UCAS
- Jisc
- Research Excellence Framework
- Teaching Excellence Framework
