= Cyber-SHIP Lab =

University maritime cyber security research project

- Motto: Securing Maritime
- Type: Research and Development
- Established: 2019
- Parent institution: University of Plymouth
- Pricinipal Investigator: Professor Kevin Jones
- Academic staff: 11
- Location: Plymouth, Devon, England
- Website: https://www.plymouth.ac.uk/research/cyber-ship-lab

Cyber-SHIP Lab, situated at the University of Plymouth, is a research facility dedicated to researching and address cybersecurity threats in the maritime industry. Professor Kevin Jones is the Deputy Vice-Chancellor for Research and Innovation at the university and Principal Investigator at the lab.

The lab is able to create realistic physical twins of networks of ship equipment to test for vulnerabilities against maritime control systems. The lab works with industry to ensure the security of shipping infrastructure.

== History ==
The Cyber-SHIP Lab was founded in 2019 as a collaborative initiative between the University of Plymouth and industry partners. It was funded by Research England. The lab was initially given three years funding which expired in 2022. The lab cost £3 million to construct.

In 2021, the lab partnered with the Royal Navy on marine-tech projects including the Project Hecla, originally started in 2018.

In 2023 and 2024, the lab co-organised a symposium on maritime cybersecurity and resilience along with the International Maritime Organization. The event was held in London. The lab continued to organise events in 2026, partnering with the Canadian Department of National Defence to run training courses.
