= Ruth Hannant =

British higher education officer

Ruth Léonie Hannant C.B. is a British public servant, who previously held senior roles in the UK Civil Service and is now (with Polly Payne) the joint chief executive officer of the Office for Students, the independent regulator of higher education in England.

== Education ==
Hannant studied history as an undergraduate at Gonville and Caius College, Cambridge, before joining the Civil Service in 1996.

== Civil Service career ==
From 2010 Hannant job-shared with a fellow civil servant, Polly Payne, in a number of senior roles, including:

- Director for Strategy and Growth at the Department for Business, Innovation and Skills;
- Director of Higher Education and Higher Education Reform at the Department for Education;
- Director General for Rail Group at the Department for Transport; and
- Director General at the Department for Culture, Media and Sport .

In 2023 Hannant and Payne also served for several months as joint Interim Permanent Secretary of the Department for Culture, Media and Sport. In that capacity they were responsible for the Government’s involvement in delivering the Coronation of Charles III and Camilla.

Hannant and Payne have been described as “job-share pioneers” and were the first civil servants in the UK to be appointed jointly to a Director-General role on that basis.

== Office for Students ==
In 2026 the Secretary of State for Education, Bridget Phillipson, appointed Hannant jointly with Payne as chief executive officers of the Office for Students with effect from 15 June 2026.

== Awards and honours ==
Hannant was appointed as a Companion of the Order of the Bath in the 2024 New Year Honours list, for public service.
