= Edward Peck =

Edward Peck may refer to:

- Edward Armour Peck (1858–1947), member of the Canadian House of Commons
- Sir Edward Peck (British diplomat) (1915–2009), British ambassador to various countries, climber and author
- Edward Peck (American diplomat) (born 1929), retired career United States diplomat
- Edward Peck (academic administrator), vice-chancellor of Nottingham Trent University
