= Polly Payne =

British public servant

Polly Theresa Payne C.B. is a British public servant, who previously held senior roles in the UK Civil Service and is now (with Ruth Hannant) the joint chief executive officer of the Office for Students, the independent regulator of higher education in England.

== Education ==
Payne studied economics as an undergraduate at the University of Bristol, and then obtained a Master’s degree in Development Economics from the University of Sussex.

== Career as economist and civil servant ==
Before joining HM Treasury in 1995 as an economist, Payne carried out fieldwork for the Asian Development Bank on the Policy Alternatives for Livestock Development Project in Mongolia and was subsequently employed as an environmental economist in the Commission for Lands and Environment, Zanzibar, as part of the Overseas Development Institute fellowship programme.

From 2010 Payne job-shared with a fellow civil servant, Ruth Hannant, in a number of senior roles, including:

- Director for Strategy and Growth at the Department for Business, Innovation and Skills;
- Director of Higher Education and Higher Education Reform at the Department for Education;
- Director General for Rail Group at the Department for Transport; and
- Director General at the Department for Culture, Media and Sport.

In 2023 Payne and Hannant also served for several months as joint Interim Permanent Secretary of the Department for Culture, Media and Sport. In that capacity they were responsible for the Government's involvement in delivering the Coronation of Charles III and Camilla.

Payne and Hannant have been described as "job-share pioneers" and were the first civil servants in the UK to be appointed jointly to a Director-General role on that basis.

== Office for Students ==
In 2026 the Secretary of State for Education, Bridget Phillipson, appointed Payne jointly with Hannant as chief executive officers of the Office for Students with effect from 15 June 2026.

== Awards and honours ==
Payne was appointed as a Companion of the Order of the Bath in the 2024 New Year Honours list, for public service.
