= Higher Education Act =

Higher Education Act may refer to:

- Higher Education Act of 1965, in the United States
- Higher Education Act 2004, in the United Kingdom
