= Office for Fair Access =

OFFA's logo

The Office for Fair Access (OFFA) was an independent public body in England that supported the Director of Fair Access to Higher Education in his or her work that was intended to safeguard and promote fair access to higher education. It approved and monitored higher education institutions in England through 'access agreements'.

All English universities and colleges that wanted to charge higher fees must have had 'access agreements' approved by the Director of Fair Access to Higher Education.

The first Director, appointed in 2004, was Sir Martin Harris. He was followed by Les Ebdon, whose appointment was confirmed in February 2012.

As a consequence of the Higher Education and Research Act 2017, OFFA and the Higher Education Funding Council for England were replaced by the new Office for Students. OFFA's responsibilities officially ceased on the 31 March 2018.

== Background ==
The Higher Education Act 2004 introduced the concept of variable tuition fees for the first time. Whilst some parts of the United Kingdom, most notably Scotland, did not implement top-up fees, most universities and higher education institutions (HEIs) in the United Kingdom in England and sought to implement the new funding regime.

That regime allowed HEIs to charge tuition fees of any amount from £0 to £3,000. (These caps were raised in 2010.) At the time this policy was being debated there was considerable concern that the amount of debt new graduates would be faced with could dissuade some potential students from entering higher education altogether. Thus, as part of the debate, the government decided to institute a regulator to ensure that HEIs took steps to ensure that such dissuasion did not occur. The Act established the post of Director of Fair Access to Higher Education and the supporting body OFFA, and gave the Director the power to prevent a HEI charging fees above £1,200 if it could not satisfy the regulator that it would make adequate provision for widening access and encouraging participation.

For the academic year starting September 2012, the amount that institutions could charge increased to £9,000, subject to approval by the Director of Fair Access to Higher Education.

== Structure ==
It was headquartered in Stoke Gifford in South Gloucestershire in the offices of the Higher Education Funding Council for England (HEFCE).

== Aims ==
OFFA stated that it had two core aims:

1. To increase the proportion of learners from under-represented and disadvantaged groups who enter, succeed in and are well prepared to progress from higher education to employment or postgraduate study.
2. To make faster progress in improving access to the most selective higher education institutions by students from under-represented and disadvantaged groups.

These aims were primarily delivered through implementation of approved access agreements, and OFFA's work in monitoring access agreements and disseminating their view of good practice.

== Access agreements ==
An access agreement was a document setting out how a university or college charging higher fees intends to safeguard and promote fair access to higher education through its outreach work, financial support etc. It also includes targets and milestones, set by the university/college itself. Many access agreements remained in force following OFFA's closure and continued to be regulated by the Office for Students.

== Bursaries ==
OFFA defined a bursary as a cash award where the student's eligibility is either wholly or partially dependent on their assessed household income. This is separate from a scholarship which it defined as an award where eligibility is not dependent on the recipient's assessed household income. For example, some universities and colleges offer scholarships based on academic criteria or whether the student lives in the local area.

== Criticism ==
Charges often made against OFFA were that it levelled down standards rather than raising them and that it replaced one form of unfairness with another as reforms were being achieved by "disadvantaging" the brightest children. At the time of its foundation, one member of the then shadow cabinet called OFFA “an interfering, manipulative, corrosive emblem of political correctness. At the time of its closure, the outgoing director rebuked this criticism and noted that for the period of OFFA's existence, there had been an 82% increase in the higher education participation of disadvantaged areas.

== See also ==
- Variable tuition fees (also known, inaccurately, as 'top-up fees')
- Higher Education Funding Council for Wales
- British universities
- Higher Education Act 2004
- Tuition fees (UK)
