= Diego Garcia Rodriguez =

Spanish sociologist and scholar of LGBTIQ+ asylum and religion

Diego García Rodríguez
- Awards: Leverhulme Trust Early Career Fellowship; UK Research and Innovation Future Leaders Fellowship

Academic background
- Education: University College London (PhD)

Academic work
- Discipline: Sociology
- Sub-discipline: Migration studies; asylum studies; gender and sexuality studies; sociology of religion
- Institutions: University of Nottingham
- Notable works: Gender, Sexuality and Islam in Contemporary Indonesia: Queer Muslims and Their Allies (2023)

Diego García Rodríguez is a Spanish sociologist based in the United Kingdom whose research focuses on the intersections of religion, gender and sexuality, and forced migration, with particular attention to LGBTIQ+ asylum and the politics of “homosecular” assumptions in asylum processes. He has held a Leverhulme Early Career Fellowship at the University of Nottingham and was named a UKRI Future Leaders Fellowship award-holder at the University of Leicester.

== Education ==
García Rodríguez completed a PhD in Gender and Sexuality Studies at University College London, and has also studied at Lund University (Asian Studies) and the Complutense University of Madrid (Journalism).

== Career ==
García Rodríguez was based at the University of Nottingham between 2023 and 2026 as a Leverhulme Research Fellow (Early Career Fellow), leading the project Too Religious To Be Queer, which examined how faith and spirituality shape the experiences of LGBTIQ+ people seeking asylum in the UK. In 2025, the University of Leicester announced him as a recipient of a UK Research and Innovation (UKRI) Future Leaders Fellowship for a comparative, multi-country research programme on LGBTIQ+ asylum and policy reform. In February 2026, he started his global LGBTIQ+ asylum project, funded by UK Research and Innovation (UKRI) at the School of Criminology, Sociology and Social Policy at the University of Leicester, and his profile was then highlighted by the FLF Development Network.

== Research ==
García Rodríguez’s doctoral research at University College London focused on gender, sexuality and religion in Indonesia, especially the everyday lives of queer Muslims and their allies. Based on ethnographic fieldwork, this research examined faith and spirituality as sources of agency and explored how queer Muslims negotiated religious, gendered and sexual subjectivities in contemporary Indonesia. This work later informed his monograph Gender, Sexuality and Islam in Contemporary Indonesia: Queer Muslims and Their Allies.

As a Leverhulme Research Fellow at the University of Nottingham, García Rodríguez’s research turned to the experiences of LGBTIQ+ religious refugees and asylum seekers in the United Kingdom. The project examined how religion and non-normative genders and sexualities are often treated as incompatible within asylum systems, challenging secularist assumptions that frame religious LGBTIQ+ people as inauthentic or contradictory. According to his Nottingham profile, the study explored the role of religion and spirituality in the lives of LGBT refugees and asylum seekers, the emergence of queer religious spaces, the impact of secular liberationist discourses on the negotiation of gender, sexuality and religion, and the influence of these dynamics on asylum decision-making processes. As this research evolved, he also extended his focus to Japan for a comparative strand on LGBTIQ+ asylum, visibility, belonging and discrimination.

His UK Research and Innovation (UKRI) Future Leaders Fellowship at the University of Leicester is titled Transforming LGBTIQ+ asylum policies: A multi-country cross-sectoral approach to research, policy, and advocacy. The project aims to transform understanding of LGBTIQ+ asylum through a decolonial and participatory research approach, combining research, policy engagement and advocacy. It begins with the United Kingdom as a core case study and then expands comparatively across Spain, France, Mexico, Kenya and Lebanon. The fellowship is structured around three “colonial pairings” — Mexico–Spain, UK–Kenya, and France–Lebanon — to examine how colonial and postcolonial histories continue to shape asylum governance, legal infrastructures and migration routes. Across these sites, the project investigates issues including mental health and psychosocial wellbeing, credibility and evidentiary practices, faith and everyday religion, safety and violence, housing and accommodation, detention, healthcare access, family and kinship, digital life, language and translation, and work and economic precarity. The fellowship also includes participatory art-based research and public dissemination through documentaries, exhibitions and theatre, with the aim of informing more inclusive asylum policies and strengthening collaboration between researchers, NGOs and policymakers.

== Public engagement ==
In 2024, García Rodríguez was interviewed by BBC Sport on religion and LGBTIQ+ inclusion in football, including discussion of the Premier League's Rainbow Laces campaign. In 2024, his research on LGBTIQ+ lives, family, and religion in Indonesia was cited by El País in a feature on queer experiences in Indonesia. In 2025, he was quoted by the Washington Blade on Japanese electoral politics and debates over LGBTIQ+ rights. He has also contributed writing to outlets including ABC Religion & Ethics and has had commentary syndicated in news aggregators.

=== Queer(y)ing Asylum Podcast ===
García Rodríguez hosts Queer(y)ing Asylum, a podcast on LGBTIQ+ asylum and forced migration featuring conversations with scholars, practitioners, artists, and people with lived experience.

=== Queer(y)ing Asylum Symposium ===
García Rodríguez founded the Queer(y)ing Asylum Symposium at the University of Nottingham on 8 November 2023, which the university described as a ground-breaking event bringing together national and international participants.<ref">"One-day ICEMiC Symposium "Queer(y)ing Asylum"". University of Nottingham.</ref> The symposium continued as a conference series, with a 2024 edition hosted by the University of East London in London (9 November 2024) and a third edition hosted by Lund University (30–31 October 2025), which Lund University described as a leading global conference on queer asylum.

== Selected works ==
- García Rodríguez, D. (2023). Gender, Sexuality and Islam in Contemporary Indonesia: Queer Muslims and Their Allies. Routledge.
- García Rodríguez, D. (2023). “Critiquing Trends and Identifying Gaps in the Literature on LGBTQ Refugees and Asylum-Seekers”. Refugee Survey Quarterly.
- Garcia Rodriguez, D. (2025). “You are a gay man, and you’re also Christian – how is this possible? Homosecularism, religion and LGBTIQ+ asylum in the UK”. Ethnic and Racial Studies.
