= Les Ebdon =

English chemist and academic (born 1947)

Sir Leslie Colin Ebdon CBE DL (born 26 January 1947 in Edmonton, London) is the former Vice-Chancellor of the University of Bedfordshire and Director of Fair Access to Higher Education (head of the Office for Fair Access).

== Education ==
Ebdon attended Hemel Hempstead Grammar School (became The Hemel Hempstead School in 1970). Ebdon went on to obtain both his BSc in Chemistry in 1968 and PhD in 1971 at Imperial College London.

== Career ==
=== Early appointments ===
After lecturing at Makerere University, Kampala from 1971–3 and Sheffield City Polytechnic from 1973 to 1980, he joined what is now the University of Plymouth in 1981 as a lecturer in Analytical Chemistry. In 1989 he was promoted to Head of Department of Environmental Sciences and eventually rose to Deputy Vice-Chancellor (Academic Development).

Ebdon's research interests are in environmental analytical chemistry and his various contributions to our understanding of the behaviour and importance of trace elements in the environment have led to over 250 publications and to several awards.

=== Vice-Chancellor and Chief executive ===
Ebdon was appointed Vice-Chancellor and Chief executive of the University of Luton in September 2003. With the merger of the University and the Bedford campus of De Montfort University in August 2006 he became the Vice-Chancellor of the new University of Bedfordshire. He was succeeded by Bill Rammell as Vice-Chancellor on 1 September 2012, completing his move to the position of Director of Fair Access to Higher Education.

=== Director of Fair Access to Higher Education ===
On 20 February 2012 Ebdon was appointed as Director of Fair Access to Higher Education, the regulator of fair access to higher education in England, despite media criticism and his selection being rejected by the Commons Select Committee tasked with reviewing the recommendation. The Director of Fair Access was a statutory appointment by the Secretary of State for Business, Innovation and Skills, and was supported by the Office for Fair Access.

=== million+ think tank ===
In August 2009, Ebdon, via the think tank 'million+', made the controversial suggestion that universities broaden the social mix of their students by allowing grade boost to poorer students in a bid to increase social mobility.

=== Other appointments ===
Ebdon is a member of the DTI's Measurement Advisory committee and Chair of a Sub Committee, and he is also a member of the European Union DGXII Certification Working Group, known particularly for his expertise on environmental certified reference materials.

Ebdon is a member of the Advisory Board of the Central Science Laboratory of DEFRA. He is currently Chair of Chemistry World Editorial Board and a Member of the Publications Board of the Royal Society of Chemistry.

Ebdon is a member of the Structure and Bonding College of the EPSRC and has chaired various EPSRC committees and served on many Royal Society of Chemistry, National Environmental Research Committees, Ministry of Agriculture Fisheries and Food and DTI Review Groups.

== Recognition ==
Ebdon was appointed Commander of the Order of the British Empire (CBE) in the 2009 New Year Honours. He was knighted in the 2018 Birthday Honours in recognition of services to higher education and social mobility.

Ebdon was named one of Britain's 500 Most Influential People by Debrett's in 2013.

In 1995, the American Microchemical Society awarded him the Benedetti-Pichler medal for outstanding contributions to microchemistry.

In 1986, Ebdon was the Royal Society of Chemistry, Analytical division, School's Lecturer and later in that same year was awarded the 13th SAC Silver Medal by the Royal Society of Chemistry.

Academic offices
Preceded by Dai John	Vice Chancellor of the University of Luton; 2003–2006	Succeeded by position abolished
Preceded by new position	Vice Chancellor of the University of Bedfordshire; 2006–2012	Succeeded by Bill Rammell
