= Research funding in the United Kingdom =

Research funding in the United Kingdom is divided mainly among Non-Departmental Government Bodies: UK Research and Innovation ('UKRI'), and 'Higher Education Funding Bodies'. The budgets of both the UK Research Councils (which later merged into UKRI) and the Higher Education Funding Bodies budgets were set by the Department for Business, Innovation and Skills prior to 2016, at which point department was succeeded by the Department for Business, Energy and Industrial Strategy. UK research funding follows the government policy, the 'Haldane principle', this means research is evaluated by scientists themselves through peer review, not politicians.

== UK Research Councils ==
There are seven Research Councils in the UK (see table below), all of which are now part of UK Research and Innovation. Each council receives funding from the Government's Science Budget (administered through the Department for Business, Innovation and Skills) to fund research in a different area of research with a view to improving the UK economy, society and creating a sustainable world. Some Research Councils also receive income from other Government Departments, commercialisation of research and other research funders.

Research Council	Website
Arts and Humanities Research Council	AHRC Website
Biotechnology and Biological Sciences Research Council	BBSRC website
Engineering and Physical Sciences Research Council	EPSRC website
Economic and Social Research Council	ESRC website
Medical Research Council	MRC website
Natural Environment Research Council	NERC website
Science and Technology Facilities Council	STFC website

== Higher Education Funding Bodies (UK Funding Councils) ==
The four Higher Education Funding Bodies, also referred to as "Funding Councils" (listed below) provide "block grant funding" to support research infrastructure and enable institutions to undertake ground-breaking research.

Funding body	Website
Higher Education Funding Council for England (HEFCE)	HEFCE Website
Higher Education Funding Council for Wales (HEFCW)	HEFCW website
Scottish Funding Council (SFC)	SFC website
Department for Employment and Learning, Northern Ireland (DELNI)	DELNI website

== Dual Research Funding Support System ==
The Research Councils and the Higher Education Funding Bodies make up a dual support system. Research Councils provide grants for specific projects and programmes, while the Higher Education Funding Bodies provide block grant funding to support the research infrastructure and enable institutions research of their choosing. Such funding also provides the capacity to undertake research commissioned by the private sector, Government Departments, charities, the European Union and other international bodies.

== Government funding ==
The Government's research budget allocations for the financial year 15/16 are outlined below.

Organisation	Resource Allocation (RDEL) in £M	Capital Allocation (CDEL)in £M
Arts and Humanities Research Council	98.3	0
Biotechnology and Biological Sciences Research Council	351.2	71
Engineering and Physical Sciences Research Council	778.5	80
Economic and Social Research Council	153.2	25
Medical Research Council	580.3	36
Natural Environment Research Council	289	35
Science and Technology Facilities Council	400	129.1
Higher Education Funding Council for England	1573.3	N/A
Contribution towards Higher Education Innovation Funding	113	N/A
Research Capital England	N/A	117.3
HEI research capital England	N/A	86.2
HEI Research Capital (Scotland)	N/A	16.1
HEI Research Capital (Wales)	N/A	3.7
HEI Research Capital (NI)	N/A	1.7
RIPF (UK)	N/A	100

== See also ==
- Research Councils UK
- Haldane principle
- Brexit and arrangements for science and technology
