= King's College London Act 1997 =

- Act of Parliament
- Parliament of the United Kingdom
- Long title: An Act to unite the United Medical and Dental Schools of Guy's and St. Thomas's Hospitals and King's College London; to transfer all rights, properties and liabilities from the Schools to the College; and for connected and other purposes.
- Citation: 1997 c. iii

Dates
- Royal assent: 31 July 1997

Text of statute as originally enacted

The King's College London Act 1997 (c. iii) is an act of Parliament of the United Kingdom on the governance structure of King's College, London.

== Contents ==
The act makes various amendments to the structure of the College, and its governance.

== List of sections ==
- 1.Short title
- 2.Interpretation
- 3.Appointed day
- 4.Dissolution of Schools
- 5.Transfer of property, etc
- 6.Constitution of Continuing Trustees of Schools
- 7.Restriction on use of certain property
- 8.Transfer of liabilities, etc
- 9.Savings for agreements, deeds, actions, etc
- 10.Construction of bequests, etc
- 11.Transfer of powers to appoint or nominate
- 12.Name of College school of medicine and dentistry
- 13.Dissolution of Delegacy
- 14.Repeals and amendments
- 15.Amendments to College Statutes
- 16.Transitional amendments to College Statutes

== See also ==
- UK enterprise law
- UK constitutional law
- UK labour law
