= Edward Peck (academic administrator) =

Academic Administrator

Professor Edward Peck CBE

Chair of the Office for Students
- Incumbent
- Assumed office 7 July 2025
- Prime Minister: Keir Starmer
- Preceded by: Sir David Behan CBE

Vice-Chancellor of Nottingham Trent University
- In office 1 August 2014 – 6 July 2025

Personal details
- Education: University of Bristol

Edward William Peck CBE is the chair of the board of the UK's Office for Students, the regulator of higher education in England, taking up office on 7 July 2025. Prior to that he was Vice-Chancellor of Nottingham Trent University.

== Career ==
He started his career in management in the NHS, holding senior posts in mental health units in Nottingham and Newcastle. In 1992, Peck joined King's College London, becoming the director of its Centre for Mental Health Services Development two years later. He became a leading figure in the closure of UK psychiatric asylums and the creation of community mental health services.

Peck gained his PhD from Newcastle University in 1997. From 2002 to 2008, he was director of the Health Services Management Centre at the University of Birmingham and professor of public services development.

In 2006, Peck became head of the School of Public Policy at the University of Birmingham. He was appointed the inaugural pro vice-chancellor of the newly-formed College of Social Sciences at the university in 2008, a role he held until becoming vice-chancellor of Nottingham Trent University (NTU) in 2014. During his tenure at NTU it was awarded The Times Higher Education University of the Year in 2017, The Sunday Times Modern University of the Year in 2018 and 2023, The Guardian University of the Year in 2019 and the What Uni University of the Year in 2023. He left NTU in July 2025.

In 2018 he was invited by Theresa May to join the panel of the Post-18 Education Review of fees and funding of both HE and FE, also known as the Augar Review, after its chair Philip Augar. Peck has been a trustee of both the Universities and Colleges Employers' Association (UCEA) and the Universities and Colleges Admissions Service (UCAS), where he was Chair in 2024/25. He was President of the Newark and Nottinghamshire Agricultural Society between 2019 and 2022. He was an elected member of the Board of Universities UK between 2019 and 2022.

== Honours ==
Peck is a Fellow of the Academy of Social Sciences. In July 2020 Peck was appointed Deputy Lieutenant of Nottinghamshire and stood down in July 2025.

He was appointed Commander of the Order of the British Empire (CBE) in the 2021 New Year Honours for services to higher education.

== Selected works ==
- Peck, E., (1995). "The Performance of an NHS Trust Board: actor's accounts, minutes and observation", British Journal of Management, 6, 2, 135-155.
- Freeman, T. and Peck, E. (2007). "Performing governance: a partnership board dramaturgy", Public Administration, 85, 4, 907-929.
- Peck, E. and 6, Perri (2006). Beyond Delivery: Policy Implementation as Sense-Making and Settlement, Houndsmills, Palgrave Macmillan
- Peck, Edward and Helen Dickinson (2009) Performing Leadership, Palgrave Macmillan, Basingstoke. ISBN 978-0-230-21811-6
- Peck, Goodwin, Perri, and Freeman (2016), Managing Networks of Twenty-First Century Organisations, Palgrave Macmillan, ISBN 978-0-230-28611-5
