= Research England =

UK government agency

Council overview
- Status: Council within UK Research and Innovation
- Headquarters: Swindon, Wiltshire, England
- Annual budget: £2,006 million (FY2024/25)
- Ministers responsible: Liz Kendall MP, Secretary of State for Science, Innovation and Technology; Patrick Vallance, Minister of State for Science, Research and Innovation
- Parent department: Department for Science, Innovation and Technology
- Parent body: UK Research and Innovation
- Website: re.ukri.org

The Research England is a council of UK Research and Innovation (UKRI), a non-departmental public body sponsored by the Department for Science, Innovation and Technology, responsible for overseeing the functions of UKRI in relation to university research and knowledge transfer in England. This includes:

- providing funding to English universities for research and knowledge exchange activities
- developing and implementing the Research Excellence Framework (REF) in partnership with the UK Higher Education funding bodies
- developing the Knowledge Exchange Framework (KEF)
- overseeing the sustainability the Higher Education research base in England
- managing the £900 million UK Research Partnership Investment Fund
- administering the Higher Education Innovation Fund (HEIF)

== See also ==
- Higher Education Funding Council for England
- Research funding in the United Kingdom
