= Higher Education Act 2004 =

Act of the Parliament of the United Kingdom

Higher Education Act 2004 (Note: Section 54(1).)
- Act of Parliament
- Parliament of the United Kingdom
- Long title: An Act to make provision about research in the arts and humanities and about complaints by students against institutions providing higher education; to make provision about fees payable by students in higher education; to provide for the appointment of a Director of Fair Access to Higher Education; to make provision about grants and loans to students in higher or further education; to limit the jurisdiction of visitors of institutions providing higher education; and for connected purposes.
- Citation: 2004 c. 8
- Territorial extent: England and Wales, except that sections 42(1) and (2) and (5) also extend to Northern Ireland, that Part 1 and sections 45 and 47 and 48 and 51 to 54 also extend to that country and to Scotland, and that any amendment or repeal made by this Act has the same extent within the United Kingdom as the enactment to which it relates. (Note: Section 53.)

Dates
- Royal assent: 1 July 2004
- Commencement: Various (Note: Section 52.)
Other legislation
Amends	Education Act 1996
Amended by	Charities Act 2011; Higher Education (Freedom of Speech) Act 2023

Status: Amended

Text of statute as originally enacted

Revised text of statute as amended

The Higher Education Act 2004 (c. 8) is an act of the Parliament of the United Kingdom that introduced several changes to the higher education system in the United Kingdom, the most important and controversial being a major change to the funding of universities, and the operation of tuition fees, which affects England and Wales. University funding is a devolved matter for Northern Ireland and Scotland. After complex and controversial debates, the Higher Education Bill received royal assent on 1 July 2004.

== Background and political importance ==
Until 1998, all education in the United Kingdom was free up to and including university courses. However, shortly after coming to power, the Labour Party under Prime Minister Tony Blair abolished the student maintenance grant system and introduced an up-front fee fixed at just over £1,000 per year for all university students. Up to a quarter of this fee was waived for the poorest students, but some maintained that education should remain a free public service, and that the system would place students in unnecessary levels of debt. The government, however, insisted that fees were the best means of providing university funding. At the same time, they stated that their aim was to increase the proportion of students going on to Higher Education to 50% by 2010.

In the years that followed, it became clear that the original fixed fees of around £1,000 per year were still not providing enough funding, leading to proposals of what are often referred to as top-up fees. The idea was that universities would be able to "top up" the fees to a level that more accurately reflected the funding they needed. However, widespread protests led the Labour Party to make a manifesto pledge at the 2001 general election not to introduce such a system.

In 2003, a new set of proposals was drafted, which were denounced by some as breaking that promise. Although the government tried to create a compromise that would raise the necessary funds in a fair way, the issue remained highly contentious. Despite vocal opposition within his own party, Tony Blair claimed that this proposal was the only way to secure the necessary funds, and the issue was seen as a key test of his leadership. The initial vote in the House of Commons, on 27 January 2004, came a day before the result of the Hutton Inquiry, and it was predicted that a bad result from one or both would lead to Blair's resignation as Prime Minister. The Bill was passed at the first vote, known as second reading, by 316 votes to 311, with 71 Labour MPs voting against.

The Bill faced further opposition as it progressed through Parliament. There was some controversy regarding the appointment of mainly loyalist MPs to the Standing Committee assigned to review the Bill. Of the 16 Labour MPs on the committee, only one voted against the government at second reading, and one abstained, suggesting that little criticism was likely during this stage. It then returned to the floor of the Commons for the Report stage. The main opposition to the bill from Labour backbenchers concerned the "variable" or "top-up" fees, therefore an amendment tabled at Report stage to remove references to these variable fees appeared to have some chance of succeeding. In addition, some backbenchers were promised further concessions and changes to the Bill, and therefore voted in favour at the second reading. If these promises had been felt to have been broken, these members might well have vote against the Bill at third reading.

Additionally, if the Bill had been successfully passed at third reading, it would have moved to the House of Lords, where the Government did not have a majority, and where for this particular Bill, the Salisbury Convention – according to which legislation included in the manifesto of the ruling party should not be opposed – would not have applied. This is because the policy was not included in the Labour party manifesto in 2001 – and some would argue it went against the line reading "We will not introduce top-up fees and have legislated to prevent them". Therefore, it is quite possible that the Lords would have rejected the bill outright, which would have meant that the government would have had to table the Bill again in the next session of Parliament, and would possibly have had to use the Parliament Acts 1911 and 1949 in order to force it through Parliament and gain royal assent. Alternatively, the Lords could have passed a "wrecking amendment" which would have needed to be reversed by the House of Commons.

== Provisions ==
The Higher Education Bill also includes several less well-known provisions:

- Creation of an Office for Fair Access (OFFA) to oversee the approval and review of universities' plans with regarding fees to ensure that they were encouraging applications from non-traditional students.
- Transfer of additional powers to the National Assembly for Wales, including a separate equivalent to OFFA and the right to organise both student support and tuition fees independently.
- An independent adjudicator for dealing with student complaints which universities will be legally bound to deal with.
- An Arts and Humanities Research Council equivalent to existing Science and Technology Councils, as a replacement for the current Arts and Humanities Research Board. This is the only aspect of the Act to directly affect Scotland and Northern Ireland

=== Details of the proposed changes to funding ===
The Act incorporates several key changes to the financial arrangements of higher education students, including multiple additional terms that were added to convince those who opposed earlier drafts. The changes took effect in 2006, and apply to England and Wales.

- Up-front fees to be replaced by an income-linked deferred payment. Instead of having to pay each year while studying, students are to be loaned the funds by the government and repayments will be made out of income once the graduate is earning more than £15000 per year. The loan is charged at the Retail Prices Index (United Kingdom) rate.
  - The payment rates will be entirely earnings based, so that as a graduate's salary fluctuates, so will their fee payments. If their salary falls below £15000, no payments will be taken.
  - Additionally, any amount of a student's fees still outstanding after 25 years will be cancelled.
- Fixed rate of £1125 to be replaced by variable fees between 0 and £3000. Since different courses cost different amounts of money to run, it is argued that students should pay different levels of fees. Under the new system, universities will be able to set the level of the fees for each course, within a given range.
  - Although the change does represent a significant increase in the level of fees, some universities had called for much higher rates – in some cases up to £12000 a year. Furthermore, the top rate cannot be increased without a motion being passed in both Houses of Parliament, and the government has promised not to propose such a motion before 2009, assuaging fears that it would rise dramatically soon after the legislation was passed.
  - In order to charge more than the basic amount (equivalent to the current fixed rate), a university will have to produce an appropriate "plan", which may have to include details of how students from poorer backgrounds will be encouraged to participate. These plans will be subject to approval and review by the Office for Fair Access.
- Increased levels of financial aid. As part of the "package" of this reform, increased government grants, and bursaries set up by the universities themselves, will be put in place in such a way that the maximum allowance will equal the maximum fee – i.e. £3000 – for the poorest students. Presently, this will come from several sources, making it hard to understand, but plans to combine the various elements may still be introduced during the committee stage.

== Arguments in favour of the proposals ==
The principal argument in favour of a new funding system is that British universities are currently critically underfunded, and an increased level of fees will result in a cash injection and prevent them collapsing. Additionally, much is made of the need for British institutions to be internationally "competitive" in terms of quality and resources, and that this is impossible to achieve without a reform of their funding.

A key player on this side of the argument is the Russell Group of Universities, who have argued that they should be able to charge much increased fees in order to differentiate themselves from smaller universities. This attitude has proved unpopular, as a two-tier system of this kind is widely viewed as unnecessary and damaging. The levels called for by this group far exceed the maximum rate currently proposed.

Further to this argument, it is argued that since studies show that most graduates earn more during their career than non-graduates, it is logical that they should be the ones to pay for this opportunity, not the public at large. Critics, however, have suggested that if this is the case, they will pay more income tax anyway, and that this would be a fairer source of the money. Some have also pointed out that the country as a whole benefits from an increased level of expertise, and therefore it is in everyone's interests to pay for higher education.

== Arguments against the proposals ==
The most common criticism of the proposals is that increasing tuition fees will increase the level of debt graduates will have when they leave. Organisations such as the National Union of Students have argued that students are already under too much financial pressure, and that this will make things worse, not better. A number of students have had to take up part-time work in order to pay living costs while studying, and this has been shown to have an adverse effect on their results.

Although the Bill removes the need to pay fees up front – meaning that students may have more spending money while studying – it will still leave them with a greater debt at the start of their careers. While it was predicted that people from poorer backgrounds may be put off from enrolling for a degree because of the measure, the number of young people engaged in higher education has actually risen, most markedly in those coming from poorer backgrounds.

A second line of criticism is that the introduction of variable fees represents a step towards the privatisation of education, and makes degrees into products quite unnecessarily. Although not the intention of the legislation, there is likely to be a perceived trade-off between price and quality when choosing a degree. The strict limits imposed on fee levels limit this in practice, but the concept of competition remains. This is not, however, so relevant today as the vast majority of universities opt to charge the maximum £3,290 (2010 Entry).

== Section 52 – Commencement ==
The following orders have been made under this section:

- The Higher Education Act 2004 (Commencement No. 1 and Transitional Provisions) Order 2004 (S.I. 2004/2781 (C. 116))
- The Higher Education Act 2004 (Commencement No. 2) Order 2004 (S.I. 2004/3255 (C. 145))
- The Higher Education Act 2004 (Commencement No. 3) Order 2005 (S.I. 2005/767 (C. 32))
- The Higher Education Act 2004 (Commencement No. 4) Order 2006 (S.I. 2006/51 (C. 1))
- The Higher Education Act 2004 (Commencement No. 1 and Transitional Provision) (Wales) Order 2004 (S.I. 2004/3144 (W. 272) (C. 136))
- The Higher Education Act 2004 (Commencement No. 2 and Transitional Provision) (Wales) Order 2005 (S.I. 2005/1833 (W. 149) (C. 79))
- The Higher Education Act 2004 (Commencement No. 2 and Transitional Provision) (Wales) (Amendment) Order 2006 (S.I. 2006/1660 (W. 159) (C. 56))
- The Higher Education Act 2004 (Commencement No. 3) (Wales) Order 2011 (S.I. 2011/297 (W. 50) (C. 13))
- The Higher Education Act 2004 (Commencement No. 1) (Scotland) Order 2005 (S.S.I. 2005/33 (C. 3)

== See also ==
- Education Act
