= UK Research and Innovation =

Research funding body for the United Kingdom

Non-departmental public body overview
- Formed: 1 April 2018; 8 years ago
- Headquarters: Swindon, Wiltshire, England
- Employees: 9001 (FY2024/25)
- Annual budget: £9,966 million (FY2024/25)
- Ministers responsible: Jonathan Reynolds MP, Secretary of State for Business, Innovation, Science and Trade; Chris McDonald MP, Minister of State for Science, Innovation and Investment
- Non-departmental public body executives: Sir Andrew Mackenzie, Chair; Professor Sir Ian Chapman, Chief Executive
- Parent department: Department for Business, Innovation, Science and Trade
- Child agencies: Arts and Humanities Research Council; Biotechnology and Biological Sciences Research Council; Economic and Social Research Council; Innovate UK; Engineering and Physical Sciences Research Council; Medical Research Council; Natural Environment Research Council; Research England; Science and Technology Facilities Council
- Website: www.ukri.org

UK Research and Innovation (UKRI) is a non-departmental public body of the Government of the United Kingdom that directs research and innovation funding, funded through the science budget of the Department for Business, Innovation, Science and Trade.

== History and role ==
UKRI was created following a report by Sir Paul Nurse, the president of the Royal Society, who recommended the merger in order to increase integrative cross-disciplinary research.

UKRI was established on 1 April 2018 by the Higher Education and Research Act 2017. It brought together the seven research councils and two additional bodies, Innovate UK and Research England. Innovate UK (formerly the Technology Strategy Board) was an arm's length body of the Department of Trade and Industry, while Research England succeeded the former Higher Education Funding Council for England. Research England is responsible for the Research Excellence Framework, or REF, and is developing a new knowledge exchange framework, KEF.

Working in partnership with universities, research organisations, businesses, charities, and government, its mission is to foster research and development within the United Kingdom and create a positive "impact"—"push the frontiers of human knowledge and understanding", "deliver economic impact", and "create social and cultural impact". The first Chief Executive Officer of UKRI was the immunologist Professor Sir Mark Walport. He was succeeded in June 2020 by plant biologist Professor Dame Ottoline Leyser.

== Councils ==
Council	Formation	Website	Budget (FY2024/25)
Arts and Humanities Research Council	2005	AHRC website	£77 million
Biotechnology and Biological Sciences Research Council	1994	BBSRC website	£322 million
Engineering and Physical Sciences Research Council	1994	EPSRC website	£641 million
Economic and Social Research Council	1965	ESRC website	£134 million
Medical Research Council	1913	MRC website	£604 million
Natural Environment Research Council	1965	NERC website	£320 million
Science and Technology Facilities Council	2007	STFC website	£608 million
Innovate UK	2007	Innovate UK	£919 million
Research England	2018	Research England	£2006 million

== See also ==
- Advanced Research and Invention Agency
- National Institute for Health and Care Research, another major UK research funding source.

== Sources ==
- "UKRI's rebrand promotes "knowledge with impact"". designweek.co.uk. 22 October 2019.
