= Senator Motlow =

Senator Motlow may refer to:

- J. Reagor Motlow (1898–1978), Tennessee State Senate
- Lem Motlow (1869–1947), Tennessee State Senate
