= Moore County High School =

Location
- 1502 Lynchburg Highway; Lynchburg, TN 37352
- 35.30219°N 86.36073°W

Information
- Type: Public high school
- School district: Moore County School District
- Staff: 32.00 (on FTE basis)
- Grades: 7–12
- Enrollment: 423 (2022–2023)
- Student to teacher ratio: 13.22
- Color
- Mascot: Raider
- Information: 931-759-4231
- Website: https://sites.google.com/moorecountyschools.net/mchs/home

Moore County High School is a six-year public high school in Lynchburg, Tennessee, serving students in grades 7–12 from Moore County, Tennessee, as part of the Moore County School District.

As of the 2005–06 school year, the school had an enrollment of 449 students and 29.8 classroom teachers (on a FTE basis, for a student-teacher ratio of 15.1.

== Notable alumni ==
- Jimmy Bedford (1940–2009), sixth master distiller at Jack Daniel's.
