= J. Reagor Motlow =

American politician

- Born: February 15, 1898; Moore County, Tennessee, U.S.
- Died: March 12, 1978 (aged 80); Tullahoma, Tennessee, U.S.
- Education: Vanderbilt University
- Occupations: Businessman, politician
- Spouse: Jeanie Garth
- Parent: Lem Motlow
- Relatives: Jack Daniel (great-uncle)

J. Reagor Motlow (February 15, 1898 – March 12, 1978) was an American businessman, politician, landowner, and philanthropist. He was the owner of the Jack Daniel's distillery. He served as a member of the Tennessee House of Representatives and the Tennessee Senate. He donated the land upon which the campus of Motlow State Community College and the public library in Lynchburg were built.

== Early life ==
Motlow was born in 1898 in Moore County, Tennessee. His father, Lem Motlow, was the owner of Jack Daniel's, the whiskey distillery. His great-uncle was Jack Daniel. He graduated from Vanderbilt University, where he earned a bachelor's degree in 1919.

== Career ==
Motlow began his career working for a mill in Union City, Tennessee, in the 1920s. He joined his family business, Jack Daniel's, as executive vice president from 1938 to 1947, and he served as its president from 1939 to 1963. When it was acquired by Brown–Forman in 1956, Motlow served on the company's board of directors.

Motlow served as a member of the Tennessee House of Representatives and the Tennessee Senate, retiring in 1976. During his tenure, he approved the construction of many public buildings in Downtown Nashville, including the James K. Polk State Office Building, and he supported funding for education and libraries.

Motlow was a landowner in Moore County. He donated the land on which the public library in Lynchburg and the campus of Motlow State Community College were built. He also served on the Board of Trust of his alma mater, Vanderbilt University.

== Personal life and death ==
Motlow married Jeanie Garth in 1928.

Motlow died on March 12, 1978, in Tullahoma, Tennessee.
