= Lynchburg Historic District =

Historic district in Tennessee, United States

- U.S. National Register of Historic Places
- U.S. Historic district
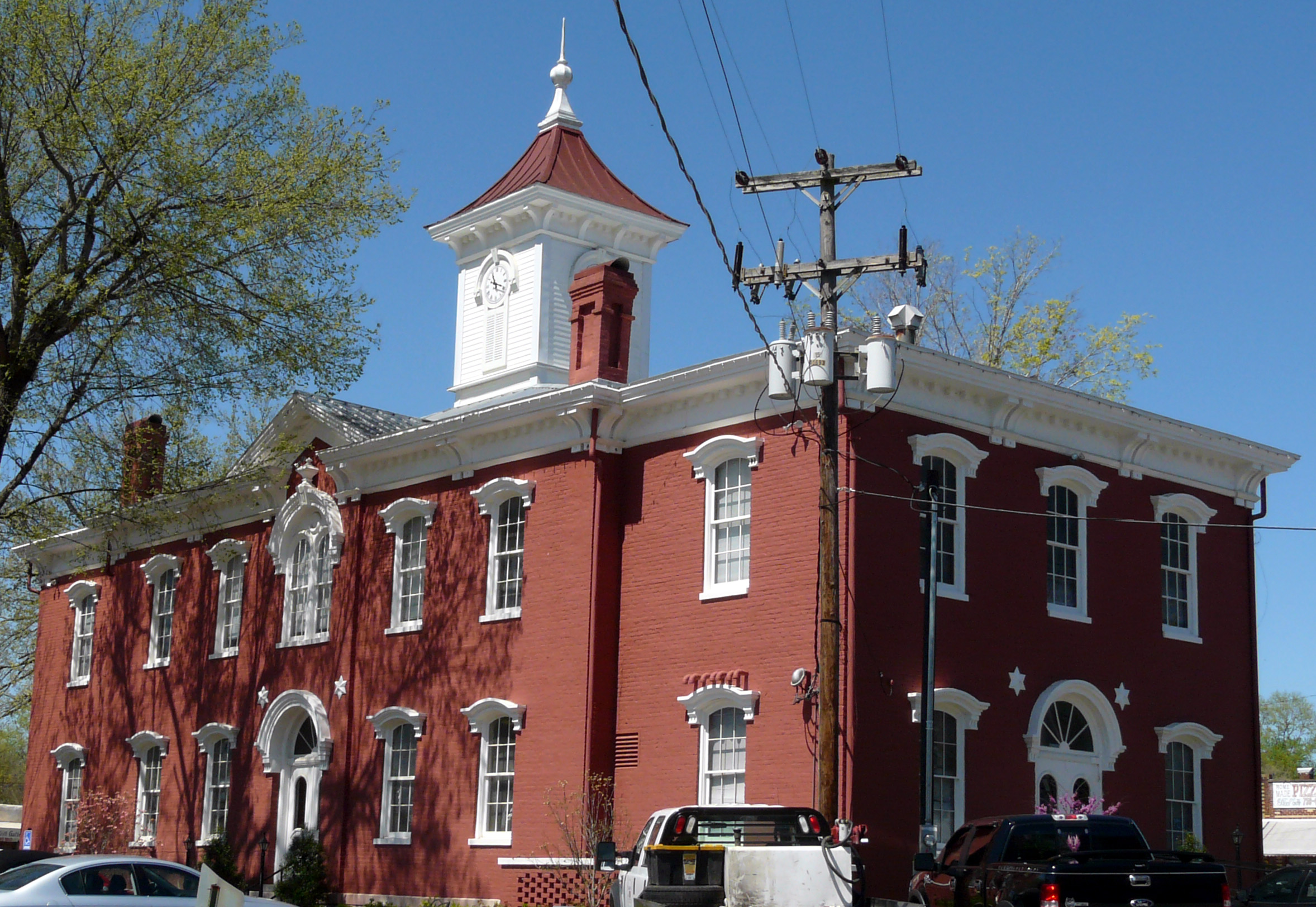
- Moore County Courthouse

- Location within Tennessee Location within the United States
- Location: Roughly bounded by Majors, Main, Elm, and Wall Sts., Lynchburg, Tennessee
- Coordinates: 35°16′56″N 86°22′28″W
- Area: 32 acres (13 ha)
- Architectural style: Greek Revival, Italianate, Bungalow/craftsman
- NRHP reference No.: 96000771
- Added to NRHP: July 19, 1996

The Lynchburg Historic District encompasses the historic civic and commercial center of Lynchburg, Tennessee. It extends along Main Street and Majors Boulevard from their eastern junction to Elm Street, and includes the main courthouse square. The area developed as the economic and civic heart of Moore County after Lynchburg was designated the county seat in 1871, and much of its architecture dates to the period after 1883, when a fire destroyed many buildings. The district was listed on the National Register of Historic Places in 1996.

== See also ==
- National Register of Historic Places listings in Moore County, Tennessee
