= Lem Motlow =

American businessman (1869–1947)

- Born: Lemuel Motlow; November 28, 1869; Moore County, Tennessee, U.S.
- Died: September 1, 1947 (aged 77); Lynchburg, Tennessee, U.S.
- Occupations: Businessman; politician
- Spouses: Clara Reagor; Ophelia Evans
- Children: 4 sons, including J. Reagor Motlow, and 1 daughter
- Relatives: Jack Daniel (uncle)

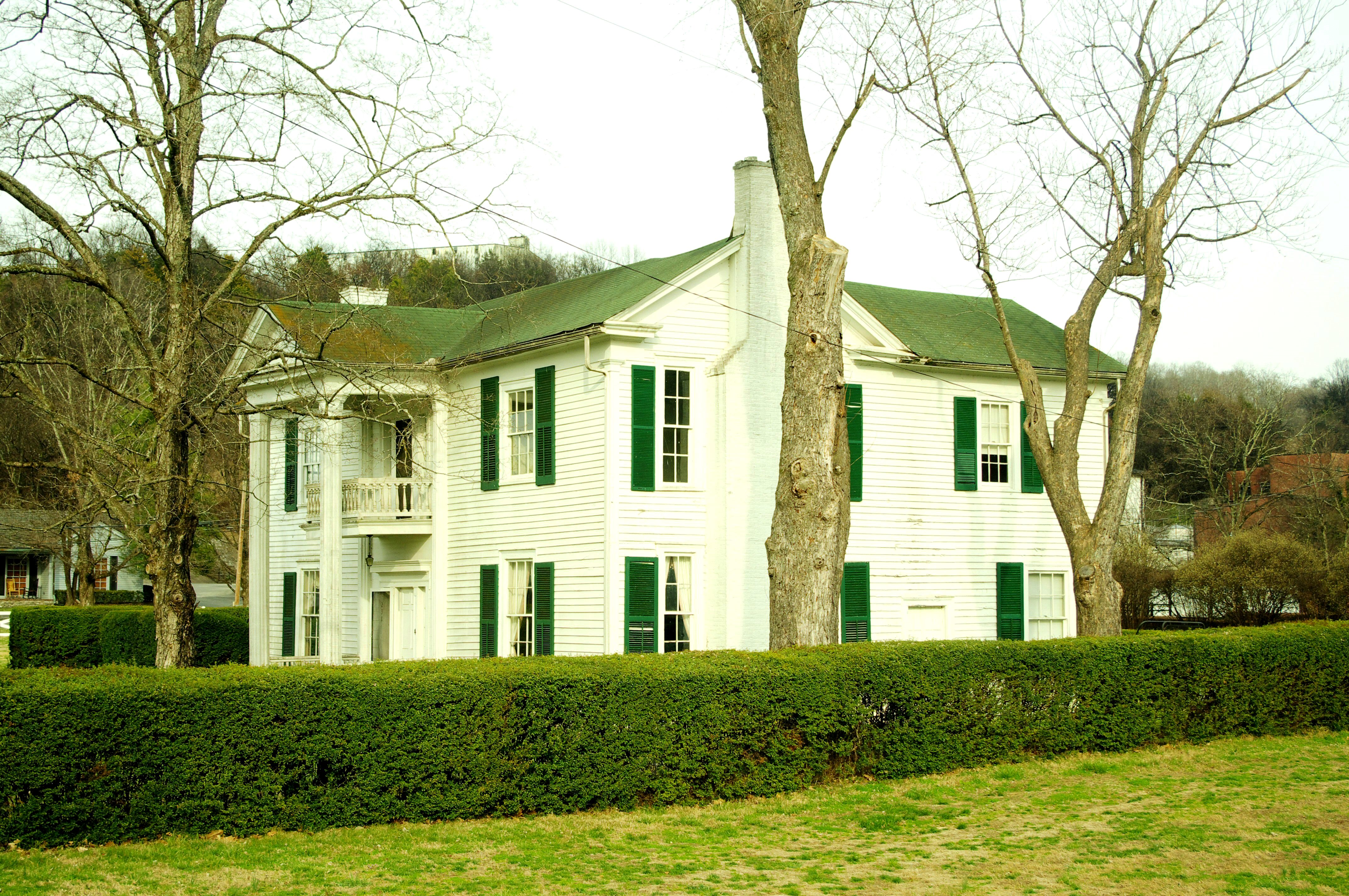
The home of Lem Motlow (1869–1947) at the Jack Daniel's Distillery in Lynchburg, Tennessee, United States. Motlow, a nephew of Daniel, ran the distillery from 1911 until his death. The house was built circa 1870, and is now used by the distillery for office space.

Lemuel Motlow (November 28, 1869 – September 1, 1947) was an American businessman, politician, landowner and Tennessee Walking Horse breeder. He was the owner of Jack Daniel's, and he served in the Tennessee House of Representatives and the Tennessee Senate.

== Early life ==
Motlow was born on November 28, 1869, in Moore County, Tennessee, near Lynchburg. His father was Felix Motlow and his mother, Nettie Josephine Daniel. He had four brothers. His maternal uncle, Jack Daniel, was the eponymous founder of the whiskey manufacturer.

== Career ==
Motlow began his career by working for his uncle. He inherited Jack Daniel's in 1907. Due to Prohibition, he was unable to sell whiskey from 1920 onward. As Lynchburg was a market town for mules at the time, Motlow sold harnesses instead.

Motlow sued the Moore County court to be able to reopen his distillery after the end of Prohibition in 1933, but he was only able to do so in 1938. To reduce the powers of the county court, Motlow decided to run for office. He was elected as a member of the Tennessee House of Representatives in 1933, and as a member of the Tennessee Senate in 1939. By 1947, Jack Daniel's was the only whiskey distillery in Tennessee, then a dry state.

Motlow owned thousands of acres in Moore County and Coffee County, where he bred Tennessee Walking Horses. His horses competed in the Tennessee Walking Horse National Celebration in Shelbyville.

== Murder trial ==
In 1924, Motlow was charged with murdering Clarence Pullis, a railroad porter. Motlow was a passenger on an L&N train when a confrontation arose between him and a black porter named Ed Wallis who asked Motlow to produce his ticket. Motlow allegedly used a racial epithet triggering a fight. Pullis, who was white, attempted to separate the two men, and was shot and killed by Motlow who discharged a handgun, intending to shoot Wallis. Motlow was tried in St. Louis, represented by a team of defense lawyers who turned the trial into a racially charged affair, blaming Wallis as the instigator. The all-white jury acquitted Motlow.

== Personal life and death ==
Motlow was married twice. He married his first wife, Clara Reagor, in 1895, and they had a son, J. Reagor Motlow. She died in 1901, and he married Ophelia Evans, with whom he had three more sons: Cliff Conner Motlow; Dan Evans Motlow; and Robert Motlow, and a daughter, Mary Avon Boyd.

Lem Motlow suffered a stroke in 1940. He died of cerebral haemorrhage on September 1, 1947, in Lynchburg, at age 77. He was buried in the Lynchburg cemetery.
