= Patrick Wensink =

American author (born 1979)

Patrick Wensink (born 1979) is an American author.

His novel Broken Piano for President received increased publicity when the whiskey company Jack Daniel's Properties (a subsidiary of Brown–Forman) sent a politely worded cease-and-desist letter to the author asking that he change the design of his book cover, which closely resembled the label on Jack Daniel's whiskey. However, the whiskey company said it could be done upon the book's next reprinting and it would compensate the author if he chose to comply during the current run.

The controversy propelled Broken Piano for President to the #6 bestseller position and the #1 positions for satires on Amazon.com. In an article on Huffington Post, Wensink used this experience as a model for how books can gain publicity.

His other books include Sex Dungeon for Sale! and Black Hole Blues.
