= Motlow State Community College =

Multi-campus college in middle Tennessee, US

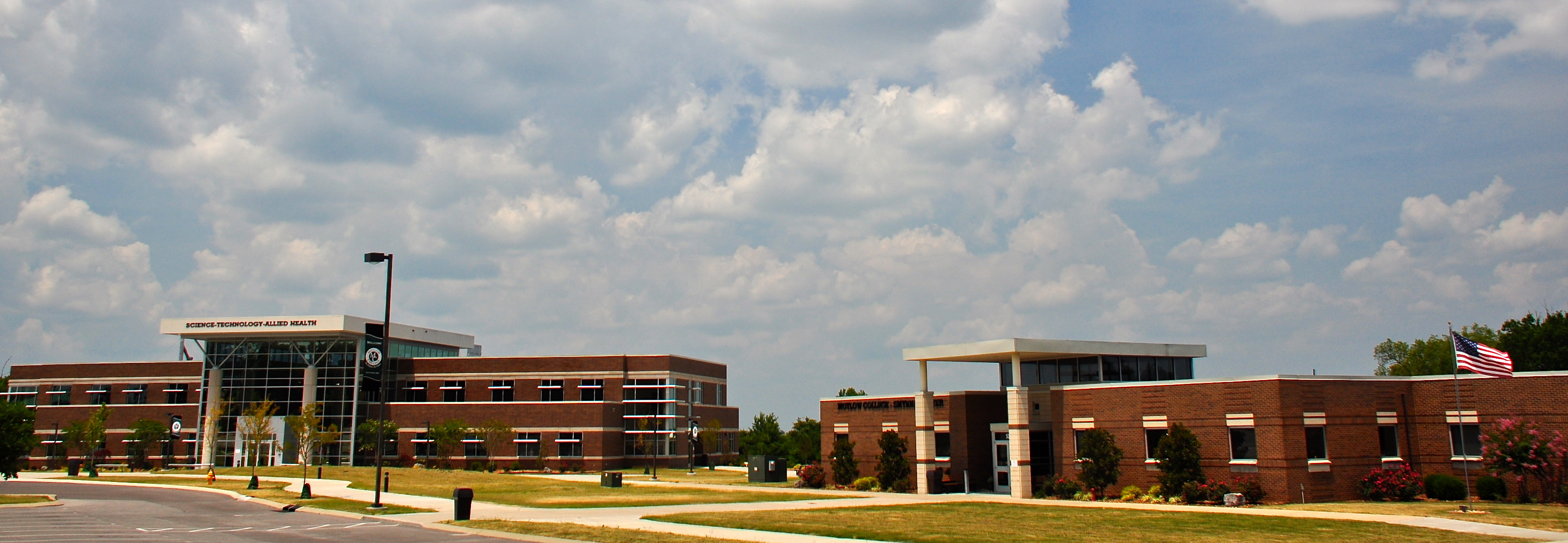
- Motlow State Community College - Smyrna Center
- Type: Public community college
- Established: 1969
- Affiliations: TCCAA / NJCAA
- President: Michael L. Torrence
- Students: 5,000
- Location: Lynchburg, McMinnville, Fayetteville and Smyrna, Tennessee, United States; 35.3658°N 86.2999°W
- Colors: Green & Gold
- Nicknames: Bucks & Lady Bucks
- Mascot: Reagor the buck
- Website: Motlow.edu

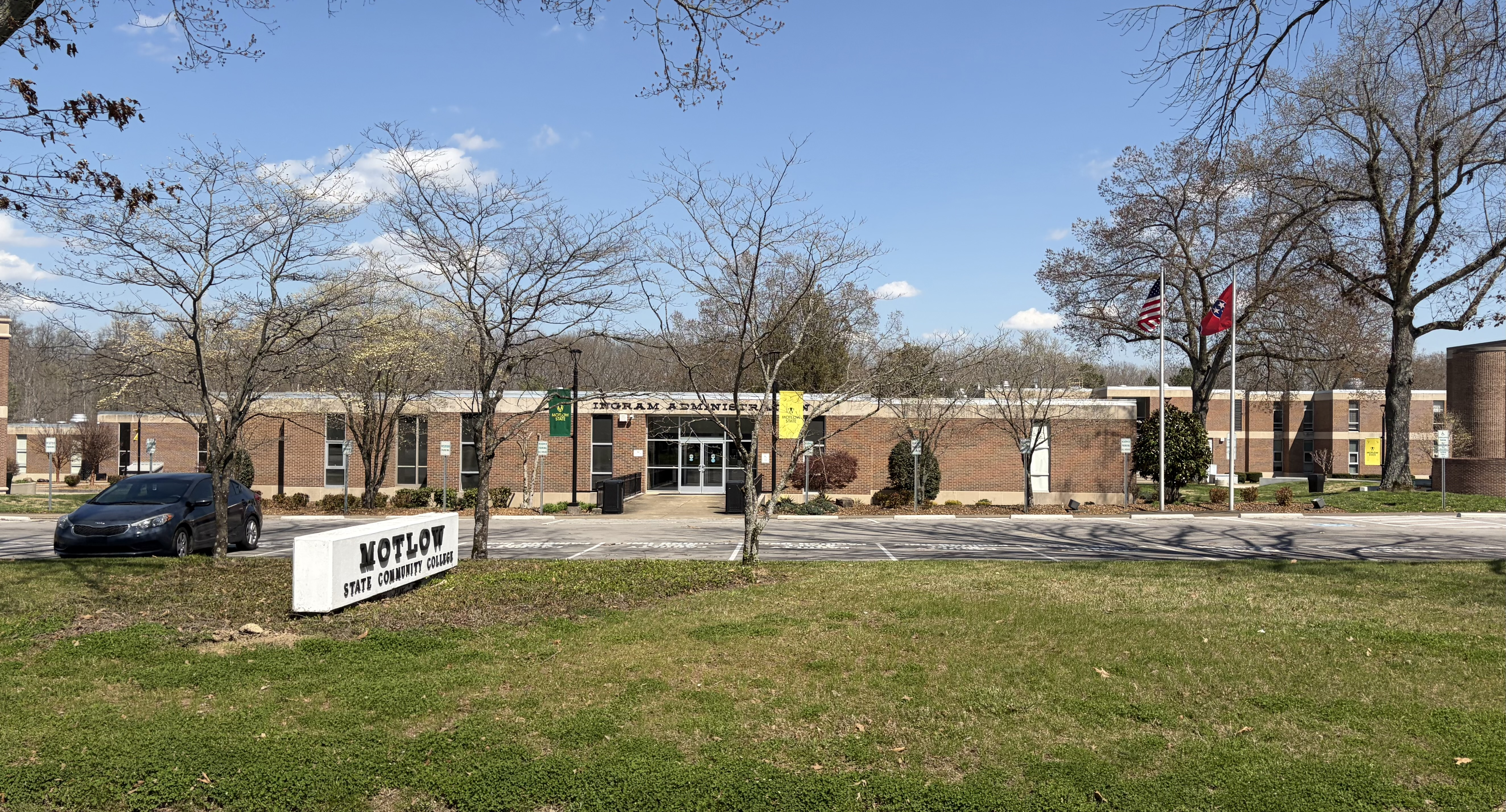
Motlow State Community College’s Moore County campus near Tullahoma, Tennessee

Motlow State Community College is a public community college with multiple locations in southern Middle Tennessee. The main campus opened its facilities in 1969 and is located in Moore County on 187 acres of land donated by the late Senator Reagor Motlow and family. Motlow College also has learning centers in Fayetteville, McMinnville and Smyrna, a teaching site in Sparta and a partnership with the Middle Tennessee Education Center in Shelbyville.

The college residents in an 11-county service area including Bedford, Cannon, Coffee, DeKalb, Franklin, Lincoln, Moore, Rutherford, Van Buren, Warren, and White. The college also allows residents of three border counties in Alabama to pay in-state tuition: Madison, Jackson, and Limestone counties.

Motlow participates in baseball/softball, and men's and women's basketball, and women's soccer as part of the Tennessee Community College Athletic Association and the National Junior College Athletic Association.

== History ==
The Motlow family donated 187 acres (0.76 km^{2}) of land on which the college is built in Moore County, Tennessee; subsequently, the college bears the family name—Motlow College.

=== Presidents ===
- Sam Ingram (president 1968–1975)
- Harry Wagner (president 1975–1986)
- Wade Powers (interim president 1986–1987)
- A. Frank Glass (president 1987–2003)
- Arthur L. Walker, Jr. (president 2003–2006)
- MaryLou Apple (president 2006–2015)
- Anthony Kinkel (president 2015–2017)
- Hilda Tunstill (interim president 2017)
- Michael L. Torrence (president 2018–present)

== Accreditation ==
Motlow is accredited by the Commission on Colleges of the Southern Association of Colleges and Schools to award the Level 1 associate degree.

== Notable alumni ==
- Freddie Goldstein or Freddie Lish, basketball player
- Bryan Morris, professional baseball pitcher for the Miami Marlins of Major League Baseball
- Aleksandar Zečević (born 1996), Serbian basketball player in the Israeli Basketball Premier League
