= Three wise men (cocktail) =

Cocktail blending three types of whiskey together

Three wise men is a drink consisting of three types of whiskey with brand names that are each named after a man (ordinarily Johnnie Walker, Jack Daniel and Jim Beam). The three named men are the "wise men" in the name of the drink, which is an allusion to the Biblical Magi. Several variations exist that include other ingredients or substitute tequila or rum for some of the whiskey.

== Recipe ==
1 part Scotch whisky (e.g., Johnnie Walker Red or Black Label)
1 part Tennessee whiskey (e.g., Jack Daniel's)
1 part Bourbon whiskey (e.g., Jim Beam White or Black Label)
Serve neat, on the rocks, or shaken with ice and strained, according to taste. Or serve the three whiskeys as three separate shots that are lined up and consumed sequentially.

=== Variations ===
By adding an ingredient, a number of variations can be made, such as:

- A three wise men go hunting, or "three wise men on a hunt" consists of the traditional recipe with an additional 1 part Wild Turkey bourbon.
- A three wise men visit Mexico is made with the three aforementioned liquors and 1 part tequila, e.g., Jose Cuervo.

== See also ==
- List of cocktails
