= Jack Daniel =

American distiller (1849–1911)

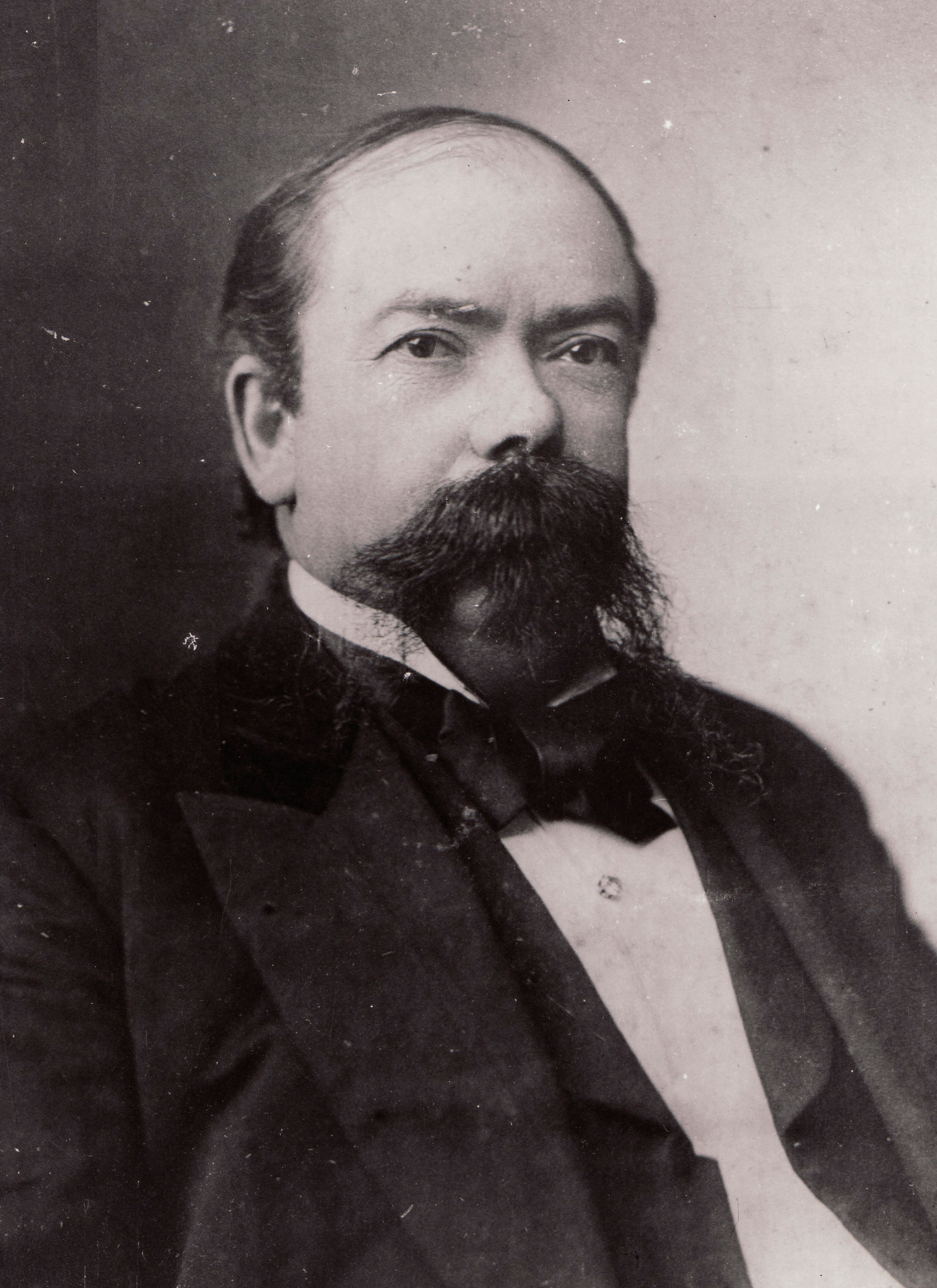
- Born: Jasper Newton Daniel c. 1849; Lynchburg, Tennessee, U.S.
- Died: October 9, 1911 (aged 61–62); Lynchburg, Tennessee, U.S.
- Occupations: Distiller; businessman
- Years active: c. 1865 – 1907
- Known for: Jack Daniel's Tennessee whiskey
- Relatives: Lem Motlow (nephew); J. Reagor Motlow (great-nephew)
- Website: jackdaniels.com

Jasper Newton "Jack" Daniel (c. 1849 – October 9, 1911) was an American distiller and businessman, best known as the founder of the Jack Daniel's Tennessee whiskey distillery.

== Early life ==
Jasper Newton Daniel was the youngest of ten children born to Calaway and Lucinda Matilda (née Cook) Daniel. He was of Scots-Irish, Scottish, and Welsh descent; his grandfather, Joseph "Job" Daniel, was born in Wales, while his grandmother, Elizabeth Calaway, was born in Scotland. His paternal grandparents emigrated to the United States in the late 18th century.

Daniel's date of birth is unknown, with various sources placing it in 1846, 1849 and 1850. According to one source, he was born in January 1849, in or around Lynchburg, Tennessee. An alternative possibility is that Jack was born in late 1846 since his mother died in January 1847. A town fire had destroyed the courthouse records, and, because his mother died shortly after his birth, most likely due to complications from childbirth, conflicting dates on his and his mother's tombstones have left Daniel's date of birth in question. On June 26, 1851, his father remarried and had another three children with Matilda Vanzant, but would later die after catching pneumonia while serving in the Confederate States Army.

Daniel was raised in the Primitive Baptist church. The company that now owns the distillery claims that Jack Daniel's was first licensed in 1866. However, in the 2004 biography Blood & Whiskey: The Life and Times of Jack Daniel, author Peter Krass maintains that land and deed records show that the distillery was not founded until 1875.

According to company histories, sometime in the 1850s, when Daniel was a boy, he went to work for a preacher, grocer, and distiller named Dan Call. The preacher, as the stories went, was a busy man, and when he saw promise in young Jack, he taught him how to run his whiskey still. However, on the company's 150th anniversary in 2016, the company revealed newly-uncovered history, that Daniel did not learn distilling from Call, but from a man named Nearest Green (sometimes spelled "Nearis") – one of Call's slaves.

== Personal life ==
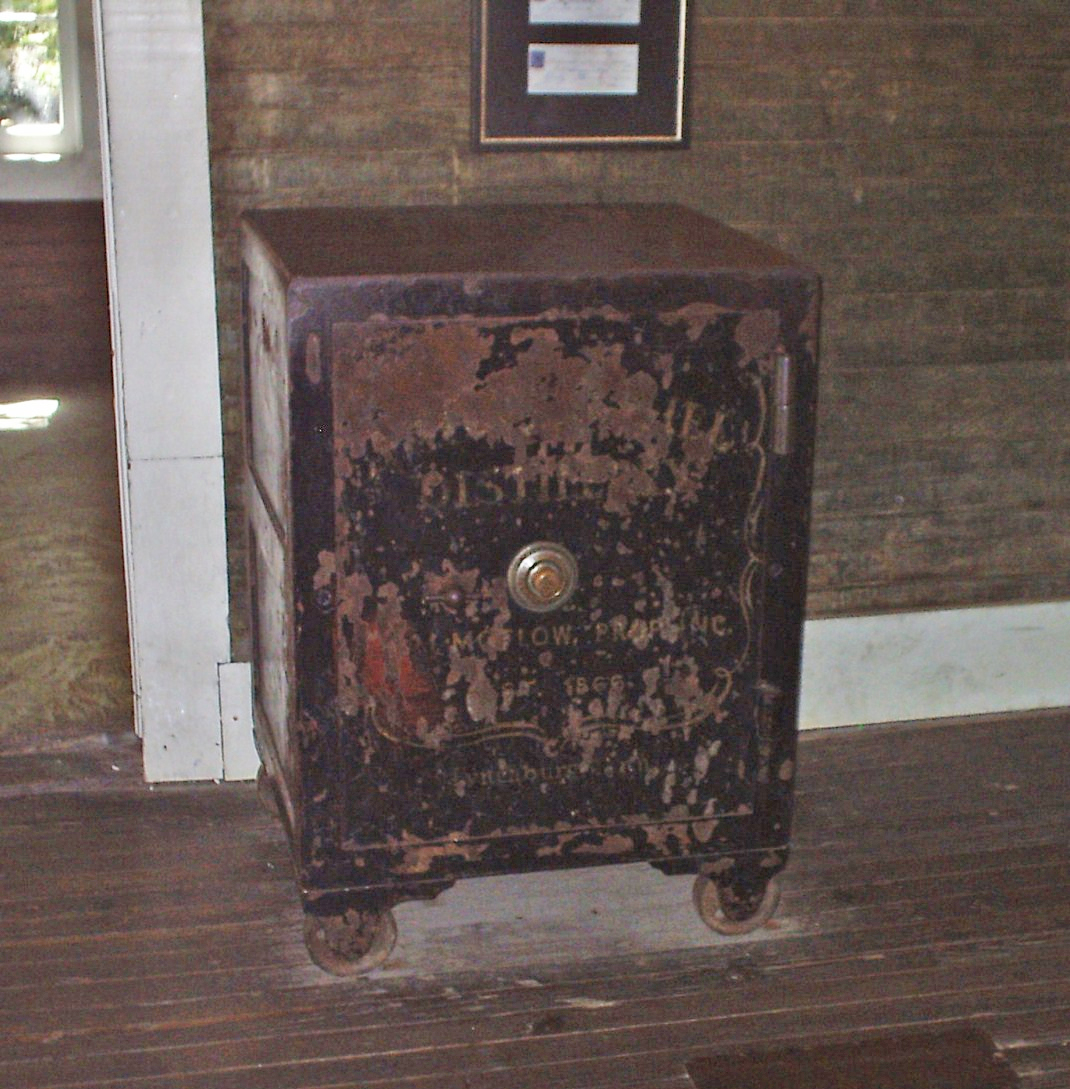
Daniel's safe

Daniel never married and did not have children. However, he took his nephews under his wing, one of whom was Lemuel "Lem" Motlow. Motlow, a son of Jack's sister Finetta, was skilled with numbers and was soon doing all of the distillery's bookkeeping.

Early in November 1893, Jack Daniel's farm outside of Lynchburg was the site of a mass murder perpetrated by a large group of mounted night riders from throughout the region, who hanged four black citizens – Ned Waggoner, his son Will and daughter Mary, and his son-in-law Sam Motlow – from a tree. The four were rumored to have been involved in a series of barn-burnings in the area; no clue was offered as to the identities of the perpetrators.

== Distillery and health ==
In 1907, due to failing health, Daniel gave the distillery over to Motlow and another one of his nephews. Motlow soon bought out the other nephew and went on to operate the business off and on for about 40 years (interrupted by Prohibition at the state level in three states starting in Tennessee in 1910 and then at the federal level from 1920 to 1933 and at the state level again until 1938, and then again between 1942 and 1946 when the U.S. government banned the manufacture of whiskey due to World War II). Motlow died in 1947.

Daniel died from blood poisoning in Lynchburg on October 9, 1911. An oft-told tall tale is that the infection began in one of his toes, which Daniel injured one morning at work by kicking his safe in anger when he could not get it open (he was said to always have had trouble remembering the combination). However, Daniel's modern biographer has asserted that the story is not true, offering evidence that Daniel raged on the safe a few years before dying of unrelated gangrene.

== See also ==
- Outline of whisky
