= Jimmy Bedford =

- Born: January 30, 1940; Franklin County, Tennessee, U.S.
- Died: August 7, 2009 (aged 69); Lynchburg, Tennessee, U.S.
- Education: Tennessee Polytechnic Institute
- Spouse: Emily
- Children: 1

James Howard Bedford (January 30, 1940 – August 7, 2009) was responsible for overseeing the production of Jack Daniel's Tennessee whiskey and ensuring the consistent flavor of the product in his 20 years serving as the distillery's sixth master distiller.

== Early life ==
Bedford was born on January 30, 1940, in Franklin County, Tennessee, and grew up on a farm in Lynchburg, Tennessee. There he attended Moore County High School. He attended Tennessee Polytechnic Institute, where he met his future wife, graduating from the school in 1962.

== Career ==
He and his wife moved back to the Lynchburg area following graduation from college and took a job in 1968 at the Jack Daniel's Distillery there. He learned the various details of the production process and was named as the company's sixth master distiller in 1988, where he was responsible for supervising the "milling, yeasting, fermenting and distilling" involved in making the whiskey using a network of fermenters, stills, and vats. According to his obituary in The New York Times, he had "what he considered one of the most enviable jobs imaginable — making sure Jack Daniel's Old No. 7 Tennessee Whiskey tasted just the way it had since 1866". Bedford would compare new batches with old by sipping, but not swallowing, samples of the product to ensure that "it never changes" and that Jack Daniel's Old No. 7 remained "the biggest constant in Lynchburg".

As part of his position, Bedford appeared in advertisements describing his role and did promotional tours and tasting seminars worldwide. Bedford oversaw the introduction of two brand extensions: Jack Daniel's Single Barrel, which was less sweet and smoky than the original, and Gentleman Jack, introduced in 1988 as a "superpremium" brand. He left the distillery in 2008 after being the subject of a $3.5 million sexual harassment lawsuit. His successor, as the seventh master distiller at Jack Daniel's, was Jeff Arnett.

Bedford was recognized with the Icons of Whisky Lifetime Achievement Award in 2007 by Whisky magazine.

== Personal ==
Bedford died of a heart attack at age 69 on August 7, 2009, at his farm near Lynchburg. He was survived by his wife Emily, née Gregory, their only daughter, and one grandson.

Four racers at the Heluva Good! Sour Cream Dips at The Glen run on August 10, three days following his death, ran the race in Bedford's memory, with driver Casey Mears riding with a specially designed decal reading "In Memory of Jimmy Bedford" on his #07 Jack Daniel's Chevrolet Impala SS, with the decal also being placed on the cars of drivers Clint Bowyer, Jeff Burton, and Kevin Harvick.
