= Lynchburg, Tennessee =

- Consolidated city-county
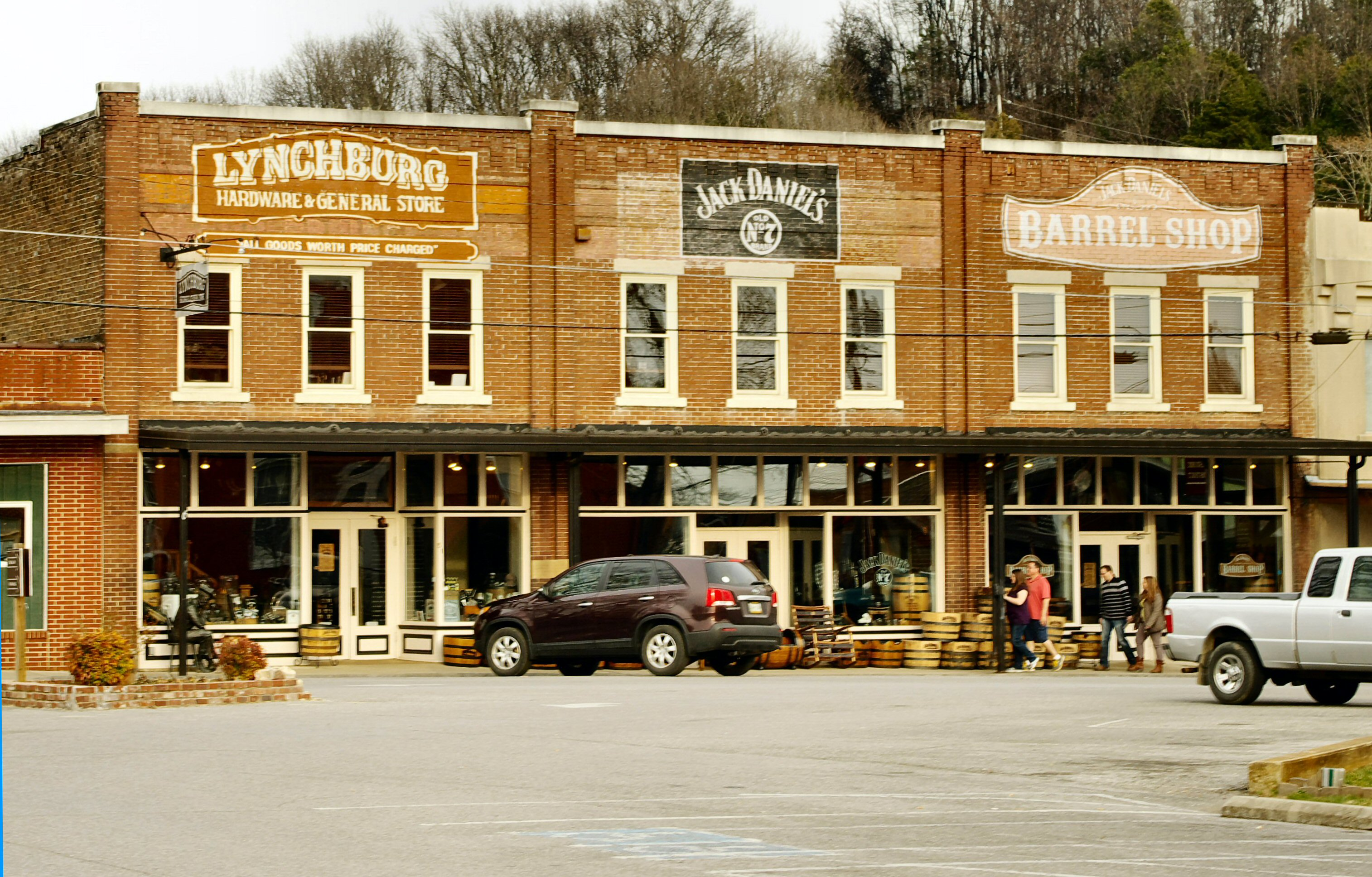
- 1913 commercial block on the courthouse square

- Location of Lynchburg in Moore County, Tennessee.

- Location within Tennessee Location within the United States
- Coordinates: 35°17′3″N 86°21′27″W
- Country: United States
- State: Tennessee
- County: Moore
- Incorporated: 1841

Area
  - Total: 131 sq mi (338 km^{2})
  - Land: 129 sq mi (335 km^{2})
  - Water: 1.2 sq mi (3 km^{2})
- Elevation: 804 ft (245 m)

Population (2020)
  - Total: 6,461
  - Density: 44/sq mi (17/km^{2})
- Time zone: UTC−06:00 (Central (CST))
  - Summer (DST): UTC−05:00 (CDT)
- ZIP code: 37352
- Area code: 931
- FIPS code: 47-44380
- GNIS feature ID: 1292342

Lynchburg is a city in the south-central region of the U.S. state of Tennessee. It is governed by a consolidated city-county government unit whose boundaries coincide with those of Moore County. Lynchburg is best known as the location of Jack Daniel's distillery, whose famous Tennessee whiskey is marketed worldwide as the product of a city with only one traffic light. Despite the operational distillery, which is a major tourist attraction, Lynchburg's home county of Moore is a dry county. However, sampling whiskey is permitted on distillery grounds. The population was 6,461 at the 2020 census.

Lynchburg is part of the Tullahoma–Manchester micropolitan area.

The downtown area is listed on the National Register of Historic Places as the Lynchburg Historic District.

== History ==
Settlers first arrived in the Lynchburg area around 1801. Main Street was originally the main road, and roughly followed the route of East Fork Mulberry Creek. Residences were generally located in the western half of Lynchburg, while industries were situated along the creek in the eastern half. One early settler, Thomas Roundtree, established a cotton mill along the creek in the vicinity of the modern Jack Daniel's Distillery. By the 1830s, another settler, William P. Long, was operating a gristmill and cotton gin. Early Lynchburg was also home to a large tannery.

The origin of the city's name is unclear. An article in an 1876 issue of the Lynchburg Sentinel suggests an early settler named the city after his native Lynchburg, Virginia. The WPA Guide to Tennessee (1939) states the city was named after an early resident named Tom Lynch. An article by Jeanne Ridgway Bigger in the spring 1972 issue of the Tennessee Historical Quarterly states that the city was named after a "Judge Lynch", who presided over a vigilante committee that met in the city sometime after the War of 1812.

During the Civil War, residents of Lynchburg generally supported the Confederacy. Company E of the Confederate Army's 1st Tennessee Cavalry consisted primarily of Lynchburg residents. A monument to the area's Confederate soldiers stands on the lawn of the Moore County Courthouse.

In 1871, Moore County was created from parts of Lincoln, Bedford, Coffee, and Franklin counties (Lynchburg had been part of Lincoln). In June 1873, Lynchburg was chosen as the county seat of Moore, due in part to its central location within the new county's boundaries. The county commissioners established a courthouse square along Main Street, the pattern of which was influenced by the square in nearby Shelbyville. Two schools, the Lynchburg Male and Female Institute and the Lynchburg Normal School, were established during this period, and several church congregations built elaborate new churches.

During the 1870s, Lynchburg was situated at the center of an agrarian economic triangle consisting of Tullahoma to the northeast, Shelbyville to the northwest, and Fayetteville to the south. As such, the city developed into an important mule trading center. The city also had a rising number of distilleries. By the 1880s, fifteen registered distilleries were operating in Moore County, with the most productive being Tom Eaton's Distillery, and the second-most productive being the now-famous Jack Daniel's. The distilleries provided a convenient market for local corn growers, and the leftover corn slop (after the alcohol was extracted) was used as feed for hogs and cattle.

On December 4, 1883, a fire destroyed nearly half of Lynchburg, including the courthouse and much of the courthouse square. A new courthouse (the present building) was completed in 1885. A separate jail (now a museum) was erected across the street in 1893. The rise of automobile traffic and the establishment of a state highway system in the early 20th century led to a commercial boom in Lynchburg, and many of the buildings on the courthouse square were built during this period. By 1920, Lynchburg had several schools and churches, a weekly newspaper, two banks, and several "flourishing business establishments".

The passage of a state law barring the manufacture of liquor in 1909 effectively shut down the city's distilleries. Although prohibition was repealed at the federal level in 1933, it remained in effect in Tennessee. Lem Motlow (1869–1947), a state senator and nephew of Jack Daniel, led efforts to repeal the state's prohibition laws. In 1937, the state repealed the law barring the manufacture of alcoholic beverages, and Motlow reopened the Jack Daniel's Distillery. In 1939, the state passed a "local option" law, allowing each county to choose (via referendum) whether or not to allow the sale of alcoholic beverages.

Motlow State Community College opened its campus in 1969 on 187 acres of land donated by Reagor Motlow and family in the northern part of Moore County in what is today part of Lynchburg.

== Geography ==
Lynchburg is located at 35°17′3″N 86°21′27″W.

According to the United States Census Bureau, the city has a total area of 130.4 square miles (337.7 km^{2}), of which 129.2 square miles (334.6 km^{2}) is land and 1.2 square miles (3.1 km^{2}) (0.93%) is water. The city lies in a valley carved by East Fork Mulberry Creek (part of the Elk River watershed). State Route 55, known as Majors Boulevard in Lynchburg, is the city's main thoroughfare. Just south of Lynchburg, this highway intersects two other highways: State Route 50 (which continues southwest to Fayetteville) and State Route 129 (which continues westward to Petersburg).

=== Climate ===
Climate data for Lynchburg, Tennessee, 1991–2020 normals, extremes 1999–present
| Month | Jan | Feb | Mar | Apr | May | Jun | Jul | Aug | Sep | Oct | Nov | Dec | Year |
|---|---|---|---|---|---|---|---|---|---|---|---|---|---|
| Record high °F (°C) | 77 (25) | 83 (28) | 85 (29) | 90 (32) | 93 (34) | 108 (42) | 107 (42) | 102 (39) | 99 (37) | 96 (36) | 87 (31) | 76 (24) | 108 (42) |
| Mean maximum °F (°C) | 68.4 (20.2) | 72.2 (22.3) | 79.6 (26.4) | 85.9 (29.9) | 90.1 (32.3) | 95.6 (35.3) | 96.2 (35.7) | 95.9 (35.5) | 92.8 (33.8) | 86.9 (30.5) | 77.3 (25.2) | 69.8 (21.0) | 97.5 (36.4) |
| Mean daily maximum °F (°C) | 48.5 (9.2) | 52.9 (11.6) | 61.8 (16.6) | 71.3 (21.8) | 79.4 (26.3) | 86.1 (30.1) | 89.3 (31.8) | 88.6 (31.4) | 83.2 (28.4) | 73.3 (22.9) | 61.1 (16.2) | 51.5 (10.8) | 70.6 (21.4) |
| Daily mean °F (°C) | 37.8 (3.2) | 40.9 (4.9) | 48.8 (9.3) | 57.2 (14.0) | 66.3 (19.1) | 74.2 (23.4) | 77.7 (25.4) | 76.4 (24.7) | 70.4 (21.3) | 58.9 (14.9) | 47.8 (8.8) | 40.4 (4.7) | 58.1 (14.5) |
| Mean daily minimum °F (°C) | 27.0 (−2.8) | 29.0 (−1.7) | 35.8 (2.1) | 43.2 (6.2) | 53.1 (11.7) | 62.3 (16.8) | 66.0 (18.9) | 64.3 (17.9) | 57.5 (14.2) | 44.6 (7.0) | 34.5 (1.4) | 29.3 (−1.5) | 45.5 (7.5) |
| Mean minimum °F (°C) | 8.4 (−13.1) | 12.9 (−10.6) | 19.5 (−6.9) | 28.6 (−1.9) | 36.6 (2.6) | 51.0 (10.6) | 55.9 (13.3) | 54.6 (12.6) | 44.1 (6.7) | 28.4 (−2.0) | 18.4 (−7.6) | 15.1 (−9.4) | 6.7 (−14.1) |
| Record low °F (°C) | −1 (−18) | 1 (−17) | 12 (−11) | 25 (−4) | 31 (−1) | 45 (7) | 50 (10) | 47 (8) | 35 (2) | 21 (−6) | 13 (−11) | 0 (−18) | −1 (−18) |
| Average precipitation inches (mm) | 5.45 (138) | 5.21 (132) | 6.14 (156) | 5.59 (142) | 5.25 (133) | 5.55 (141) | 4.74 (120) | 4.63 (118) | 4.61 (117) | 3.55 (90) | 4.77 (121) | 6.76 (172) | 62.25 (1,580) |
| Average snowfall inches (cm) | 0.3 (0.76) | 0.6 (1.5) | 0.5 (1.3) | 0.0 (0.0) | 0.0 (0.0) | 0.0 (0.0) | 0.0 (0.0) | 0.0 (0.0) | 0.0 (0.0) | 0.0 (0.0) | 0.0 (0.0) | 0.1 (0.25) | 1.5 (3.81) |
| Average precipitation days (≥ 0.01 in) | 10.9 | 11.7 | 12.0 | 11.0 | 12.3 | 11.1 | 11.6 | 10.0 | 7.8 | 9.0 | 9.9 | 12.1 | 129.4 |
| Average snowy days (≥ 0.1 in) | 0.4 | 0.5 | 0.3 | 0.0 | 0.0 | 0.0 | 0.0 | 0.0 | 0.0 | 0.0 | 0.0 | 0.2 | 1.4 |
Source 1: NOAA
Source 2: National Weather Service (mean maxim/minima 2006–2020)

== Demographics ==
Historical population
| Census | Pop. | Note | %± |
|---|---|---|---|
| 1880 | 345 | | — |
| 1890 | 500 | | 44.9% |
| 1900 | 417 | | −16.6% |
| 1910 | 408 | | −2.2% |
| 1920 | 365 | | −10.5% |
| 1930 | 380 | | 4.1% |
| 1940 | 390 | | 2.6% |
| 1950 | 401 | | 2.8% |
| 1960 | 396 | | −1.2% |
| 1970 | 538 | | 35.9% |
| 1980 | 668 | | 24.2% |
| 1990 | 4,721 | | 606.7% |
| 2000 | 5,740 | | 21.6% |
| 2010 | 6,319 | | 10.1% |
| 2020 | 6,461 | | 2.2% |

The 2020 census showed 6,461 people in Lynchburg. At the 2000 census, there were 5,740 people, 2,211 households and 1,686 families residing in Lynchburg-Moore County. The population density was 44.4 inhabitants per square mile (17.1/km^{2}). There were 2,515 housing units at an average density of 19.5 per square mile (7.5/km^{2}). The racial makeup was 95.84% White, 2.72% African American, 0.19% Native American, 0.14% Asian, 0.51% from other races, and 0.61% from two or more races. Hispanics and Latinos of any race were 0.78% of the population.

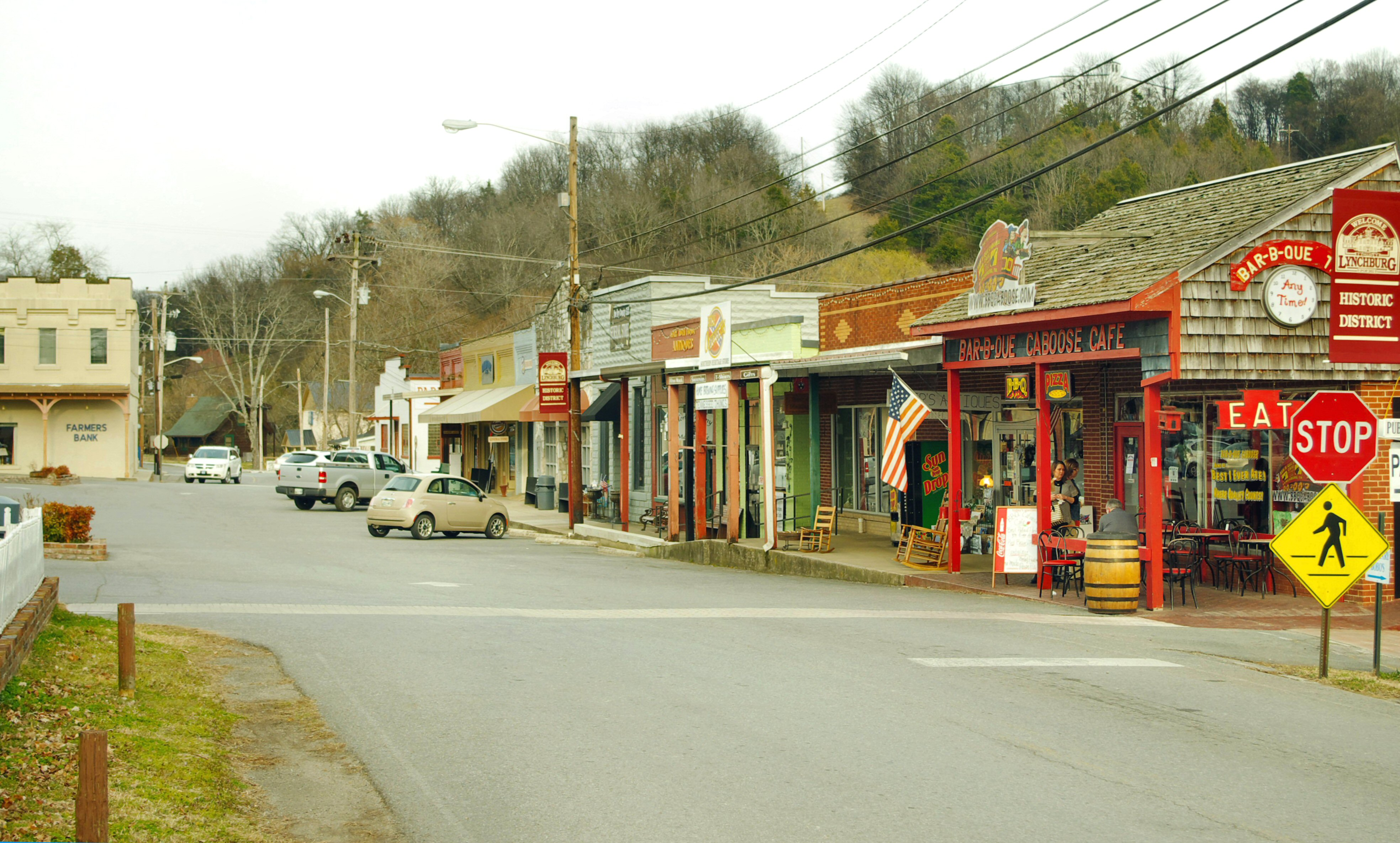
Shops along Main Street

There were 2,211 households, of which 30.7% had children under the age of 18 living with them, 65.1% were married couples living together, 7.6% had a female householder with no husband present, and 23.7% were non-families. 21.4% of all households were made up of individuals, and 11.1% had someone living alone who was 65 years of age or older. The average household size was 2.55 and the average family size was 2.95.

The age distribution was 23.3% under the age of 18, 8.4% from 18 to 24, 26.5% from 25 to 44, 26.3% from 45 to 64, and 15.5% who were 65 years of age or older. The median age was 40 years. For every 100 females, there were 98.1 males. For every 100 females age 18 and over, there were 97.8 males.

The median household income in Lynchburg-Moore County was $36,591 and the median family income was $41,484. Males had a median income of $31,559 and females $20,987. The per capita income was $19,040. About 7.8% of families and 9.6% of the population were below the poverty line, including 11.7% of those under the age of 18 and 12.1% ages 65 or older.

== Government ==
In 1988, the Metropolitan Government of Lynchburg, Moore County, Tennessee was voted into law as the governing body of Moore County, including Lynchburg. This helped reduce costs and duplicate roles.

== Education ==
Schools in Lynchburg are a part of Lynchburg-Moore County Schools:

- Lynchburg Elementary - grades PreK–6
- Moore County High School - grades 7–12

== Notable people ==
- Jimmy Bedford (1940–2009), sixth master distiller at Jack Daniel's.
- Victoria Eady Butler, master blender of Uncle Nearest Premium Whiskey and first Black woman to be a master blender
- Davy Crockett (1786–1836), American frontiersman, who lived in what is now Lynchburg from 1811 to 1813.
- Bill Dance (born 1940), angler and host of Bill Dance Outdoors, who resided in Lynchburg during the summers of his childhood and learned to fish in Lynchburg's Mulberry Creek.
- Jasper Newton Daniel, aka Jack Daniel (1846–1911), founder of Jack Daniel's Distillery.
- Nathan "Nearest" Green (c.1820–?), former slave, a distiller who trained and worked with Jack Daniel's.
- Little Richard (1932–2020), American rock and roll artist, resided in Lynchburg.
- Bobby Majors (born 1949), Tennessee Volunteers and NFL football player
- Johnny Majors (born 1935), College Football Hall of Fame, All-American tailback at the University of Tennessee and head coach of the Iowa State Cyclones from 1968 to 1972, Pittsburgh Panthers 1973–76, 1993–96, and the Tennessee Volunteers 1977–1992.
- Shirley Majors (1913–1981), patriarch of the Majors football family and former head coach at Sewanee: The University of the South from 1957 to 1977.
- Lem Motlow (1869–1947), nephew of Jack Daniel and second owner of Jack Daniel's Distillery, who also served in the Tennessee House of Representatives and the Tennessee Senate.
- Reagor Motlow (1898–1978), great-nephew of Jack Daniel and co-owner with his siblings of Jack Daniel's Distillery. Motlow also served in the Tennessee House of Representatives and the Tennessee Senate.
- F. E. Riddle (born 1870), American attorney born in Lynchburg and studied law under Judge Samuel A. Billingsley, moved to Oklahoma and became a Justice of the Oklahoma Supreme Court.
