= Moore County, Tennessee =

County in Tennessee, United States

- County
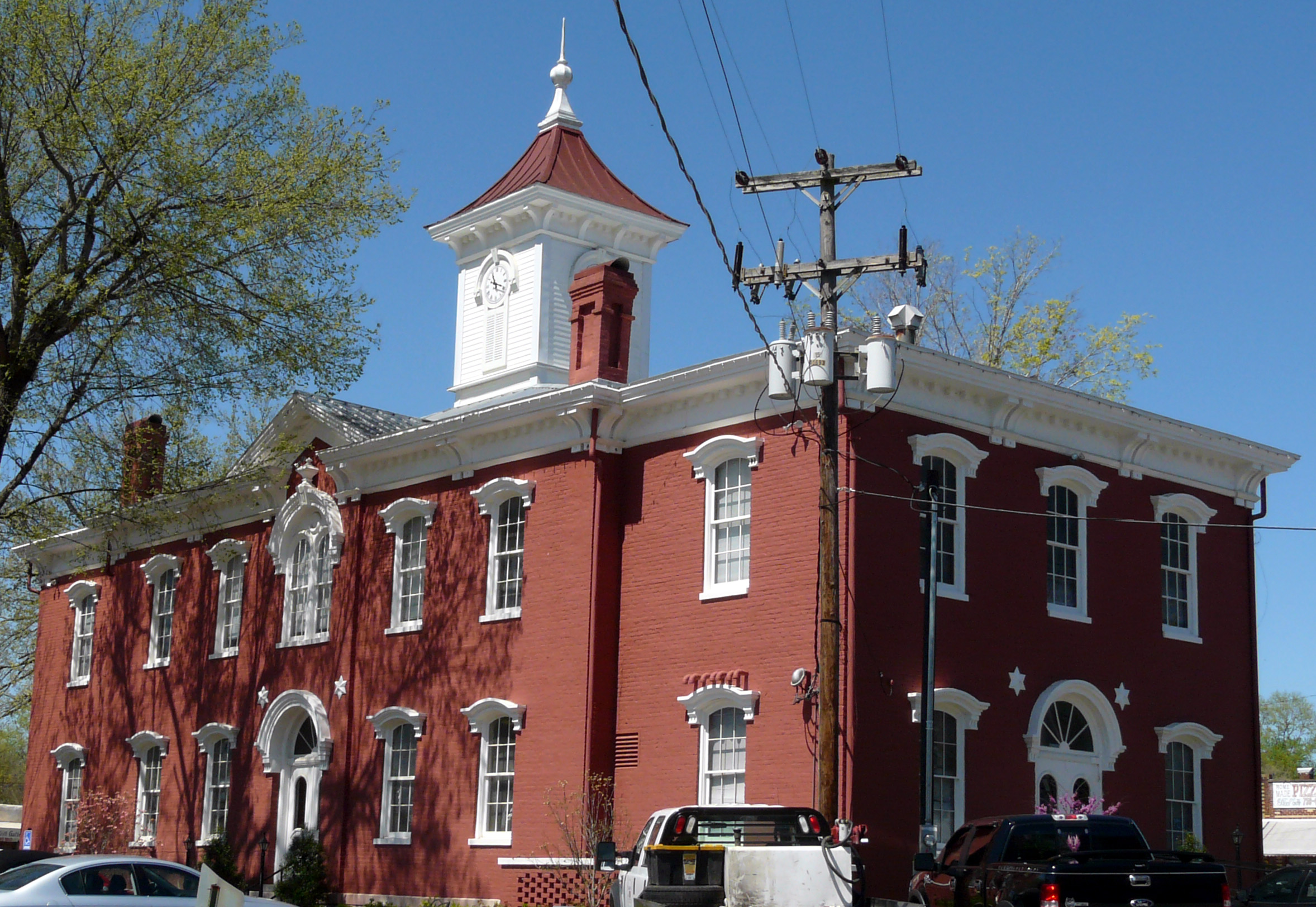
- Moore County Courthouse in Lynchburg

- Location within the U.S. state of Tennessee
- Coordinates: 35°17′N 86°22′W
- Country: United States
- State: Tennessee
- Founded: 1871
- Named for: William Moore, state legislator
- Seat: Lynchburg
- Largest city: Lynchburg

Government
  - Mayor: Sloan Stewart (R)

Area
  - Total: 130 sq mi (340 km^{2})
  - Land: 129 sq mi (330 km^{2})
  - Water: 1.2 sq mi (3.1 km^{2}) 0.9%

Population (2020)
  - Total: 6,461
  - Estimate (2025): 6,920 ▲
  - Density: 49/sq mi (19/km^{2})
- Time zone: UTC−6 (Central)
  - Summer (DST): UTC−5 (CDT)
- Congressional district: 4th
- Website: https://metromoorecounty.org/

Moore County is a county located in the south central part of the U.S. state of Tennessee. As of the 2020 census, the population was 6,461, making it the third-least populous county in Tennessee. It forms a consolidated city-county government with its county seat of Lynchburg. At 130 square miles (340 km^{2}), it is the second-smallest county in Tennessee, behind only Trousdale. The county was created in 1871, during the Reconstruction era. Moore County is part of the Tullahoma-Manchester, TN Micropolitan Statistical Area.

== History ==
Moore County was established in 1871 from parts of Lincoln, Bedford and Franklin counties, and named in honor of General William Moore, an early settler and long-time member of the state legislature. The new county originally contained about 300 square miles, but Lincoln County sued and successfully reclaimed a portion of its land, reducing the new county's size.

Beginning in the 1820s, whiskey distilleries were developed in what is now Moore County. By 1875, fifteen distilleries were operating in the county. At the end of the 20th century, the Jack Daniel Distillery in Lynchburg was a major employer and the county's primary source of revenue.

Because of the small size of this county, in the late 20th century city and county officials began to discuss creating a consolidated government in order to lower costs and improve services. In 1988, the Metropolitan Government of Lynchburg, Moore County, Tennessee was voted into law as the governing body of Moore County, including Lynchburg.

== Geography ==
According to the U.S. Census Bureau, the county has a total area of 130 square miles (340 km^{2}), of which 129 square miles (330 km^{2}) are land and 1.2 square miles (3.1 km^{2}) (0.9%) are water. It is the second-smallest county in Tennessee by area. The county is located partially on the rugged Highland Rim and partially in the flatter Nashville Basin.

=== Adjacent counties ===
- Coffee County (northeast)
- Franklin County (southeast)
- Lincoln County (southwest)
- Bedford County (northwest)

=== Protected area ===
- Tims Ford Lake

== Demographics ==
Historical population
Census	Pop.	Note	%±
1880	6,233		—
1890	5,975		−4.1%
1900	5,706		−4.5%
1910	4,800		−15.9%
1920	4,491		−6.4%
1930	4,037		−10.1%
1940	4,093		1.4%
1950	3,948		−3.5%
1960	3,454		−12.5%
1970	3,568		3.3%
1980	4,510		26.4%
1990	4,721		4.7%
2000	5,740		21.6%
2010	6,362		10.8%
2020	6,461		1.6%
2025 (est.)	6,920	▲	7.1%
U.S. Decennial Census; 1790-1960 1900-1990; 1990-2000 2010-2020 2020

=== Racial and ethnic composition ===
Moore County, Tennessee – Racial and ethnic composition Note: the US Census treats Hispanic/Latino as an ethnic category. This table excludes Latinos from the racial categories and assigns them to a separate category. Hispanics/Latinos may be of any race.
Race / Ethnicity (NH = Non-Hispanic)	Pop 1980	Pop 1990	Pop 2000	Pop 2010	Pop 2020	% 1980	% 1990	% 2000	% 2010	% 2020
White alone (NH)	4,280	4,518	5,488	6,037	5,999	94.90%	95.70%	95.61%	94.89%	92.85%
Black or African American alone (NH)	209	174	155	145	103	4.63%	3.69%	2.70%	2.28%	1.59%
Native American or Alaska Native alone (NH)	5	7	11	16	17	0.11%	0.15%	0.19%	0.25%	0.26%
Asian alone (NH)	0	2	8	24	29	0.00%	0.04%	0.14%	0.38%	0.45%
Native Hawaiian or Pacific Islander alone (NH)	x	x	0	1	1	x	x	0.00%	0.02%	0.02%
Other race alone (NH)	0	0	3	4	10	0.00%	0.00%	0.05%	0.06%	0.15%
Mixed race or Multiracial (NH)	x	x	30	65	201	x	x	0.52%	1.02%	3.11%
Hispanic or Latino (any race)	16	20	45	70	101	0.35%	0.42%	0.78%	1.10%	1.56%
Total	4,510	4,721	5,740	6,362	6,461	100.00%	100.00%	100.00%	100.00%	100.00%

=== 2020 census ===
As of the 2020 census, there were 6,461 people, 2,590 households, and 1,862 families residing in the county. The median age was 46.1 years; 20.6% of residents were under the age of 18 and 22.0% were 65 years of age or older. For every 100 females there were 97.3 males, and for every 100 females age 18 and over there were 95.3 males age 18 and over.

Of the 2,590 households, 30.0% had children under the age of 18 living in them. Of all households, 57.8% were married-couple households, 15.6% were households with a male householder and no spouse or partner present, and 20.7% were households with a female householder and no spouse or partner present. About 22.5% of all households were made up of individuals and 10.8% had someone living alone who was 65 years of age or older. There were 2,960 housing units, of which 12.5% were vacant. Among occupied housing units, 80.9% were owner-occupied and 19.1% were renter-occupied. The homeowner vacancy rate was 0.8% and the rental vacancy rate was 5.3%.

The racial makeup of the county was 93.3% White, 1.6% Black or African American, 0.4% American Indian and Alaska Native, 0.5% Asian, <0.1% Native Hawaiian and Pacific Islander, 0.4% from some other race, and 3.9% from two or more races. Hispanic or Latino residents of any race comprised 1.6% of the population.

0.1% of residents lived in urban areas, while 99.9% lived in rural areas.

=== 2010 census ===
As of the 2010 census, there were 6,362 people, 2,492 households, and 1,841 families residing in the county. There were 2,492 occupied housing units. The racial makeup of the county was 95.4% White, 2.3% Black or African American, 0.3% Native American, 0.4% Asian, 0.5% from other races, and 1.1% from two or more races. 1.1% of the population were Hispanic or Latino of any race.

There were 2,492 households, out of which 27% had children under the age of 18 living with them, 61.8% were married couples living together, 8.1% had a female householder with no husband present, and 26.1% were non-families. 22.6% of all households were made up of individuals, and 11.0% had someone living alone who was 65 years of age or older, male or female. The average household size was 2.51, and the average family size was 2.93.

In the county, the population was spread out, with 24.2% under the age of 20, 14.8% from 20 to 34, 20.5% from 35 to 49, 22.1% from 50 to 64, and 18.4% who were 65 years of age or older. The median age was 43.3 years.

=== 2000 census ===
According to the 2000 census, the median income for a household in the county was $36,591, and the median income for a family was $41,484. Males had a median income of $31,559 versus $20,987 for females. The per capita income for the county was $19,040. 9.6% of the population, and 7.8% of families were below the poverty line. 11.7% were under the age of 18, and 12.1% were 65 or older.

== Economy ==
Moore County is the location of the Jack Daniel Distillery, whose famous brand of Tennessee whiskey is marketed worldwide. Despite the distillery, Moore is a dry county. This status dates to the passage of state prohibition laws in the early 20th century.

While federal prohibition ended in 1933 with the repeal of the Eighteenth Amendment, state prohibition laws remain in effect. All Tennessee counties are dry by default, though any county can become "wet" by passing a county-wide "local option" referendum. Moore County has yet to pass such a referendum.

== Education ==
Schools in Moore County are a part of Moore County Schools, overseen by The Moore County Department of Education:

- Lynchburg Elementary School - grades PreK–6
- Moore County High School - grades 7–12

Motlow State Community College is located in northern part of Moore County.

== Politics ==
Moore County, like much of Middle Tennessee, was historically Democratic, but it began trending Republican in the latter half of the 20th century as political realignment took hold across the South. In recent decades the county has become solidly Republican in statewide and national elections. The last Democratic presidential candidate to carry Moore County was Bill Clinton in 1996.

United States presidential election results for Moore County, Tennessee
Year	Republican		Democratic		Third party(ies)	
Year	No.	%	No.	%	No.	%
1912	116	14.11%	694	84.43%	12	1.46%
1916	71	8.95%	722	91.05%	0	0.00%
1920	90	15.33%	497	84.67%	0	0.00%
1924	41	7.64%	492	91.62%	4	0.74%
1928	133	23.29%	431	75.48%	7	1.23%
1932	65	6.53%	923	92.67%	8	0.80%
1936	101	12.24%	719	87.15%	5	0.61%
1940	106	10.79%	869	88.49%	7	0.71%
1944	143	16.16%	742	83.84%	0	0.00%
1948	102	12.27%	523	62.94%	206	24.79%
1952	354	30.00%	826	70.00%	0	0.00%
1956	270	23.14%	893	76.52%	4	0.34%
1960	313	26.37%	863	72.70%	11	0.93%
1964	264	20.34%	1,034	79.66%	0	0.00%
1968	224	15.71%	346	24.26%	856	60.03%
1972	608	61.04%	356	35.74%	32	3.21%
1976	331	22.86%	1,101	76.04%	16	1.10%
1980	551	34.55%	993	62.26%	51	3.20%
1984	863	51.37%	808	48.10%	9	0.54%
1988	786	51.37%	731	47.78%	13	0.85%
1992	661	30.82%	1,151	53.66%	333	15.52%
1996	846	42.73%	935	47.22%	199	10.05%
2000	1,145	49.76%	1,107	48.11%	49	2.13%
2004	1,668	60.13%	1,084	39.08%	22	0.79%
2008	2,010	68.09%	881	29.84%	61	2.07%
2012	2,053	73.35%	705	25.19%	41	1.46%
2016	2,325	79.46%	496	16.95%	105	3.59%
2020	2,888	81.60%	573	16.19%	78	2.20%
2024	3,060	83.74%	542	14.83%	52	1.42%

== Community ==
- Lynchburg

== See also ==
- National Register of Historic Places listings in Moore County, Tennessee
