= List of universities in the United Kingdom by enrolment =

This article comprises two lists of institutions in the United Kingdom ranked by the number of students enrolled in higher education courses. The first list, based on data from the academic year 2024/25, breaks down student enrolment by level of study, while the second list, from academic year 2021/22, provides a total student enrolment figure without distinguishing between undergraduate and postgraduate levels.

The statistics in both lists are confined to students studying within the United Kingdom and exclude those engaged in distance-learning or transnational education programs conducted overseas. For reference, in the 2022/23 academic year, the Higher Education Statistics Agency (HESA) recorded 576,705 overseas students. Universities with significant numbers of overseas students in 2018/19 included the Open University (48,805), University of London (37,850), Liverpool (22,645), Liverpool John Moores (21,780), and Coventry (21,085).

== Universities and other higher education providers by size and level of study ==
The source for the figures is the Higher Education Statistics Agency (HESA) statistics for 2024/25. The student numbers include full-time and part-time, and are broken down into undergraduate and postgraduate students. Some institutes enrol students in both higher education and further education courses, so student numbers may be higher for such institutes. Numbers are of actual enrolments, not FTEs. The data show that 2.62 million people were enrolled in higher education at the 169 higher education providers reporting statistics to HESA.

Rank	Institution	Undergraduates	Postgraduates	Total students	FTE students
–	University of London (Note: The University of London is a confederal organisation made up of a number of constituent colleges which, along with the University's central institutions and activities, are listed separately.)			253,400	250,400
1	The Open University	117,695	6,885	124,580	45,175
2	University College London (Note: Constituent college of the University of London.)	25,705	25,610	51,315	—N/a
3	University of Manchester	30,565	15,735	46,305	42,890
4	University of Edinburgh	25,790	13,225	39,015	36,185
5	Manchester Metropolitan University	32,300	7,100	39,395	35,870
6	King's College London	23,200	17,670	40,870	35,150
7	Nottingham Trent University	29,865	5,575	35,435	32,170
8	Canterbury Christ Church University	35,395	2,990	38,385	34,655
9	University of Glasgow	24,300	14,410	38,710	34,500
10	University of Leeds	26,155	8,425	34,580	33,635
11	University of Birmingham	25,530	14,500	40,025	34,790
12	University of Nottingham	28,415	8,050	36,460	34,610
13	University of the West of England	25,070	11,310	36,380	29,410
14	Anglia Ruskin University	25,140	9,230	34,370	28,160
15	Cardiff University	24,645	6,860	31,505	28,020
16	University of Exeter	23,500	9,605	33,105	28,995
17	Sheffield Hallam University	21,990	8,775	30,765	25,285
18	University of Bristol	23,865	8,570	32,435	30,510
19	Ulster University	21,005	11,910	32,915	27,005
20	Birmingham City University	24,455	7,420	31,875	27,315
21	University of Sheffield	20,215	8,065	28,280	26,870
22	University of Liverpool	23,490	7,560	31,050	28,215
23	Northumbria University	20,750	8,935	29,685	25,645
24	University of Warwick	19,475	8,405	27,880	25,685
25	Coventry University	19,700	9,805	29,505	25,020
26	Newcastle University	21,245	5,985	27,230	26,255
27	Liverpool John Moores University	20,275	5,380	25,650	22,350
28	University of Oxford	14,355	11,865	26,225	21,840
29	University of Salford	18,975	7,050	26,030	22,810
30	Queen Mary, University of London	16,520	8,120	24,640	23,100
31	University of Southampton	17,645	8,140	25,785	24,340
32	University of Central Lancashire	17,225	6,640	23,865	19,245
33	De Montfort University	17,340	5,815	23,155	19,555
34	Teesside University	12,960	8,610	21,570	16,455
35	Queen's University Belfast	18,210	6,870	25,080	21,740
36	University of Portsmouth	17,965	6,050	24,015	20,730
37	Leeds Beckett University	16,295	5,995	22,290	19,365
38	University of South Wales		6,015	20,790	16,750
39	University of Strathclyde	14,515	7,710	22,225	19,810
40	University of the Arts London	16,555	6,395	22,950	20,625
41	University of Cambridge	13,345	9,220	22,565	21,040
42	City, University of London	19,470	7,760	27,230	23,510
43	University of York	16,015	6,330	22,345	20,360
44	Imperial College London	12,080	10,440	22,525	21,310
45	University of Westminster	17,615	3,325	20,940	18,865
46	Glasgow Caledonian University	15,525	6,680	22,205	18,340
47	Durham University	16,560	4,590	21,150	20,650
48	Swansea University	15,000	3,985	18,985	17,165
49	University of East London	15,045	11,710	26,755	21,500
50	University of Derby	14,475	4,420	18,895	13,885
51	University of Reading	14,125	7,240	21,370	17,425
52	University of Lincoln	12,830	6,725	19,560	14,265
53	University of Huddersfield	12,865	3,495	16,360	12,615
54	University of Sunderland	14,430	5,850	20,280	16,660
55	University of Wolverhampton	15,970	7,695	23,665	15,945
56	University of Bath	15,995	4,535	20,530	18,955
57	Buckinghamshire New University	16,585	1,905	18,490	17,070
58	University of Plymouth	14,460	3,485	17,945	15,880
59	University of Sussex	12,920	4,375	17,290	15,980
60	Staffordshire University	14,600	2,485	17,085	14,135
61	Kingston University	14,805	4,010	18,815	17,075
62	Loughborough University	15,490	3,470	18,955	18,030
63	Bournemouth University	12,705	4,155	16,860	14,325
64	Aston University	14,430	5,135	19,565	15,855
65	University of Leicester	14,675	4,315	18,990	17,370
66	University of West London	12,980	4,710	17,690	15,670
67	University of East Anglia	12,535	4,410	16,945	14,855
68	Lancaster University	13,935	4,685	18,620	16,840
69	University of Kent	13,340	2,730	16,070	14,440
70	London South Bank University	12,460	3,300	15,760	12,755
71	University of the West of Scotland	12,760	6,345	19,105	16,510
72	University of Brighton	14,150	3,255	17,405	14,625
73	University of Northampton	10,685	2,820	13,505	12,355
74	University of Surrey	12,500	3,930	16,430	15,195
75	University of Essex	9,310	4,710	14,015	12,205
76	Middlesex University	10,465	4,555	15,020	12,545
77	University of Wales Trinity Saint David	12,800	2,615	15,415	12,555
78	University of Hull	9,035	5,680	14,715	12,165
79	University of Aberdeen	9,815	4,115	13,930	12,115
80	University of Dundee	9,785	3,650	13,435	11,820
81	Leeds Trinity University	12,430	1,285	13,715	12,780
82	London Metropolitan University	10,030	3,635	13,665	11,200
83	Robert Gordon University	10,150	4,690	14,840	9,800
84	Edinburgh Napier University	10,255	3,550	13,805	12,705
85	University of Chester	8,215	5,305	13,520	11,790
86	Edge Hill University	9,790	3,540	13,330	10,915
87	University of Suffolk	12,600	990	13,590	11,665
88	University of Bedfordshire	6,705	2,295	9,000	8,275
89	Keele University	9,990	3,695	13,680	10,850
90	Royal Holloway, University of London	10,935	2,180	13,115	12,445
91	London School of Economics	5,785	7,160	12,950	12,590
92	University of Stirling	8,700	3,045	11,750	10,270
93	University of Bradford	7,830	2,940	10,770	9,400
94	Roehampton University	7,085	4,865	11,945	10,200
95	University of Bolton	7,835	4,740	12,570	10,825
96	University of St Andrews	9,180	2,460	11,645	10,800
97	University for the Creative Arts	13,955	1,155	15,110	13,815
98	Cardiff Metropolitan University	9,410	2,855	12,265	11,030
99	York St John University	7,320	4,830	12,150	11,175
100	Bangor University	6,665	3,270	9,935	8,280
101	Heriot-Watt University	6,890	2,955	9,845	8,940
102	Solent University	7,825	685	8,515	7,605
103	University of the Highlands and Islands	7,325	1,355	8,685	6,140
104	University of Cumbria	6,525	2,540	9,065	6,400
105	University of Worcester	6,840	1,915	8,755	7,525
106	Wrexham Glyndŵr University	4,955	3,605	8,560	4,980
107	Birkbeck, University of London	4,495	3,225	7,720	5,805
108	Goldsmiths, University of London	4,490	3,420	7,910	6,915
109	Aberystwyth University	7,375	1,590	8,970	6,515
110	University of Gloucestershire	5,570	2,560	8,135	6,740
111	University of Winchester	5,880	965	6,840	6,135
112	St Mary's University, Twickenham	3,905	2,055	5,965	5,160
113	University of Chichester	4,595	1,780	6,375	5,475
114	Queen Margaret University	3,830	2,760	6,590	5,165
115	University College Birmingham	5,730	1,030	6,760	6,245
116	School of Oriental and African Studies	4,315	2,085	6,400	5,990
117	Harper Adams University	4,640	650	5,285	3,180
118	Liverpool Hope University	4,425	905	5,330	4,850
119	Cranfield University	455	4,550	5,000	2,590
120	Abertay University	3,815	1,175	4,990	3,895
121	Newman University	4,775	725	5,500	4,750
122	Arts University Bournemouth	3,395	345	3,740	3,575
123	St George's, University of London	n/a	n/a	n/a	n/a
124	University of London (Institutes and activities)	1,535	1,745	3,280	1,365
125	University of Buckingham	1,810	1,645	3,455	2,915
126	Norwich University of the Arts	2,645	120	2,765	2,655
127	Royal College of Art	145	2,405	2,555	2,460
128	University of St Mark and St John	4,190	660	4,850	3,865
129	Glasgow School of Art	1,970	870	2,845	2,720
130	Royal Veterinary College	2,120	455	2,575	2,305
131	Hartpury University	2,265	280	2,550	2,345
132	Bishop Grosseteste University	1,845	515	2,360	2,005
133	London Business School		2,275	2,275	1,705
134	Leeds Arts University	2,085	95	2,175	2,095
135	SRUC	1,695	125	1,820	1,425
136	Stranmillis University College	1,055	375	1,430	1,105
137	Arts University Plymouth	1,535	75	1,610	1,230
138	Royal Conservatoire of Scotland	870	360	1,230	1,155
139	Trinity Laban Conservatoire of Music and Dance	965	350	1,315	1,205
140	Leeds College of Music	1,240	60	1,300	1,285
141	Guildhall School of Music and Drama	665	385	1,050	990
142	The Liverpool Institute for Performing Arts	1,050	45	1,095	1,080
143	Royal Northern College of Music	585	350	935	945
144	Grŵp Llandrillo Menai	785	45	825	505
145	Rose Bruford College	755	115	870	770
146	Royal Central School of Speech and Drama	640	375	1,015	975
147	Royal Academy of Music	385	390	775	765
148	London School of Hygiene and Tropical Medicine		945	945	735
149	Royal College of Music	490	505	995	945
150	Royal Agricultural University	760	165	925	870
151	St Mary's University College, Belfast	850	215	1,060	920
152	Writtle University College	n/a	n/a	n/a	n/a
153	AECC University College	1,335	770	2,110	1,665
154	Courtauld Institute of Art	270	360	630	610
155	University College of Osteopathy	n/a	n/a	n/a	n/a
156	National Film and Television School		585	585	455
157	Liverpool School of Tropical Medicine		210	210	135
158	Institute of Cancer Research		370	370	250
159	Gower College Swansea	30		30	5
160	Grŵp NPTC Group	110		110	65
161	Conservatoire for Dance and Drama				
162	University of Wales (central functions)	12,800	2,615	15,415	12,555

== Universities and other higher education providers by size (2021/22) ==
The data source for these statistics is also the Higher Education Statistics Agency (HESA) for the academic year 2021/22. The student figures encompass both full-time and part-time students, without distinction between undergraduate and postgraduate levels of study. Some institutions enroll students in both higher education and further education programs, potentially leading to higher student numbers in such cases. It's important to note that these statistics reflect actual student enrollments and not full-time equivalent (FTE) counts. According to the latest available data from HESA, a total of 2.86 million individuals were enrolled in higher education at the various institutions reporting data to HESA for the academic year 2021/22.

Rank	HE Provider	Total
1	The Open University	151,840
2	University College London	46,830
3	The University of Manchester	46,410
4	The University of Glasgow	42,980
5	King's College London	41,490
6	The Nottingham Trent University	41,465
7	The University of Edinburgh	41,250
8	Coventry University	38,190
9	The University of Birmingham	37,990
10	University of Nottingham	37,260
11	The University of Leeds	37,190
12	University of the West of England, Bristol	37,170
13	Manchester Metropolitan University	36,980
14	Anglia Ruskin University	35,195
15	Ulster University	34,550
16	Sheffield Hallam University	34,535
17	Cardiff University	33,985
18	University of Northumbria at Newcastle	32,570
19	The University of Exeter	32,465
20	University of Hertfordshire	31,940
21	University of Bristol	31,485
22	The University of Sheffield	30,860
23	Birmingham City University	30,285
24	The University of Warwick	28,825
25	The University of Liverpool	28,680
26	De Montfort University	28,335
27	University of Central Lancashire	28,325
28	Liverpool John Moores University	28,100
29	The University of Oxford	27,290
30	Newcastle University	27,280
31	University of Greenwich	26,610
32	University of Portsmouth	26,500
33	Queen Mary University of London	26,045
34	The University of Strathclyde	25,715
35	The University of Salford	25,415
36	Queen's University Belfast	25,295
37	Canterbury Christ Church University	24,660
38	The University of Southampton	23,795
39	The University of York	23,420
40	Leeds Beckett University	23,365
41	University of South Wales	23,270
42	Teesside University	22,695
43	The University of Cambridge	22,610
44	University of the Arts, London	22,455
45	Swansea University	22,290
46	University of Durham	22,230
47	Imperial College of Science, Technology and Medicine	21,470
48	University of Derby	20,955
49	University of Westminster	20,915
50	The University of Huddersfield	20,885
51	City, University of London	20,685
52	Buckinghamshire New University	20,570
53	University of Wolverhampton	20,250
54	University of the West of Scotland	20,070
55	Glasgow Caledonian University	20,050
56	University of Sunderland	19,975
57	Kingston University	19,920
58	The University of Sussex	19,865
59	University of East London	19,550
60	The University of Reading	19,390
61	Middlesex University	19,225
62	London South Bank University	19,185
63	The University of East Anglia	19,130
64	University of Plymouth	19,095
65	The University of Bath	18,890
66	Loughborough University	18,760
67	University of West London	18,695
68	Brunel University London	18,655
69	Staffordshire University	18,460
70	University of Kent	18,155
71	The University of Essex	18,110
72	University of Dundee	18,100
73	University of Lincoln	17,975
74	Bournemouth University	17,960
75	The University of Brighton	17,835
76	The University of Lancaster	17,770
77	Aston University	17,595
78	Oxford Brookes University	17,470
79	University of Leicester	16,670
80	The University of Aberdeen	16,565
81	University of Bedfordshire	16,430
82	The University of Northampton	16,100
83	BPP University	15,910
84	University of Surrey	15,575
85	Edinburgh Napier University	15,530
86	The University of Law	15,235
87	Arden University	15,120
88	The University of Hull	15,075
89	University of Wales Trinity Saint David	15,045
90	Robert Gordon University	14,970
91	University of Stirling	14,895
92	Edge Hill University	14,700
93	University of Suffolk	14,555
94	University of Chester	14,325
95	London Metropolitan University	13,435
96	Bath Spa University	13,240
97	London School of Economics and Political Science	12,975
98	Cardiff Metropolitan University	12,620
99	Royal Holloway and Bedford New College	12,480
100	Roehampton University	12,335
101	Keele University	12,235
102	The University of Bradford	11,885
103	University of St. Andrews	11,820
104	Heriot-Watt University	11,680
105	Leeds Trinity University	11,640
106	The University of Bolton	10,995
107	Birkbeck College	10,660
108	Bangor University	10,505
109	Solent University	10,070
110	University of the Highlands and Islands	10,005
111	University of Worcester	9,900
112	Goldsmiths College	9,880
113	University of Cumbria	9,705
114	University for the Creative Arts	9,430
115	The University of Winchester	8,280
116	University of Gloucestershire	8,210
117	York St John University	7,935
118	Aberystwyth University	7,845
119	Glyndŵr University	7,490
120	BIMM University	7,045
121	Falmouth University	6,635
122	SOAS University of London	6,295
123	Queen Margaret University	6,250
124	University of Chichester	5,985
125	St Mary's University, Twickenham	5,895
126	Liverpool Hope University	5,640
127	Cranfield University	5,400
128	Harper Adams University	5,275
129	University College Birmingham	5,170
130	St George's, University of London	4,825
131	Abertay University	4,790
132	University of London (Institutes and activities)	4,290
133	The Arts University Bournemouth	3,725
134	University of Buckingham	3,430
135	Regent College	3,160
136	Study Group	3,040
137	University College of Estate Management	3,010
138	University of St Mark and St John	2,890
139	Birmingham Newman University	2,760
140	Norwich University of the Arts	2,760
141	Royal Veterinary College	2,590
142	Ravensbourne University London	2,585
143	Royal College of Art	2,575
144	Glasgow School of Art	2,440
145	London Business School	2,390
146	Bishop Grosseteste University	2,370
147	Hartpury University	2,355
148	Leeds Arts University	2,340
149	Global Banking School Limited	1,895
150	Regent's University London	1,865
151	Kaplan, Inc.	1,835
152	SRUC	1,700
153	Hult International Business School	1,660
154	Nelson College London Ltd	1,630
155	Leeds Conservatoire	1,540
156	ICON College of Technology and Management	1,365
157	Trinity Laban Conservatoire of Music and Dance	1,340
158	Stranmillis University College	1,325
159	Royal Conservatoire of Scotland	1,245
160	Royal Agricultural University	1,240
161	The London College UCK	1,190
162	London School of Hygiene and Tropical Medicine	1,125
163	Istituto Marangoni	1,125
164	Conservatoire for Dance and Drama	1,105
165	Guildhall School of Music and Drama	1,105
166	Rose Bruford College of Theatre and Performance	1,105
167	Bloomsbury Institute	1,095
168	Royal Central School of Speech and Drama	1,085
169	Institute of Contemporary Music Performance	1,080
170	Arts University Plymouth	1,060
171	St Mary's University College	1,040
172	AECC University College	1,035
173	AA School of Architecture	1,010
174	Hult International Business School	995
175	Royal College of Music	995
176	The Liverpool Institute for Performing Arts	990
177	ACM Guildford Limited	960
178	Pearson College London	940
179	Applied Business Academy Limited	920
180	Grŵp Llandrillo Menai	910
181	Royal Northern College of Music	870
182	Writtle University College	830
183	CEG UFP Limited	805
184	Kaplan International Colleges U.K. Limited	805
185	Royal Academy of Music	790
186	Point Blank Music School	775
187	University Centre Peterborough	750
188	Mont Rose College of Management and Sciences	745
189	SAE Education Limited	745
190	London School of Management Education	725
191	Richmond, The American International University in London	695
192	ESCP Business School	605
193	Courtauld Institute of Art	600
194	National Film and Television School	555
195	Le Cordon Bleu	555
196	Met Film School	530
197	University College of Osteopathy	475
198	New College of the Humanities	470
199	St Mellitus College	465
200	The Metanoia Institute	455
201	Mountview Academy of Theatre Arts	450
202	London School of Theology	445
203	Apex College London	430
204	David Game College	405
205	Futureworks	400
206	LAMDA Limited	380
207	The Institute of Cancer Research	365
208	Arts Educational Schools	345
209	The College of Health Ltd	345
210	Queen's Foundation for Ecumenical Theological Education	340
211	London Film School	340
212	London Studio Centre	320
213	London School of Commerce & IT Ltd	295
214	The London Institute of Banking & Finance	295
215	City and Guilds of London Art School	280
216	Spurgeon's College	280
217	West Dean College	280
218	Liverpool School of Tropical Medicine	270
219	Norland College	270
220	Waverley Abbey College	250
221	London Churchill College	245
222	Institute of Art - London Limited	240
223	The City College	215
224	London School of Science and Technology Limited	215
225	The Sherwood Psychotherapy Training Institute Limited	215
226	Christ the Redeemer College	210
227	British Academy of Jewellery Limited	205
228	London Bridge Business Academy	200
229	Moorlands College	200
230	Backstage Academy (Training) Ltd	195
231	Royal Academy of Dramatic Art	195
232	The College of Integrated Chinese Medicine	185
233	Empire College London Limited	180
234	Grŵp NPTC Group	180
235	Paris Dauphine International	180
236	The Minster Centre	175
237	The Council of the Inns of Court	165
238	Northern College of Acupuncture	165
239	Regents Theological College	165
240	Trinity College Bristol	160
241	The Film Education Training Trust Limited	150
242	Nazarene Theological College, Manchester	150
243	University Centre Quayside Limited	150
244	Cambridge Theological Federation	145
245	London School of Academics Ltd	140
246	Dartington Hall Trust	130
247	The Markfield Institute of Higher Education	130
248	Matrix College of Counselling and Psychotherapy Ltd	130
249	Central Film School London	125
250	Cliff College	125
251	Royal Academy of Dance	125
252	Cambridge Arts and Sciences Limited	120
253	College of Legal Practice Limited	120
254	The London School of Architecture	115
255	Results Consortium Limited	105
256	INTO University Partnerships	100
257	ThinkSpace Education Limited	90
258	Chicken Shed Theatre Company	85
259	Luther King House Educational Trust	85
260	All Nations Christian College	85
261	College of Osteopaths	80
262	The Institute of Ismaili Studies	80
263	Missio Dei	80
264	St Patrick's International College	80
265	MLA College	75
266	Bristol Baptist College	70
267	The Islamic College	65
268	The London Interdisciplinary School Ltd	65
269	Newbold College	65
270	Amity Global Education	60
271	Gower College Swansea	50
272	Dyson Technical Training Limited	40
273	ForMission Ltd	40
274	Raindance Educational Services Ltd	40
275	The Salvation Army	40
276	Courtyard Theatre, London	35
277	New Model Institute for Technology and Engineering (NMITE)	35
278	London College of Contemporary Music	30
279	Industrial Common Ownership Movement	30
280	The Engineering and Design Institute London	25
281	JSA Education Group Ltd.	20
282	The Prince's Foundation	20
283	BRIT School	15
284	Waltham International College Limited	10
285	Kensington College of Business	5

== See also ==
- Armorial of UK universities
- List of largest universities by enrollment
- List of universities in the United Kingdom
- List of UK universities by date of foundation
- List of UK universities by endowment
