= List of universities and higher education colleges in London =

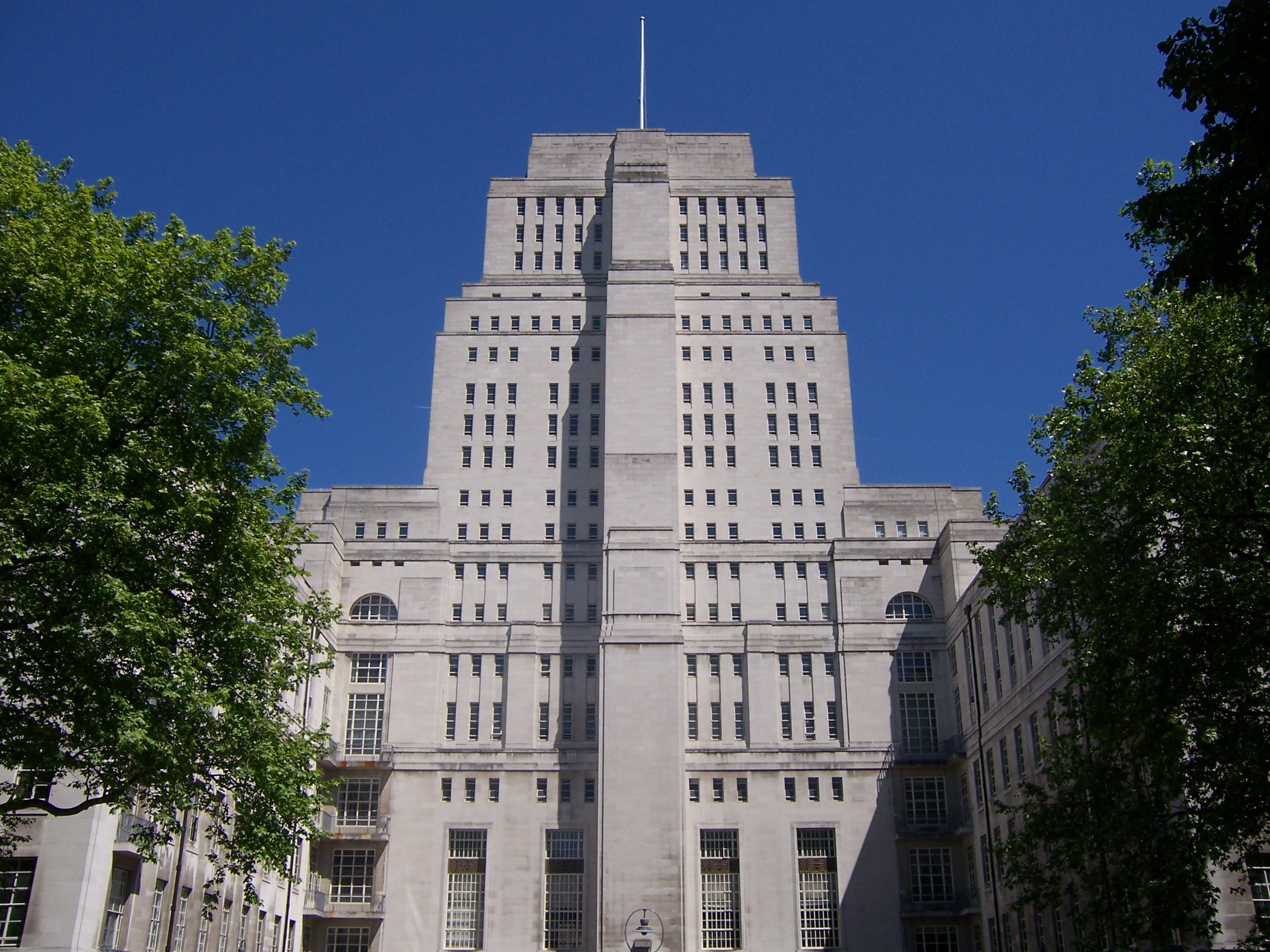
The Senate House, the headquarters of the federal University of London

London has one of the largest concentrations of universities and higher education institutions in the world. It has 40 higher education institutions (not counting foreign Universities with London branches) and has a student population of more than 400,000. Among the institutions in London are some of the old colleges that today make up the federal University of London, modern universities, as well as a number of smaller and often highly specialised universities and colleges. Additionally, over 45,000 students in over 180 countries follow the University of London External System, established in 1858.

== Universities ==
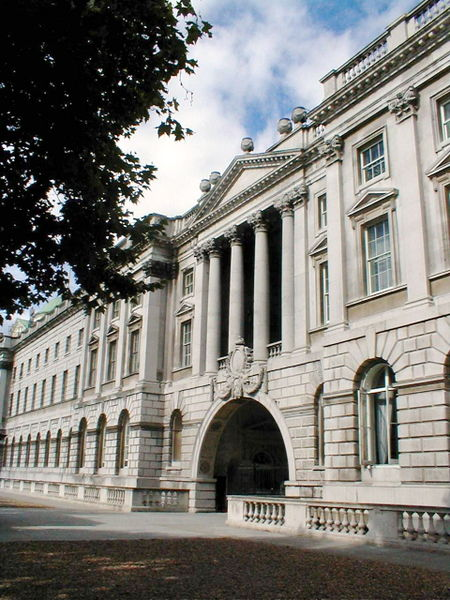
King's College London, founded in 1829 by King George IV and the Duke of Wellington, is one of the University of London's two founding colleges.

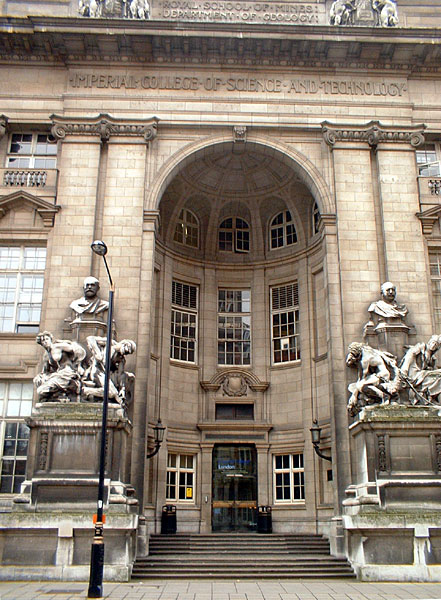
Entrance to Imperial College London

Universities are those institutions which hold university status.

Key (lower numbers are better):

- GUG: Guardian University Guide 2025 (published 2024)
- TUG: Times and Sunday Times Good University Guide 2018 (published 2017)
- CUG: Complete University Guide 2018 (published 2017)
- UoL: Part of the University of London
- QS: ranking in QS World University Rankings 2027
- THE: ranking in Times Higher Education World University Rankings 2017/2018
- Mission: University mission group (CG: Cathedrals Group, GHE: GuildHE, IHE: Independent Higher Education, MP: MillionPlus, RP: ResearchPlus, RG: Russell Group, UA: University Alliance)
- ARWU: ranking in Academic Ranking of World Universities 2017

University	GUG	TUG	CUG	UoL	QS	THE	ARWU	Mission
BIMM University
Birkbeck, University of London	113	122	115	Yes	354	301-350	—N/a	
BPP University
Brunel University of London	120	59	47	Yes ^{a}	353	351-400	401-500	RP
City St George's, University of London^{b}	38	75	42	Yes	361	351-400	—N/a	RP
Goldsmiths, University of London	109	63	51	Yes	701-710	301-350	—N/a	
Imperial College London	5	4	5	^{c}	2	8	27	RG
King's College London	28	28	21	Yes	37	36	46	RG
Kingston University	60	117	102		686	601-800	—N/a	UA
London Metropolitan University	93	128	127		1001-1200	—N/a	—N/a	MP
London School of Economics	4	11	4	Yes	62	25	151-200	RG
London South Bank University	59	106	108		901-950	801-1000	—N/a	
Middlesex University	113	91	73		901-950	401-500	—N/a	UA
Northeastern University – London
Queen Mary University of London	74	43	33	Yes	103	121	151-200	RG
Ravensbourne
Regent's University London
Richmond, The American International University in London								IHE
SOAS, University of London	90	36	38	Yes	458	401-500	—N/a	RP
St Mary's University, Twickenham	75	99	120		—N/a	—N/a	—N/a	CG, GHE
University College London	9	7	7	Yes	8	16	16	RG
University of East London	56	114	113		1001-1200	601-800	—N/a	MP
University of Greenwich	117	109	93		791-800	601-800	—N/a	UA
University of Law
University of Roehampton	110	74	69		—N/a	601-800	—N/a	CG
University of the Arts London	13	115	83		—N/a	—N/a	—N/a	GHE
University of West London	30	56	80		—N/a	—N/a	—N/a	UA
University of Westminster	119	106	95		851-900	601-800	—N/a	UA

Notes:
^{a} Member institution of the University of London from October 2024. ^{b} Formed by merger of City, University of London and St George's, University of London in 2024; historical rankings given for City. ^{c} College of the University of London until 2007.

In addition to the institutions in London, Royal Holloway, University of London in Surrey, and the University of Reading in Berkshire are members of the London Higher membership organisation for London universities. Royal Holloway is also a member institution of the University of London

== Branches of UK universities in London ==
Many universities based outside of London maintain a satellite campus in the capital.

- Anglia Ruskin University: ARU London
- Bath Spa University: Bath Spa University London (Hackney and Canary Wharf)
- Coventry University: Coventry University London and CU London (Dagenham and Greenwich)
- University of Cumbria: University of Cumbria London Campus
- Glasgow Caledonian University: GCU London
- Health Sciences University: UCO School of Osteopathy
- University of Central Lancashire: UCLan London
- Loughborough University: Loughborough University London
- Northumbria University: Northumbria University London
- Nottingham Trent University: Confetti London
- University of Portsmouth: University of Portsmouth London
- Sheffield Hallam University: Sheffield Hallam University in London
- Staffordshire University: Staffordshire University London
- University of Sunderland: University of Sunderland in London
- Teesside University: Teesside University London
- Ulster University: Ulster University London Campus
- University of Wales Trinity Saint David: UWTSD London
- University of Warwick: Warwick Business School London (The Shard)
- University of the West of Scotland: UWS London Campus
- York St John University: York St John University London Campus

== Other notable higher education colleges and institutions ==
The following institutions are registered as higher education providers with the Office for Students but do not hold university status. They are usually specialised in one or two academic fields.

Colleges and central bodies of the University of London (all can award University of London degrees; some also have their own degree awarding powers):

- Courtauld Institute of Art (History of Art) - Aldwych
- Institute of Cancer Research (Oncology) - South Kensington
- Royal Central School of Speech and Drama (Drama) - Swiss Cottage - taught degree awarding powers
- London Business School (Postgraduate Business School) - Regent's Park – research degree awarding powers
- London School of Hygiene & Tropical Medicine (Medicine) - Fitzrovia - research degree awarding powers
- Royal Academy of Music (Music) - Marylebone – taught degree awarding powers
- Royal Central School of Speech and Drama (Drama and theatre) - Hampstead - taught degree awarding powers
- Royal Veterinary College (Veterinary) - King's Cross – research degree awarding powers
- University of London School of Advanced Study (Research-led postgraduate specialisms) - Fitzrovia
  - Institute of Advanced Legal Studies
  - Institute of Classical Studies
  - Institute of Commonwealth Studies
  - Institute of English Studies
  - Institute of Modern Languages Research
  - Institute of Historical Research
  - Institute of Latin American Studies
  - Institute of Philosophy
  - Warburg Institute

Registered providers with degree awarding powers:

- Architectural Association School of Architecture – taught degree awarding powers
- ESCP Europe (Business School) London Campus - Finchley Road – taught degree awarding powers
- Guildhall School of Music and Drama (Music/Drama) - City of London - taught degree awarding powers
- Hult International Business School - taught degree awarding powers
- London Academy of Music and Dramatic Art - Barons Court - taught degree awarding powers
- London Interdisciplinary School - Whitechapel – taught degree awarding powers
- Rose Bruford College (Drama) - Sidcup - taught degree awarding powers
- Royal College of Art (Art/Design) - Kensington – research degree awarding powers
- Royal College of Music (Music) - Kensington – research degree awarding powers
- SAE Institute (Technology) - Haggerston/Dalston - taught degree awarding powers
- Trinity Laban Conservatoire of Music and Dance (Music/Dance) made up of Trinity College of Music and Laban Dance Centre - Greenwich/Deptford/New Cross - taught degree awarding powers

Registered higher education providers without their own degree-awarding powers:

- Bird College (Dance) - Sidcup
- Bloomsbury Institute (Business/IT/Postgraduate) - Fitzrovia
- British College of Osteopathic Medicine (Medicine) - Finchley Road
- Central School of Ballet - Clerkenwell
- Ealing, Hammersmith and West London College - Acton/Ealing/Hammersmith/Southall
- Istituto Marangoni (Fashion/Design) - Spitalfields
- London Contemporary Dance School - Bloomsbury
- London School of Commerce & IT (Postgraduate Business School) - Borough
- London School of Theology (Theology) - Northwood
- London Studio Centre (Dance and theatre) - North Finchley
- Mountview Academy of Theatre Arts (Drama) - Wood Green
- National Centre for Circus Arts - Shoreditch
- Rambert School of Ballet and Contemporary Dance - St Margarets
- Royal Academy of Dance (Dance) - Battersea
- Royal Academy of Dramatic Art - Fitzrovia

Unregistered higher education providers that have validation arrangements with UK universities include:

- London School of Osteopathy

== Foreign universities ==
A number of foreign university institutions operate in London without being recognised as British universities. Some are bona fide universities with their degrees validated by recognised accreditation bodies abroad or in the UK, while others are not validated at all or are validated by unrecognised accreditation agencies. Many foreign universities run study-abroad programmes based in London, but these are often restricted to students who spend the majority of their degree studying at the university campus in their own country, and are not independent university campuses. Some of the institutions offering foreign degrees or substantial study-abroad bases in London are listed below.

- Amity University [IN] London: Bedford Square campus (UK degrees validated by University of Greater Manchester)
- Arizona State University: ASU London (Clerkenwell and Canada Water)
- Booth School of Business, University of Chicago: London Conference Centre (Basinghall Street)
- Boston University: Boston University London Programmes (South Kensington)
- Brigham Young University: BYU London Centre (Bayswater)
- Center for Transnational Legal Studies, Georgetown University
- Dauphine University London: Paris Dauphine University - PSL (Islington campus)
- Fordham University: Fordham London (Clerkenwell campus)
- Hult International Business School: Global campus (Aldgate and Bloomsbury)
- Polish University Abroad (PUNO)
- New York University: NYU London (Bloomsbury)
- University of Notre Dame: Notre Dame London (Fisher Hall)
- Syracuse University: Syracuse London (Farringdon)

== See also ==
- Armorial of UK universities
- Education in London
- Education in England
- List of universities in the United Kingdom
- United Hospitals
