= List of UCAS institutions =

This is a list of UCAS institutions. The Universities and Colleges Admissions Service (UCAS) manages higher education applications in the UK, and each institution has a code for use in the application process. The list below shows current institutions registered with UCAS (as of January 2019), sorted by institution legacy codes and giving their official name (from the UCAS database) and their UCAS 'short name' (also known as the 'institution code name').

== A ==
- A14 Abingdon and Witney College (AWC)
- A20 University of Aberdeen (ABRDN)
- A30 University of Abertay Dundee (ABTAY)
- A40 Aberystwyth University (ABWTH)
- A41 ABI College (ABIC)
- A43 Access to Music (ACCM)
- A44 Accrington and Rossendale College (ARC)
- A45 College of Agriculture, Food and Rural Enterprise (CAFRE)
- A48 The Academy of Contemporary Music (ACM)
- A55 Amersham & Wycombe College (AMWYC)
- A57 Amsterdam Fashion Academy (AFC)
- A60 Anglia Ruskin University (ARU)
- A65 Anglo-European College of Chiropractic (AECC)
- A66 The Arts University Bournemouth (AUCB)
- A70 Askham Bryan College (ABC)
- A80 Aston University (ASTON)

== B ==
- B06 Bangor University (BANGR)
- B08 Barnet and Southgate College (BSC)
- B09 Barnfield College (BARNF)
- B11 Barking and Dagenham College (BARK)
- B13 University Campus Barnsley (BARNC)
- B15 Basingstoke College of Technology (BCOT)
- B16 University of Bath (BATH)
- B18 Bicton College (BICOL)
- B20 Bath Spa University (BASPA)
- B21 Bath College (BATHC)
- B22 University of Bedfordshire (BEDS)
- B23 Bedford College (BEDF)
- B24 Birkbeck, University of London (BBK)
- B25 Birmingham City University (BCITY)
- B30 Birmingham Metropolitan College (BMET)
- B32 The University of Birmingham (BIRM)
- B35 University College Birmingham (BUCB)
- B36 Bexley College (BEXL)
- B37 Bishop Burton College (BISH)
- B38 Bishop Grosseteste University (BGU)
- B39 BIMM (BIMM)
- B40 Blackburn College (BLACL)
- B41 Blackpool and The Fylde College (BLACK)
- B42 Berkshire College of Agriculture (BCA)
- B44 University of Bolton (BOLTN)
- B46 Bolton College (BOLTC)
- B49 Bournemouth and Poole College (BPCOL)
- B50 Bournemouth University (BMTH)
- B54 BPP University (BPP)
- B56 University of Bradford (BRADF)
- B60 Bradford College (BRC)
- B68 Bridgend College (BDGC)
- B70 Bridgwater and Taunton College (BRIDG)
- B72 University of Brighton (BRITN)
- B74 Brighton and Sussex Medical School (BSMS)
- B76 City College Brighton & Hove (CCBH)
- B77 Bristol, City of Bristol College (BCBC)
- B78 University of Bristol (BRISL)
- B80 Bristol, University of the West of England (BUWE)
- B81 British College of Osteopathic Medicine (BCOM)
- B83 Brooklands College (BROOK)
- B84 Brunel University London (BRUNL)
- B87 British School of Osteopathy (BSO)
- B90 University of Buckingham (BUCK)
- B92 Brooksby Melton College (BROKS)
- B93 Bury College (BURY)
- B94 Buckinghamshire New University (BUCKS)
- B97 Bromley College of Further and Higher Education (BCFHE)

== C ==
- C02 Calderdale College (CALD)
- C05 University of Cambridge (CAM)
- C06 Cambridge Education Group Limited (CSVPA)
- C09 Cambridge Regional College (CRC)
- C10 Canterbury Christ Church University (CANCC)
- C12 Canterbury College (CANT)
- C13 Capel Manor College (CMC)
- C15 Cardiff University (CARDF)
- C20 Cardiff Metropolitan University (CUWIC)
- C22 Coleg Sir Gar (CARM)
- C24 Carshalton College (CARC)
- C27 Central Bedfordshire College (CBED)
- C30 University of Central Lancashire (UCLan) (CLANC)
- C34 Central Film School London (CFSL)
- C35 The Royal Central School of Speech and Drama (CSSD)
- C39 City of Glasgow College (CGC)
- C55 University of Chester (CHSTR)
- C56 Chesterfield College (CHEST)
- C57 Chichester College (CHCOL)
- C58 University of Chichester (CHICH)
- C60 City University London (CITY)
- C64 City College Coventry (CCC)
- C65 City and Islington College (CIC)
- C69 City of Sunderland College (CSUND)
- C71 Cleveland College of Art and Design (CLEVE)
- C72 Cliff College (CLIFC)
- C74 City of London College (CLC)
- C75 Colchester Institute (CINST)
- C78 Cornwall College (CORN)
- C80 Courtauld Institute of Art (University of London)(CRT)
- C83 City College Plymouth (CPLYM)
- C85 Coventry University (COVN)
- C87 The Condé Nast College of Fashion & Design (CNCFD)
- C88 Craven College (CRAV)
- C89 Creative Academy (CRA)
- C92 University Centre Croydon (Croydon College) (CROY)
- C93 University for the Creative Arts (UCA) (UCA)
- C99 University of Cumbria (CUMB)

== D ==
- D26 De Montfort University (DEM)
- D38 Derby College (DCOL)
- D39 University of Derby (DERBY)
- D52 Doncaster College (DONC)
- D55 Duchy College (DUCHY)
- D58 Dudley College of Technology (DUDL)
- D65 University of Dundee (DUND)
- D86 Durham University (DUR)

== E ==
- E10 Ealing, Hammersmith and West London College (EHWL)
- E14 University of East Anglia (EANG)
- E28 University of East London (ELOND)
- E29 East Riding College (ERC)
- E30 Easton and Otley College (an Associate College of UEA) (EASTC)
- E32 East Surrey College (ESURR)
- E41 Edge Hotel School (EHS)
- E42 Edge Hill University (EHU)
- E56 University of Edinburgh (EDINB)
- E59 Edinburgh Napier University (ENAP)
- E70 University of Essex (ESSEX)
- E79 ESCP Europe Business School (ESCP)
- E80 European School of Osteopathy (ESO)
- E81 Exeter College (EXCO)
- E84 University of Exeter (EXETR)

== F ==
- F10 Fairfield School of Business (FSB)
- F33 Falmouth University (FAL)
- F66 University Centre Farnborough (FCOT)
- F95 Furness College (FURN)
- F98 Futureworks (FUWO)

== G ==
- G09 Gateshead College (GATE)
- G28 University of Glasgow (GLASG)
- G42 Glasgow Caledonian University (GCU)
- G43 Glasgow School of Art (GSA)
- G45 Gloucestershire College (GCOL)
- G50 University of Gloucestershire (GLOS)
- G53 Glyndwr University (GLYND)
- G56 Goldsmiths, University of London (GOLD)
- G59 Gower College Swansea (GCOLS)
- G70 University of Greenwich (GREEN)
- G74 Greenwich School of Management (GSM London) (GSM)
- G80 University Centre Grimsby (GRIMC)
- G90 Guildford College (GUILD)

== H ==
- H03 Hadlow College (HADCO)
- H04 Halesowen College (HALES)
- H07 Harrogate College (HARRC)
- H08 The College of Haringey, Enfield and North East London (CHEN)
- H11 Harrow College (HARCO)
- H12 Harper Adams University (HAUC)
- H14 Havering College of Further & Higher Education (HAVC)
- H18 Hereford College of Arts (HERE)
- H19 Heart of Worcestershire College (HWC)
- H22 Hartpury University Centre (HARTP)
- H24 Heriot-Watt University, Edinburgh (HW)
- H36 University of Hertfordshire (HERTS)
- H37 Hertford Regional College (HRC)
- H49 University of the Highlands and Islands (UHI)
- H51 Holy Cross Sixth Form College and University Centre (HCSFC)
- H54 Hopwood Hall College (HOPH)
- H60 University of Huddersfield (HUDDS)
- H65 Hugh Baird College (HBC)
- H72 University of Hull (HULL)
- H73 Hull College (HULLC)
- H75 Hull York Medical School (HYMS)
- H76 Hult International Business School (HULT)

== I ==
- I25 Institute of Contemporary Music Performance (ICMP)
- I35 Istituto Marangoni London (INMAR)
- I50 Imperial College London (IMP)
- I55 ifs University College (IFSS)
- I60 Islamic College for Advanced Studies (ICAS)

== K ==
- K01 West Kent and Ashford College (KCOLL)
- K12 Keele University (KEELE)
- K14 Kensington and Chelsea College (KCC)
- K15 Kensington College of Business (KCB)
- K16 Kendal College (KEND)
- K24 University of Kent (KENT)
- K60 King's College London (University of London) (KCL)
- K83 Kingston College (KCOL)
- K84 Kingston University (KING)
- K85 Kingston Maurward College (KMC)
- K90 Kirklees College (KIRK)
- K95 KLC School of Design (KLC)
- K96 Knowsley Community College (KNOW)

== L ==
- L01 Lewisham Southwark College (LSCO)
- L04 London Academy of Music and Dramatic Art (LAMDA)
- L05 Lakes College - West Cumbria (LCWC)
- L14 Lancaster University (LANCR)
- L17 University of Law (incorporating College of Law) (LAW)
- L21 Leeds City College (LCCOL)
- L23 University of Leeds (LEEDS)
- L24 Leeds Trinity University (LETAS)
- L27 Leeds Beckett University (LMU)
- L28 Leeds Arts University (LAD)
- L30 Leeds College of Music (UCAS) (LCM)
- L32 Leeds College of Building (LCB)
- L34 University of Leicester (LEICR)
- L36 Leicester College (LCOLL)
- L39 University of Lincoln (LINCO)
- L41 University of Liverpool (LVRPL)
- L42 Lincoln College (LINCN)
- L43 The City of Liverpool College (COLC)
- L46 Liverpool Hope University (LHOPE)
- L48 The Liverpool Institute for Performing Arts (LIVIN)
- L51 Liverpool John Moores University (LJMU) (LJM)
- L53 Coleg Llandrillo (LLC)
- L62 UCK Limited (LCUCK)
- L63 ARU London (LCA)
- L68 London Metropolitan University (LONMT)
- L70 London School of Commerce (LSC)
- L72 London School of Economics and Political Science (University of London) (LSE)
- L73 London School of Business and Management (LSBM)
- L75 London South Bank University (LSBU)
- L76 London School of Marketing Limited (LSM)
- L77 Loughborough College (LOUGH)
- L79 Loughborough University (LBRO)
- L83 LCCM (L83)

== M ==
- M10 The Manchester College (MCOL)
- M20 University of Manchester (MANU)
- M40 Manchester Metropolitan University (MMU)
- M61 Medipathways College (MEDIP)
- M62 Medway School of Pharmacy (MEDSP)
- M65 Coleg Menai (MENAI)
- M73 Met Film School (MFS)
- M80 Middlesex University (MIDDX)
- M87 Mid-Kent College of Higher and Further Education (MKENT)
- M88 Mont Rose College (MRC)
- M89 Milton Keynes College (MKCOL)
- M93 Moulton College (MOULT)
- M99 Myerscough College (MYERS)

== N ==
- N11 Nazarene Theological College (NAZ)
- N13 NPTC Group (NEATH)
- N21 University of Newcastle upon Tyne (NEWC)
- N23 Newcastle College (NCAST)
- N28 New College Durham (NCD)
- N30 New College Nottingham (NCN)
- N31 Newham College London (NHAM)
- N33 New College Stamford (NCS)
- N36 Newman University, Birmingham (NEWB)
- N38 University of Northampton (NTON)
- N39 Norwich University of the Arts (NUA)
- N41 Northbrook College Sussex (NBRK)
- N49 North East Surrey College of Technology (NESCT)
- N52 Norland Nursery Training College Limited (NNCT)
- N53 New College of the Humanities (NCHUM)
- N57 North Hertfordshire College (NHC)
- N59 Northampton College (NORCO)
- N64 North Lindsey College (NLIND)
- N77 Northumbria University (NORTH)
- N78 Northumberland College (NUMBC)
- N79 North Warwickshire and Hinckley College (NWHC)
- N82 Norwich City College of Further and Higher Education (NCC)
- N84 University of Nottingham (NOTTM)
- N85 North Kent College (NWKC)
- N91 Nottingham Trent University (NOTRE)

== O ==
- O10 University Campus Oldham (UCO)
- O11 The Open University (OU)
- O12 Oaklands College (OAK)
- O22 Oxford Business College (OBC)
- O25 Activate Learning (Oxford, Reading, Banbury & Bicester) (OXCH)
- O33 Oxford University (OXF)
- O66 Oxford Brookes University (OXFD)

== P ==
- P26 University of London Institute in Paris (PARIS)
- P34 Pearson College London (including Escape Studios) (PEARS)
- P35 Pembrokeshire College (PEMB)
- P51 Petroc (PETRO)
- P52 Peter Symonds College (PSC)
- P56 University Centre Peterborough (PETER)
- P59 Plumpton College (PLUMN)
- P60 Plymouth University (PLYM)
- P63 University of St Mark and St John (PMARJ)
- P65 Plymouth College of Art (PCAD)
- P73 Point Blank Music School (POINT)
- P80 University of Portsmouth (PORT)

== Q ==
- Q25 Queen Margaret University, Edinburgh (QMU)
- Q50 Queen Mary University of London (QMUL)
- Q75 The Queen's University Belfast (QBELF)

== R ==
- R06 Ravensbourne (RAVEN)
- R12 University of Reading (READG)
- R14 Reaseheath College (RHC)
- R18 Regent's University London (RBS)
- R20 Richmond, the American International University (RICH)
- R25 Arden University (RDI) (RDINT)
- R36 Robert Gordon University (RGU)
- R48 Roehampton University (ROE)
- R51 Rose Bruford College (ROSE)
- R52 Rotherham College of Arts and Technology (RCAT)
- R54 Royal Agricultural University, Cirencester (RAU)
- R55 Royal Academy of Dance (RAD)
- R72 Royal Holloway, University of London (RHUL)
- R84 Royal Veterinary College (University of London) (RVET)
- R86 Royal Welsh College of Music and Drama (Coleg Brenhinol Cerdd a Drama Cymru) (RWCMD)
- R88 Runshaw College (RUNSH)
- R90 Ruskin College, Oxford (RUSKC)

== S ==
- S01 SRUC (SRUC)
- S03 University of Salford (SALF)
- S05 SAE Institute (SAE)
- S06 Selby College (SELBY)
- S08 Sandwell College (SAND)
- S09 SOAS (University of London) (SOAS)
- S11 Salford City College (SALCC)
- S18 University of Sheffield (SHEFD)
- S20 South & City College Birmingham (SCCB)
- S21 Sheffield Hallam University (SHU)
- S22 Sheffield College (SCOLL)
- S23 Shrewsbury College of Arts and Technology (SHREW)
- S26 Solihull College & University Centre (SOLI)
- S27 University of Southampton (SOTON)
- S30 Southampton Solent University (SOLNT)
- S32 South Devon College (SDEV)
- S34 University Centre Sparsholt (SPAR)
- S35 Southport College (SOCO)
- S36 University of St Andrews (STA)
- S41 South Cheshire College (SCC)
- S42 Havant and South Downs College (SDC)
- S43 South Essex College, University Centre Southend and Thurrock (SEEC)
- S49 St George's, University of London (SGEO)
- S50 South Thames College (STHC)
- S51 University Centre St Helens (STHEL)
- S52 South Tyneside College (STYNE)
- S55 South Gloucestershire and Stroud College (SGSC)
- S57 Spurgeon's College (SPUR)
- S62 St. Mary's College, Blackburn (SMC)
- S64 St Mary's University, Twickenham, London (SMARY)
- S72 Staffordshire University (STAFF)
- S75 University of Stirling (STIRL)
- S76 Stockport College (STOCK)
- S78 University of Strathclyde (STRAT)
- S79 Stranmillis University College: A College of Queen's University Belfast (SUCB)
- S82 University Campus Suffolk (UCS)
- S83 Sussex Coast College Hastings (SCCH)
- S84 University of Sunderland (SUND)
- S85 University of Surrey (SURR)
- S89 Sussex Downs College (SDCOL)
- S90 University of Sussex (SUSX)
- S93 Swansea University (SWAN)
- S98 Swindon College (SWIN)

== T ==
- T10 Tameside College (TAMES)
- T20 Teesside University (TEES)
- T60 Tottenham Hotspur Foundation (THF)
- T80 University of Wales Trinity Saint David (UWTSD Carmarthen / Lampeter) (UWTSD)
- T85 Truro and Penwith College (TRURO)
- T90 Tyne Metropolitan College (TMC)

== U ==
- U10 UCFB (UCFB)
- U15 UK College of Business & Computing (UKCBC)
- U20 University of Ulster (ULS)
- U40 University of the West of Scotland (UWS)
- U65 University of the Arts London (UAL)
- U80 UCL (University College London) (UCL)
- U95 Uxbridge College (UXBC)

== V ==
- V03 Seevic College (SEEV)

== W ==
- W01 University of South Wales (USW)
- W05 University of West London (UWL)
- W08 Wakefield College (WAKEC)
- W12 Walsall College (WALS)
- W20 University of Warwick (WARWK)
- W25 Warwickshire College (WARKS)
- W35 College of West Anglia (WESTA)
- W36 West Cheshire College (WCC)
- W40 West Herts College, Watford Associate College of University of Hertfordshire (WHCW)
- W45 Vision West Nottinghamshire College (Vision University Centre) (WNC)
- W47 Weston College (WSTON)
- W50 University of Westminster (WEST)
- W51 City of Westminster College (WESCL)
- W52 Westminster Kingsway College (WESTC)
- W65 West Thames College (WTC)
- W66 Weymouth College (WEYC)
- W67 Wigan and Leigh College (WIGAN)
- W73 Wirral Metropolitan College (WMC)
- W74 Wiltshire College (WILTC)
- W75 University of Wolverhampton (WOLVN)
- W76 University of Winchester (WIN)
- W80 University of Worcester (WORCS)
- W85 Writtle College (WRITL)

== Y ==
- Y25 Yeovil College (YEOV)
- Y50 The University of York (YORK)
- Y70 York College (York) (YCOLL)
- Y75 York St John University (YSJ)
