= GuildHE =

UK educational organisation

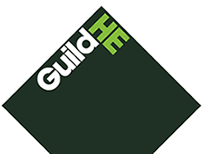
- Formation: 1967
- Type: Representative body for Higher Education
- Headquarters: London, United Kingdom
- Region served: United Kingdom
- Key people: Professor Ken Sloan (Chair); Brooke Storer-Church (CEO)
- Website: www.guildhe.ac.uk

GuildHE is an officially recognised representative body for UK higher education, championing distinction and diversity in the sector. In this role, GuildHE works alongside UUK as joint guardians of the sector to advocate for institutions within our memberships and on behalf of the entire system.

GuildHE is the most diverse representative body in the UK, serving 67 institutions across the nations and comprising universities, university colleges, further education colleges and specialist institutions. Members are small and large, rural and urban, practice-based and online, publicly and privately funded. Members are principally focused on vocational and technical higher education and include major providers of professional programmes in education and community service; healthcare; agriculture, food, and the built environment; business and law; and the creative arts.

The Chair of GuildHE is Professor Ken Sloan, the Vice Chancellor of Harper Adams University.

It is a company limited by guarantee and a charity. It was founded in the late 1970s as the Standing Conference of Principals, registered as a company in 1992 and was renamed as GuildHE in 2006.

== Members ==
Full Members

- Abertay University
- Arts University Bournemouth
- Arts University Plymouth
- AECC University College
- Bath Spa University
- Birmingham Newman University
- Bishop Grosseteste University Lincoln
- Buckinghamshire New University
- Falmouth University
- Harper Adams University
- Leeds College of Art
- Leeds Trinity University
- Norwich University of the Arts
- Ravensbourne University London
- Rose Bruford College
- Royal Agricultural University
- Royal Central School of Speech and Drama
- Solent University
- St. Mary's University College (Belfast)
- St Mary's University, Twickenham
- The Anglo-European College of Chiropractic
- The Liverpool Institute for Performing Arts
- The University of Law
- University College Birmingham
- University College of Osteopathy
- University for the Creative Arts
- University of Chichester
- University of St Mark & St John
- University of Suffolk
- University of Winchester
- University of Worcester
- Writtle University College
- York St John University

Associate Members

- Academy of Live Recorded Arts (ALRA)
- Bradford College
- British and Irish Modern Music Institute
- GSM London
- Hartpury College
- Hereford College of Arts
- SAE Institute
- The Northern School of Art
- UCFB
