= British School of Business Armenia =

- Type: Private
- Established: September 24, 2014; 11 years ago
- Affiliations: London School of Commerce; Anglia Ruskin University; Armenian State University of Economics
- Director: Lilya Hovhannisyan
- Location: Yerevan, Armenia; 40°11′03″N 44°31′31″E
- Campus: Urban
- Website: bsbarmenia.am

British School of Business Armenia (BSB Armenia) (Armenian: Բրիտանական Բիզնես Դպրոց Հայաստան), is an associate university of the global London School of Commerce (LSC) Group of Colleges, located in Yerevan, the capital of Armenia. The school provides internationally recognized British degrees in Armenia, in association with the Anglia Ruskin University and the Armenian State University of Economics. It is located on Nalbandyan Street of Kentron District, Yerevan.

== Overview ==
In December 2013, the Armenian State University of Economics (ASUE) and the Globe Education (GB) LTD jointly announced about their intention to open the BSB Armenia campus in Yerevan. Within less than a year, the inauguration of the BSB Armenia Yerevan campus took place on September 24, 2014, with the presence of then-Prime Minister of Armenia Hovik Abrahamyan, the Rector of the Armenian State University of Economics Professor Koryun Atoyan, and the British Ambassador to Armenia Mrs. Katherine Leach. The ceremony was also attended by the CEO of LSC Group of Colleges Tim Andradi, the Chairman of the LSC Advisory Board Lord John Tomlinson of Walsall, the MBA Course Director at LSC Group of Colleges Dr. Lester Massingham, Pro Vice Chancellor at Anglia Ruskin University Dr. Trevor Bolton, and Mr. Mark Field of the LSC Advisory Board.

The school offers an MBA programme for both Armenian and international students, at the same standard offered in the other LSC overseas campuses such as London and Malta.

== See also ==
- London School of Commerce
- Anglia Ruskin University
- List of universities in Armenia
