= McTimoney College of Chiropractic =

Coordinates: 51.6704°N 1.3061°W

Location
- Kimber Road; Abingdon, Oxfordshire, OX14 1BZ; England

Information
- Type: Higher education
- Established: 1972
- Specialist: Chiropractic
- Principal: Professor Christina Cunliffe
- Gender: Co-educational
- Website: www.mctimoney-college.ac.uk

McTimoney College of Chiropractic is a chiropractic college, is part of the College of Health and validated by Ulster University in Abingdon, Oxfordshire, England.

Alongside the University of South Wales and the Health Sciences University, Bournemouth, the college is one of only three United Kingdom institutions to offer degrees recognized by the General Chiropractic Council, and the only one to specialize in programmes for those wishing to study while working. They offer an Integrated Undergraduate Master's degree in Chiropractic and two postgraduate Masters programmes in Animal Manipulation, plus a postgraduate Masters in Paediatric Chiropractic. Graduates of the Chiropractic degrees are eligible to register with the General Chiropractic Council, the UK Statutory Regulator. The college was founded as the Oxfordshire School of Chiropractic by John McTimoney. Graduates of the college make up a quarter of the UK's chiropractors. McTimoney College of Chiropractic The college's degrees are validated by Ulster University. The purpose of the McTimoney College of Chiropractic is to educate and train students to be competent in the philosophy, science and art of chiropractic, in order to benefit patients.
