= Education in London =

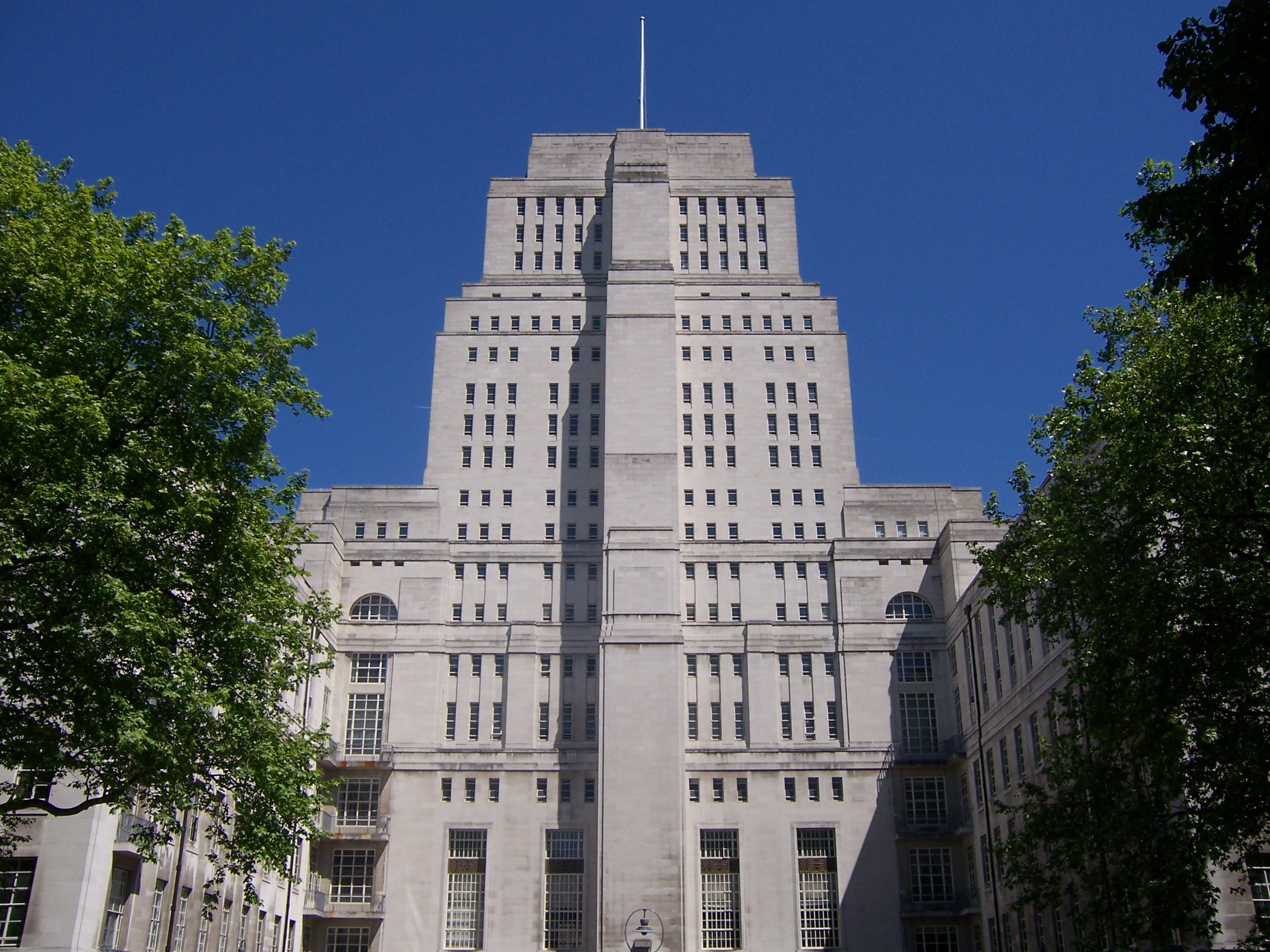
Senate House, in Bloomsbury, is the administrative centre of the University of London, a federation of London higher education institutions.

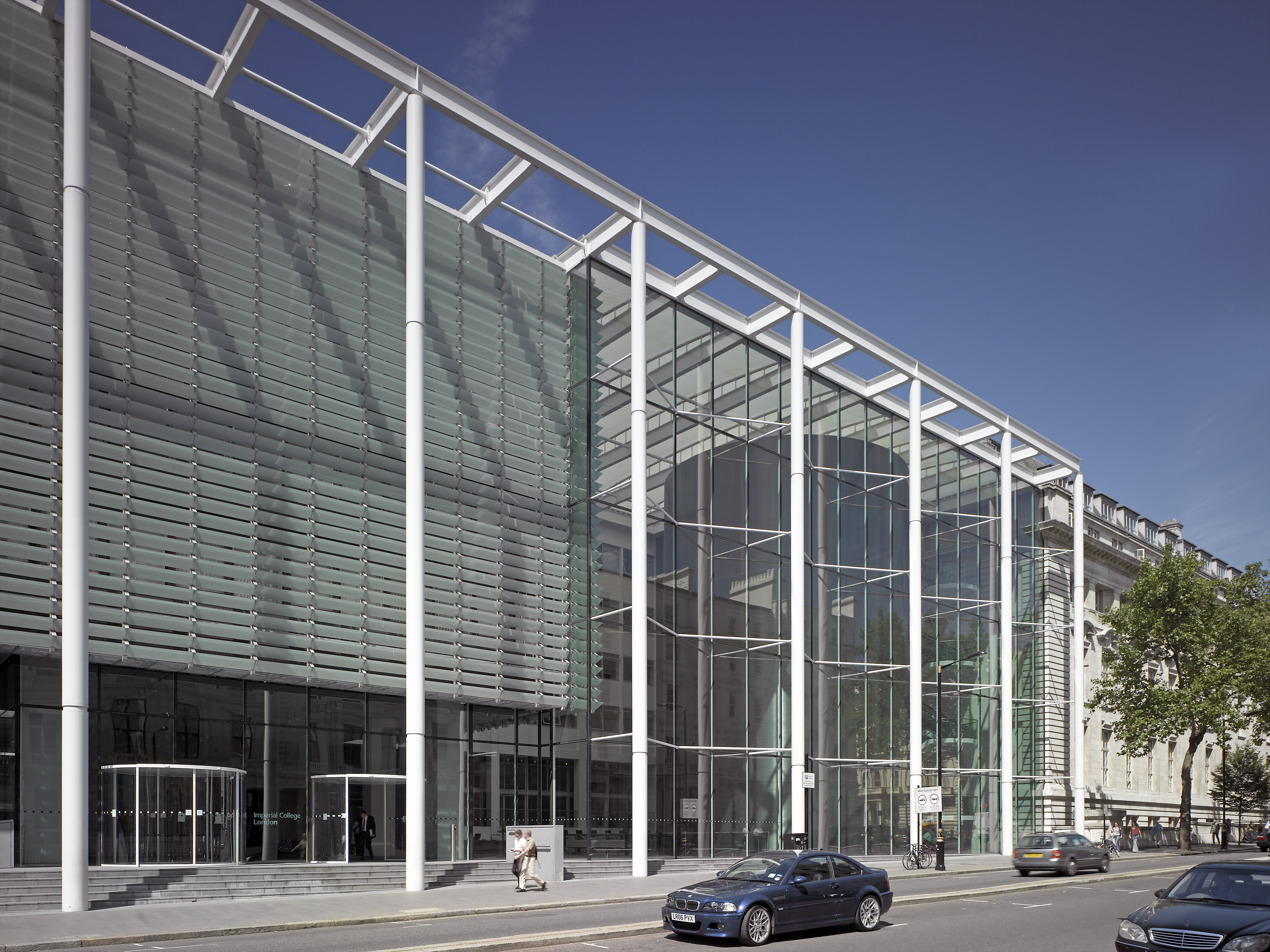
Imperial College London

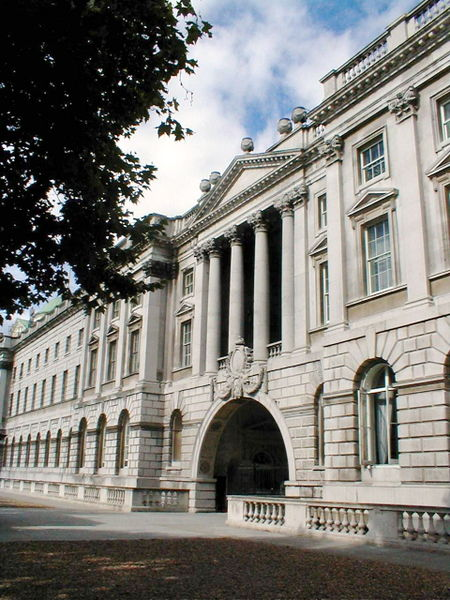
King's College London

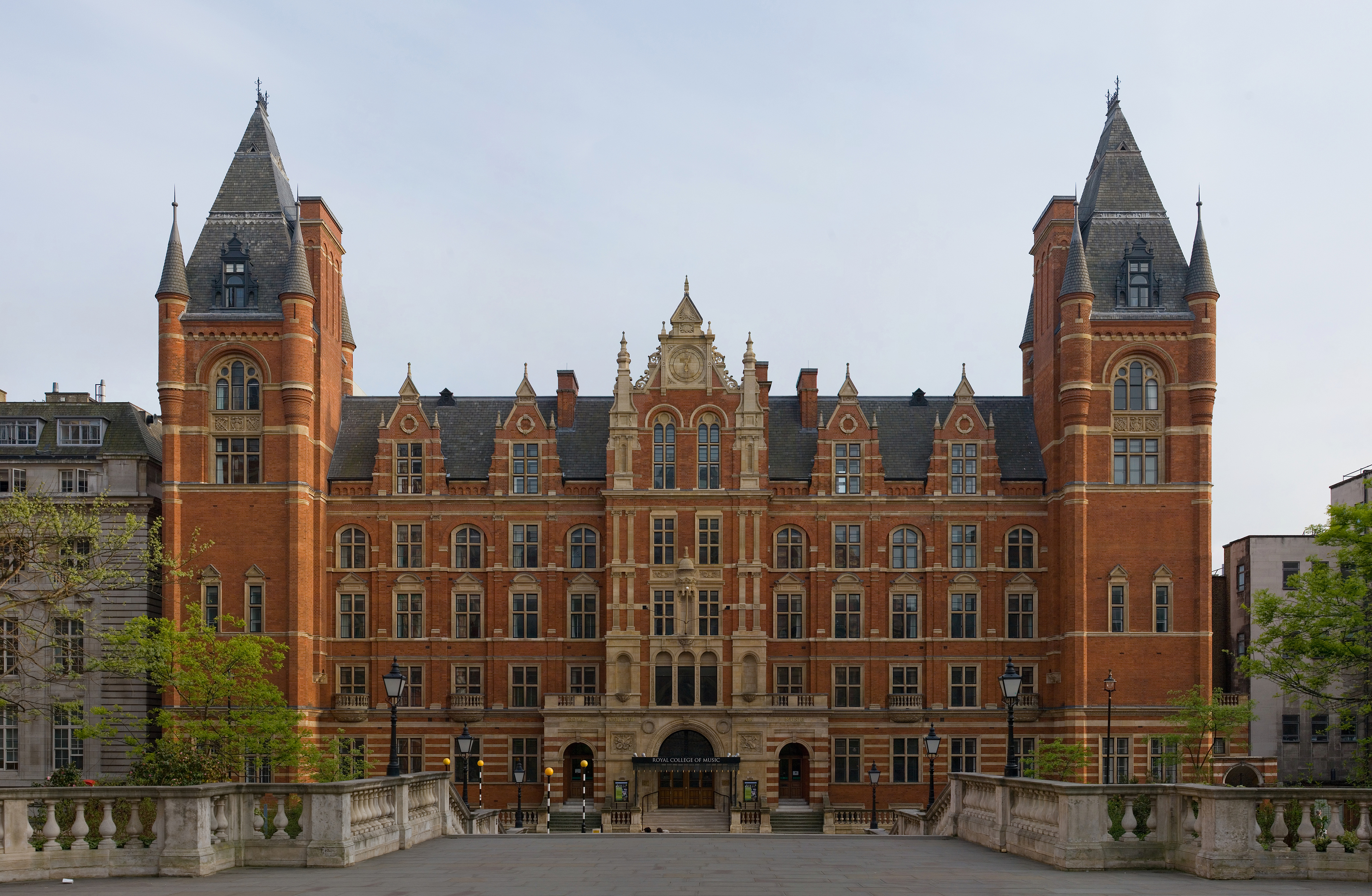
Royal College of Music

London Metropolitan University

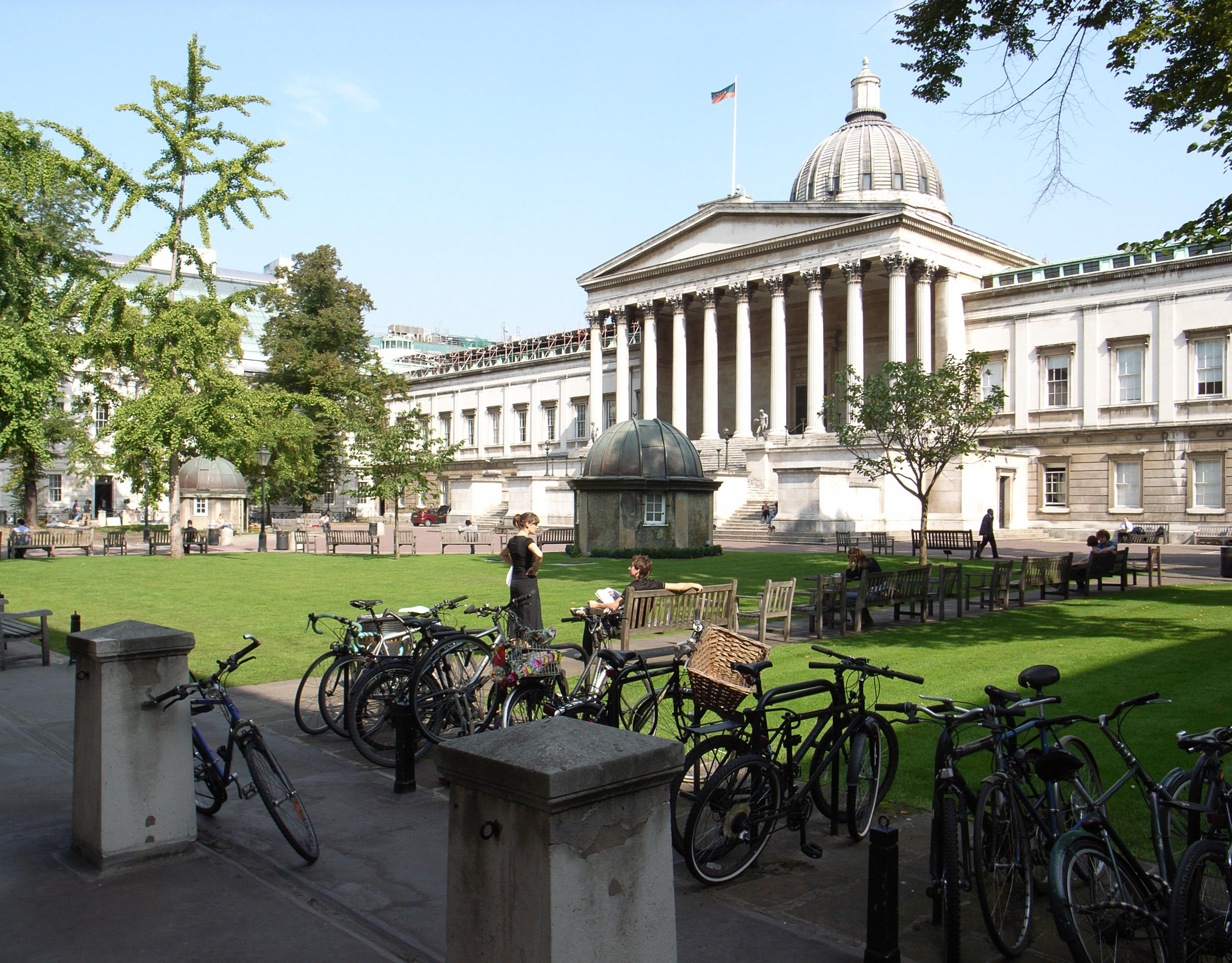
University College London

London is a leading global educational centre, having one of the largest populations of overseas students of any city in the world.

== Universities ==
London has the largest student population of any British city, although not the highest per capita.

The federal University of London, which, with over 120,000 students, is the largest contact teaching university in the United Kingdom (smaller only than the distance-education Open University) and one of the largest universities in Europe. It comprises 19 colleges and 12 institutes, as well as a distance-learning External System. Constituent colleges have a high degree of autonomy, controlling their own admissions and degree programmes, and are effectively universities in their own right. The largest and most well-known University of London colleges include (in order of student population size) University College London, King's College London, Birkbeck, Queen Mary, the London School of Economics and Political Science, Royal Holloway, Goldsmiths, City, and the Institute of Education. Smaller schools and institutes (with fewer than 5,000 students) include the School of Oriental and African Studies (SOAS), the London Business School, the School of Pharmacy, the London School of Hygiene and Tropical Medicine, St. George's Hospital Medical School and Central School of Speech and Drama. Traditionally all of the University of London institutions awarded degrees from the University of London itself, and not from the individual college or institution, but this changed in 2007/2008 when King's College London, the London School of Economics, University College London and the Institute of Education remained within the University of London system, but began awarding their own degrees. Imperial College London was a part of the University of London until 2007, but is now a separate institution.

There are also other universities not part of the University of London, most of which were polytechnics until UK polytechnics were granted university status by the Further and Higher Education Act 1992. Among these are the University of Westminster, London South Bank University, University of Greenwich, Middlesex University, London Metropolitan University, Brunel University, University of West London, the University of East London, and various other higher education institutions.

There are also a large number of specialised institutions, branches of UK universities based outside London, branches of foreign universities, and private universities and training colleges.

=== Research ===
Imperial College London, King's College London, LSE, Barts and UCL are leading centres of research and stand alongside MIT, Berkeley, Princeton, Johns Hopkins, Yale and other US universities in terms of international reputation.

Most of the leading British learned societies are based in London. The Royal Institution is a historic and important repository and proponent of the acquisition of scientific knowledge through research and study.

=== Other institutions of higher education ===
There are also a number of firms and colleges in London which provide education and consultation leading to degrees validated by universities, but which are not actual universities themselves. Some of these colleges are private institutions very similar to actual universities, such as European Business School, Aspley Business School London, London School of Business and Management and Regents University.

== Further education ==
London also has many further education (FE) and sixth form colleges funded by the Learning and Skills Council. Traditionally the further education colleges were clearly separated from the higher education system, and offered vocational education below university level, but this distinction is breaking down and many further education colleges now offer university level courses validated by a local university and prepare students for university entrance, as well as providing vocational courses.

Most London boroughs have an 11-18 comprehensive system for the provision of 16 to 19 year olds; these always or nearly always have comprehensive schools with a sixth form attached to it, alongside an FE college within the borough, with about half of young students in each. Croydon, Havering, Newham and Waltham Forest are sixth form college reorganised where there are usually two sixth form colleges along with a general FE college, with only few public schools maintaining sixth forms (in the case of Newham, no schools apart from Catholic ones). For a long time, two boroughs namely Harrow and Richmond upon Thames used a tertiary provision where all education for young learners was based at tertiary colleges (except Catholic faith-based institutions in Harrow) and no public schools with sixth forms existed. Both boroughs have recently moved away from this system - Harrow introduced school sixth forms for the first time in 2008, while Richmond upon Thames did so in 2012. A few outer boroughs are selective, containing comprehensive schools with sixth forms, FE or sixth form colleges, and multiple grammar schools.

== Arts education ==
London is Britain's leading centre for arts education. London's four music conservatories are the Royal College of Music, the Royal Academy of Music, Trinity College of Music, and the Guildhall School of Music and Drama. Other drama schools include Royal Academy of Dramatic Arts ("RADA"), and the Central School of Speech and Drama. Art & Design schools include Central Saint Martins College of Art and Design, Chelsea College of Art and Design, Camberwell College of Arts, Wimbledon School of Art and London College of Communication and London College of Fashion (all part of the University of the Arts London), and Goldsmiths College, University of London and the Slade School of Art (both part of the University of London), and The Design School (part of Kingston University ) and the Royal College of Art. The former Hornsey College of Art is now part of Middlesex University. The University of East London has an Institute for Performing Arts Development – IPAD.

== Medical education ==
London is an important centre of medical education. The city's medical schools are attached to the leading hospitals and some of them are several centuries old. The number of schools has been reduced to five by a recent series of mergers:

- Barts and The London School of Medicine and Dentistry
- King's College London School of Medicine and Dentistry (formerly Guy's, King's and St Thomas' School of Medicine)
- Imperial College School of Medicine
- University College London Medical School
- St George's Hospital Medical School

=== Multiculturalism ===
London is known as a city that is diverse, populated by peoples and cultures from many other parts of the globe. Many London schools require the teaching of foreign language.

== Schools ==
Demand for primary school and secondary school places has decreased in parts of London in recent years due to 20 per cent decrease in the city's birth rate between 2012 and 2022. In 2024, the boroughs of Lambeth, the City of London, Lewisham, Westminster and Camden were projected to see the largest decline in student numbers between 2021-22 and 2026-27. This change in demand is not evenly spread, with the same data projecting an increase in student numbers in the boroughs of Havering, Kingston upon Thames, Barking and Dagenham, Waltham Forest and Bexley in the same period.

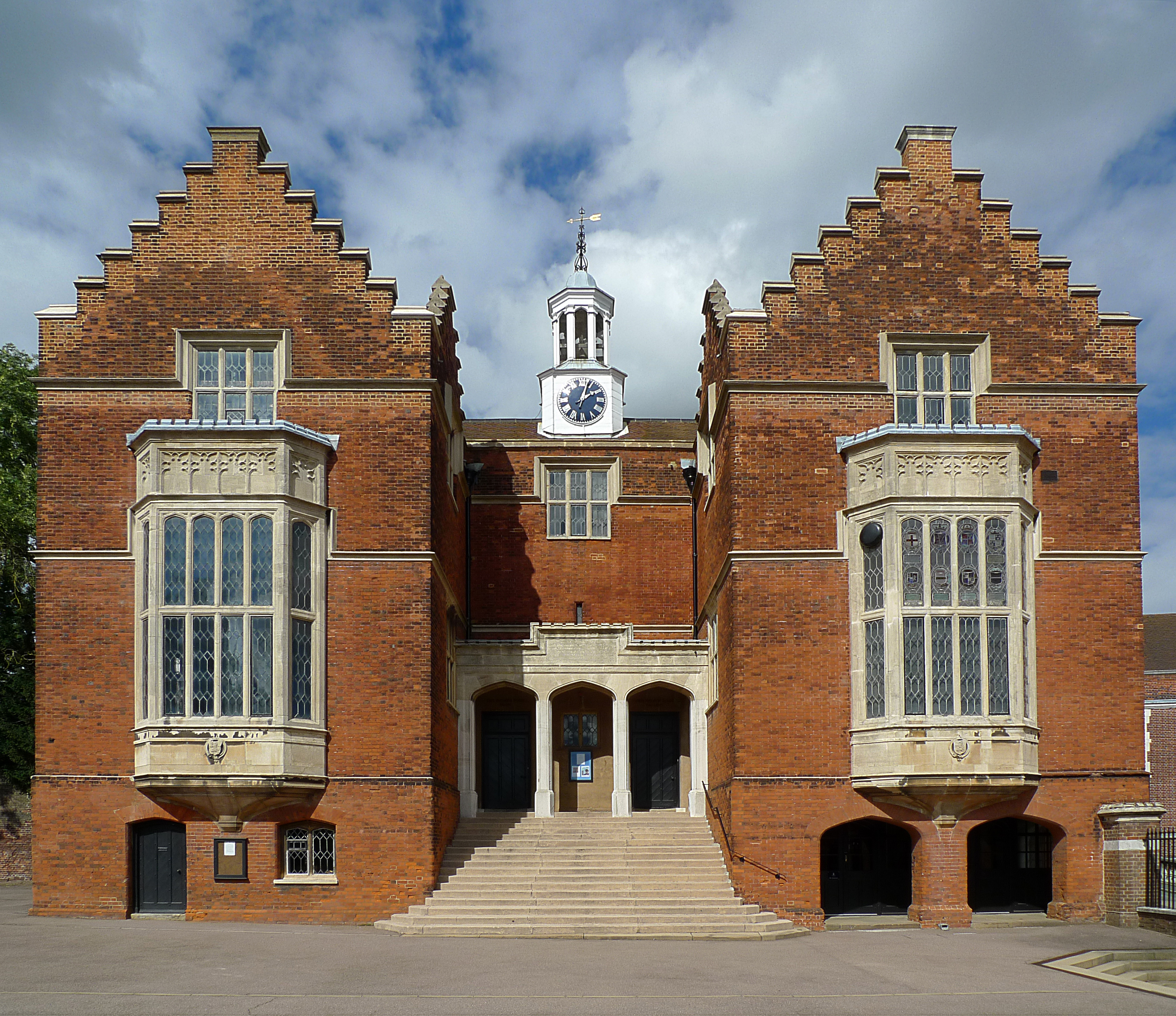
The Old Schools, Harrow School

Public schools in Greater London include Harrow, City of London School, University College School, Westminster, Highgate School, King's College School, Wimbledon, Merchant Taylors' School and St Paul's School.

International schools include The American School in London, German School London, the Japanese School in London, and the Lycée Français Charles de Gaulle (French school). The London Japanese school, in addition to its day school, also has a weekend programme serving students in the Japanese community in the United Kingdom who attend British and international schools.

== Student housing ==
The low quality of the halls of residence offered by universities, the shortage of student housing, and the relatively good economic resources of the international students who attend schools in London offered an economic opportunity to firms such as Unite Students which have built thousands of units of student housing in London.
