= Bridgend College =

- Coleg Penybont
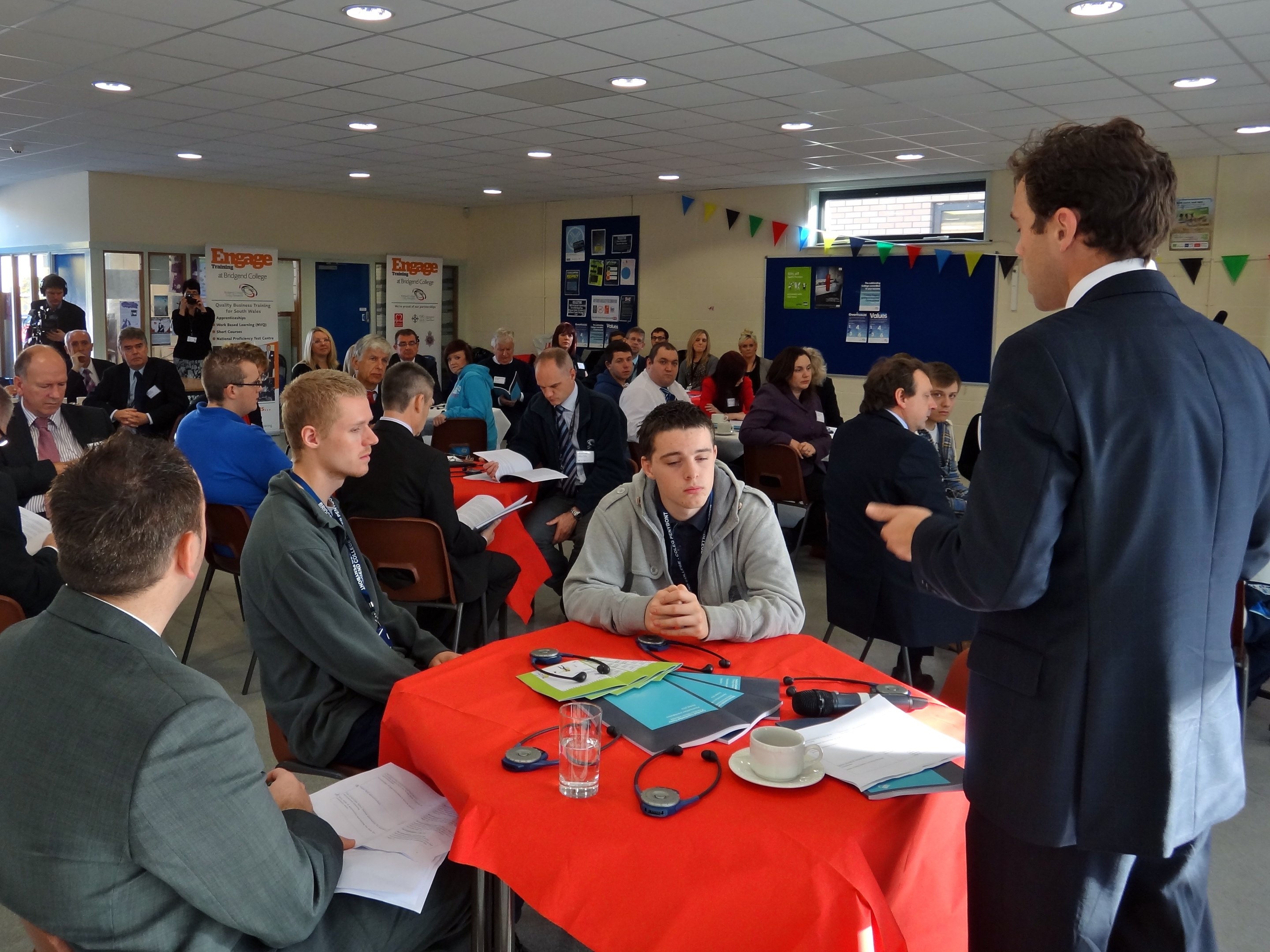
- Minister for Economy Ken Skates MS speaking at the College in 2012

Location
- Bridgend College (Main Campus); Cowbridge Road; Bridgend, Bridgend, CF31 3DF; Wales

Information
- Type: Further education college
- Established: September 1928; 97 years ago
- Local authority: Bridgend
- Chair: Emma Adamson
- Principal and Chief Executive: Viv Buckley
- Staff: 600
- Gender: coeducational
- Age: 16+
- Enrolment: 13,000
- Website: https://www.bridgend.ac.uk/

Bridgend College (Welsh: Coleg Penybont) is a further education college based in Bridgend, Wales. Founded in 1928 as the Bridgend Mining and Technical Institute, the college today has four campuses in Bridgend, Pencoed, Queens Road and Maesteg.

The college currently delivers provision for over 6,000 students and employing over 700 members of staff across its four campuses. It was named the Times Educational Supplement FE College of the Year in 2019.

== Campuses ==
- Bridgend Campus (51.4997°N 3.5721°W)
- Pencoed Campus (51.5259°N 3.4899°W)
- Queens Road Campus 51.4984°N 3.5532°W
- Maesteg Campus 51.6101°N 3.6583°W

== Operations ==
In 2017, Bridgend College entered into a partnership with Pencoed Comprehensive School to create Penybont Sixth Form College. Through the partnership, 29.3% of students received an A*- A grade while 83.8% secured A*-C results. The grade received for A* – E was 99.4%.

In January 2019 Bridgend College unveiled plans designed by Rio Architects for a new STEAM Academy to be built on the Pencoed Campus, due to open September 2021. The academy will be a new building to accommodate teaching, learning and support facilities for Science, Technology, Engineering, Arts and Mathematics.

In July 2019 the college cut 34 jobs and closed its loss-making Cardiff Arts Academy due to "financial challenges".

In July 2020 it was announced that Bridgend secondary schools would retain their sixth forms, rather than opening one sixth form centre for the county. Instead, a centre of excellence is being considered at the Pencoed Campus of Bridgend College.

== Courses ==
Bridgend College offers Diplomas, sub Diplomas, extended Diplomas, Certificates, A levels, Awards, Professional qualifications and NVQs. The college also offers higher education courses, including HNCs, HNDs, Foundation Degrees and Degrees awarded through the University of South Wales, Cardiff Metropolitan University, CMI and Pearson.

== Performance ==
The college has recently been verified as the Best Performing FE College for all qualifications in the whole of Wales. The information comes from a study conducted by the Welsh Government which puts Bridgend College at the top of the league table for all qualifications, with a success rate of 90.4%.

In April 2018, Bridgend College was voted the Best FE College in the WhatUni Student Choice Awards, as well as being proud winners of the RSM Award for Leadership and Governance from the Association of Colleges’ Beacon Award in 2017.

In September 2018, Bridgend College launched a partnered internship programme at the Princess of Wales Hospital in Bridgend, alongside national organisations DFN Project SEARCH, Engage to Change and Elite Supported Employment Agency. Project SEARCH Supported Internship aims to deliver a full-time programme that supports a cohort of learners with additional learning needs (ALN) to get a taste of full-time employment. The programme is based within the premises of a host employer with interns undertaking three work placements across the year.

In 2018, Bridgend College's Queens Road Campus was named Apprenticeship Training Provider of the year for Scotland, Wales and Northern Ireland.

== Leadership ==
The college is led by its Principal and Chief Executive, Simon Pirotte, and Deputy Principal Viv Buckley. In 2018 Priotte was named Director of the Year - Public/Third Sector at the Institute of Directors' National Director of the Year Awards. Buckley was named Leading Wales' Leadership in the Public Sector award winner in 2018.

== Honorary Fellows ==
Each year Bridgend College holds its Higher Education awards at Pencoed Campus and honours individuals who have made contributions to education, the community and to the college by awarding an Honorary Fellowship. Honorary Fellows include:

| Year | Name |
|---|---|
| 2019 | David Evan Roberts CBE |
| 2019 | Claire Birkenshaw |
| 2018 | Neil Robinson OBE |
| 2018 | Madeleine Moon MP |
| 2017 | Charles Middleton |
| 2017 | Richard Parks |
| 2016 | Barbara Wilding CBE |
| 2016 | Janice Gregory |
| 2015 | Menna Richards OBE |
| 2014 | Helen Jenkins |
| 2014 | Nathan Stephens |
| 2013 | Laura McAllister |
| 2013 | Bill Goldsworthy |
| 2012 | Steve Dalton OBE |
| 2012 | Terry Coles |
| 2012 | Aled Davies |
| 2011 | Roger Burnell |
| 2011 | Dr John Graystone |
| 2010 | John Bevan |
| 2010 | Stan Peate |
| 2009 | Carwyn Jones AM |
| 2008 | Gareth Bray |
| 2007 | Godfrey Hurley |

== See also ==
- List of UCAS institutions
- List of universities in the United Kingdom
