= British College of Osteopathic Medicine =

Coordinates: 51.5471°N 0.1793°W

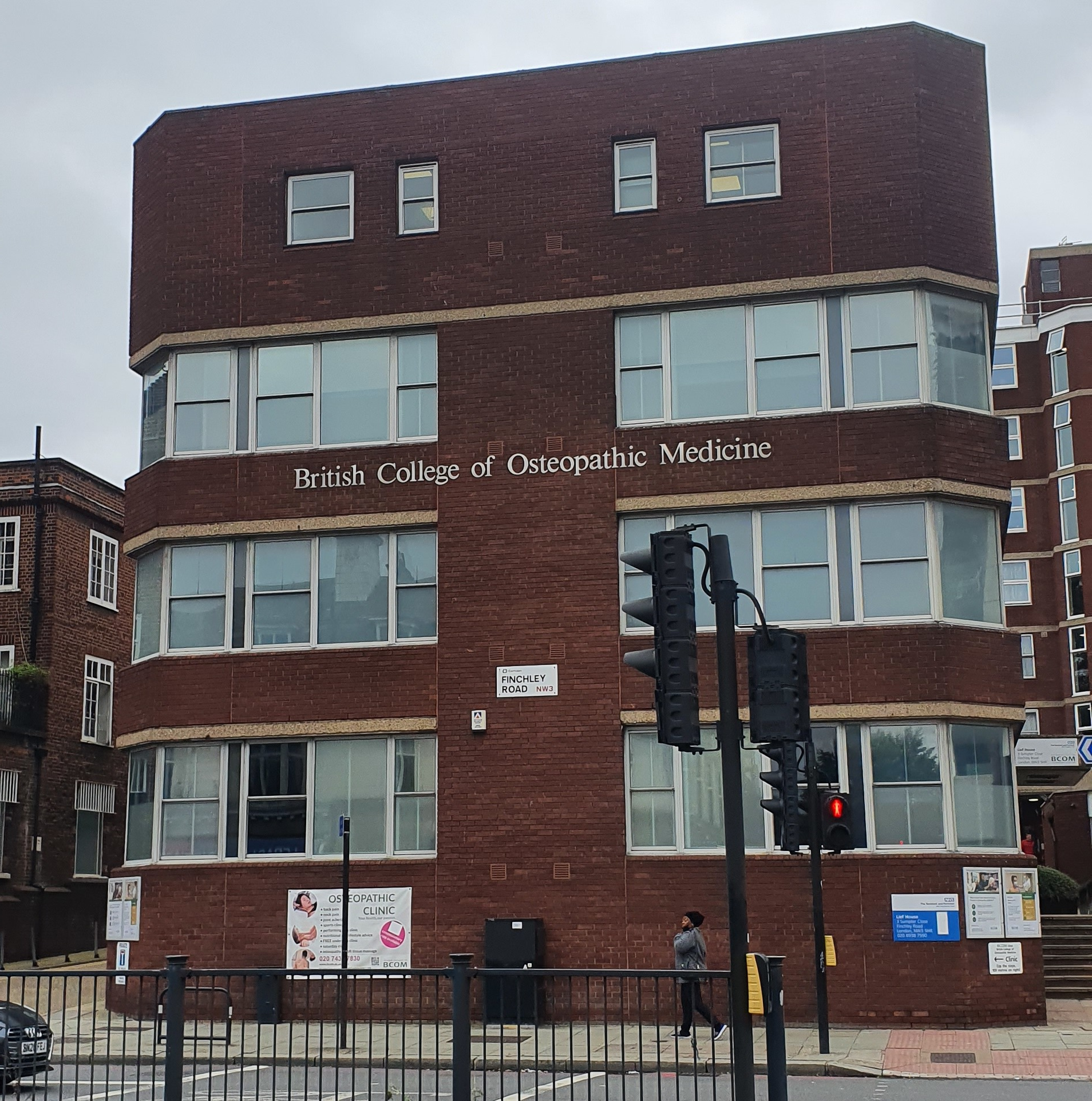
Headquarters in Finchley Road

The British College of Osteopathic Medicine (also known as BCOM) is an educational organisation based in London and is part of the BCNO Group. It was one of the first colleges to offer degree-level and master's-level study in osteopathy. BCOM offers a four year full-time Master of Osteopathy and four year modified attendance BSc (Hons) Osteopathy.

== History ==
The College was founded as the British College of Naturopathy and Osteopathy (BCNO) in 1936. Its original site was bombed in 1942 during World War II and the naturopathic pioneer, Stanley Lief, founder of Champneys Spa, donated a house in London’s Hampstead as a new campus. This building, which is now named Frazer House and is Grade II-listed, is still the core of the BCOM campus. The college was renamed to the British College of Osteopathic Medicine (BCOM) in 2002. In 2021 BCOM merged with the European School of Osteopathy (ESO). BCOM and ESO are part of the BCNO Group. Its patron is Her Royal Highness Princess Eugenie

== Courses ==
BCOM currently provides the following degree pathways:

=== Master of Osteopathy ===
This pathway also includes a Diploma in Osteopathy, which offers eligibility to register with the General Osteopathic Council. A four-year integrated masters, allowing direct entry for undergraduates which takes them to a Masters in Osteopathy and eligibility to professionally register in the UK. This course attracts public funding for eligible students for all four years.

=== BSc(Hons) Osteopathy (modified attendance) ===
The four year BSc(Hons) Osteopathy is an undergraduate ‘modified attendance’ degree programme, blending face-to-face/live-streamed theory lectures with in-person practical classes and clinical experience.

The course is designed for those looking to become a registered osteopath who need to study flexibly around work/life commitments. It runs over two evenings a week (6-9pm) and one weekend day a month (9am-5.30pm). Additional hours needed for the completion of essential clinical hours and for optional tutorials. This is an intense full-time degree programme, which requires commitment from the student to undertake additional self-directed study.

Successful students will graduate from BCOM or ESO with a BSc(Hons) Osteopathy, validated by the University of Plymouth. The university’s rigorous validation process is in place to ensure all educational standards are metThis degree is a conversion-to-degree course for already-registered Osteopaths.

== Clinics ==
BCOM operates an outpatient teaching clinic from its Frazer House site in Netherhall Gardens, Hampstead. The Clinic is served by both clinical students under either direct (pre-registration) or on-call (post-registration) supervision from experienced and registered osteopaths with a wide range of experience. Clinical experiential learning is a fundamental of osteopathic education.

Frazer Clinic has 24 treatment rooms, a full clinic reception and a dedicated IT and seminar suite. Well established in the local community around BCOM’s Frazer House campus in Hampstead, Frazer Clinic is used for most of the clinical training undertaken by undergraduate students. Lief Clinic, also on campus, at the Lief House site, was inaugurated in 2004 as a research clinic. The Lief Clinic is normally staffed by postgraduate students and BCOM faculty members engaged in research.

Before registering, UK osteopathy students take a Clinical Competence assessment. BCOM students have regularly achieved a 100% pass rate at first attempt, which is held to be best practice in the UK Osteopathic sector.

== See also ==
- List of UCAS institutions
- List of universities in the United Kingdom
- List of universities and higher education colleges in London
- List of osteopathic colleges
