= MLA College =

Higher education institution

- Type: Private
- Established: 2014 (as Marine Learning Alliance Ltd)
- Parent institution: Global Education Holdings
- Affiliations: University of Plymouth
- Principal: Professor Mohammad Dastbaz
- Location: Plymouth, Devon, United Kingdom; 50.3716°N 4.1423°W
- Campus: Distance learning
- Website: www.mla.ac.uk

MLA College (formerly Marine Learning Alliance Ltd) is a private higher education institution based in Plymouth, United Kingdom. It offers distance learning higher education programmes, with a focus on maritime and environmental disciplines. The college's degree programmes are validated and awarded by the University of Plymouth.

== History ==
MLA College originated as the Hydrographic Academy, a distance-learning programme at the University of Plymouth providing education in hydrography and marine science. In November 2014, the Institute of Marine Engineering, Science and Technology (IMarEST) acquired the Hydrographic Academy, and Marine Learning Alliance Ltd was incorporated as a separate company.

In 2014, the college received the Times Higher Education Award for Outstanding Employer Engagement. In 2019, MLA College was officially registered with the Office for Students (OfS) as a higher education provider in England. In August 2023, the college was acquired by Global Education Holdings, a UK-based higher education investment company.

== Academics ==
MLA College delivers undergraduate and postgraduate degree programmes through distance learning. Its academic provision includes programmes in maritime operations, sustainability, and business-related fields. The college also participates in professional training initiatives, including bursary schemes for women in the maritime sector. The college collaborates with the United Nations Institute for Training and Research (UNITAR) to deliver educational programmes related to the Sustainable Development Goals (SDGs). This includes a series of short courses developed in partnership with UNITAR training networks.
