= Central Film School =

- Type: Specialist Higher Education Provider
- Established: 2008
- Location: London, United Kingdom
- Campus: Avondale Hall, 72 Landor Road, London, SW9 9PH
- Website: http://www.centralfilmschool.com

Central Film School (CFS) is a training provider located in South West London. It was founded in 2008 and is on the Office for Students register of approved Higher Education Providers.

== History ==
Founded in 2008, Central Film School has provided students from all over the world with the tools needed to become professionals in the screen industries. The school offers degrees, short courses and postgraduate qualifications in filmmaking, screenwriting and acting for screen. As a micro provider of Higher Education, the school hosts around 200 students each year. Its degrees are validated by Falmouth University.

In 2015, CFS entered into partnership with Bertha Foundation, a philanthropic organisation that funds documentary features. The school offers documentary modules and factual specialisms to reflect this partnership.

== Facilities ==
The school moved to their new home in Clapham in 2022. The premises facilities include two studios, a screening theatre, edit suite, a fully equipped post-production suite, a library, kit and prop rooms, in addition to teaching and social spaces.

== Industry Talks ==
In the past years, CFS hosted student Q&As with filmmakers such as Nick Hornby, George Amponsah (director of The Hard Stop), and Sir Ronald Harwood.

== Alumni ==
Alumni include BAFTA Cymru award-winning director Kim Strobl, Bollywood director Zaid Ali Khan, Tamil actor Naga, and Nigerian actor Demola Adedoyin.
