= Health Sciences University (United Kingdom) =

Specialist university in Bournemouth, England

- Logo of Health Sciences University (HSU)
- Established: 1965 (Bournemouth); 1917 (London)
- Chancellor: The Princess Royal
- Vice-Chancellor: Lesley Haig
- Students: 1,185 (2022/23)
- Undergraduates: 870 (2022/23)
- Postgraduates: 315 (2022/23)
- Location: Bournemouth, Dorset, England; 50°43′38″N 1°49′44″W
- Campus: Suburban
- Website: www.hsu.ac.uk

Health Sciences University, formerly AECC University College, is a specialist university in Bournemouth (with a dedicated school of osteopathy in London) that offers undergraduate, postgraduate, and short courses in a range of health sciences disciplines.

These include chiropractic, diagnostic and therapeutic radiography, physiotherapy, sports rehabilitation, sport and exercise psychology, clinical exercise and rehabilitation, and sport and exercise science.

As a specialist provider, this range of courses sits alongside teaching and clinical facilities based onsite, including a large clinic, MRI, ultrasound, X-ray, and rehabilitation gym.

The university operates a large community-based chiropractic clinic that provides subsidised treatments, supports student placements, and is a base for research and development activities. A new integrated rehabilitation centre was opened in October 2022.

== History ==
AECC University College was founded in September 1965 as the Anglo-European College of Chiropractic. It was established with financial backing of European Chiropractors, supported by the European Chiropractor’s Union (ECU), and recognised by the British Chiropractic Association (BCA). This was the first chiropractic training program in Europe and passed its first chiropractors in 1969. Also, it was renamed in 1969 to the Anglo-European of Chiropractic (AECC).

The official opening of the AECC at its present location in Boscombe took place on 21 May 1982. AECC University College went on to offer the first validated degree course in Chiropractic in 1988. It offered the first undergraduate and postgraduate Masters courses in 1997, validated by the University of Portsmouth and accredited by the General Chiropractic Council (GCC) in 2000. AECC University College later supported the University of Portsmouth to develop a Professional Doctorate in Chiropractic. Bournemouth University became the validating partner in 2005, and in 2007-8 new educational provision was validated in related diagnostic and rehabilitation fields of Medical Ultrasound (MSc) and Clinical Exercise Science (BSc delivered in partnership with BU).

Alongside the University of South Wales and the McTimoney College of Chiropractic, the former Anglo-European College of Chiropractic was one of only three institutions in the United Kingdom to offer Chiropractic degrees recognised by the General Chiropractic Council as of 2013. AECC University College was granted Taught Degree Awarding Powers in 2017, and registered with the Office for Students (OfS) as a higher education provider in 2018.

AECC University College changed its name to Health Sciences University in July 2024. In August 2024, the University College of Osteopathy was merged into Health Sciences University (formerly AECC University College). UCO became UCO School of Osteopathy and continued to offer osteopathy courses in London.

== Schools ==
Its schools include:

- AECC School of Chiropractic
- School of Health and Rehabilitation Services
- The Centre for Workforce and Systems Innovation
- UCO School of Osteopathy
- Health Business School

== Clinical services ==
In 2009 AECC University College opened a new clinic building to support its Clinical Services, consisting of 33 treatment rooms, a suite of tutor rooms, a student study space and a rehabilitation gym. The Clinic treats over 50,000 patient contacts a year.

The site has onsite imaging facilities that are high-tech for patient diagnosis, such as 10 ultrasound machines housed in another nearby building. The site also has an open upright MRI scanner, one of seven in the UK, and a digital X-ray department with mock ward facilities. A rehabilitation gym also exists to support patient care, giving a holistic setup for diagnosis, treatment, and rehabilitation.

At AECC University College, the Human Performance Laboratory facilitates education in physiological and biomechanical measurement, data analysis, and interpretation. The facility facilitates functional assessment and motion analysis, which is essential for health sciences courses such as Chiropractic and Physiotherapy. By concentrating on kinematic and kinetic analysis, students acquire hands-on learning in understanding human movement and function.

AECC University College was awarded £2.7m funding by the Dorset Local Enterprise Partnership (Dorset LEP) in September 2020 towards the building of a new Integrated Rehabilitation Centre facility and to develop a programme of new courses and patient services.

The £4.5m Integrated Rehabilitation Centre officially opened in October 2022; a treatment facility with 238m2 of multi-zoned rehabilitation space, and an additional nine treatment rooms. AECC University College is working in partnership with a local primary care network and local NHS providers to deliver care and support patients both on and offsite.

== Campus facilities ==
The University College campus is split into Parkwood Campus and Garnet Campus, located across the road from each other.

Parkwood Campus consists of the main University College building, Chiropractic Clinic, Cavendish House, and the student Gym. Across the road, Garnet Campus is home to the School of Rehabilitation, Sport and Psychology and the Integrated Rehabilitation Centre.

Cavendish House

Cavendish House is home to the School of Radiology. Equipment includes the VERT (Virtual Environment Radiotherapy Treatment) and Samsung and AGFA Clinical rooms.

Toggler's Arms & Spine & Dine Refectory

Student bar, dining and leisure facilities.

Gym

AECC University College gym has cardio facilities housing spinning bikes, rowing machines and a cross trainer. It also has a well-equipped weights area and climbing wall. The gym is housed within a sports hall which is used for various activities including: netball, hockey, basketball, badminton, handball and football. It also holds various exercise classes through the week.

Library

The library at AECC University College is situated in what was once the chapel to the convent. The building has original stained-glass windows and high ceilings, and houses over 10,000 books, 14,000+ online journals, medical databases, anatomical and other learning and academic software. The Library offers group study pods, desk space, seating areas and a self-service kiosk.

== Exercise and Sport Performance Centre ==
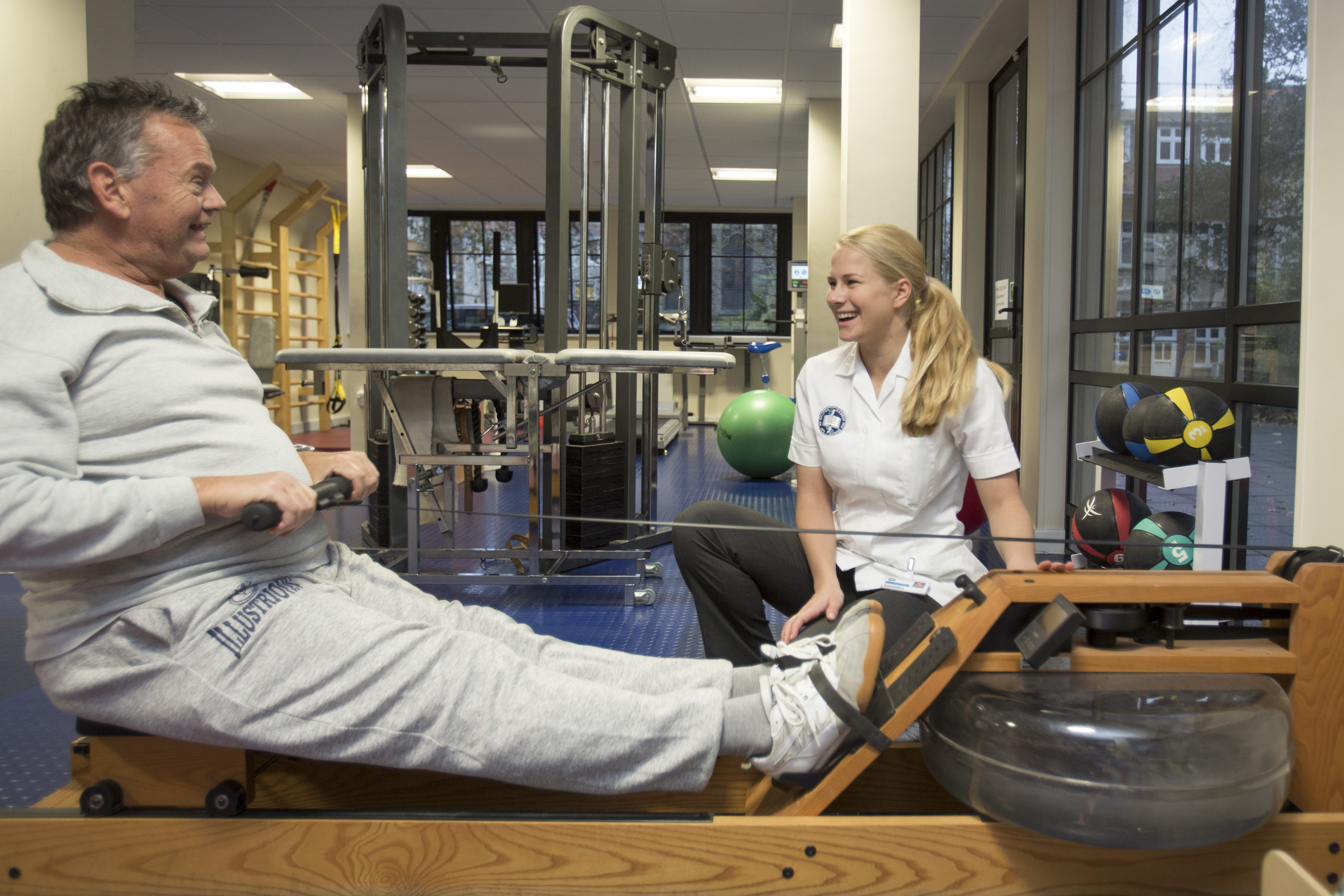
Patient in the AECC exercise centre

The Exercise Centre houses a range of strengthening and assessment tools. The room houses the following functional assessment equipment:

- Primus – isometric, isotonic and isokinetic assessment and training tool. It can target individual muscle groups or complete functional and sporting movements.
- MCU (multi-cervical unit) – used for neck isometric strength and range of motion testing, as well as for strengthening.
- Quintic – Biomechanical video analysis software. This has a high speed camera that can be slowed down and watched through a laptop and analysed using Quintic. This machine also has EMG (electromyography), which detects electrical activity in muscles so can be used to analyse muscle recruits and activation levels.

AECC University College hosted the Icelandic Olympic track and field team prior to their participation in the London 2012 Games.

The sport performance centre works with various sporting teams including Southampton FC, AFC Bournemouth, Bournemouth Rugby Football Club and The Seagulls.

== See also ==
- List of UCAS institutions
- List of universities in the United Kingdom
- List of universities and higher education colleges in London
