= University Campus of Football Business =

Specialist football higher education college

UCFB
- University Campus of Football Business
- Type: University College
- Established: 2011
- Founder: Brendan Flood
- Academic affiliations: University of East London
- CEO: Brendan Flood
- Location: London & Manchester
- Website: www.ucfb.ac.uk

University Campus of Football Business (UCFB) is a higher education institution offering undergraduate and postgraduate university degrees and executive education in the football and wider sports industries. As of 2026, UCFB is a college of the University of East London but is to become a college of BIMM University.

UCFB became the world's first dedicated higher education institution with university degrees in the football and sports industry when it was opened at Burnley F.C.'s Turf Moor in 2011.

== History ==
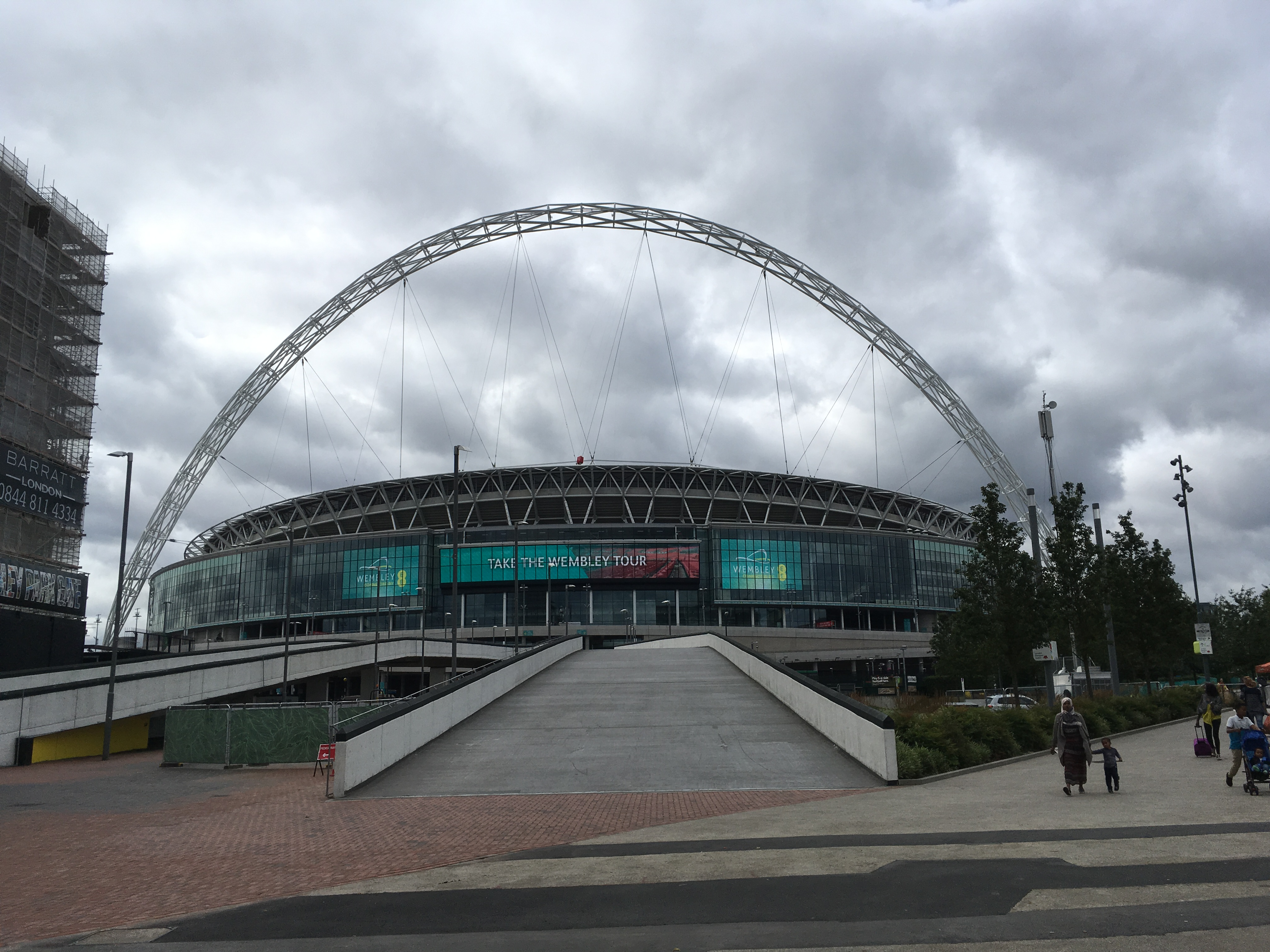
Wembley Stadium

UCFB's first campus opened in 2011 at Burnley Football Club. Elizabeth II and Prince Philip, Duke of Edinburgh visited the campus during their tour of Turf Moor as part of the Jubilee Celebrations.

In 2014, UCFB expanded and opened its second campus, UCFB Wembley, with Wembley Stadium at the heart of the campus.

UCFB opened a flagship campus based at the Etihad Stadium in 2016. The UCFB Etihad Campus, which replaced UCFB Burnley, facilities included access to sporting facilities such as the Manchester Regional Arena and National Basketball Performance Centre.

In the 2023-24 academic year, the Etihad Campus expanded across Greater Manchester, and was renamed 'UCFB Manchester Campus.' This involved moving business and media students to MediaCityUK, and basing students on coaching courses at Curzon Ashton FC's Tameside Stadium, as well as new facilities in Manchester, Salford, Trafford and Tameside.

In addition to the two UK campuses, UCFB hosts annual global summits at Chase Stadium, Miami, home of Inter Miami CF, as well as New York City, Toronto and Melbourne.

In 2026, the University Campus of Football Business announced it was to become a college of BIMM University under a validation agreement, while remaining an independent institution.

== Courses ==
UCFB offers undergraduate degree programmes specialising in the football and wider sports industries.

=== Undergraduate ===
At undergraduate level, many programmes include a foundation year option, and entry requirements range from 96 to 112 UCAS points. The portfolio covers three broad areas:

- Business and management programmes include degrees in football business, finance, marketing, sports law, and events management.
- Coaching and performance programmes include degrees in football coaching and management, talent development, sports coaching science, and sport psychology.
- Media and broadcast programmes include degrees in multimedia sports journalism, media and broadcasting.

=== Postgraduate ===
At postgraduate level, UCFB offers Master's degree courses including:

- MSc Football Business
- MSc Football Coaching & Analysis
- MSc Football Communications & Digital Marketing
- MSc International Sport Management
- MSc Performance Analysis in Football
- MSc Scouting & Recruitment in Football
- MSc Sports Directorship

The MSc International Sport Management was ranked in the global top 25 postgraduate sport management programmes by SportBusiness.

=== Executive education ===
UCFB have also delivered executive education offerings in collaboration with The Football Association, Johan Cruyff Institute, and United Nations Institute for Training and Research.

== Other ventures ==
UCFB's elite football academies based at UCFB's campuses in Manchester and Wembley are led by UEFA-qualified coaches and tailored for those who have recently been released by professional football clubs and those that possess an ability to play at a higher level.

In 2016, UCFB acquired a shareholding in scholarship agency FirstPoint USA.

In July 2020, UCFB launched the Global Institute of Sport (GIS), furthering UCFB's educational breadth and delivery.

In 2022, UCFB Wembley launched the Wembley Basketball Academy, in partnership with local team London Elite Basketball, which was designed for aspiring basketball professionals in the UK to study alongside training, and as an effort to help grow the sport in the UK.

In June 2024, GIS launched a campus in Brussels, based at Lotto Park, the home of Belgian Pro League side RSC Anderlecht, alongside Vrije Universiteit Brussel. Later that month, a partnership with The Player Dubai to launch The Player Education Programmes, offering training and education for footballers of all levels and aspiring sports industry experts in Dubai.

== Notable people ==
Previous guest speakers at UCFB have included Gareth Southgate, Harry Redknapp, Graham Potter, Eddie Howe, Dan Ashworth, Paul Barber (football executive), Gabby Logan, Chris Hughton, Mauricio Pochettino, Brendan Rodgers and Steve McClaren.

The UCFB Strategic Leadership and Management Programme is led by Neil Doncaster, CEO of the Scottish Professional Football League.

=== Notable alumni ===
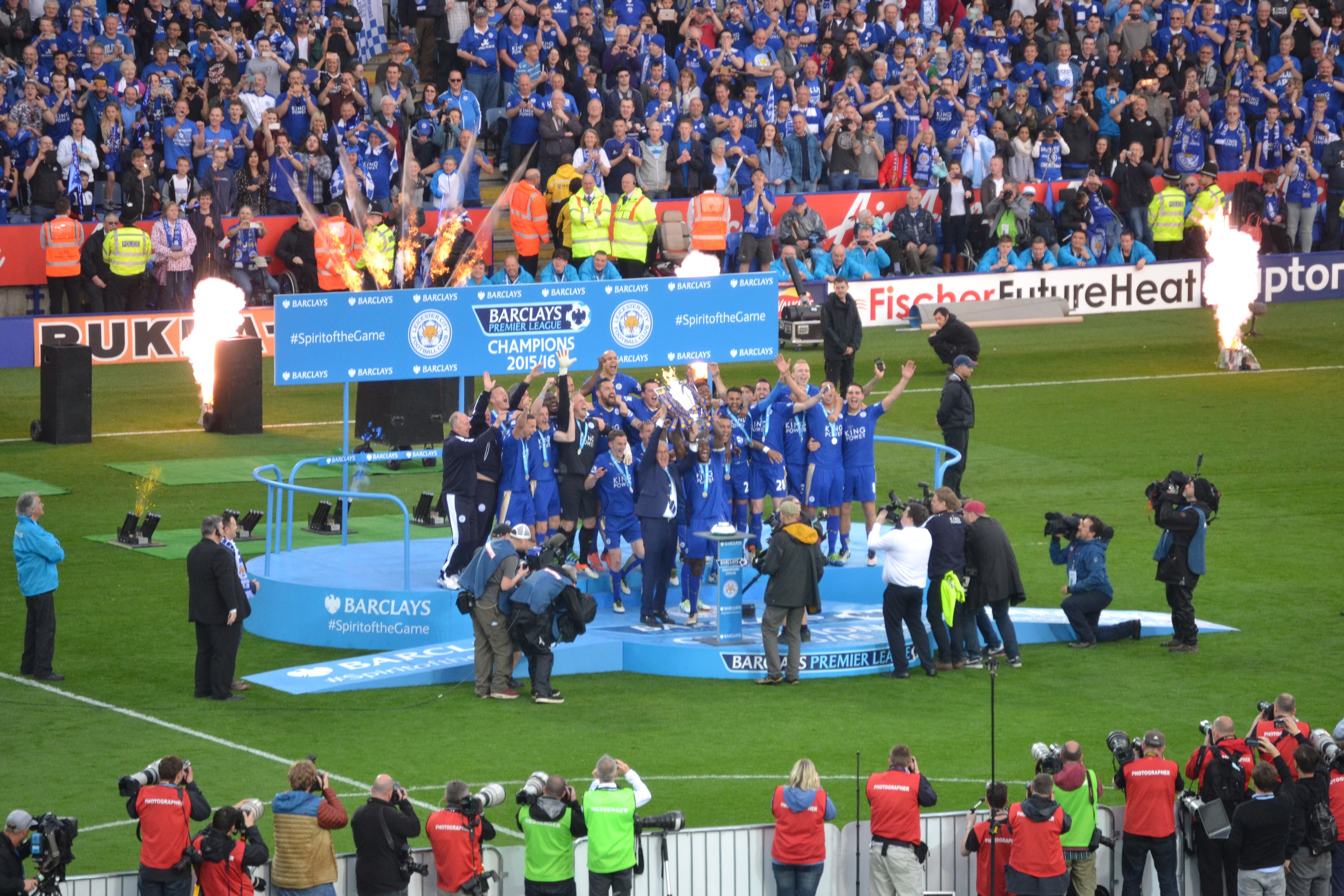
UCFB alumni Wes Morgan lifting the Premier League trophy as captain of Leicester City F.C.

- Joleon Lescott
- Wes Morgan
- Marisa Ewers
- Jason McAteer
- Lewis Grabban
- Jason Lowe
- Ashley Fletcher
- Reece James
- Stephen Constantine
- Gary Mackay-Steven
- Sam Baldock
- Bobby Copping
- Ben McNamara
