= University College of Osteopathy =

Osteopathy school in London, England

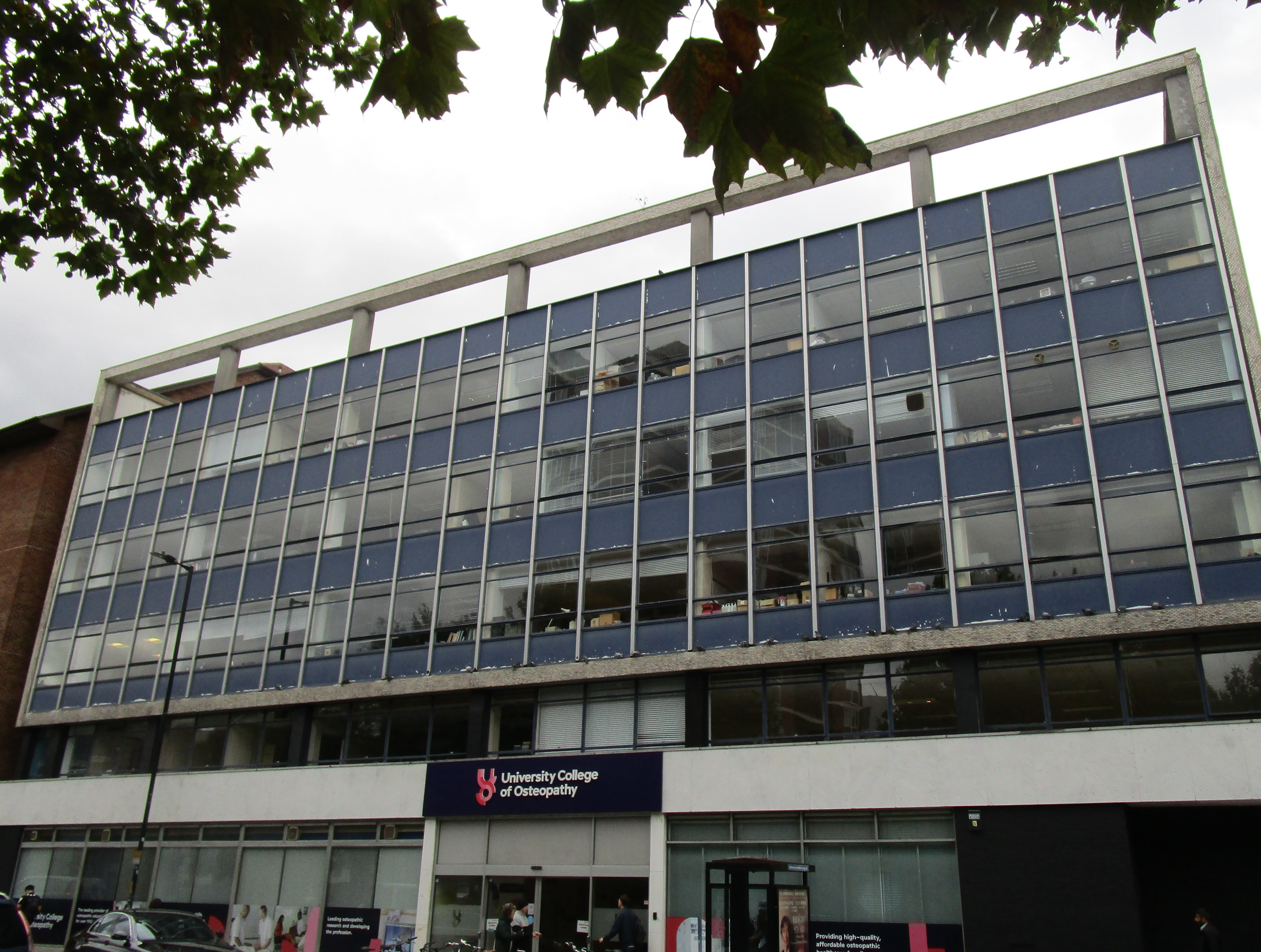
- UCO Main Building 2018
- Former name: British School of Osteopathy
- Established: 1917
- Parent institution: Health Sciences University
- Academic staff: 17 (in 2016)
- Administrative staff: 6 (in 2017)
- Postgraduates: 1,000
- Location: London, United Kingdom; 51.500105°N 0.094524°W
- Website: uco.ac.uk

The UCO School of Osteopathy, formerly the University College of Osteopathy (UCO) and the British School of Osteopathy (BSO), is a school of osteopathy in the United Kingdom. Incorporated in 1917, the school has recognised qualification status from the General Osteopathic Council, and was granted degree awarding powers in October 2015. It was given University College status in September 2017 and is an exempt charity. In August 2024, the University College of Osteopathy was merged into Health Sciences University and UCO became UCO School of Osteopathy.

== History ==
=== Founding and early development (1915-2019) ===
UCO was founded as the British School of Osteopathy (BSO) in 1915 by John Martin Littlejohn, an osteopath and former student of Andrew Taylor Still. However, it was not incorporated until 1917 due to the First World War. It had its first class of osteopathic students graduate in 1925. Between 1930 and 1980, the school relocated within London several times, before opening at Suffolk Street.

After Littlejohn's death in 1947, the school's direction was shaped by several people including Clem Middleton and Margot Gore. The school received charity status in 1963. In 1984, Princess Anne became the institution's Patron and served as the Chancellor in 2018. In 1993, BSc courses at the school were validated by the Open University Validation Services. It moved to its location on Borough High Street in London in 1997 and 1998.

=== New granted powers (2000-2017) ===
In 2000, it gained recognized qualification status from the General Osteopathic Council. In 2004, it was both the oldest and largest osteopathic school in the UK. It delivered a four-year degree course (B.Ost) including anatomy, physiology and pathology. Its outpatient clinic was the oldest osteopathic outpatient clinic in Europe, and had 37,000 appointments a year. That year, it partnered with the University of Bedfordshire and secured government funding. It opened a new clinic on Southwark Bridge Road in London in 2008.

The institution was granted degree awarding powers in October 2015. It was given University College status in September 2017 from the UK Privy Council, at which point it held Recognised Qualification (RQ) status from the General Osteopathic Council. In 2017, BSO was renamed the University College of Osteopathy.

=== Recent developments (2018-2025) ===
In August 2024, the University College of Osteopathy was merged into Health Sciences University (formerly AECC University College). Sharon Potter was Acting Vice-Chancellor of UCO right beforehand. UCO became UCO School of Osteopathy and continued to offer osteopathy courses in London. Patrick Gauthier is the current Head of the UCO School of Osteopathy.

== Programs and degrees ==
The UCO offers undergraduate and postgraduate programs to full or part-time students. These include an Access to Higher Education Diploma (Osteopathic Sciences & Health Care), a one-year further education course for students who wish to become osteopaths or study a related healthcare discipline at degree level. There is also an Introduction to Osteopathic Sciences course for potential M.Ost students who lack a solid scientific foundation.

Postgraduate programs include a professional doctorate in osteopathy, an MSc in osteopathy, and a postgraduate certificate in research methods. The UCO also provides ongoing continuous professional development courses.

== Clinics ==
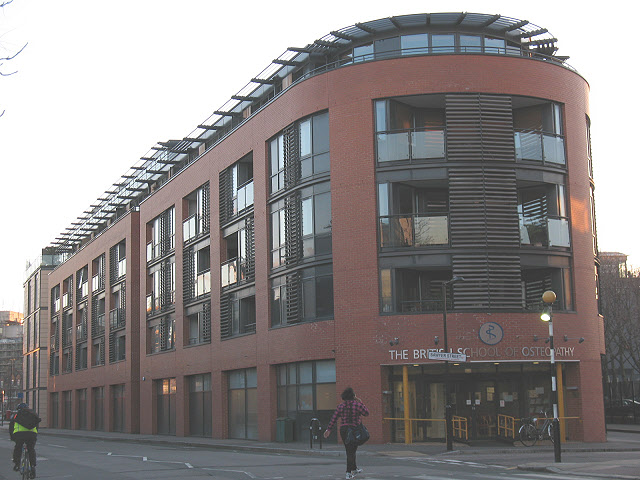
Clinic building, 2010

The UCO's clinical centre is at 98-118 Southwark Bridge Road, London. It houses the UCO's general clinic, as well as special clinics for expectant mothers, children, people with sports injuries and people with HIV/AIDS. As of 2004, its outpatient clinic was the oldest osteopathic outpatient clinic in Europe, and had 37,000 appointments a year. In the school's outpatient clinic, patients are treated by a third or fourth year student, with a qualified osteopath acting as a clinical tutor. UCO students also work with patients from the start of their studies. The UCO operates portfolio of community outreach osteopathy clinics, which along with the central outpatient clinic, provide students with patient contact.

== List of BSO Principals and UCO Vice-Chancellors ==
BSO Dean (1917 to 1947)

- 1917 to 1947 - John Martin Littlejohn

BSO Principal (1948 to 2002)

- 1948 to 1968 - Shilton Webster-Jones
- 1968 to 1977 - Colin Dove
- 1977 to 1982 - Stanley Bradford
- 1982 to 1990 - Sir Norman Lindop
- 1990 to 1998 - Clive Standen
- 1998 to 2002 - Martin Collins

BSO Principal and Chief Executive (2002 to 2017)

- 2002 to 2006 - Martin Collins
- 2006 to 2017 - Charles Hunt

UCO Vice-Chancellor (from 2017)

- 2017 to 2023 - Charles Hunt

UCO Acting Vice-Chancellor

- 2023-2024 - Sharon Potter

UCO Head of School

- 2024-Current - Patrick Gauthier

== See also ==
- List of osteopathic colleges
- List of UCAS institutions
- List of universities in the United Kingdom
