= London School of Commerce =

Independent higher education institution

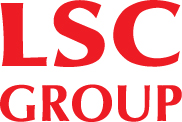
- Type: Private higher education institution
- Established: 1999
- Affiliation: Associate college of the University of Suffolk
- Dean: Geoffrey Lancaster
- Director: Timothy Andradi
- Address: Chaucer House, White Hart Yard, Southwark, London, United Kingdom
- Campus: Multiple international sites
- Website: www.lsclondon.co.uk

London School of Commerce, legally St Piran's School (GB) Ltd, is a private, independent higher education institution and associate college of the University of Suffolk located in London, England. It is not a member institution of, or related to, the University of London.

Its main campus is located in Southwark, with international campuses in Malta, Colombo, Kuala Lumpur and Dhaka under the LSC Group of Colleges.

It offers bachelors degrees in business and healthcare on behalf of other institutions. It also offers an MBA programme. It has been criticised as being a diploma mill, particularly in regards to its international campuses.

== History ==
The London School of Commerce (LSC) was founded in November 1999, with an initial group of 55 students. They studied postgraduate and undergraduate programmes in Business and Computing in collaboration with Charles Sturt University, Australia.

In 2007 the School of Business and Law (SBL) was formed, which conducts more specialised programs in Accounting and Business. Simultaneously the Group started expanding overseas, and opened two campuses; Westminster International College (WIC) in Kuala Lumpur and Asian Centre for Management and Information Technology (ACMIT) in Bangladesh.

Three new colleges were added in 2010–2011. A new division in Sri Lanka was validated on 1 December 2010, and officially opened on 1 February 2011 as the British School of Commerce. Another campus in Belgrade, Serbia was validated on 8 December 2010, and officially opened on 8 February 2011.

== Campuses and facilities ==
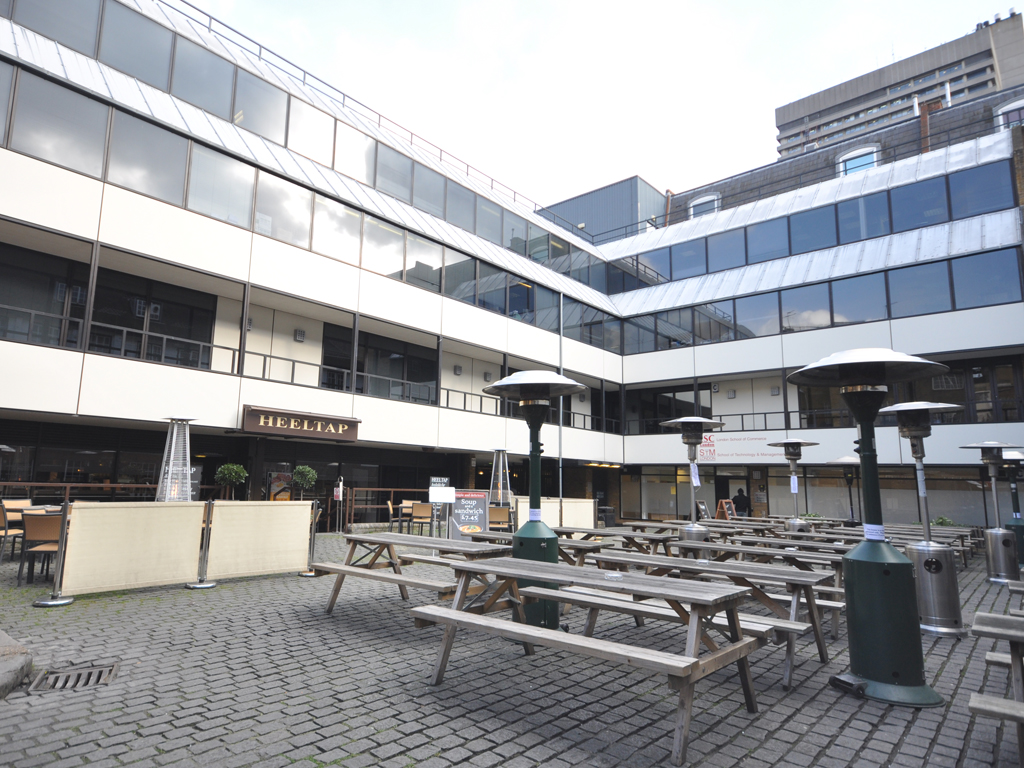
Chaucer House campus.

London School of Commerce group of colleges consists of local and overseas campuses.

=== London ===
The main LSC campus is located in the vicinity of London Bridge. A subsidiary campus was located for a while in Hannibal House, in the Elephant and Castle district of London, while another can be found at nearby Pocock House on Southwark Bridge Road. Additional classroom facilities are located close to London Bridge Station in Melior Street and Fenning Street. LSC London offers BA, MSc and MBA programmes in Business Management, Finance, Marketing and IT.

=== Malta ===
London School of Commerce Malta is located in Floriana, Malta. The school offers the opportunity for students to study English and offers BA and MBA top-up degrees on behalf of Canterbury Christ Church University.

=== Sri Lanka ===
The British School of Commerce in Colombo was established on 1 December 2010 and officially opened on 1 February 2011. BSC in Colombo is a regional centre for students from Sri Lanka, India, Bangladesh, Nepal and the Maldives.

=== Malaysia ===
Westminster International College is located in Subang Jaya, Selangor, the premier educational hub in Malaysia. The college is fully recognised as an institution of higher learning by Ministry of Higher Education Malaysia (MOHE) and the National Accreditation Board in Malaysia (MQA).

=== Bangladesh ===
An illegal LSC campus in Bangladesh started operating in 2007 and is located in the Banani district of Dhaka, close to the diplomatic enclave and business centres. The most recent campus building in the Gulshan Thana was opened in 2010 to accommodate Degree Foundation students. The University Grants Commission of Bangladesh (UGC) found that this unauthorized study centre, which did not receive permission from the government and also the UGC, is operating in Dhaka using the name “London School of Commerce.” It runs as a diploma mill, and the duration of all of its academic programs range from eight month to two years.

== Organisation and administration ==
The LSC is registered to the same address as a small private school in Hayle, Cornwall.

The LSC is not registered as with the Office for Students, meaning it cannot award its own degrees and its students cannot access loans from the Students Loan Company. It is on the UK Register of Learning Providers under the UKPRN 10008653.

It is an associate college of the University of Suffolk.

== Academics ==
=== Programmes ===
LSC offers several undergraduate and postgraduate programmes on behalf of other universities.

Programmes	On behalf of	Reference
BA top-up, MBA top-up	Wrexham University	
BA top-up, BA with foundation year, MBA top-up (Malta campus only)	Canterbury Christ Church University	
BA with foundation year	University of Suffolk	

It claims to have over 500 students studying PhD or DBA programmes.

It formerly offered a number of MSc programmes in information technology and international hospitality, as well as MBA and PhD programmes, on behalf of Cardiff Metropolitan University. The two no longer have any links. It also formerly offered foundation degrees for New College Durham, but the two are no longer partnered.

=== Research output ===
The LSC operates a Research and Innovation Centre, which hosts monthly seminars for doctoral students.

=== Rankings ===
LSC does not appear on any league tables or rankings.

== Student life ==
There is no student's union for the school. Student accommodation is also not provided, though the school provides recommendations for private accommodation.

The school has a cricket team which competes against other higher education institutions.

== See also ==
- List of schools in England
