= Bloomsbury Institute =

Business school in London, England

Coordinates: 51.5224°N 0.1316°W

- Former names: London School of Business and Management
- Type: Business school
- Established: 2002
- Affiliations: Birkbeck, University of London (validating partner)
- Principal: Joan O'Mahony
- Location: Bloomsbury, London, England
- Website: bil.ac.uk

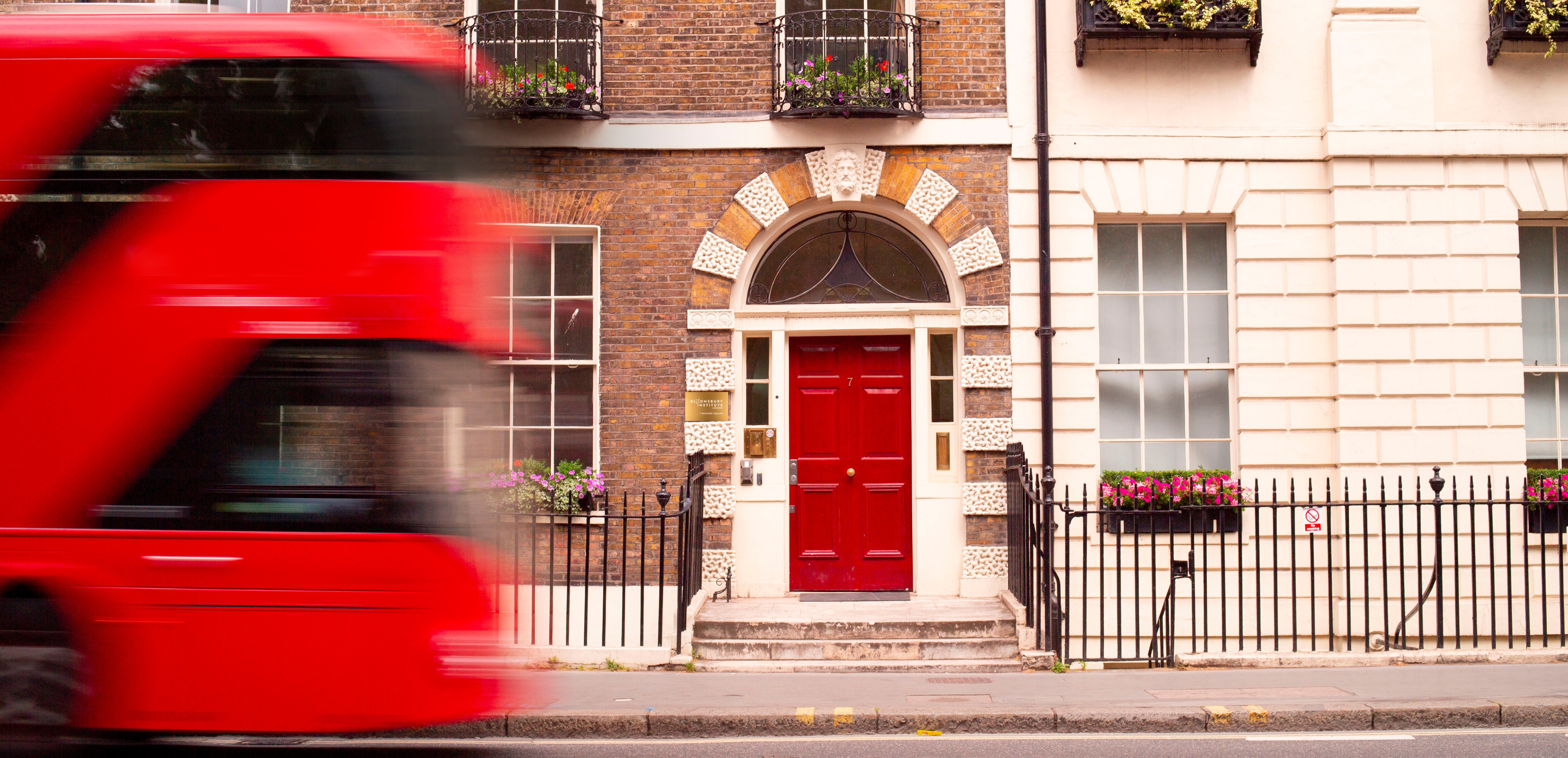
Bloomsbury Institute Building

Bloomsbury Institute is a higher education provider in central London offering undergraduate and postgraduate degree courses in business management, accounting, and law. The Institute was founded in 2002 as the London School of Business and Management and adopted its current name in 2018.

== History ==
Prior to 2016, Bloomsbury Institute concentrated on delivering HND programmes, awarded by Pearson Education, after which it shifted to primarily offering degrees validated by the University of Northampton. The last recruitment onto HND courses was in September 2015 and the first recruitment onto the new BA courses was in January 2016. From 2022 its degrees were validated by Wrexham Glyndŵr University (now Wrexham University). In 2025, Birkbeck, University of London agreed to validate the Institute's undergraduate and postgraduate programmes for students starting from October 2025.

== Regulation and quality ==
In 2019, the Office for Students refused the institute's application for registration, which meant that its students could not apply for student loans. The Office for Students gave the reasons as concerns about the drop-out rate and graduate employment rate. The director of the Office for Students was reported as saying that this decision was "completely unprecedented", adding that the reputational consequences were "quite severe". In 2020, Bloomsbury Institute won a landmark case against the Office for Students. In August 2020, the Court of Appeal overturned the Office for Students’ decision to not include Bloomsbury Institute on the register of providers, and ordered the Office for Students to reconsider Bloomsbury's application for registration. The Office for Students added the Institute to its register in October 2020, with conditions relating to student continuation.

Bloomsbury Institute is regularly reviewed by the Quality Assurance Agency. The last full review, in October 2015, noted that there had been a change of validator for degree programmes from the University of South Wales and Cardiff Metropolitan University to the University of Northampton. The review found that the institute met UK expectations for the maintenance of academic standards, for the quality of student learning opportunities and for the quality of information about learning opportunities, and commended the institute for its enhancement of student learning opportunities. A monitoring visit in 2016 found that all recommendations of the 2015 report had been implemented in full.

The Institute's UKVI student sponsor licence was suspended on 9 June 2026 and, as a result, it suspended recruitment of international students. The licence was revoked on 5 August 2026.

== Academic profile ==
In 2023, the National Student Survey ranked Bloomsbury Institute 2nd in the UK for overall student positivity (averaging all questions in the National Student Survey, excluding FE colleges and specialist providers). Compared to all other London universities (excluding specialist providers) Bloomsbury Institute also ranked 1st best for their Law course (2nd in England), 2nd best for their Business course (3rd in England) and 3rd best for their Accounting course (14th in England).

== Student life ==
In 2022, Lord David Neuberger, Former President of the Supreme Court, opened Bloomsbury Institute’s Law Clinic, offering free legal advice to people who can’t afford a solicitor and do not qualify for legal aid. Initially focusing on Housing Law, the Clinic is run by academics from the Institute’s Law Faculty and local solicitors. Bloomsbury Institute students can also volunteer at the Clinic, as Law Clinic Advisors.

Bloomsbury Institute launched an in-house radio station, Bloomsbury Radio, in 2020. The station broadcasts a range of programmes and provides opportunities for students who wish to train as presenters as well as off-air in production, scheduling and compliance.

Bloomsbury Institute is partnered with Unlock, as part of their 'Ban the Box' campaign. In 2019, they became the first higher education provider in the UK to no longer ask anyone wishing to study at the Institute to disclose past criminal convictions.
