= List of further education colleges in England =

List of colleges

This is a list of current further education colleges that are publicly funded by the Education and Skills Funding Agency in England. The government considers colleges of the further education sector to be: "general FE (GFE) and tertiary colleges, sixth form (6F) colleges, specialist colleges (e.g. colleges of agriculture, or drama) and adult education institutes."

With a substantial number of mergers, and the foundation of many new institutions, this list is inevitably going to be incomplete or include colleges that have since merged to form new institutions, such as Hackney Community College, Tower Hamlets College, and Redbridge College now being titled New City College.

== A ==
- Abbeygate Sixth Form College (a constituent college of the Eastern Education Group)
- Abingdon and Witney College
- Access Creative College
- Accrington and Rossendale College
- Ada College (National College for Digital Skills)
- Alton College (a constituent part of Havant and South Downs College)
- Amersham & Wycombe College (a constituent college of the Buckinghamshire College Group)
- Andover College (a constituent college of the Sparsholt College)
- Aquinas College
- Ashford College (a constituent college of the East Kent College Group)
- Ashton Sixth Form College
- Askham Bryan College
- Aylesbury College (a constituent college of the Buckinghamshire College Group)

== B ==
- Banbury & Bicester College (a constituent college of Activate Learning)
- Barking and Dagenham College
- Barnet & Southgate College
- Barnfield College (a constituent college of West Hertfordshire College)
- Barnsley College
- Barnsley Sixth Form College (a constituent college of Barnsley College)
- Barton Peveril College
- Basingstoke College of Technology
- Bath College
- Bedford College (a constituent college of Bedford College Group)
- Bedford Sixth Form College (a constituent college of Bedford College Group)
- Berkshire College of Agriculture (a constituent college of Windsor Forest Colleges Group)
- Bexhill College
- Bicton College (a constituent college of Cornwall College Group)
- Bilborough Sixth Form College (a constituent college of the Better Futures Multi-Academy Trust which is in turn a subsidiary of the Coventry University Group)
- Birkenhead Sixth Form College (a constituent college of the BePART Educational Trust)
- Birmingham Metropolitan College
- Bishop Auckland College
- Bishop Burton College
- Blackburn College
- Blackpool & The Fylde College
- Blackpool Sixth Form College
- Bolton College
- Bolton Sixth Form College
- Boston College
- Bournemouth and Poole College
- Bracknell & Wokingham College (a constituent college of Activate Learning)
- Bradford College
- Braintree Sixth Form College
- Bridgwater & Taunton College
- Brighton Hove & Sussex Sixth Form College
- Broadstairs College (a constituent college of the East Kent College Group)
- Brockenhurst College
- Brooke House Sixth Form College (Now merged with New City College)
- Brooklands College
- Brooksby Melton College
- Burnley College
- Burton & South Derbyshire College
- Bury College
- Buxton & Leek College

== C ==
- Cadbury Sixth Form College
- Calderdale College
- Callywith College
- Cambridge Regional College
- Canterbury College (a constituent college of the East Kent College Group)
- Capel Manor College
- Cardinal Newman College
- Carlisle College
- Carmel College
- Carshalton College
- Central Bedfordshire College
- Cheadle and Marple Sixth Form College
- Chelmsford College
- Cheshire College – South & West
- Chesterfield College
- Chichester College
- Christ The King Sixth Form College
- Cirencester College
- City and Islington College (a constituent college of Capital City College Group)
- City College Norwich
- City College Peterborough
- City College Plymouth
- City College Southampton (a constituent college of South Hampshire College Group)
- City Literary Institute
- City of Bristol College
- City of Oxford College (a constituent college of Activate Learning)
- City of Stoke-on-Trent Sixth Form College
- City of Westminster College
- City of Wolverhampton College
- Clarendon Sixth Form College
- Cleveland College of Art And Design
- Colchester Institute
- Colchester Sixth Form College
- College of Animal Welfare
- College of Haringey, Enfield and North East London (a constituent college of Capital City College Group)
- College of North West London
- College of Richard Collyer
- College of West Anglia
- Connell Sixth Form College
- The Coopers Company and Coborn School
- Cornwall College (a constituent college of Cornwall College Group)
- Coulsdon College
- Coventry College (see City College Coventry and Henley College)
- Craven College
- Crawley College
- Cronton Sixth Form College
- Croydon College

== D ==
- Darlington College
- Dearne Valley College
- Derby College
- Dereham Sixth Form College
- Derwentside College
- Doncaster College
- Duchy College (a constituent college of Cornwall College Group)
- Dudley College of Technology
- Durham Sixth Form Centre

== E ==
- East Coast College
- East Durham College
- East Norfolk Sixth Form College
- East Riding College
- East Surrey College
- East Sussex College
- East Sussex College Hastings
- Eastleigh College
- Easton College
- Elliott Hudson College
- Esher College
- Exeter College (a constituent college of the Exeter and North Devon Colleges Group)

== F ==
- Falmouth Marine School (a constituent college of Cornwall College Group)
- Fareham College
- Farnborough College of Technology
- Farnborough Sixth Form College
- Farnham Sixth Form College (a constituent college of Activate Learning)
- Fashion Retail Academy
- Fircroft College
- Folkstone College (a constituent college of the East Kent College Group)
- Franklin College
- Furness College

== G ==
- Gateshead College
- Gateway College (a constituent college of Better Futures Multi-Academy Trust which is in turn a subsidiary of the Coventry University Group)
- Glossopdale School
- Gloucestershire College
- Godalming College
- Goole College
- Grantham College
- Greater Brighton Metropolitan College
- Greenhead College
- Grimsby Institute
- Guildford College

== H ==
- Hadlow College
- Halesowen College
- Haringey Sixth Form College
- Harlow College
- Harrogate College
- Harrow College
- Hartlepool College of Further Education
- Hartlepool Sixth Form College
- Hartpury College
- Havant and South Downs College (see Alton College, Havant College and South Downs College)
- Havering College of Further and Higher Education
- Havering Sixth Form College
- Heart of Worcestershire College
- Henley College
- Hereford College of Arts
- Hereford Sixth Form College
- Herefordshire and Ludlow College
- Hereward College
- Hertford Regional College
- Highbury College
- Hillcroft College
- Hills Road Sixth Form College
- Holy Cross College
- Hopwood Hall College
- Huddersfield New College
- Hugh Baird College
- Hull College

== I ==
- Isle of Wight College
- Itchen College

== J ==
- John Leggott College
- John Ruskin College
- Joseph Chamberlain Sixth Form College

== K ==
- Keighley College
- Kendal College
- Kensington and Chelsea College
- Kidderminster College
- King Edward VI College, Nuneaton
- King Edward VI College, Stourbridge
- King George V College
- Kingston College
- Kingston Maurward College (a constituent college of the Coastland College)
- Kirklees College
- Knowsley Community College

== L ==
- Lakes College
- Lambeth College
- Lancaster and Morecambe College
- Leeds City College
- Leeds College of Building
- Leicester College
- Lewisham Southwark College
- Leyton Sixth Form College
- Lincoln College
- London College of Beauty Therapy
- London South East Colleges (see Bexley College, Bromley College and Greenwich Community College)
- Long Road Sixth Form College
- Longley Park Sixth Form
- Loreto College
- Loughborough College
- Lowestoft Sixth Form College
- Ludlow College
- Luton Sixth Form College

== M ==
- Macclesfield College
- The Manchester College
- Marine Society College
- Mary Ward Centre
- Merrist Wood College (a constituent college of Activate Learning)
- Merton College (previously part of South Thames College)
- Middlesbrough College
- MidKent College
- Milton Keynes College
- Moorlands Sixth Form College
- Morley College
- Moulton College
- Myerscough College

== N ==
- National College Creative Industries
- National College for High Speed Rail
- National College for Nuclear
- National Extension College
- Nelson and Colne College
- New City College (see Brooke House Sixth Form College, Epping Forest College, Hackney Community College, Havering College of Further and Higher Education, Havering Sixth Form College, Redbridge College and Tower Hamlets College)
- New College Bradford
- New College Doncaster
- New College Durham
- New College, Pontefract
- New College Swindon
- Newbury College
- Newcastle College
- Newcastle Sixth Form College
- Newcastle-under-Lyme College
- Newham College of Further Education
- Newham Sixth Form College
- North East Surrey College of Technology
- North Hertfordshire College
- North Lindsey College
- North Nottinghamshire College
- North Shropshire College
- North Warwickshire and South Leicestershire College (see North Warwickshire and Hinckley College & South Leicestershire College)
- North West Kent College
- Northampton College
- Northbrook Metropolitan College
- Northern College
- Northern College of Art
- Northumberland College
- Notre Dame Catholic Sixth Form College
- Nottingham College (see Central College Nottingham and New College Nottingham)

== O ==
- Oaklands College
- Oldham College
- Oldham Sixth Form College

== P ==
- Padworth College (closed 2025)
- Palmer's College (a constituent part of United Seevic Palmer's College)
- Paston College
- Peter Symonds College
- Peterborough College
- Petroc College (a constituent college of the Exeter and North Devon Colleges Group)
- Plumpton College
- Plymouth College of Art and Design
- Portland College
- Portsmouth College
- Preston's College
- Priestley College
- Prior Pursglove College
- Prospects College of Advanced Technology

== Q ==
- Queen Alexandra College
- Queen Alexandra Sixth Form College (a constituent part of Tyne Metropolitan College)
- Queen Elizabeth Sixth Form College (a constituent college of the Northern Arch Learning Partnership)
- Queen Mary's College

== R ==
- Reading College (a constituent college of Activate Learning)
- Reaseheath College
- Redbridge Institute (Redbridge Borough Council's adult education service)
- Reigate College
- Richard Huish College
- Richard Taunton Sixth Form College (a constituent college of the Lighthouse Learning Trust)
- Richmond and Hillcroft Adult Community College
- Richmond upon Thames College
- Riseholme College (a constituent college of Bishop Burton College)
- Riverside College
- Rochdale Sixth Form College (a constituent college of the Altus Education Partnership)
- Rotherham College of Arts and Technology (a constituent college of the RNN Group)
- Royal National College for the Blind
- Runshaw College
- Ruskin College (a constituent college of the University of West London)

== S ==
- Saint Brendan's Sixth Form College
- Saint Charles Catholic Sixth Form College
- Saint Dominic's Sixth Form College
- Saint Francis Xavier Sixth Form College
- Saint Helens College
- Saint John Rigby College
- Saint Mary's College
- Saint Vincent College
- Salford City College
- Salisbury Sixth Form College
- Sandwell College
- Scarborough Sixth Form College
- Scarborough TEC (previously Yorkshire Coast College and now part of the Grimsby Institute of Further & Higher Education))
- Seevic College (a constituent part of United Seevic Palmer's College)
- Selby College (a constituent college of the Heart of Yorkshire Education Group)
- Sheffield College
- Sheppey College (a constituent college of the East Kent College Group)
- Shipley College
- Shooters Hill Sixth Form College
- Shrewsbury College
- Shrewsbury Sixth Form College
- Shuttleworth College
- Sir George Monoux College
- Sir John Deane's College
- Skegness TEC (formally Lincolnshire Regional College and now part of the Grimsby Institute of Further & Higher Education)
- Slough & Langley College (a constituent college of Windsor Forest College Group)
- Solihull College
- Solihull Sixth Form College
- South and City College Birmingham
- South Devon College
- South Essex College
- South Gloucestershire and Stroud College
- South Staffordshire College
- South Thames College
- South Tyneside College
- Southport College
- Sparsholt College
- Stafford College
- Stamford College
- Stanmore College
- Stephenson College
- Stockport College
- Stockton Riverside College
- Stockton Sixth Form College
- Stoke-on-Trent College
- Stratford-upon-Avon College
- Strode College
- Strode's College (a constituent college of Windsor Forest College Group)
- Suffolk New College
- Suffolk One Sixth Form College (a constituent college of the Eastern Education Group)
- Sunderland College
- Sutton College
- Swindon College

== T ==
- Tameside College
- Telford College of Arts and Technology
- The Leys College (a constituent college of Activate Learning)
- Thomas Rotherham College
- Totton College
- Trafford College
- Tresham College of Further and Higher Education
- Truro and Penwith College
- Tunnelling & Underground Construction Academy
- Tyne Metropolitan College

== U ==
- University College Birmingham
- UTC South Durham
- Uxbridge College

== V ==
- Varndean College

== W ==
- Wakefield College (a constituent college of the Heart of Yorkshire Education Group)
- Walsall College
- Waltham Forest College
- Warrington and Vale Royal College (see Mid Cheshire College and Warrington Collegiate)
- Warwickshire College Group (see Warwickshire College & Malvern Hills College)
- Welbeck Defence Sixth Form College
- West Herts College
- West Kent College
- West Lancashire College
- West London College
- West Nottinghamshire College
- West Suffolk College (constituent college of the Eastern Education Group)
- West Thames College
- Westminster Kingsway College (a constituent college of Capital City College Group)
- Weston College
- Weymouth College (a constituent part of the Coastland College)
- Wigan and Leigh College
- Wilberforce College
- William Morris Sixth Form College
- Wiltshire College
- Windsor College (a constituent college of Windsor Forest Colleges Group)
- Winstanley College
- Wirral Metropolitan College
- Woking College
- Woodhouse College
- Worcester Sixth Form College
- Working Men's College
- Worthing College
- Writtle College (a constituent part of Anglia Ruskin University)
- Wyggeston and Queen Elizabeth I College (see Regent College)
- Wyke College

== X ==
- Xaverian College

== Y ==
- Yeovil College
- York College

== Gallery ==
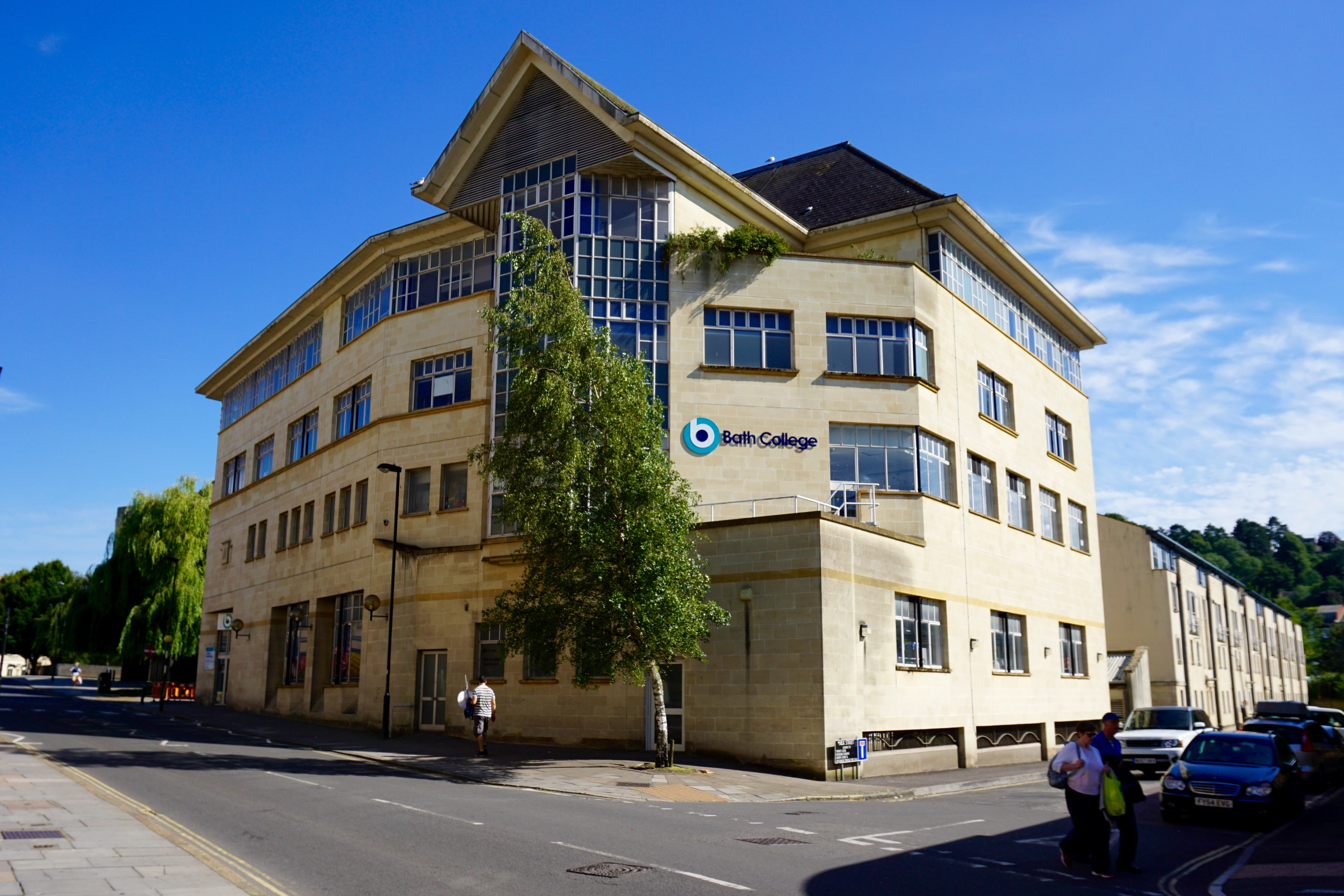
Bath College's Allen Building

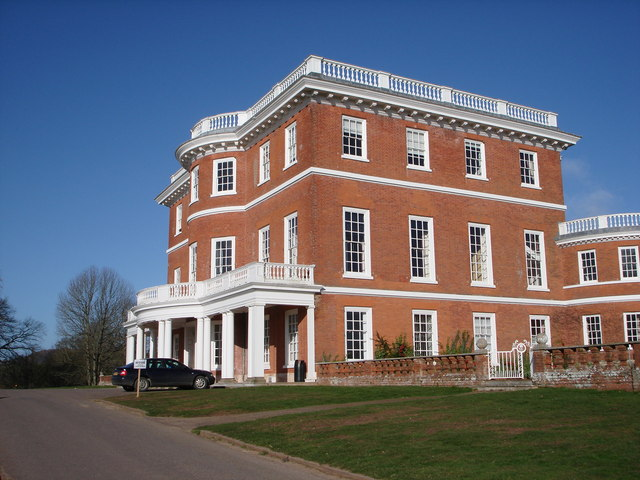
Bicton College's Main Building

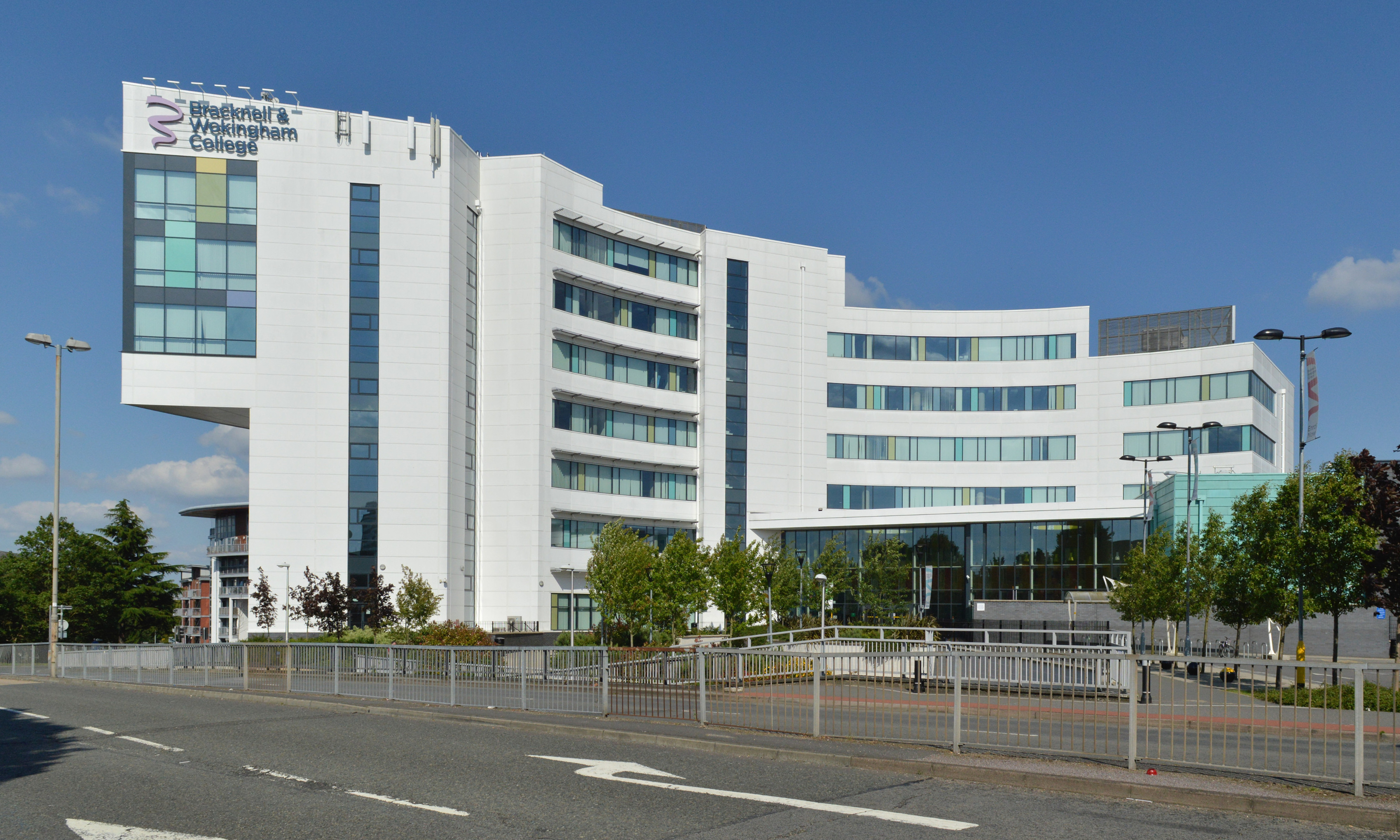
Bracknell and Wokingham College's Church Road Centre

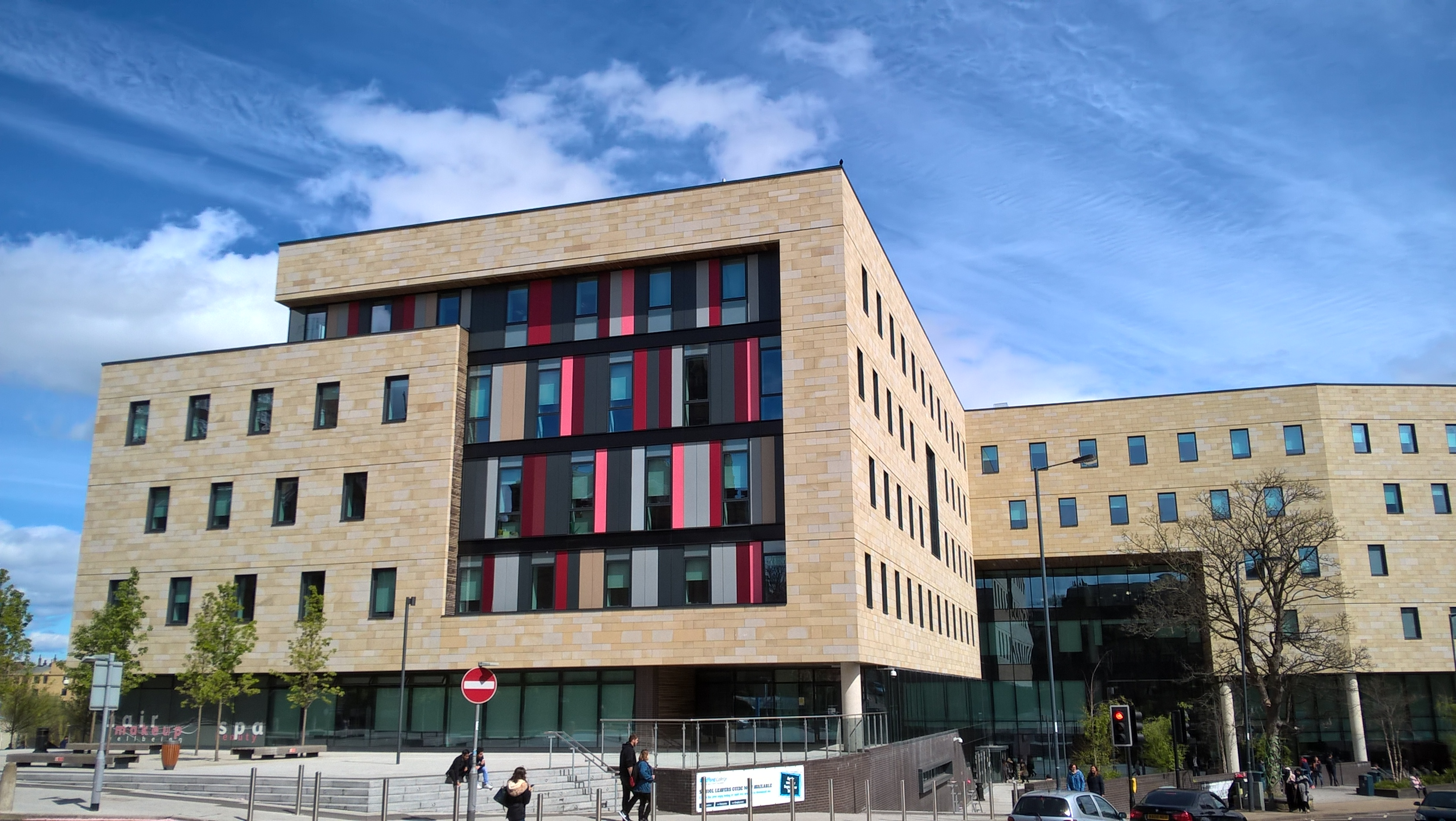
Bradford College's David Hockney Building, named for painter David Hockney

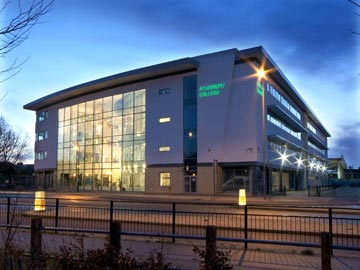
Buckingham College Group's Aylesbury Campus

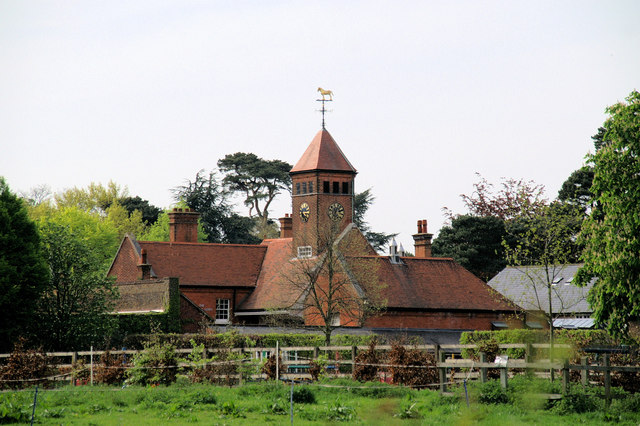
Capel Manor College's Stable Block

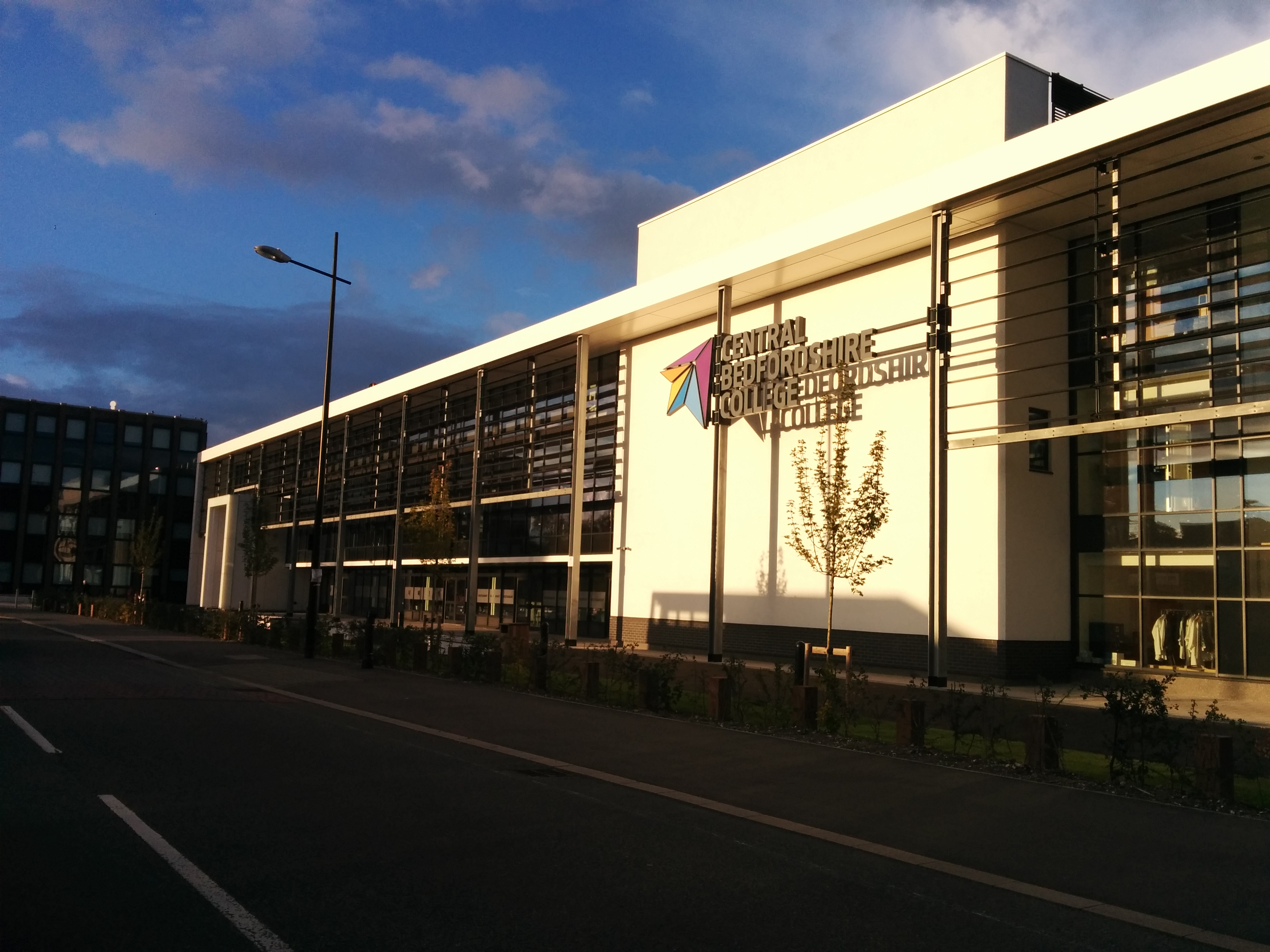
Central Bedfordshire College's Main Building

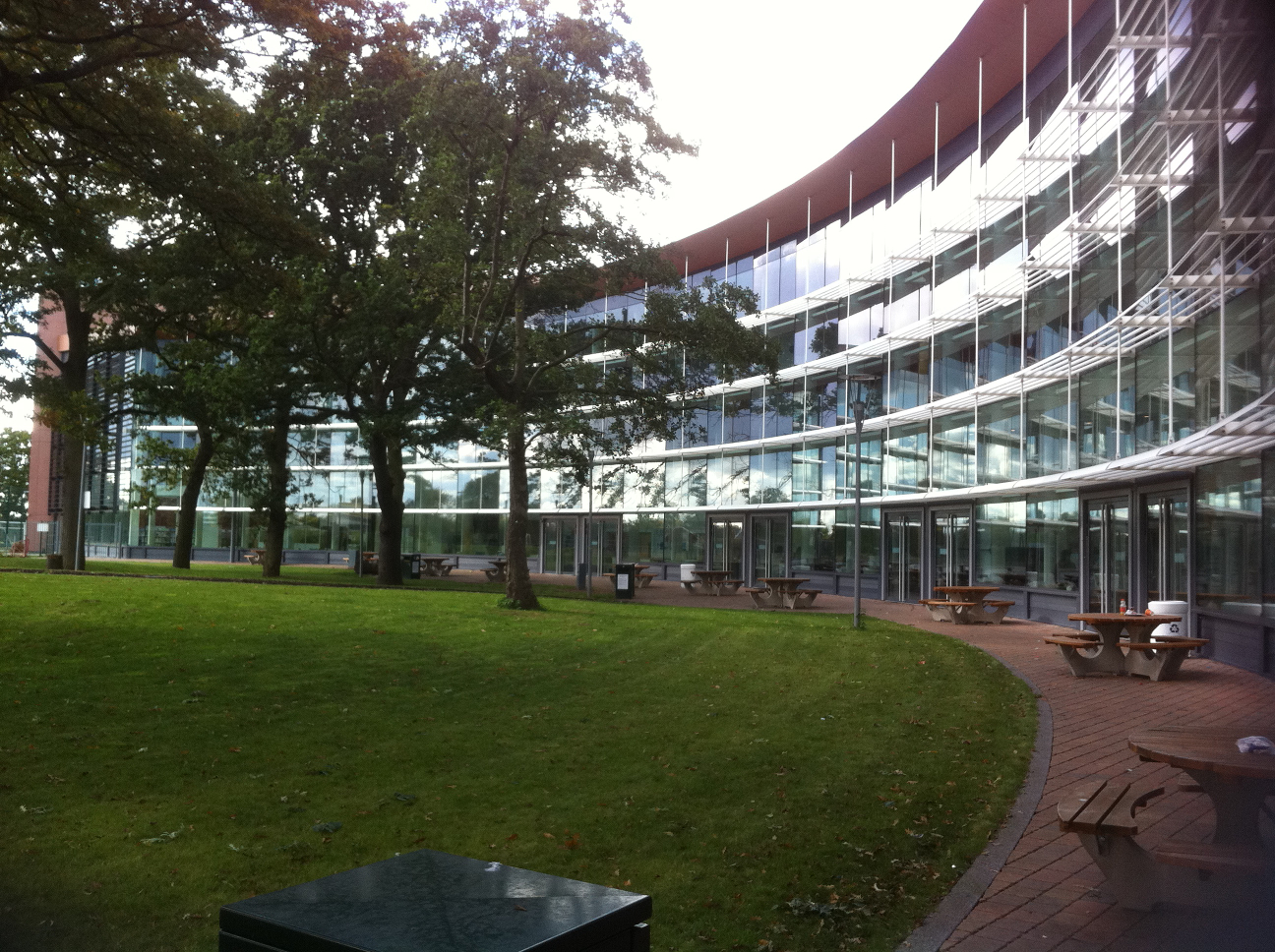
Cheshire College's Crewe Campus

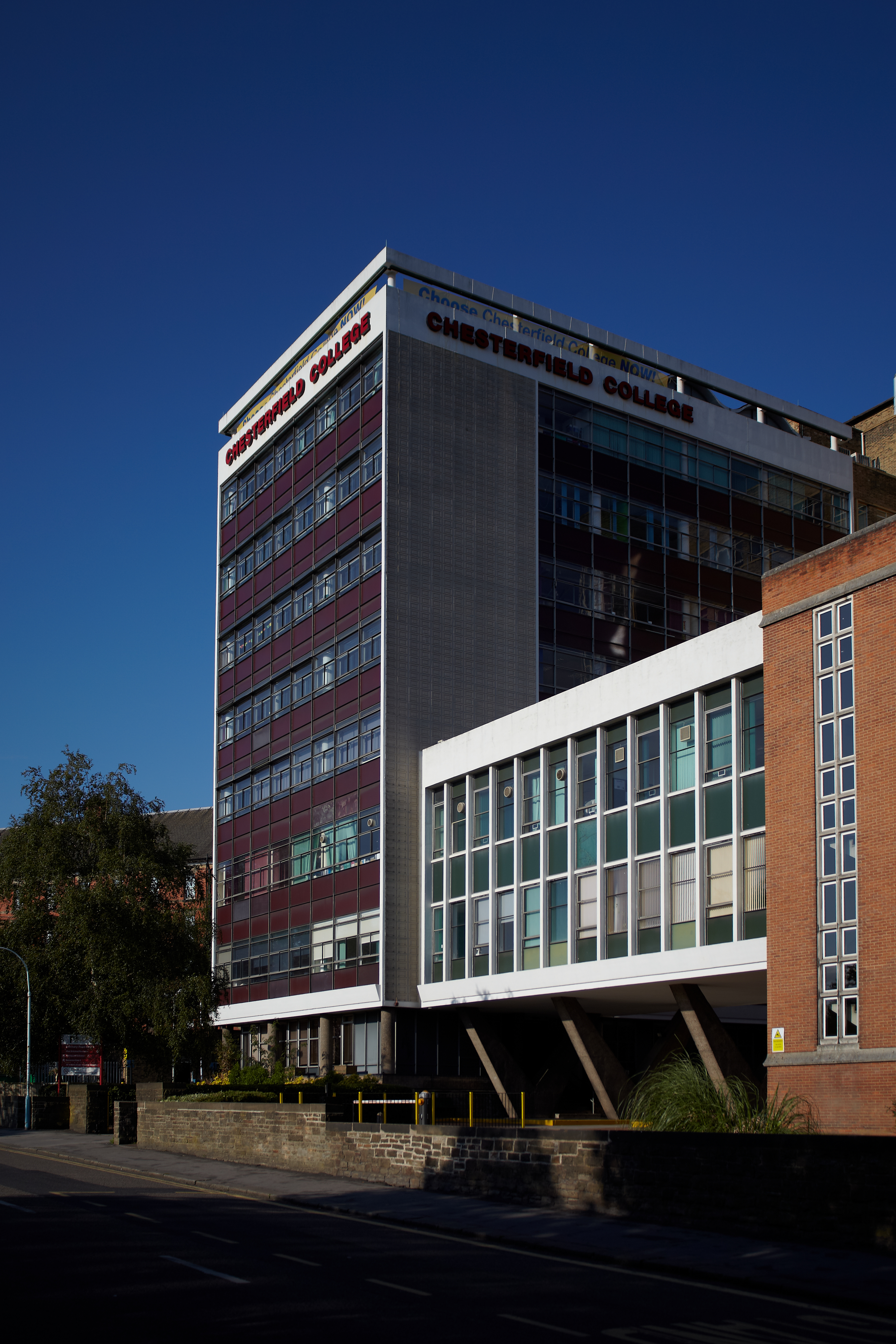
Chesterfield College's South Block

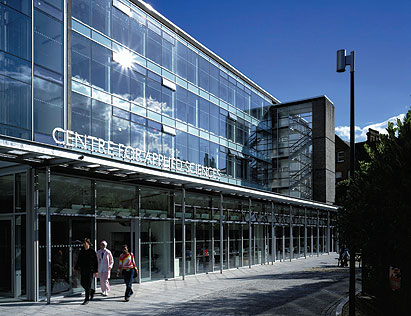
City and Islington College's Centre for Applied Sciences

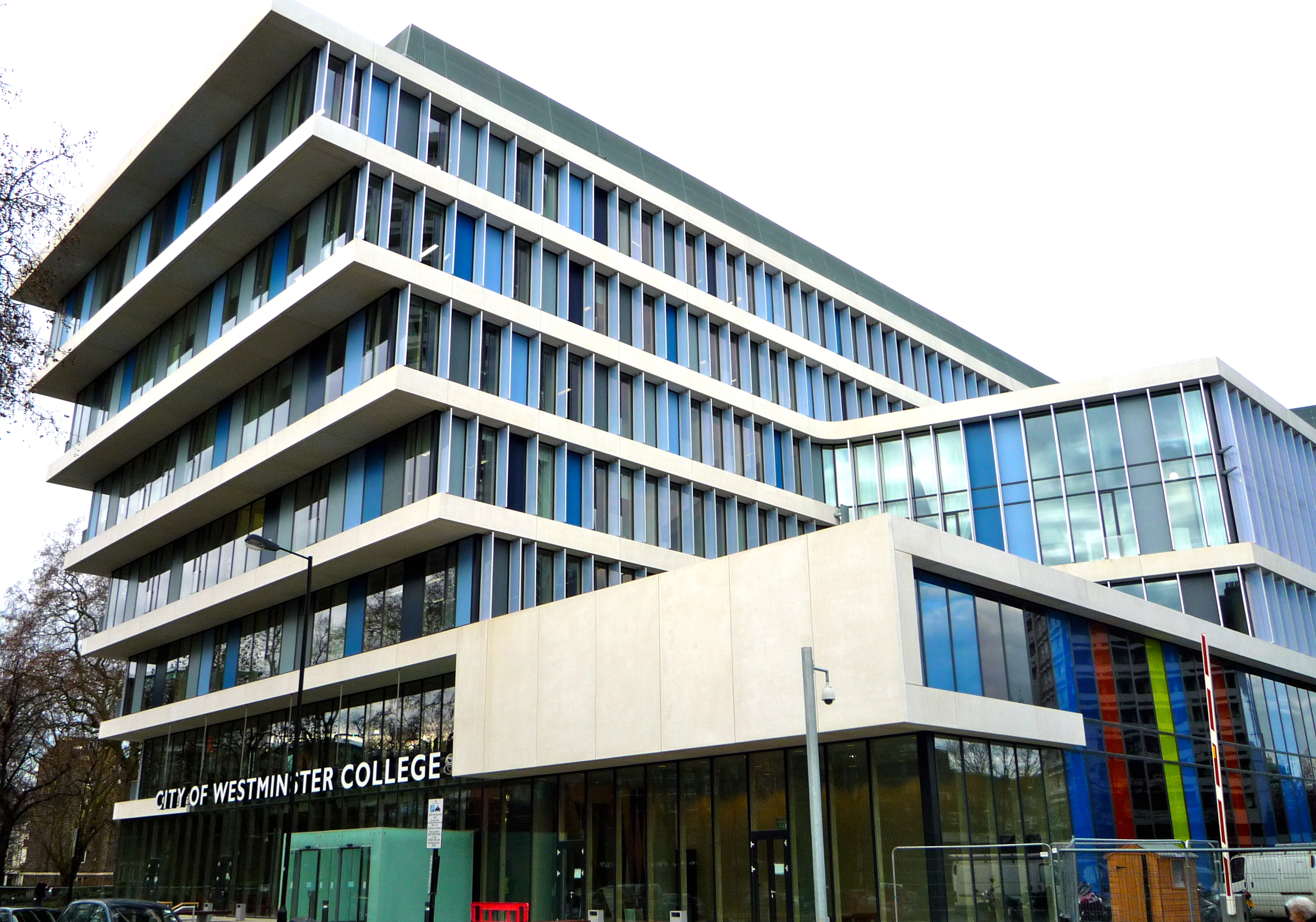
City of Westminster College's Paddington Green Campus

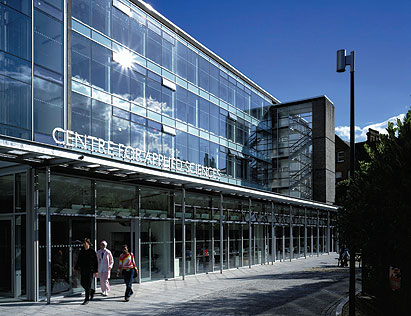
City and Islington College's Centre for Applied Sciences

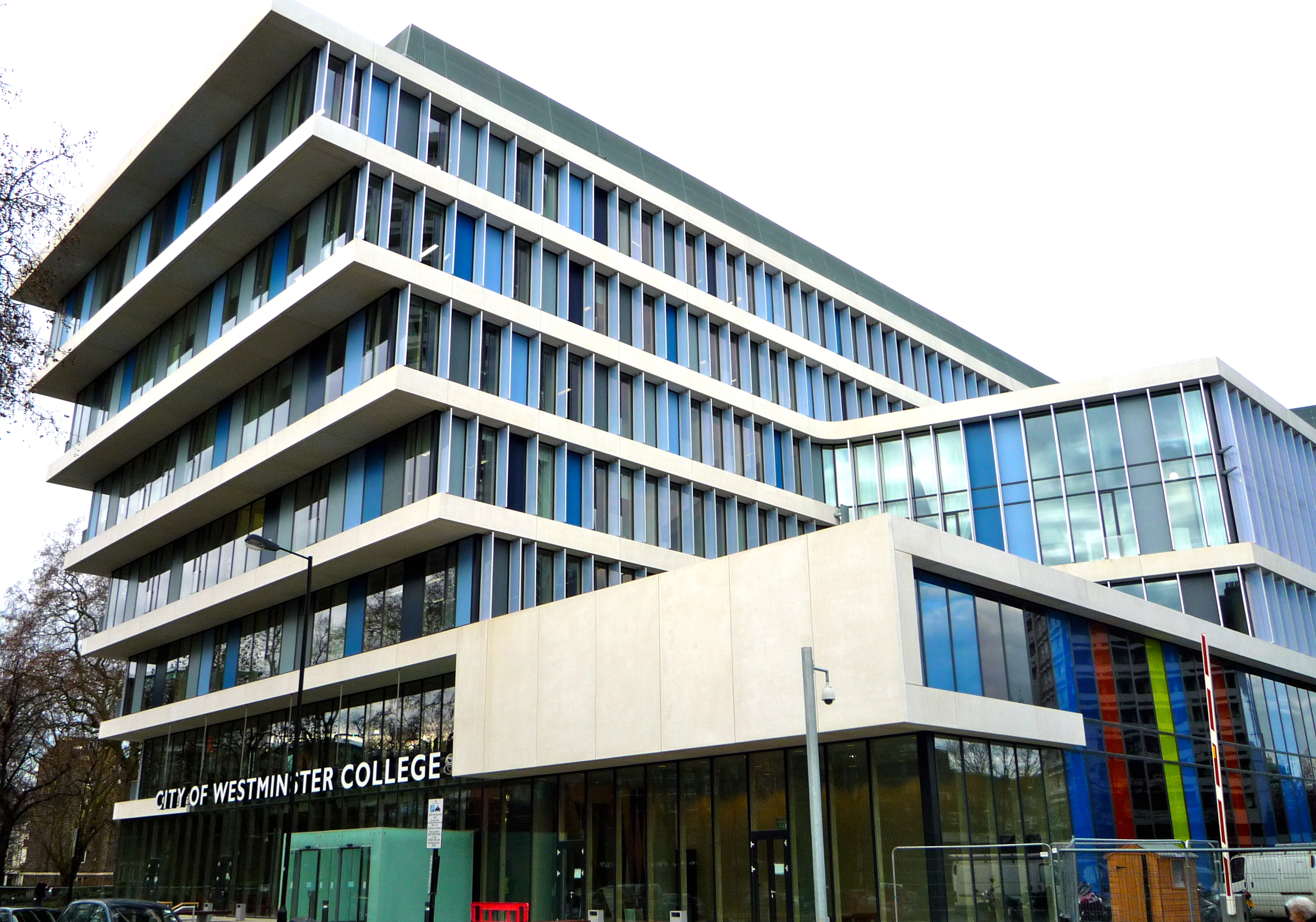
City of Westminster College Paddington Green

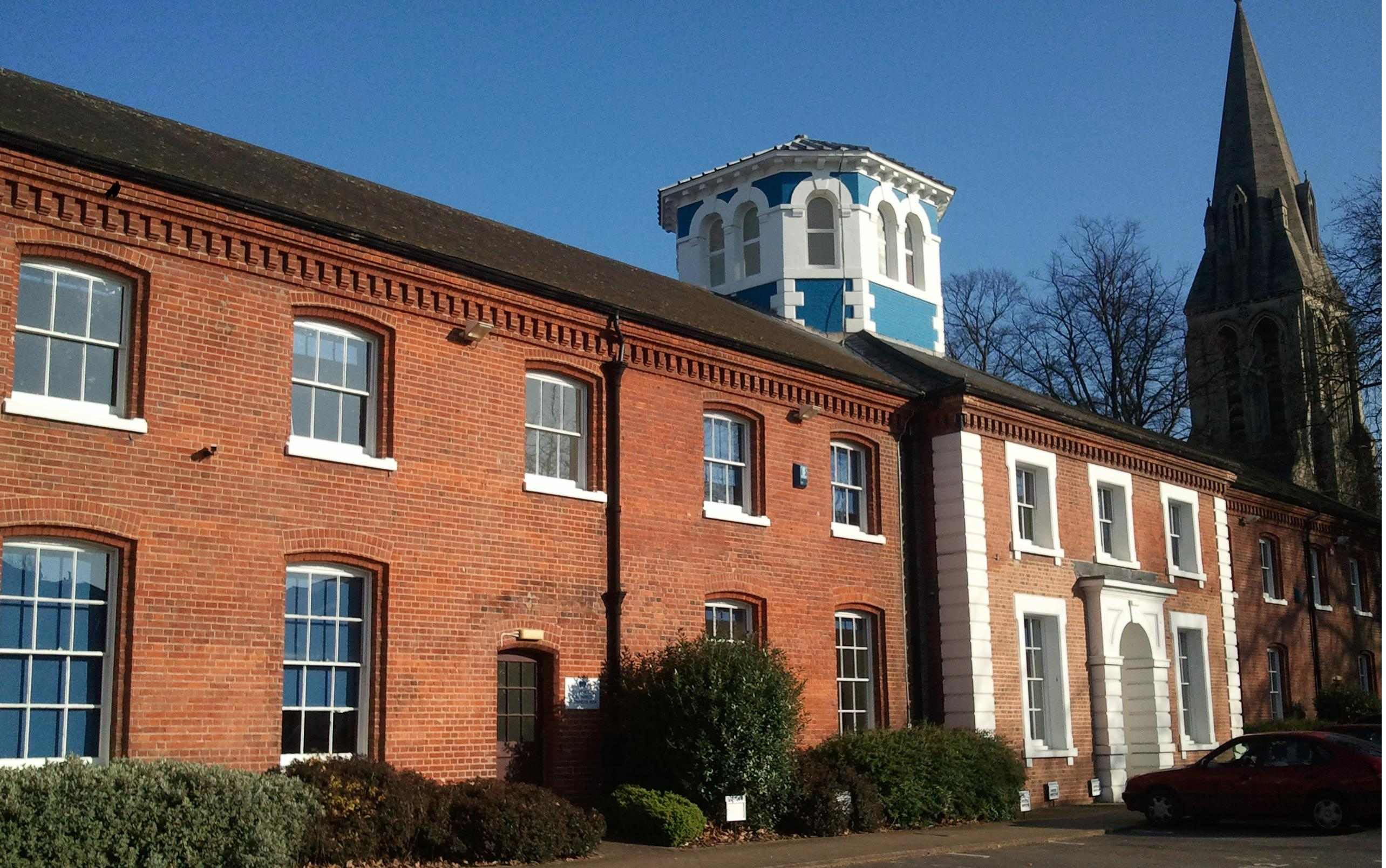
Southampton City College's Saint Mary Street Campus

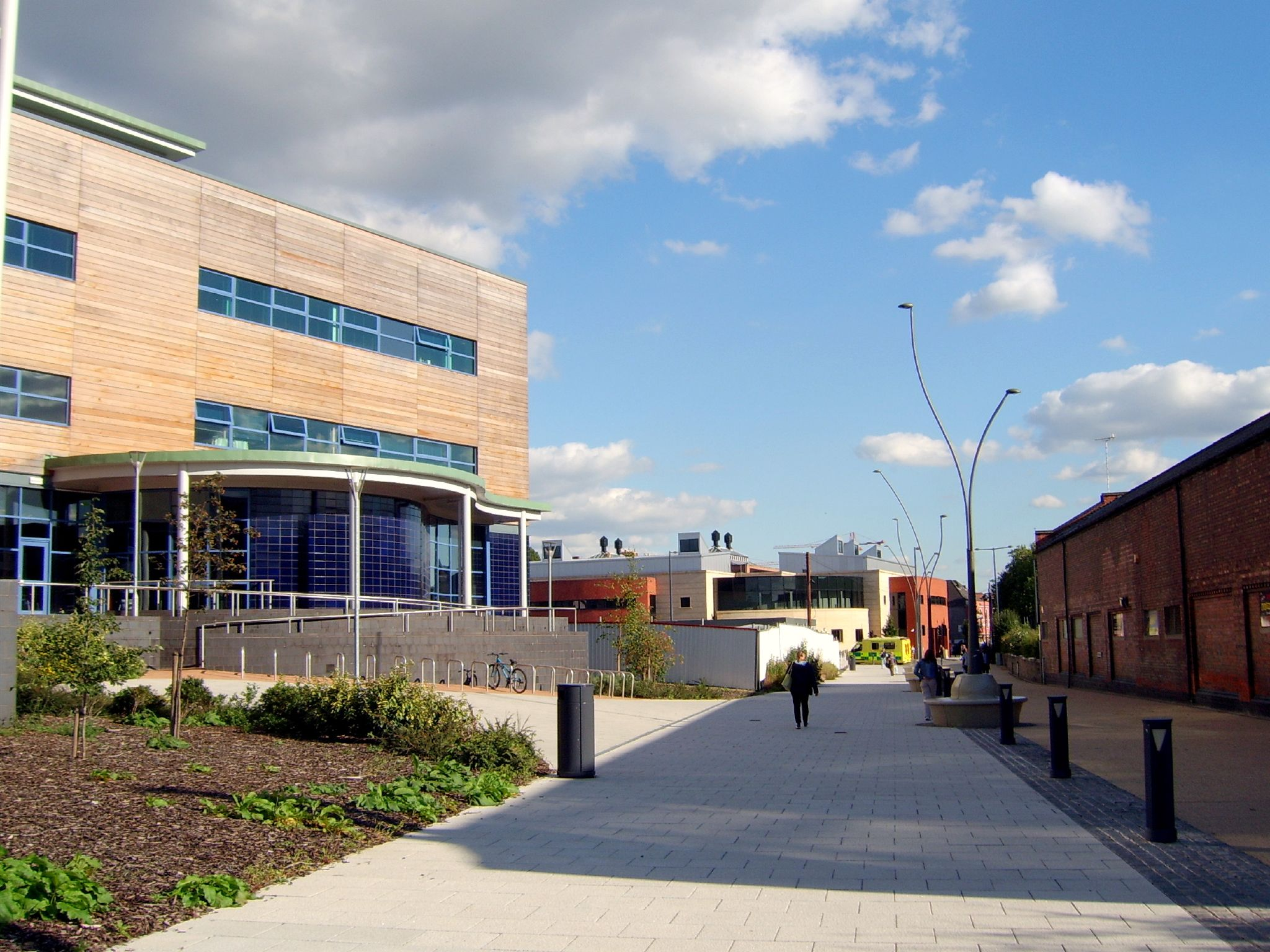
Derby College's Joseph Wright Centre, named for painter Joseph Wright

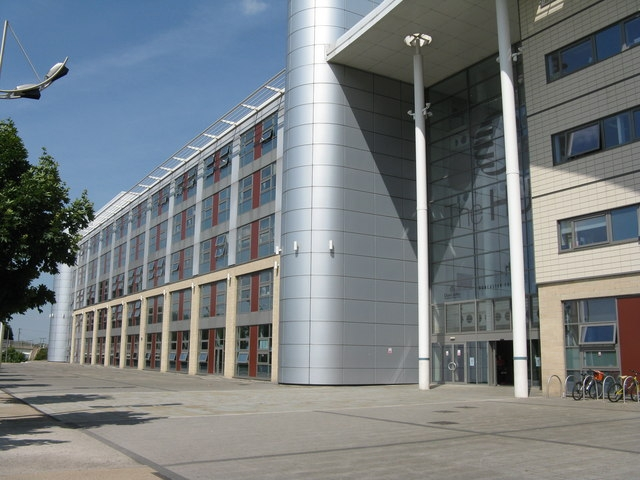
Doncaster College's The Hub

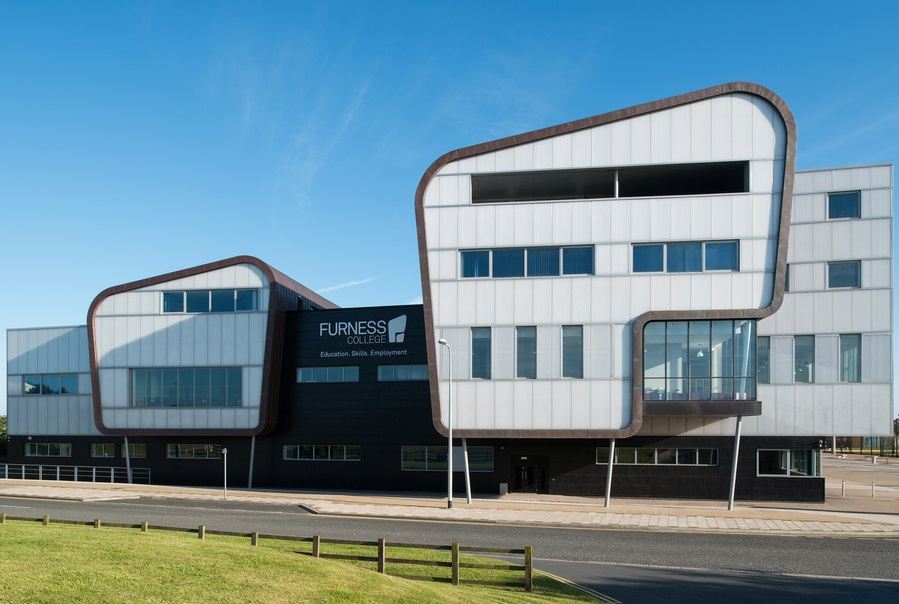
Furness College's Channelside Campus

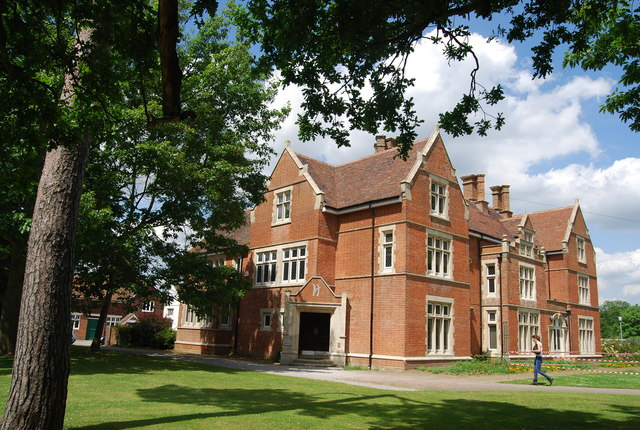
Hadlow College's Garrad House

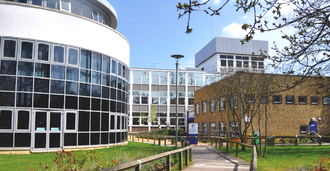
Havering College's Ardleigh Green Campus

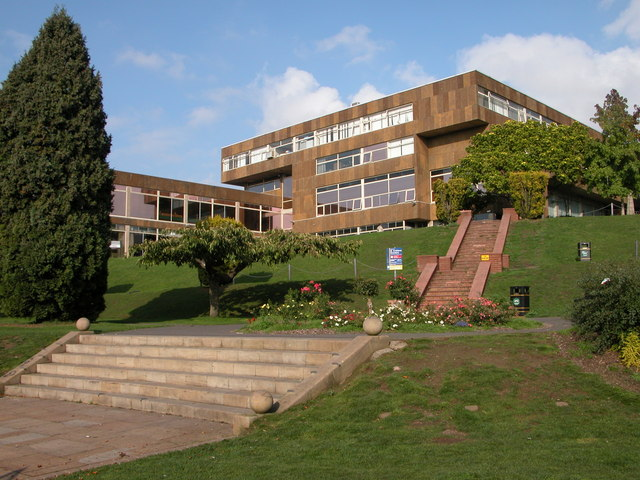
Heart of Worcestershire College's All Saints Building

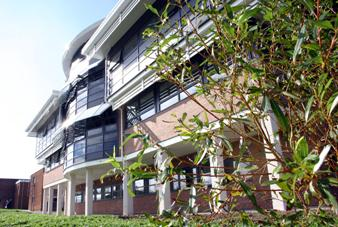
Isle of Wight College's Main Campus

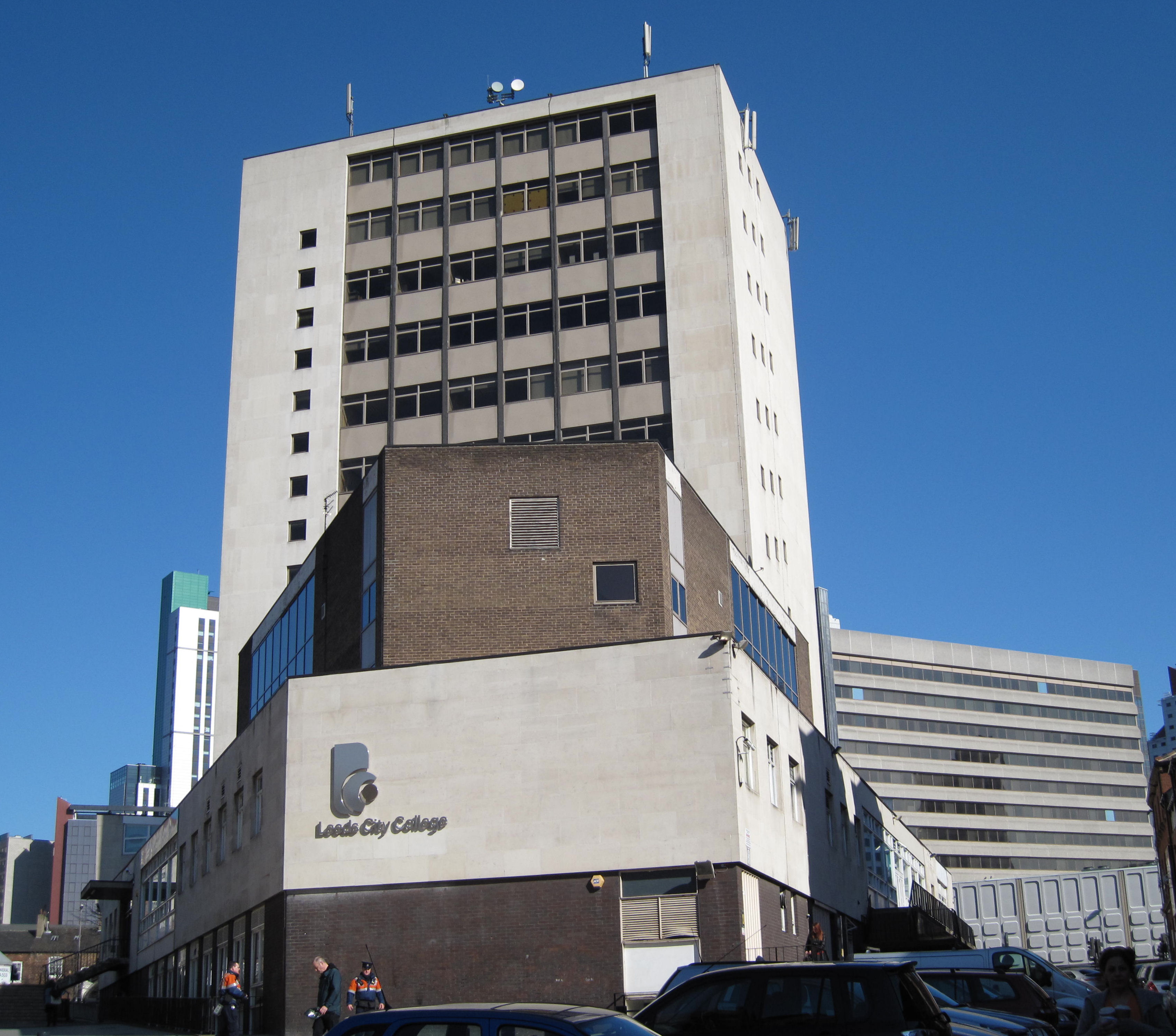
Leeds City College's Technology Campus

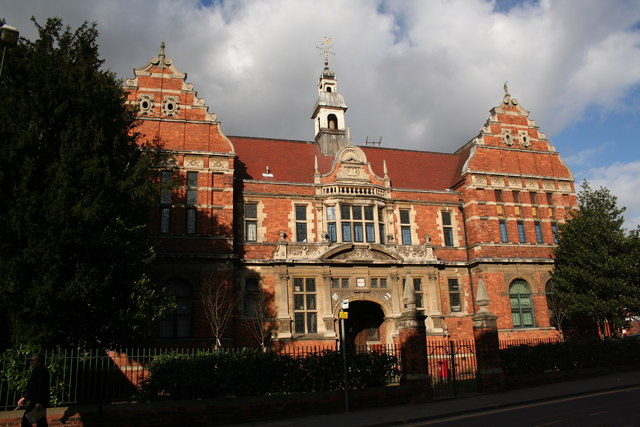
Lincoln College's Gibney Building

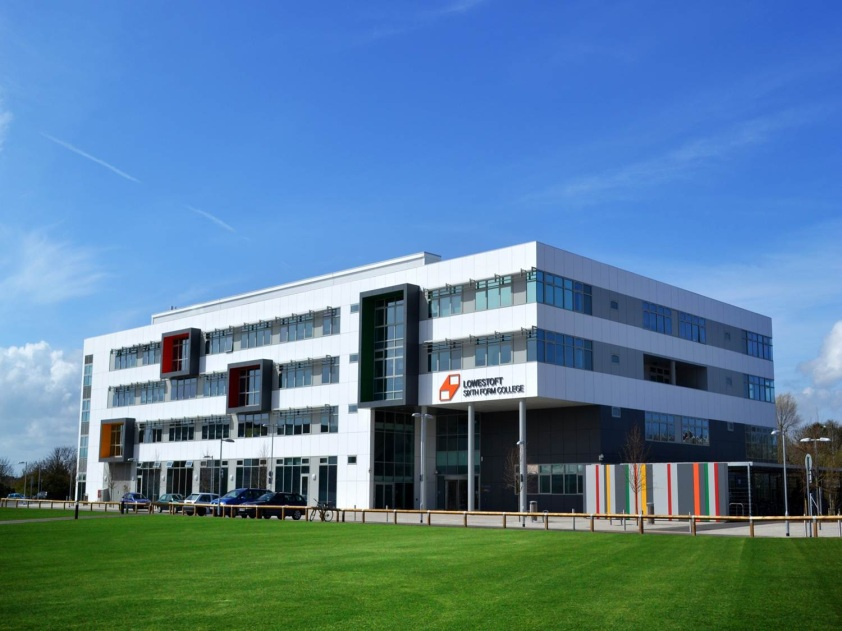
Lowestoft Sixth Form College

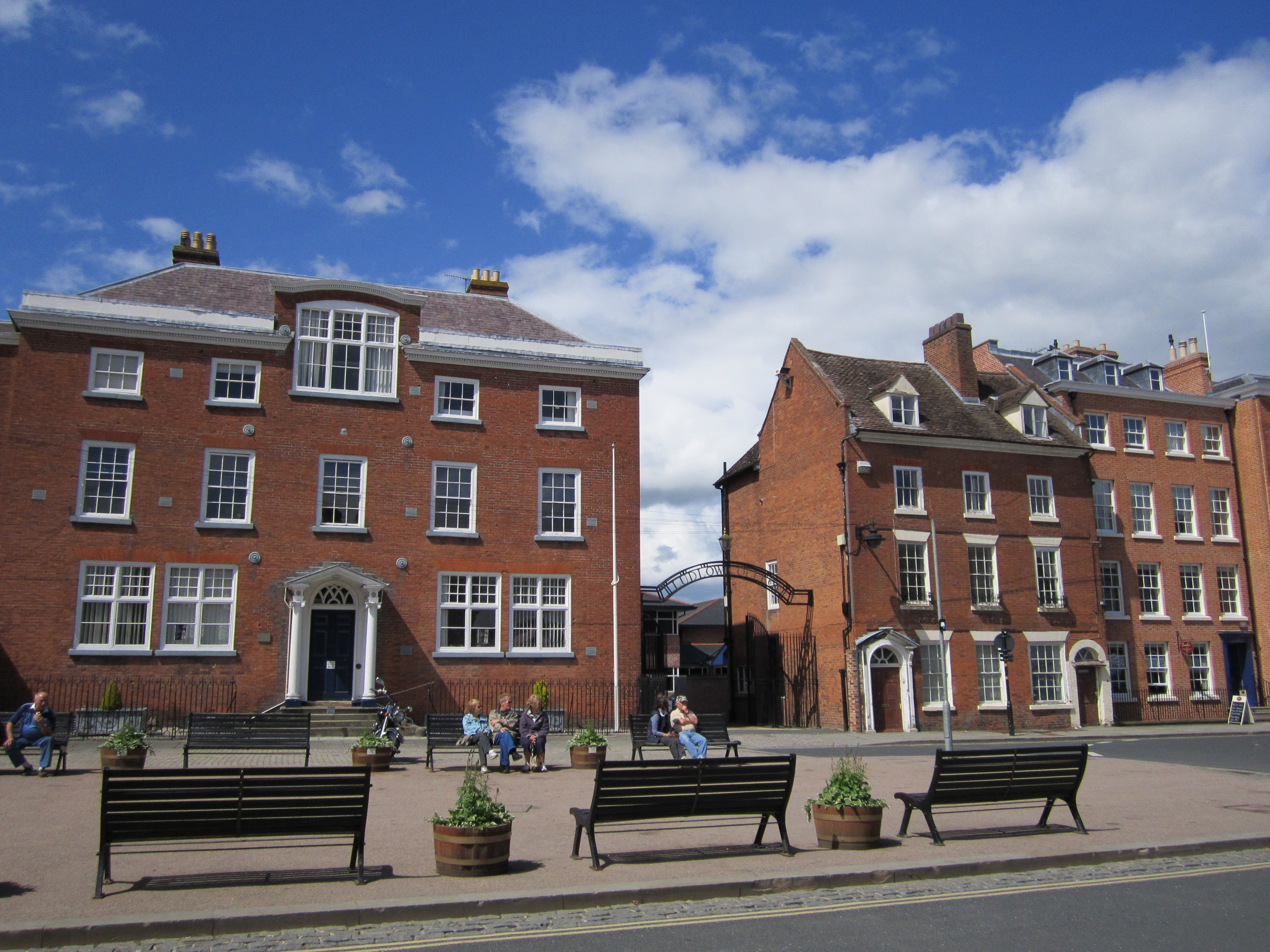
Ludlow College

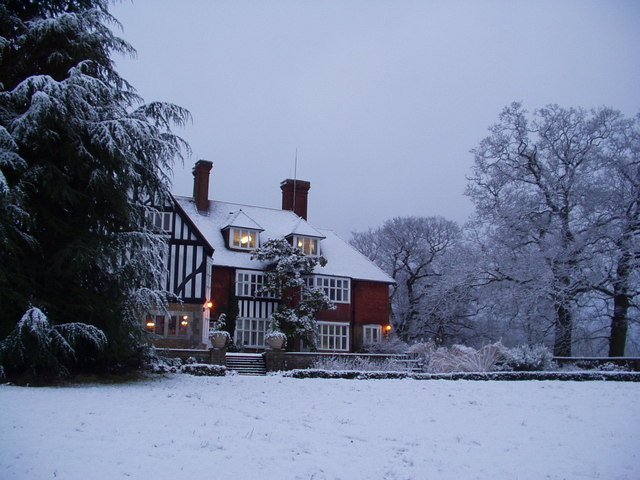
Merrist Wood College

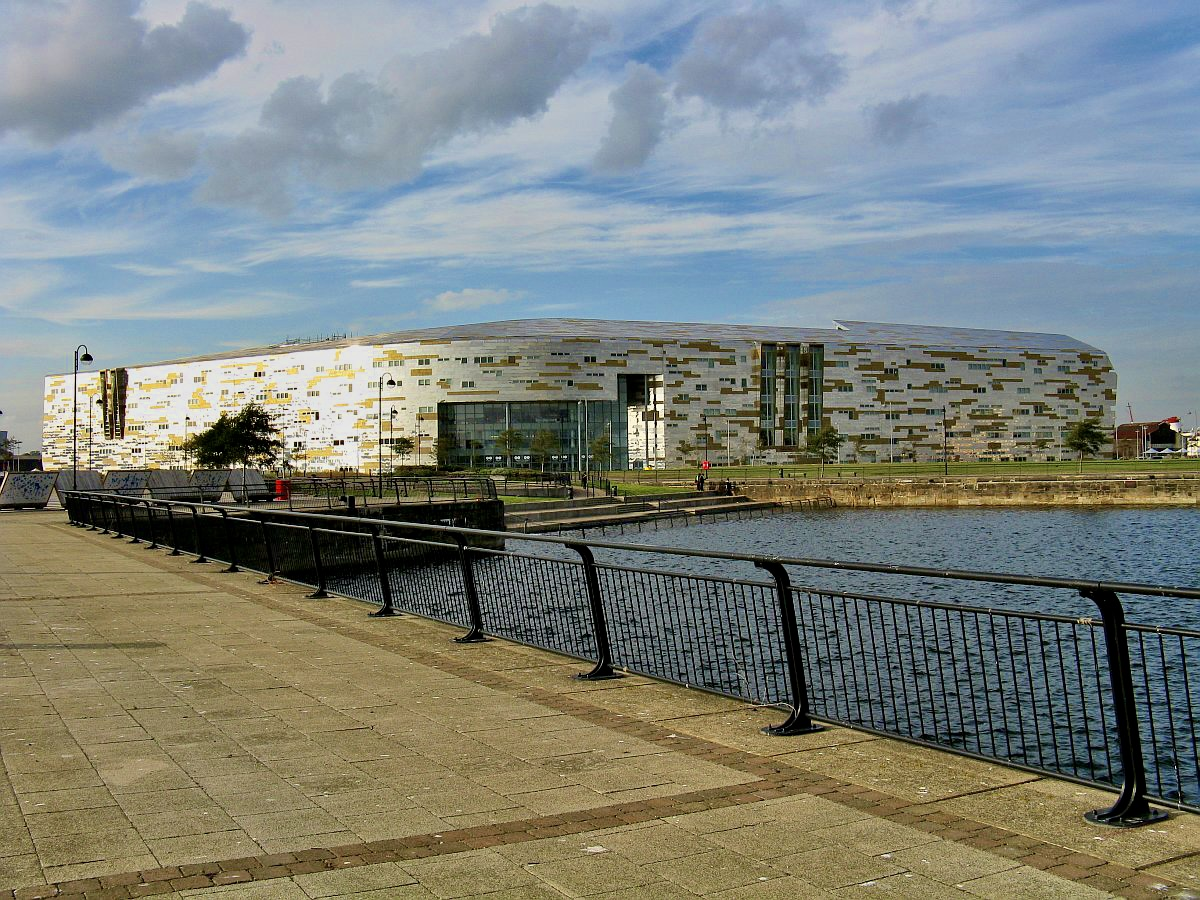
Middlesbrough College's Main Building

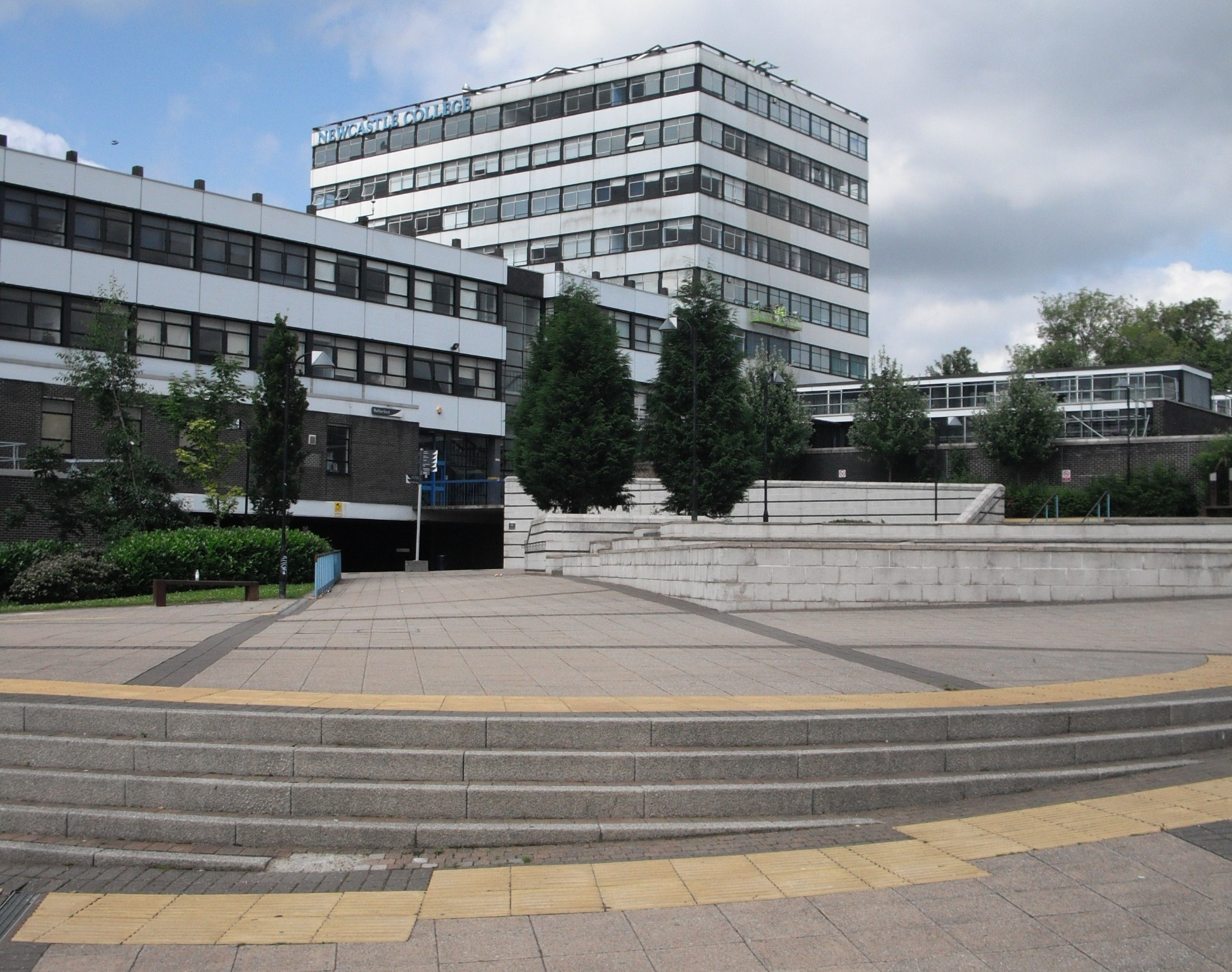
Newcastle College's Rutherford and Trevelyan Buildings

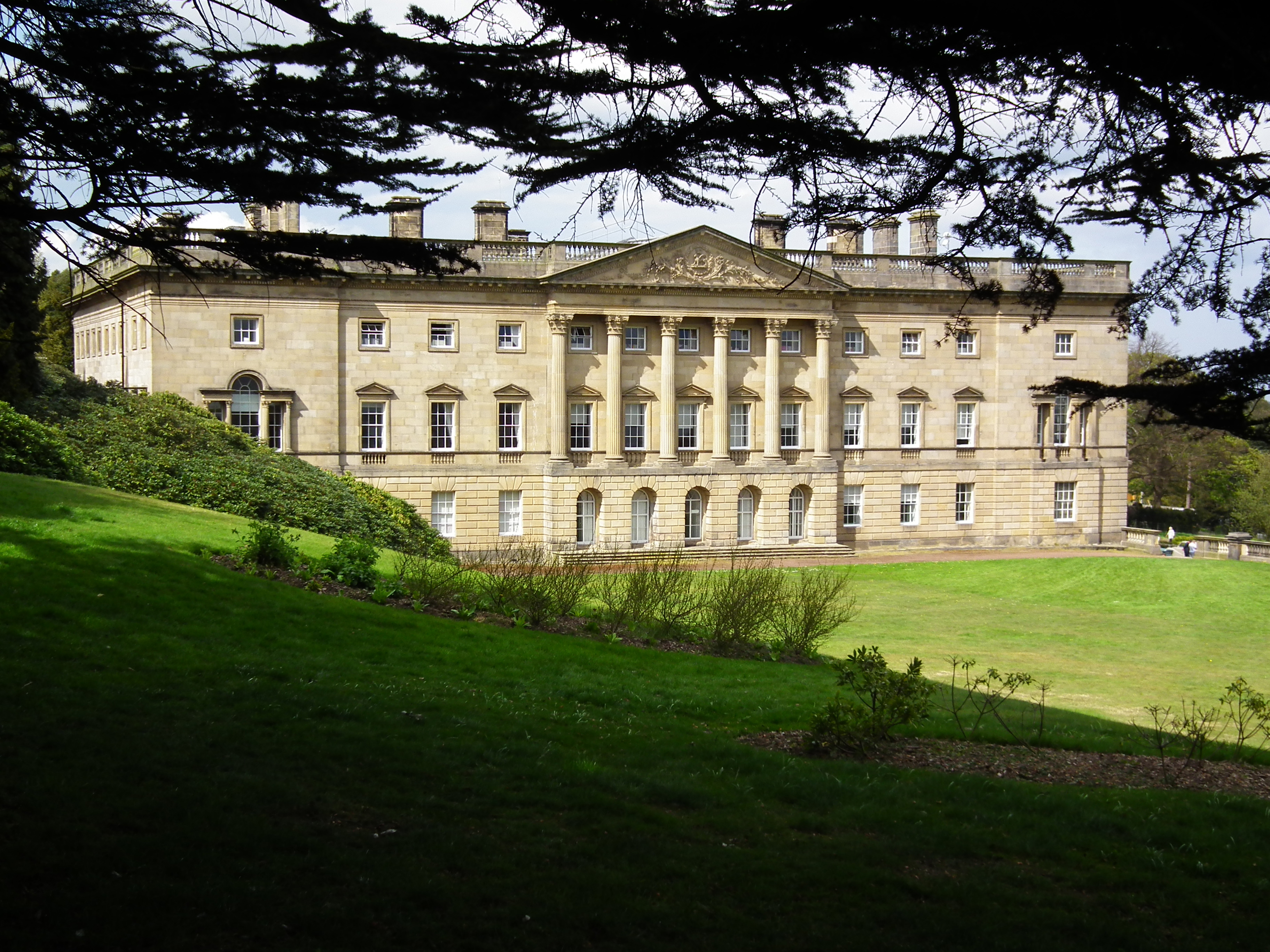
Northern College

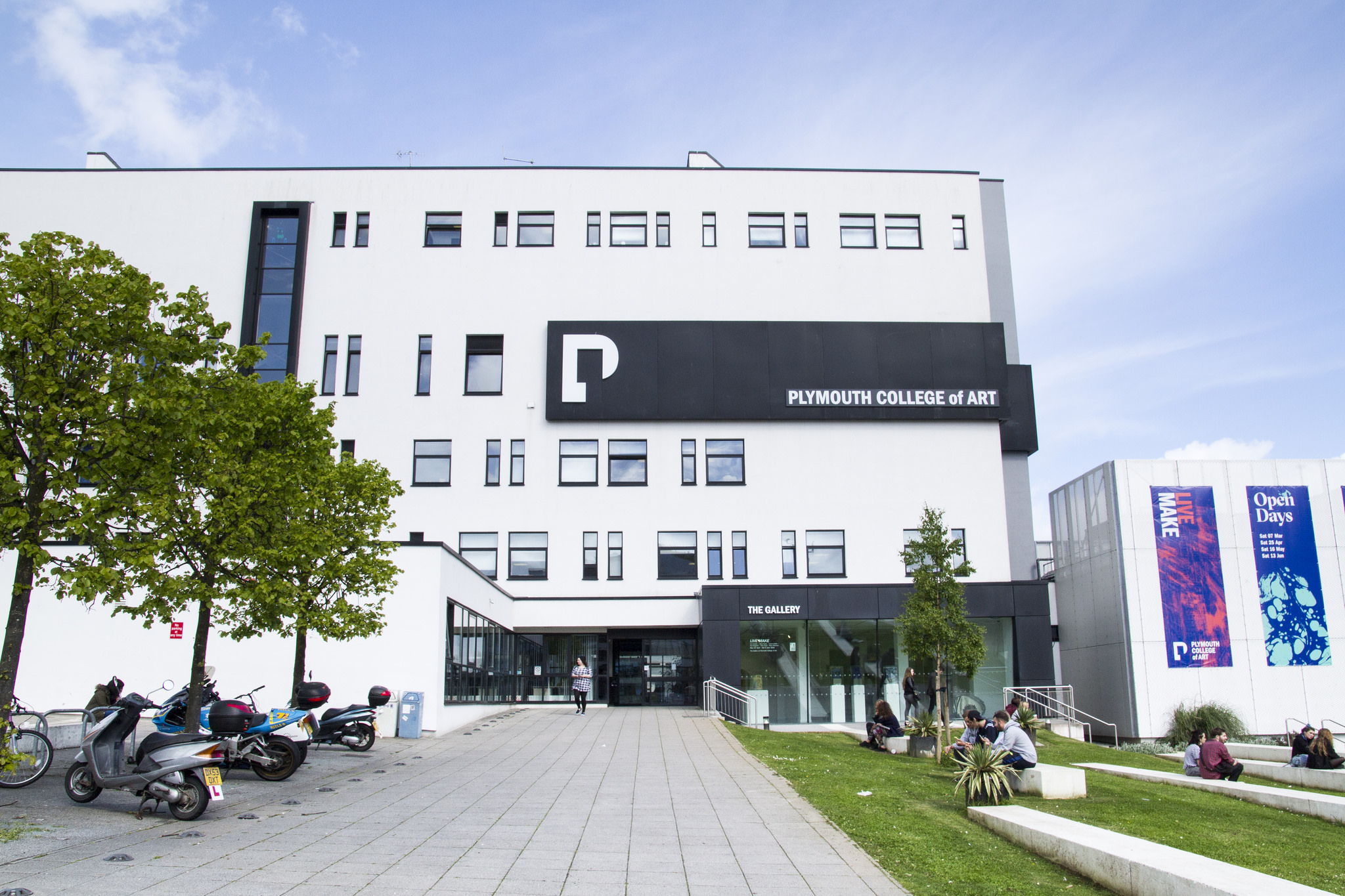
Plymouth College of Art and Design's Main Building and Gallery

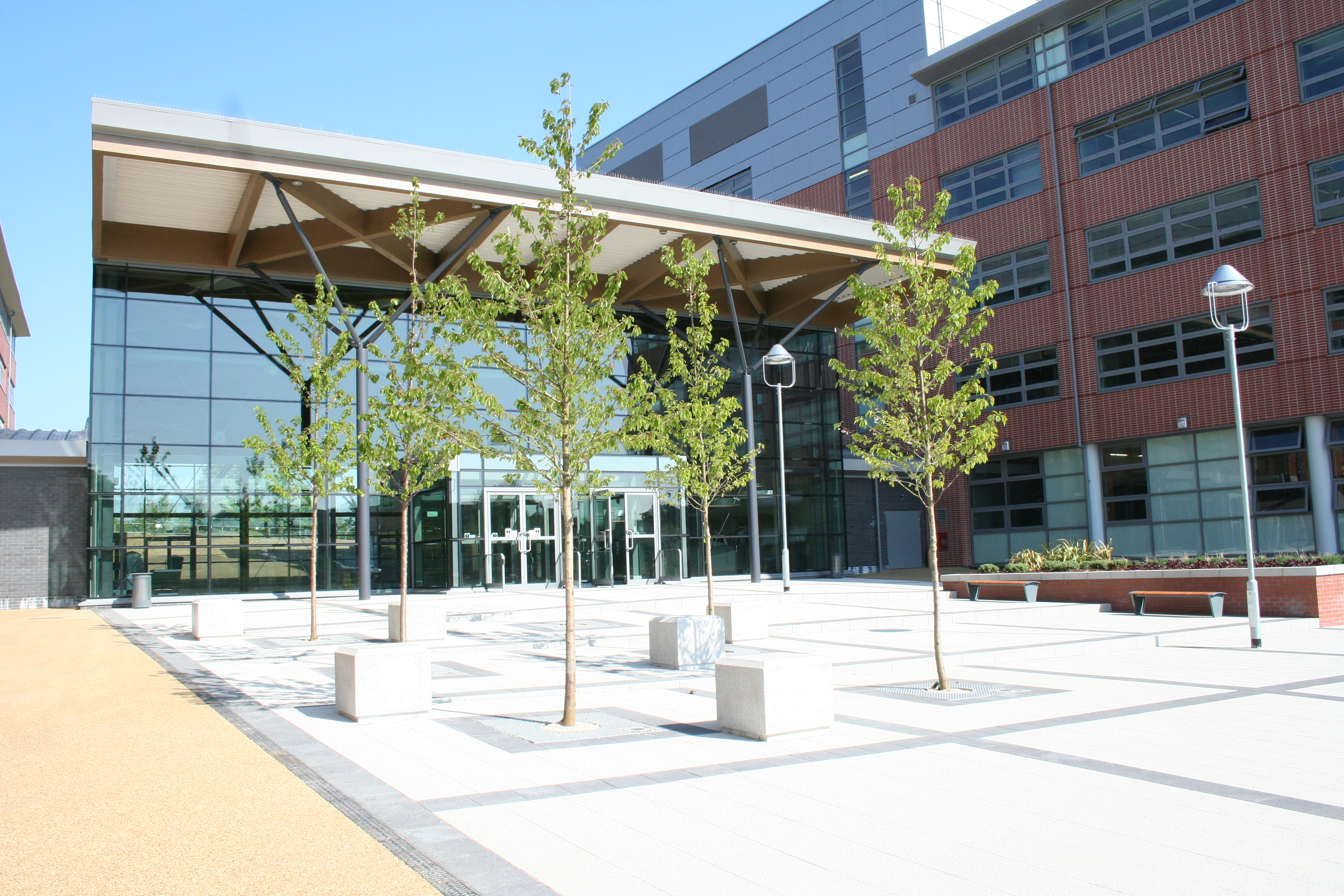
MidKent College's Medway Campus

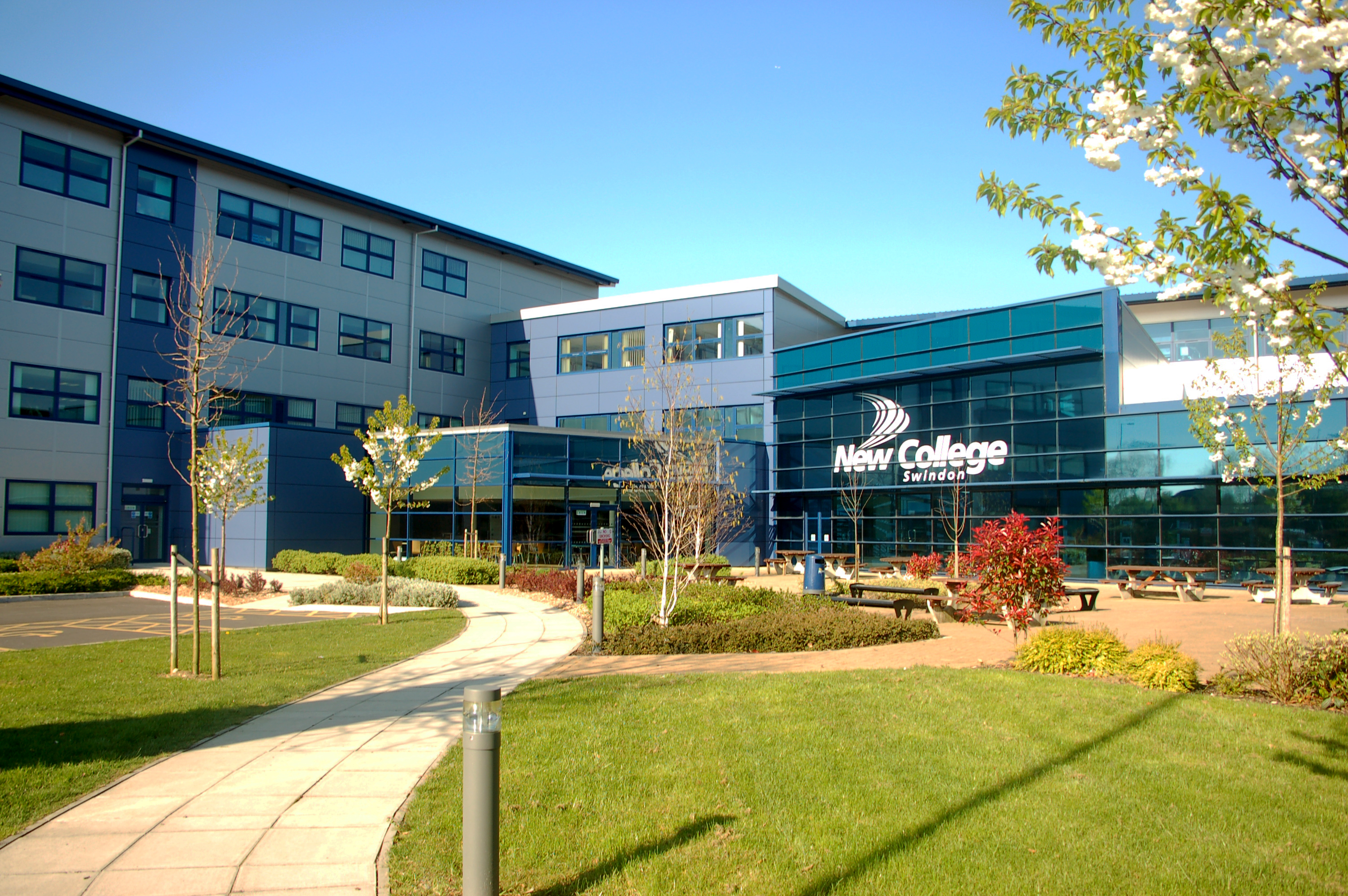
New College, Swindon

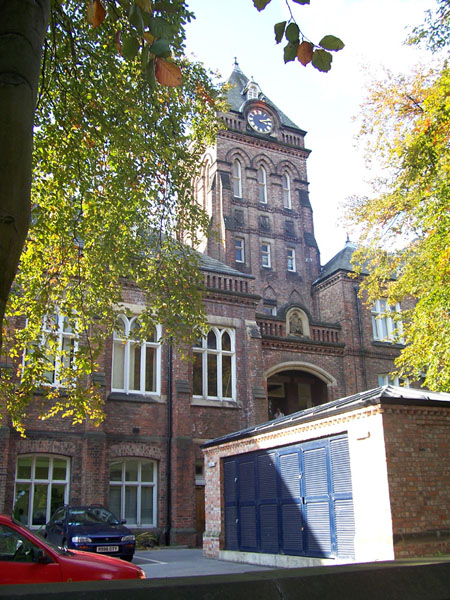
Queen Elizabeth Sixth Form College

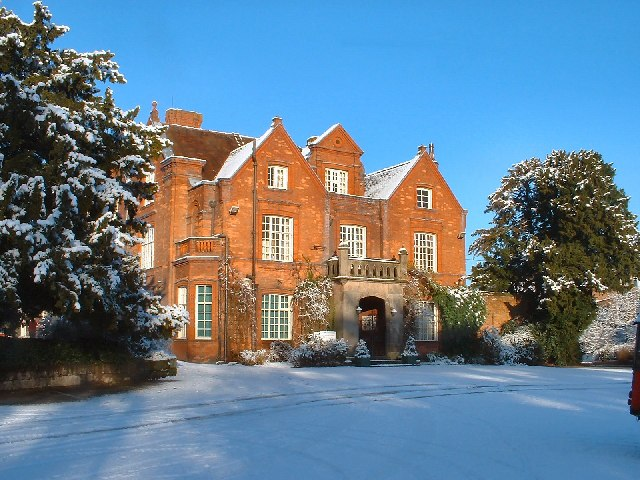
Reaseheath College

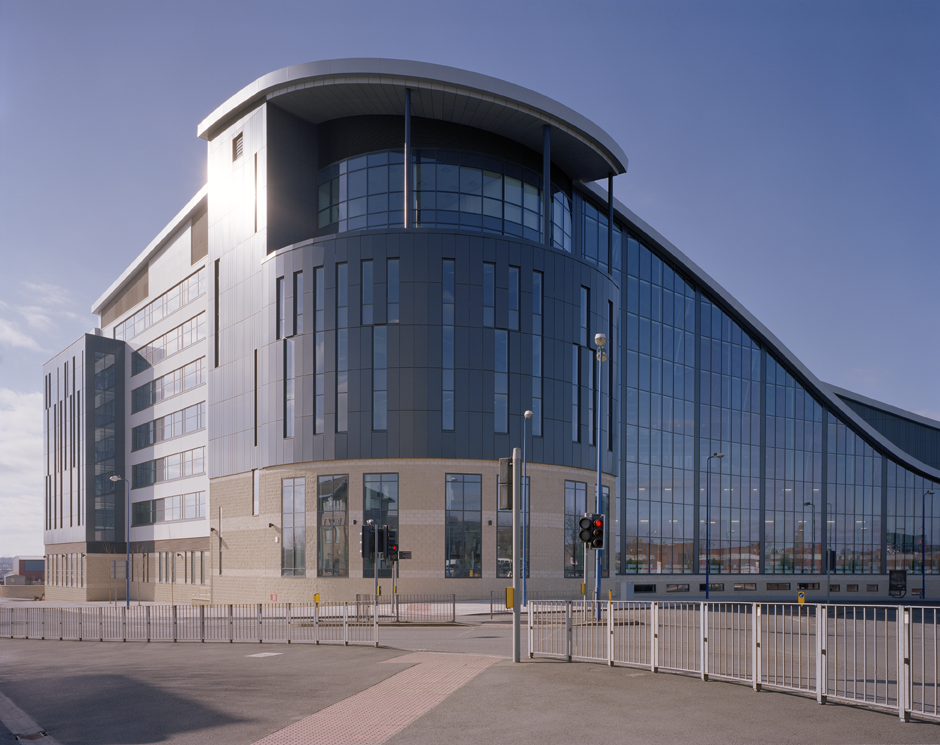
Sandwell College's Central Campus

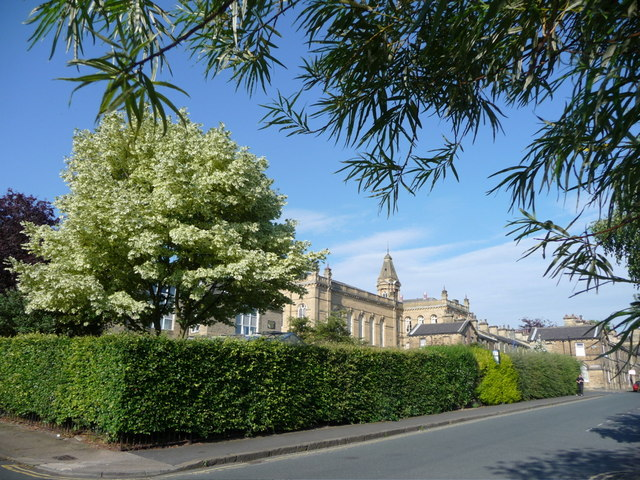
Shipley College

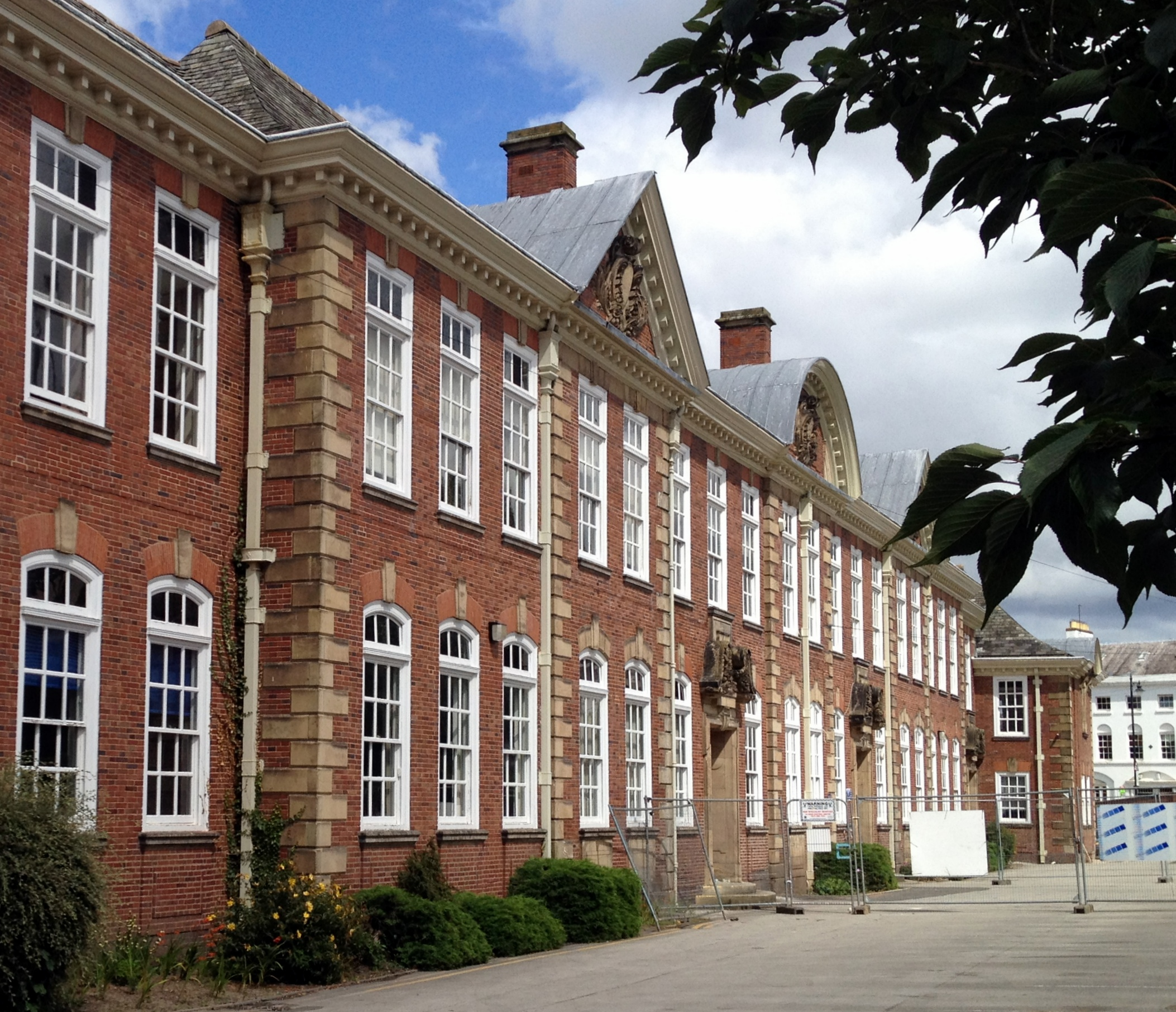
Shrewsbury Sixth Form College's listed Grade II Main Building

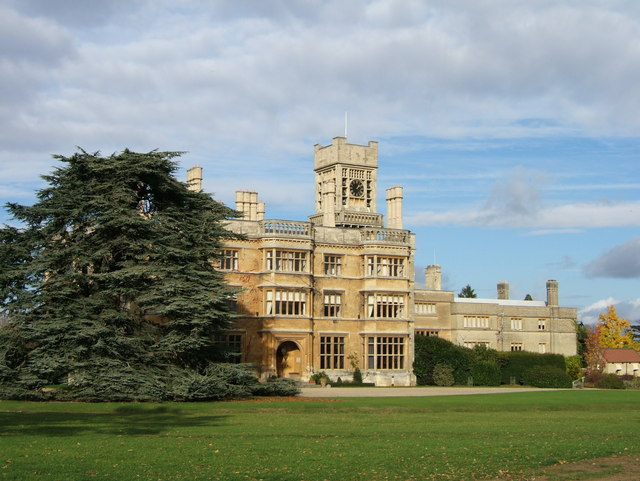
Shuttleworth College

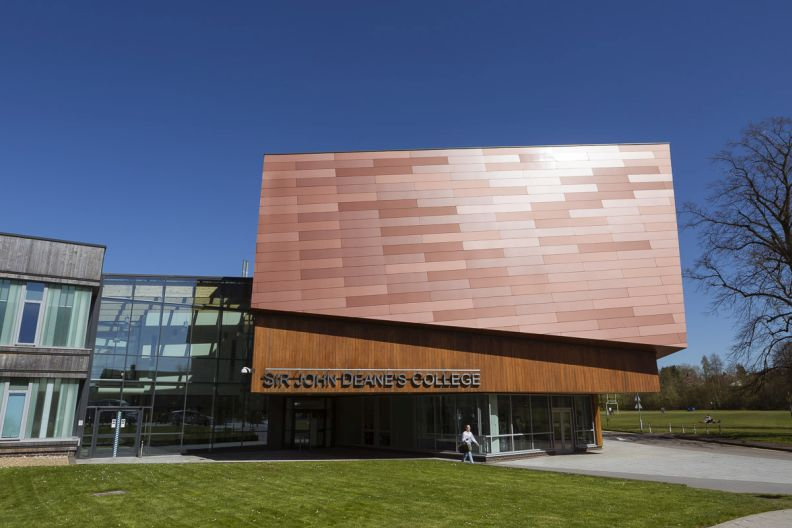
Sir John Deane's College's New College Building

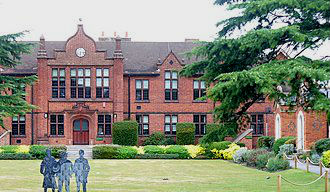
Strode's College

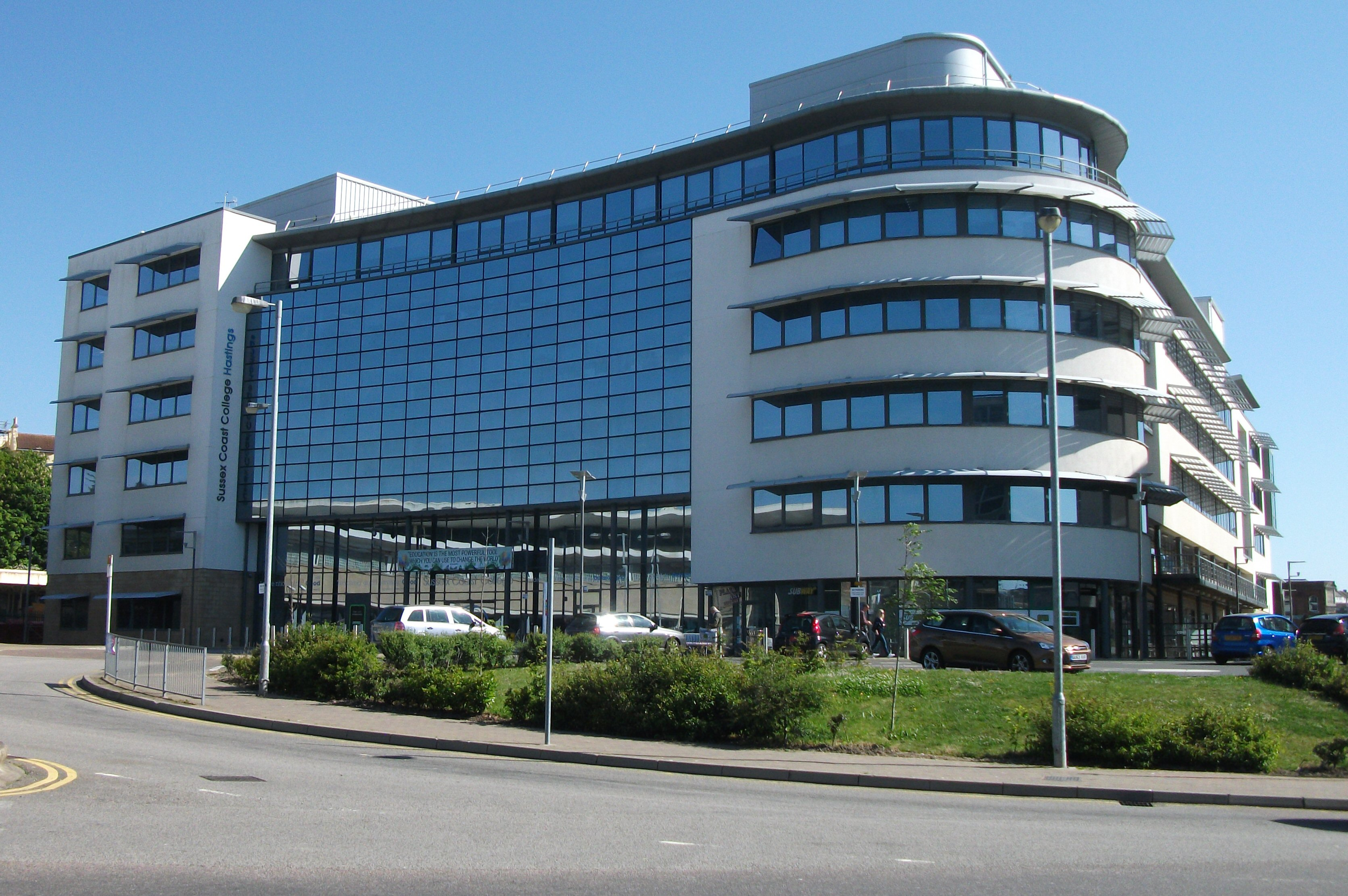
Sussex Coast College's Plaza Building

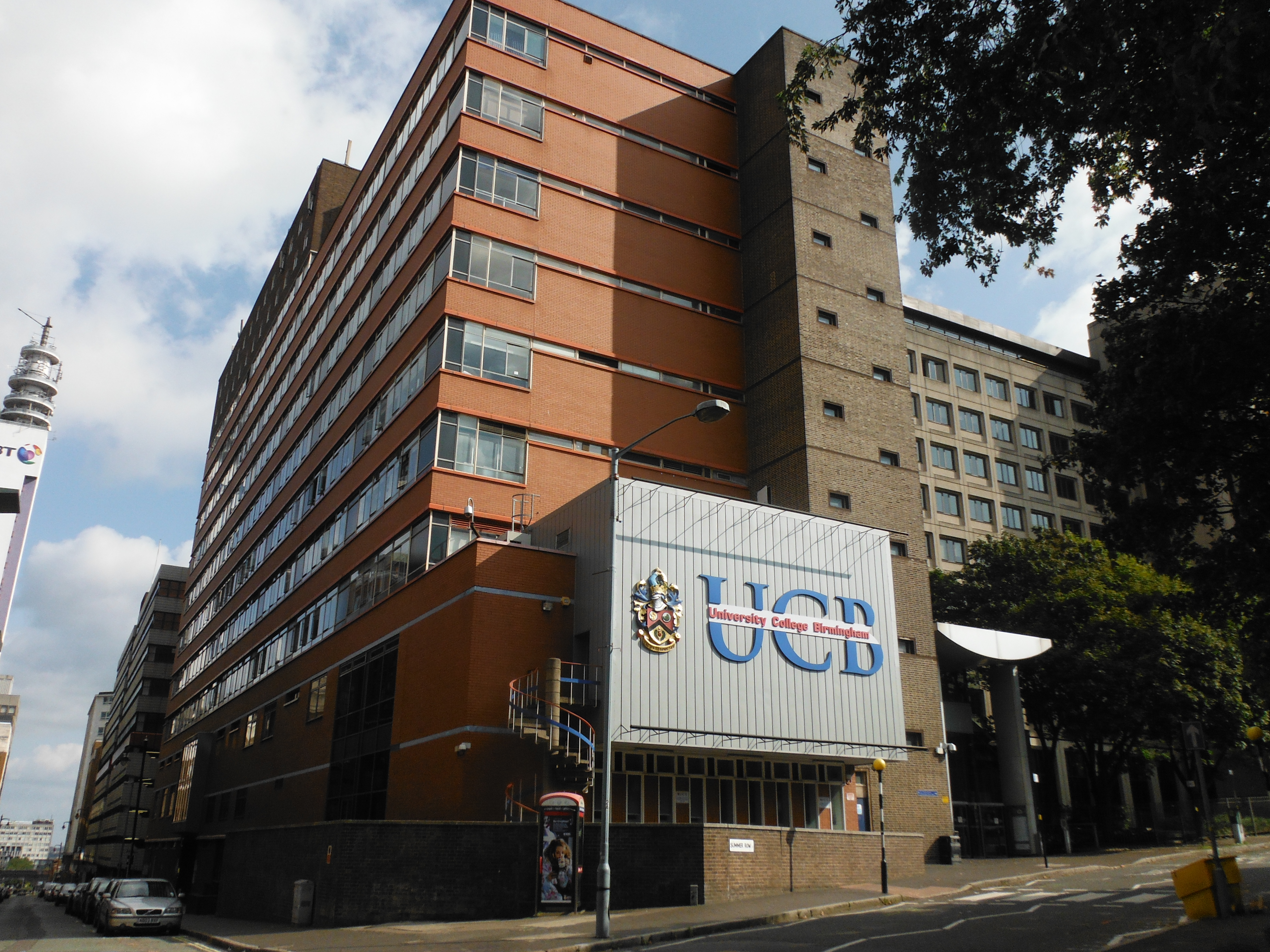
University College Birmingham

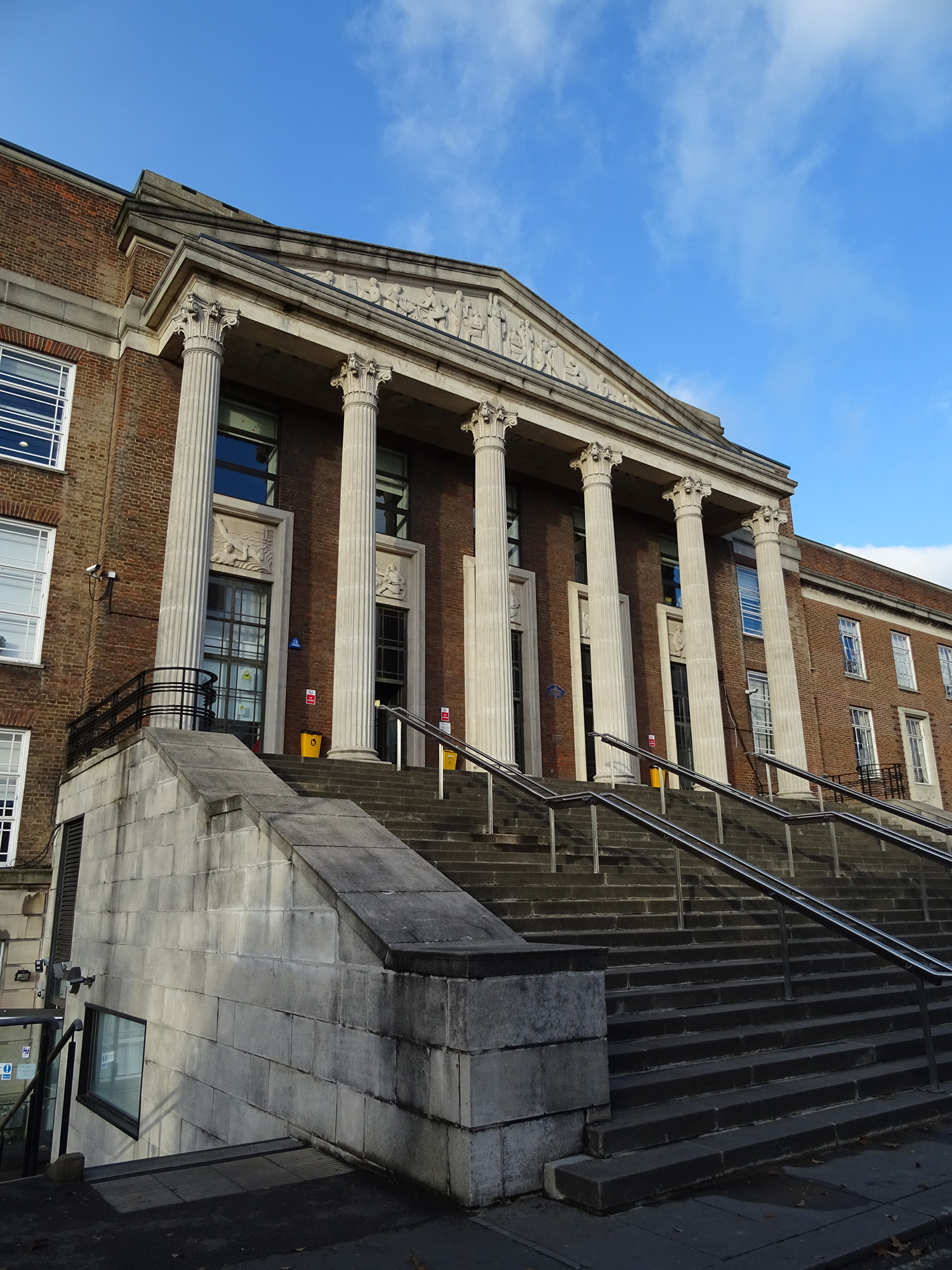
Waltham Forest College

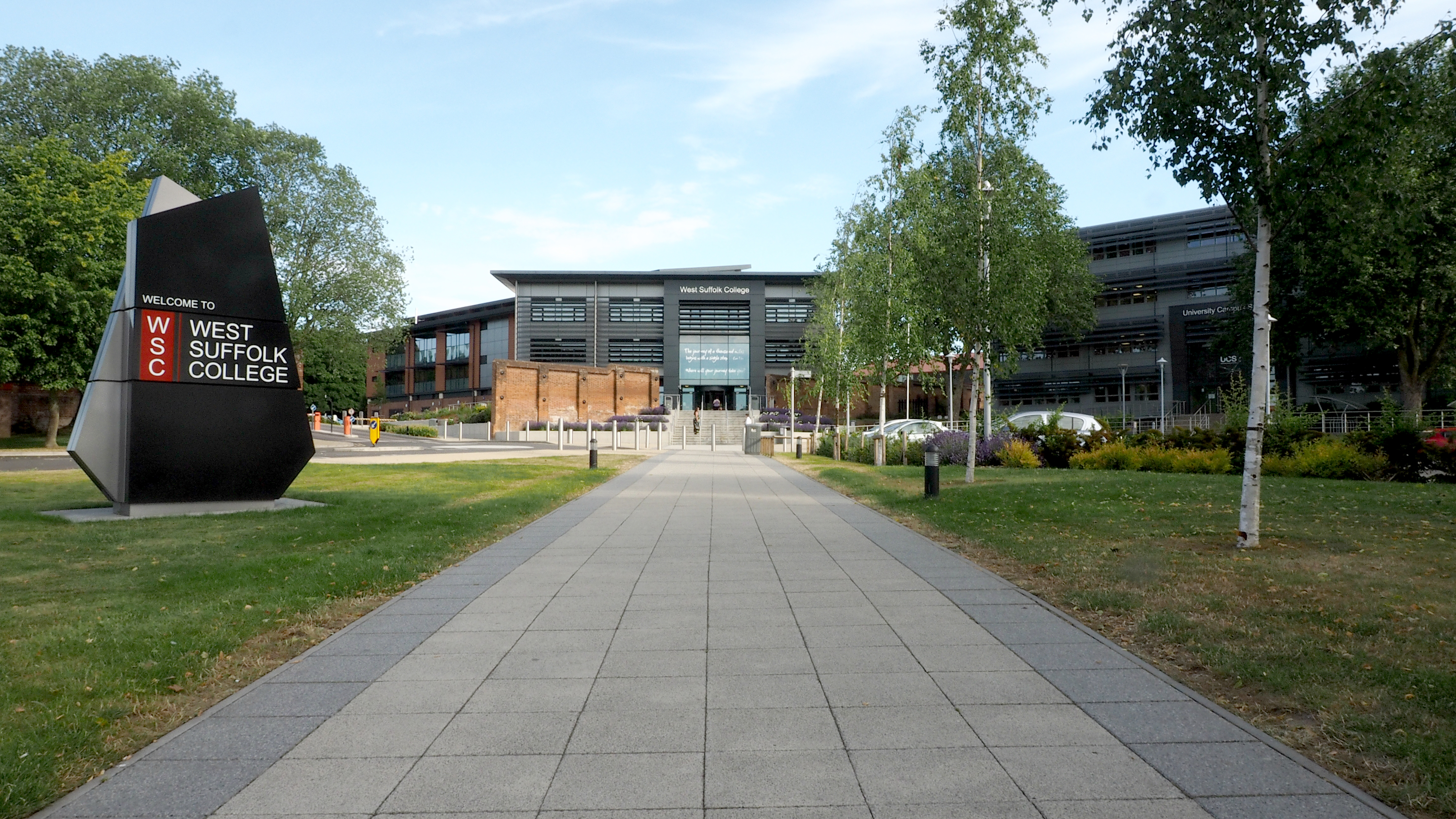
West Suffolk College

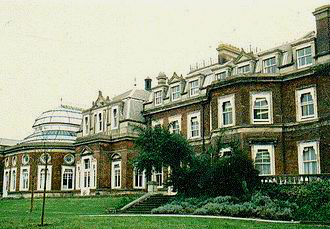
West Thames College's Spring Grove House

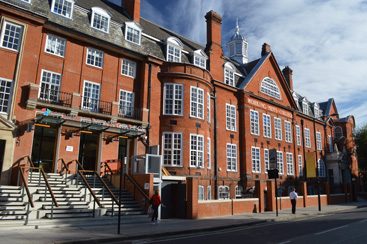
Working Men's College

Writtle University College's Main Building

== See also ==
- List of further education colleges in Northern Ireland
- List of further education colleges in Scotland
- List of further education colleges in Wales
