= Riverside College =

Riverside College may refer to:

- Riverside College, Widnes, further education college in the United Kingdom
- Riverside College (Philippines), medical college in the Philippines
- Riverside City College, public community college in Riverside, California, United States
