= List of further education colleges in Northern Ireland =

List of colleges

This is a list of current further education colleges in Northern Ireland, most of which provide both further education and higher education qualifications.

Further education colleges offer courses for people over the age of 14, involving school-level qualifications such as Higher Grade exams, as well as work-based learning and apprenticeships. Some of these colleges also offer undergraduate qualifications and post-graduate qualifications.

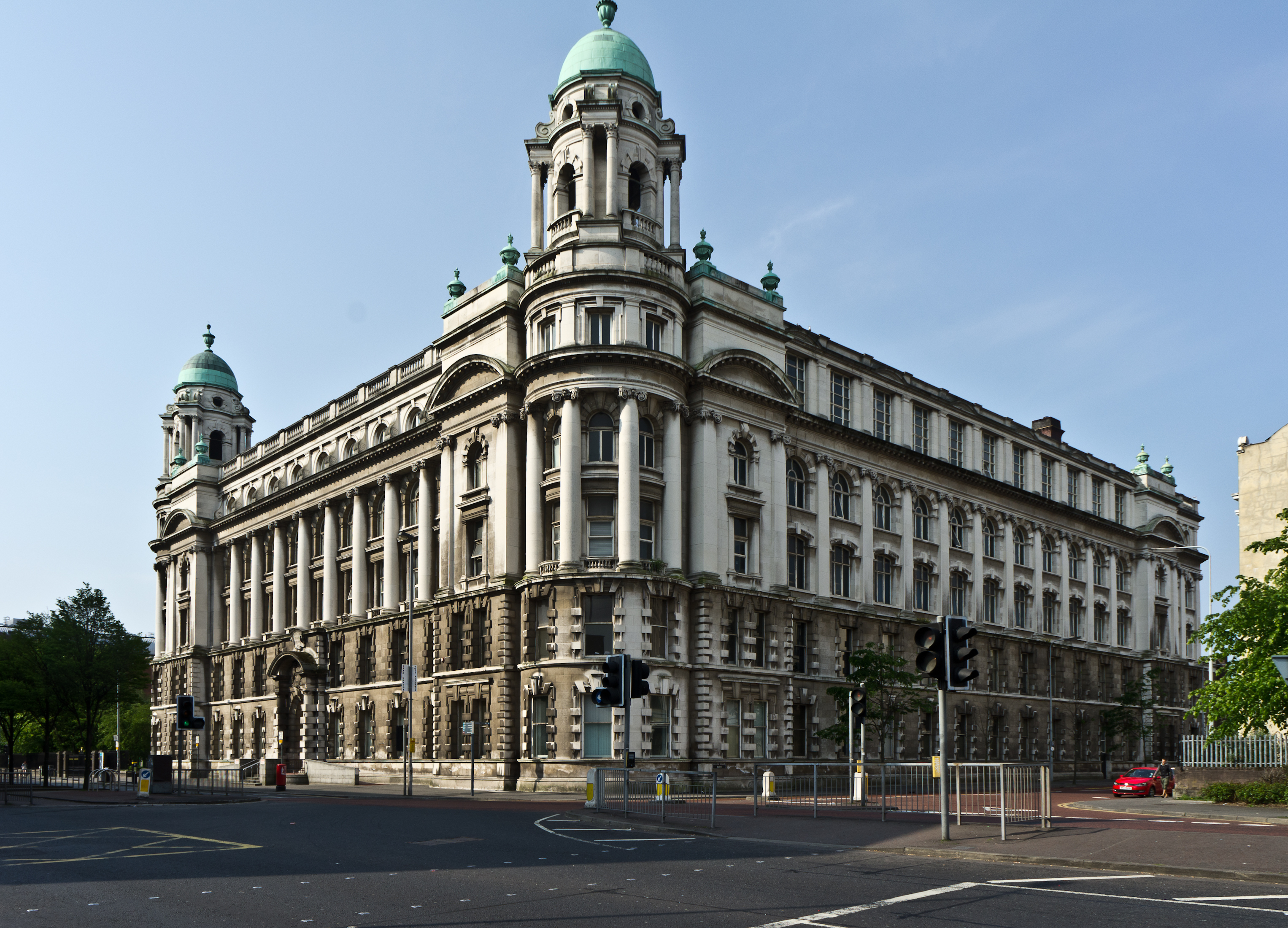
Belfast Metropolitan College's Municipal Technical Institute Building

Northern Irish colleges are funded the Department for the Economy (DfE).

- Belfast Metropolitan College
- College of Agriculture, Food & Rural Enterprise
- Northern Regional College
- North West Regional College
- South Eastern Regional College
- Southern Regional College
- South West College

== See also ==
- Education in Northern Ireland
- List of further education colleges in England
- List of further education colleges in Wales
- List of further education colleges in Scotland
