= Shipley College =

College in West Yorkshire, England

Coordinates: 53°50′13″N 1°47′18″W

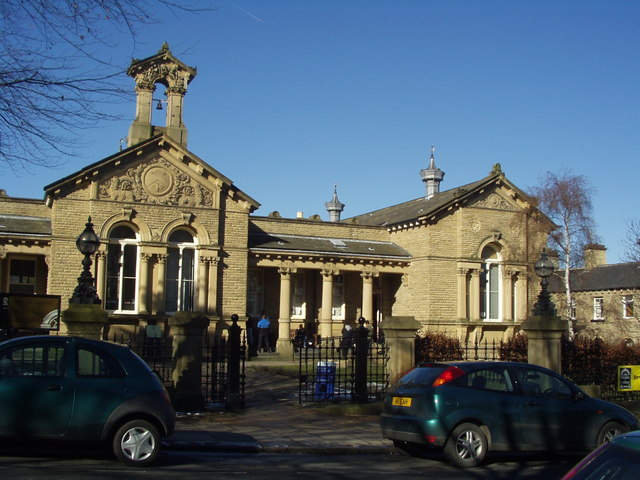
Shipley College

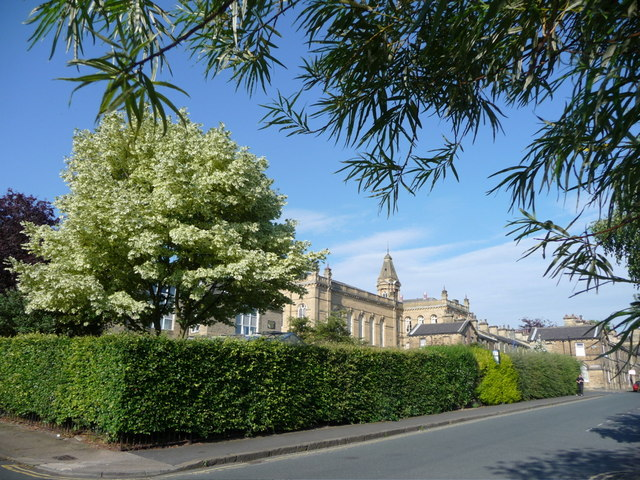
Shipley College and Victoria Hall, Saltaire

Shipley College is a General Further Education college in West Yorkshire, England, The college is a small place mainly based in the village of Saltaire. Other Sites are used for Lifestyle and Adult Learning and include local schools and Community Centres. Shipley College rents a number of the buildings in Saltaire from The Salt Foundation - these are the Salt Building, Mill building and Exhibition Building. Victoria Hall is also partly leased by the college. All buildings are within walking distance of each other. The College reception, Student Services and Enrolment office are based in the Salt Building.

== Courses offered ==
There are a wide range of courses offered at Shipley College, including BTEC's as full-time courses, Apprenticeships, part-time courses and Services to Business.

== See also ==
- Victoria Hall, Saltaire
