= Salisbury Sixth Form College =

Location
- 66-78 Tollgate Road; Salisbury, Wiltshire, SP1 2JJ; England; 51.0656°N 1.7857°W

Information
- Type: Free school sixth form
- Established: 1 September 2014
- Department for Education URN: 140621 Tables
- Ofsted: Reports
- Head of College: Ben Hillier
- Gender: Mixed
- Age: 16 to 19
- Enrolment: 330 (September 2023)
- Website: www.salisbury6c.ac.uk

Salisbury Sixth Form College (S6C) is a free school sixth form in the city of Salisbury in the English county of Wiltshire.

The college was established in 2014 and opened in temporary accommodation, before moving into a new purpose-built building on Tollgate Road in May 2016.

Salisbury Sixth Form College offers a range of A-levels as courses of study for students, as well as some BTECs and Cambridge Technicals. Facilities include an Achievement and Progress Centre for private study, purpose-designed science labs, a fitness suite, a fully equipped theatre, a dance studio with sprung flooring and a multi-use games area.

== Academic performance ==
In 2017, S6C was awarded a Good rating by Ofsted. The inspection report said that "Governors and college leaders have successfully created an ethos of tolerance, respect and high aspirations for learners" and that S6C has "quickly and effectively responded to the need for additional, local sixth-form provision for learners who have a wide range of academic achievement at the end of key stage 4.

In 2021–22, the average A-level result at the college was C+.
