= Capital City College Group =

Further education provider in London, England

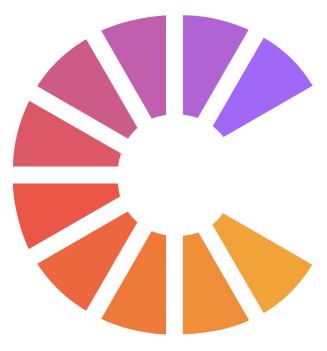
- London; England

Information
- Type: Further education
- Established: 2016
- President: The Lord Forbes of Newcastle CBE
- Board Chair: Michael Davis
- CEO: Angela Joyce
- Gender: Mixed
- Website: www.capitalccg.ac.uk

Capital City College Group (CCCG) is a further education provider in London, England. As of 2024, it was the largest college group in London. The Group was rated 'Good' by Ofsted in December 2022.

== Description ==
It operates the College of Haringey, Enfield and North East London, City and Islington College and Westminster Kingsway College. It has a combined enrolment of roughly 35,000 students.

It was created in August 2016 when Westminster Kingsway College and City and Islington College merged to become WKCIC Group. In November 2017, WKCIC Group merged with the College of Haringey, Enfield and North East London to create CCCG. In 2018, it had a budget of £110 million, and 1,700 staff across four sites.

CCCG offers courses in all 15 subject sector areas, with a focus on applied education, vocational specialisms and A levels.

As of 2024, CCCG's chairman is Michael Davis, and its CEO is Angela Joyce. The Lord Forbes of Newcastle CBE was appointed President in May 2026.
