= Redbridge Institute of Adult Education =

Redbridge Institute of Adult Education is the adult education service for the London Borough of Redbridge. It is largely funded through the Mayor Of London's Adult Education Budget and runs part-time qualification and non-qualification courses for adults.

Annually there are over 2500 leaners and 4500 enrolments who complete programs of study in ESOL, Skills for Life (English, Maths and Digital) and on vocational qualification courses. Redbridge Institute also offers specialist courses in Creative and Visual Arts including art, clothes making, jewellery, mosaics and glass fusing, pottery, stained glass and textiles.

Redbridge Institute runs courses throughout the London Borough of Redbridge, working with a variety of local community partners. Its main centres are in Gaysham Avenue in Gants Hill, The Mildmay Centre in Central Ilford, and Hainault Community Centre.
