= Westminster Kingsway College =

Coordinates: 51.5267°N 0.1192°W

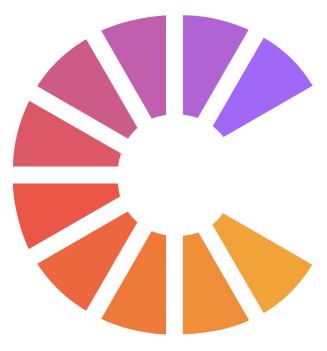

Location
- 211 Gray's Inn Road, King's Cross; Camden, London, WC1X 8RA; United Kingdom

Information
- Type: Further Education (FE) College
- Established: 1910–2000 – founding institutions 2000 – Westminster Kingsway College; 2016 – constituent college of Capital City College Group
- Local authority: London Borough of Camden, City of Westminster
- Ofsted: Reports
- CEO: Angela Joyce
- Gender: Mixed
- Age: 16+
- Website: https://www.capitalccg.ac.uk/westking

Westminster Kingsway College, rebranded in the 2020s to Capital City College Group, provides further, adult and higher education full-time and part-time courses, including vocational technical courses, A Levels, T Levels and professional and academic courses at different levels.

== History ==
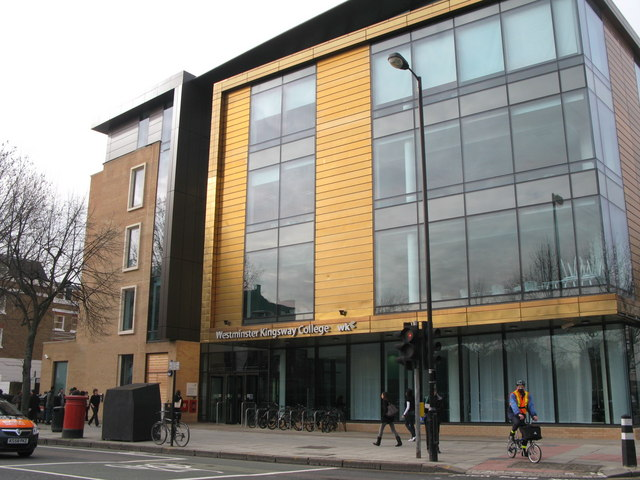
Westminster Kingsway College on Gray's Inn Road, Kings Cross, London.

The college was founded in September 2000 following the merger of Westminster and Kingsway Colleges. The Victoria Centre, where the School of Hospitality first opened its doors to learners in 1910, celebrated its centenary in 2010. Based in Vincent Square, the centre houses the college's own restaurant, The Vincent Rooms, with cuisine prepared and served by second and third year professional chef students.

The college provides community education, with a programme of neighbourhood learning in partnership with Camden Council and in Westminster with local organisations.

The college's specialist subjects have been given to vocational training including Hospitality, Creative Media, Performing Arts, Business and Public Administration. It also provides higher education for about 250 full-time equivalent students on foundation degrees in business, Hospitality Management, Culinary Arts, Travel & Tourism, Accounting and Public Administration.

Westminster College began as a School of Hospitality in Vincent Square in 1910 when in 1908 a consultative committee which included Sir Isidore Salmon, Auguste Escoffier and César Ritz was established to design training programmes in professional cookery in readiness to produce graduates that could work in London's finest hotels. The first course to be developed was the Cookery Technical Day School, which was soon to be formulated into the Professional Chef Diploma. Within a couple of years, the school had added food service to its course portfolio and a training restaurant was opened. Records show that this was in fact the UK's first Hospitality School established in 1910.

The school developed during the interwar years as additional kitchens, cold rooms and larder and pastry areas were added. A two-year hotel manager's course replaced the food service course. There were plans for a 50-bedroom 'training hotel', which had begun construction in 1939. This stopped as a result of the outbreak of World War II and was never completed.

Following the war, the Vincent Rooms restaurant was extended, and in 1953 the Escoffier Restaurant was opened. Further kitchens were added as well as a wine cellar. In 1985 there was a substantial and comprehensive refit of the whole school.

Before the merger, Kingsway College, previously known as Princeton College, was a large college in Camden. It received £55million for redevelopment in 2009. Notable principals included Fred Flower from 1960 to 1978. Regarded as one of the great humanist educators of his day, under Flower's leadership, Kingsway became one of the country's most diverse and thriving further education colleges, and his skill provided a framework for the development of unconventional ideas which came to powerfully influence British post-16 education. Flower sat on both the Newsom (1963) and the Taylor (1977) committees.

On 1 August 2016, Westminster Kingsway College merged with City and Islington College to form the WKCIC Group, trading as Capital City College Group, making the Group the largest further education and training provider in London.

== External assessment ==
=== QAA ===
The Quality Assurance Agency for Higher Education independently assessed the college in 2010. It concluded that: " ... the ... review team ... considers that there can be confidence in the college’s management of its responsibilities, as set out in its partnership agreements, for the standards of the awards it offers on behalf of its awarding bodies. ... also considers that there can be confidence in the college’s management of its responsibilities, as set out in its partnership agreements, for the quality of learning opportunities it offers. ... reliance can be placed on the accuracy and completeness of the information that the college is responsible for publishing about itself and the programmes it delivers."

== Notable alumni ==
- Clare Benedict – actor
- Michelle Collins – actress
- Eliza Doolittle – singer/songwriter
- Catherine Ennis – Organist
- Ainsley Harriott – chef
- Little Simz – rapper, singer, and actress
- John Lydon – Sex Pistols vocalist and later, singer with post-punk band Public Image Ltd
- Toby Mott – artist
- Trevor Nelson – DJ for Kiss FM, DJ with Soul II Soul and BBC Radio DJ
- Jamie Oliver – chef
- Timothy Spall – actor
- Gillian Taylforth – actress
- Sid Vicious – member of punk rock outfit formed with Marco Pirroni, The Flowers of Romance (British band) and later, Sex Pistols bassist
- Jah Wobble – bassist with post-punk band Public Image Ltd
- Antony Worrall Thompson – chef
- Sophie Wright – chef
