= City and Islington College =

Further education college in London, England

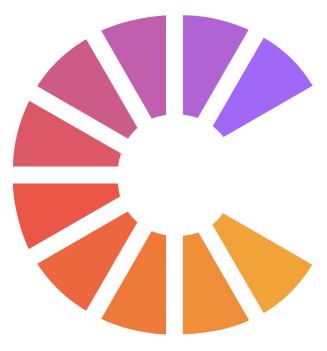

Location
- Islington, London; England
- Coordinates: 51°33′26″N 0°07′09″W

Information
- Type: Further Education College
- Established: 1993 – City and Islington College; 2016 – constituent college of Capital City College Group
- Local authority: London Borough of Islington
- Ofsted: Reports
- CEO: Angela Joyce
- Principal: Jasbir Sondhi
- Gender: Mixed
- Age: 16+
- Website: https://www.capitalccg.ac.uk/candi

City and Islington College (CANDI) has now been rebranded to Capital City College Group and provides further, adult and higher education full-time and part-time courses, including vocational technical courses, A Levels, T Levels and professional and academic courses at different levels.

== History ==
The college was formed in 1993 through a merger of the City and East London College, North London College, Islington Adult Education Service and Islington Sixth Form College, which operated over 13 sites across Islington, Hackney and Tower Hamlets.

In 2005 the college completed a £64 million building programme, which was the biggest investment in accommodation in the history of further education in the United Kingdom. Alongside the development of the new buildings, the management of teaching and learning was reorganised, and the five centres emerged.

On 1 August 2016, City and Islington College merged with Westminster Kingsway College to form the WKCIC Group, trading as Capital City College Group(CCCG). On 1 November 2017, the College of Haringey, Enfield and North East London joined CCCG, making the group the largest further education and training provider in London and one of the largest in the UK.

== Facilities ==
The college was once spread across 13 different sites and three boroughs, and some of the buildings dated back to the 19th century. There are now four centres in Islington, each one specialising in a particular set of subjects. The centres provide study and recreational spaces, all with the latest ICT equipment for teaching and learning.

The four centres are:

- Centre for Applied Sciences
- Centre for Business, Arts and Technology (including health, social and childcare)
- Centre for Lifelong Learning
- Sixth Form College

Each centre is focused on running particular courses and qualifications and each has its own community of students, teachers and support staff.

=== Centre for Applied Sciences ===
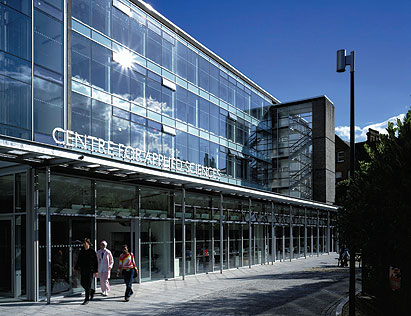
Centre for Applied Sciences

In Angel, Islington, the centre building was officially opened by her Majesty's Chief Inspector for Schools, David Bell, in May 2005, the same year that Ofsted rated the college's science provision as outstanding.

Applied science courses range from Introductory Diplomas to Foundation Degrees and lead to professions that require specialist scientific knowledge such as forensics, optics, medicine, nursing and sports and fitness training.

Many of the staff have industry experience and there are links with prestigious London universities as well as professional organisations such as the Metropolitan Police.

In 2008, the college's Science provision was rewarded yet again, winning the Queen's Anniversary Prize, thus becoming the first general further education College to win the award twice. It was won for 'Creating Pathways to Employment and Higher Education in the Sciences'.

=== Centre for Business, Arts and Technology ===
The new £15 million building on Camden Road, designed by Wilkinson Eyre Architects and built by William Verry with Sprunt Architects, was officially opened by the then Secretary of State for Education, Ruth Kelly, in January 2006. Subject areas include; ICT and Networking, Business and Management, Visual Arts, Performing Arts and Media from basic level through to Foundation Degree.

Health, social and childcare courses are also offered at this centre, following the closure of the Marlborough Building in 2020.

=== Centre for Lifelong Learning ===
In Blackstock Road, Finsbury Park, courses are offered for adults with learning difficulties and disabilities together with courses in beauty and complementary therapies.

The centre, designed by Wilkinson Eyre Architects, specialises in English for Speakers of Other Languages (ESOL) courses. Although most of the students are adults, a special ESOL programme for young people is also available. Courses range from beginner to advanced level and include Maths and IT. Beauty Therapy, Barbering and Hairdressing are also taught and make use of the on-site salon.

=== Sixth Form College ===
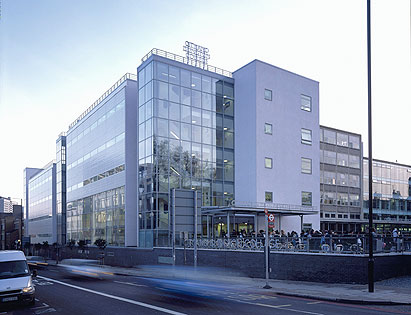
Sixth Form College

The Sixth Form College has a high standard of A-level results. As well as academic courses, students are involved in extra-curricular activities with an enrichment programme, as well as opportunities for trips abroad and the chance to work with professional organisations like the Almeida Theatre, or participation in the Duke of Edinburgh award.

Students are able to choose from over 30 A-level courses for 16- to 18-year-olds in the following subject areas: English, Media, Humanities, Business Studies, ICT, Languages, Maths, Performing Arts, Sciences, Visual Arts and Design.

Van Heyningen and Haward Architects won an architectural design competition managed by RIBA Competitions to design the building in 1999 and work was completed in 2003. The Sixth Form Centre is designed to be flexible, with clear and simple circulation reflected through a powerful facade.

== Notable alumni ==
- Barry Norman (born 1933), film critic
- David Oyelowo (born 1976), actor
- Tameka Empson (born 1977), actress
- Angel Coulby (born 1980), actress
- Reggie Yates (born 1983), actor/television presenter
- Paloma Faith (born 1981), singer-songwriter and actress
- Zawe Ashton (born 1984), actress
- Delilah (musician) (born 1990), singer-songwriter
- Kathryn Prescott (born 1991), actress
- Elijah Quashie (born 1993), food critic
- Desiree Henry (born 1995), athlete
- Ama Pipi (born 1995), athlete
