= Bracknell and Wokingham College =

College in England

Coordinates: 51.416°N 0.745°W

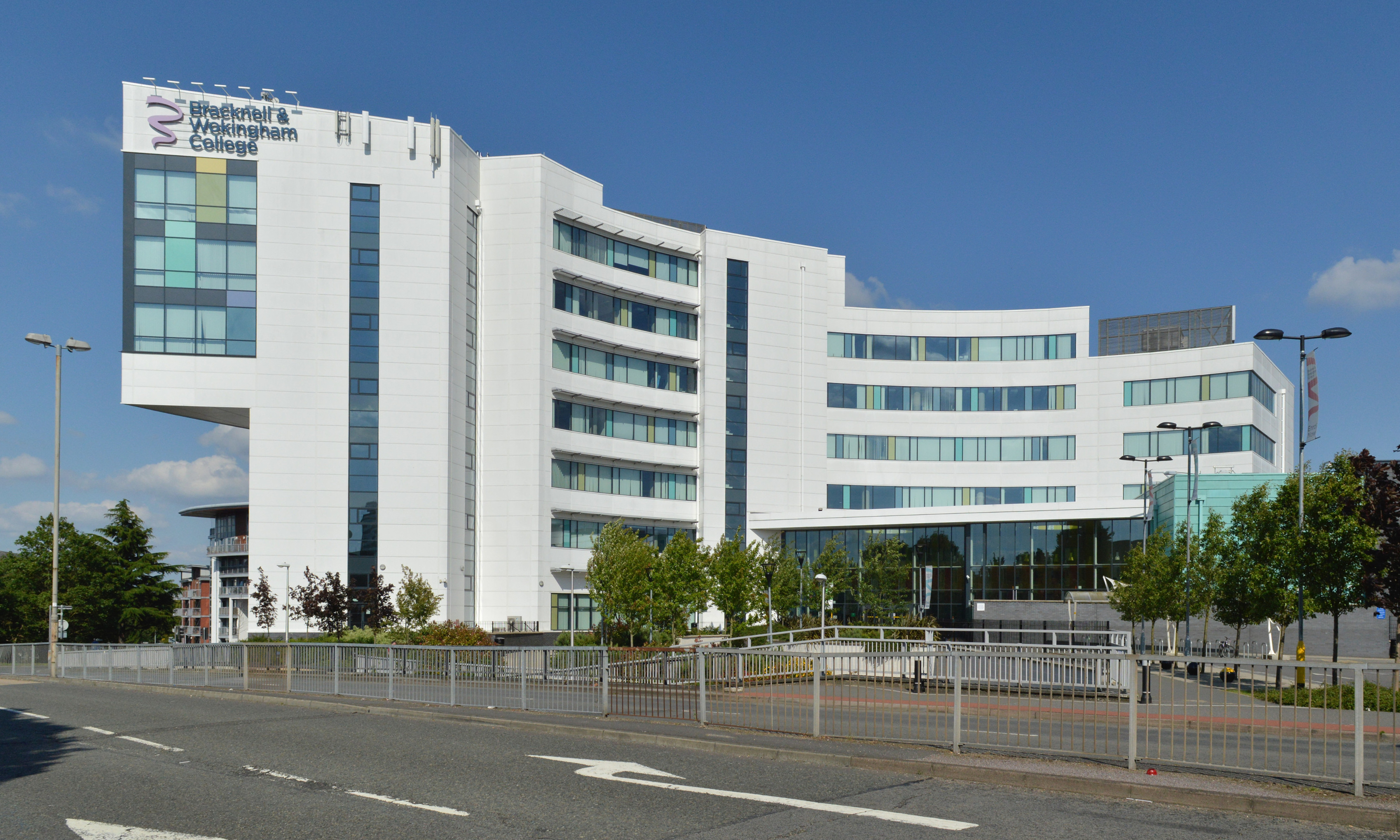
Bracknell and Wokingham College's Church Road centre

Bracknell & Wokingham College is a general college of further education, offering courses for school leavers, adults and employers training their staff, and based in Bracknell, Berkshire, England. The college became Bracknell & Wokingham College in 1996.

== Overview ==
Established in 1963, the college became Bracknell & Wokingham College in 1996 and today operates out of around 20 centres in the Bracknell Forest and Wokingham District areas. Its modern HQ in Church Road in Bracknell opened in 2009 and caters for students of all ages although it is more common that adult students take evening and weekend courses.

== Education ==
For school leavers, the college offers a range of A Levels, BTECs, Apprenticeships and many more vocational courses.

== Facilities ==
The college’s Church Road centre; a £36 million investment, was officially opened by Prince Edward, Earl of Wessex on 29 September 2010.
