= Riverside College, Widnes =

Riverside College

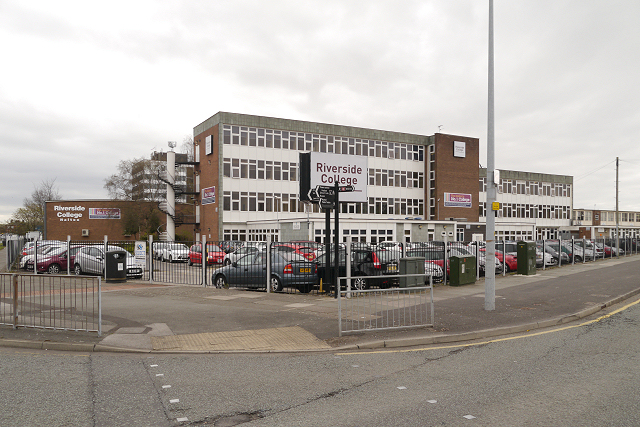
- The Riverside College campus

Location
- Kingsway; Widnes, Cheshire, WA8 7QQ; England; 53.3641°N 2.7349°W

Information
- Type: General Further Education College
- Established: 2006
- Department for Education URN: 130622 Tables
- Ofsted: Reports
- Principal: Mary Murphy
- Gender: Mixed
- Age: 16 to 18
- Campuses: Riverside; Cronton
- Website: riversidecollege.ac.uk

Riverside College (formerly known as Halton College) is a further education college based over two sites in Widnes, Cheshire, England. It was rated "Outstanding" by Ofsted following an inspection in 2020, and received its second “Outstanding” rating from Ofsted in 2024.

The college was established from the merger of Halton College and Widnes & Runcorn Sixth Form College in 2006. Today, Riverside College has two campuses in Widnes: one, the more academically focused Cronton Sixth Form College, situated on Cronton Lane in the north of the town; and the more vocationally focused Riverside Campus, situated on Kingsway nearer to the town centre.

The college provides a range of courses, including GCSEs, A Levels, BTECs, T Levels, Apprenticeships and Access courses. In addition, the college offers some higher education courses, in conjunction with Pearson Education and Staffordshire University.
