= Land based college =

UK colleges specializing in rural topics

In the United Kingdom, land-based colleges are colleges specialising in agriculture, horticulture, and other topics useful for rural economies. Most land-based colleges are members of Landex, which promotes and coordinates the colleges.

== List of rural colleges in the UK ==
=== England ===
- Askham Bryan College in Askham Bryan, North Yorkshire
- Berkshire College of Agriculture in Burchetts Green, Berkshire
- Bicton College in Budleigh Salterton, Devon
- Bishop Burton College in Bishop Burton, East Riding of Yorkshire
- Brooksby Melton College in Melton Mowbray, Leicestershire
- Capel Manor College in Bulls Cross, London Borough of Enfield
- College of West Anglia in Cambridgeshire
- Easton College in Norfolk
- Hadlow College in Hadlow, Kent
- Hartpury College in Hartpury, Gloucestershire
- Houghall College in Houghall, County Durham
- Kingston Maurward College in Dorchester, Dorset
- Merrist Wood College in Worplesdon, Surrey
- Moulton College in Moulton, Northamptonshire
- Myerscough College in Bilsborrow, Lancashire
- Newton Rigg College in Penrith, Cumbria, part of Askham Bryan College
- Plumpton College in Plumpton, East Sussex
- Reaseheath College in Nantwich, Cheshire
- Riseholme College in Lincolnshire
- Royal Agricultural College in Cirencester, Gloucestershire
- Shuttleworth College (Bedfordshire) in Old Warden
- Sparsholt College in Sparsholt, Hampshire
- South Staffordshire College specifically Rodbaston College based in Penkridge, Staffordshire
- Suffolk Rural College in Otley, Suffolk
- Walford Campus in Baschurch, Shropshire
- Warwickshire College, specifically Moreton Morrell College, Warwickshire, and Pershore College, Worcestershire
- Wiltshire College Lackham, near Chippenham
- Writtle University College in Chelmsford, Essex

=== Northern Ireland ===
- College of Agriculture, Food and Rural Enterprise

=== Scotland ===
- Scotland's Rural College

=== Wales ===
- Coleg Cambria Llysfasi in Ruthin, Denbighshire
- Glynllifon Agricultural College in Caernarfon, Gwynedd

== See also ==
- Land-grant university
