= Stephen Waite =

British academic

- Occupation: Academic

Stephen Waite is a British academic who was Vice-Chancellor of Writtle University College (near Chelmsford, Essex) one of the largest land-based university colleges in the UK. Waite lives in Hassocks with his wife and has two daughters.

Before he joined Writtle he was Vice Principal (Higher Education) at Hartpury College and Associate Dean at University of the West of England. Waite has been instrumental in a number of global joint education ventures with visits/projects in India, Malaysia, China and Vietnam. He has taught for the Mongolian National University and carried out project work in Ukraine.

He is a previous board director of Landex and a governor of Plumpton College. Waite is also a noted author in the field of ecology. (A Textbook of Agroecology – 2010)
