= Landex =

- Land Based Colleges Aspiring to Excellence
- Predecessor: National Association of Principal Agricultural Education Officers (Napaeo)
- Formation: 2006; 20 years ago
- Type: Membership organisation
- Headquarters: University of Northampton Innovation Centre, Green Street, Northampton, NN1 1SY
- Members: 39
- Chief Executive: Alex Payne
- Chair: Jeremy Kerswell
- Website: landex.org.uk

The Land Based Colleges Aspiring to Excellence (Landex) is a membership organisation for specialist land-based colleges and universities in the United Kingdom. Established in 2006, Landex is the successor of the National Association of Principal Agricultural Education Officers (Napaeo).

== Structure ==
The organisation was formed in 2006 from its predecessor, Napaeo, which was founded in 1950. Landex colleges and universities in England collectively provide over 80% of long specialist land-based further and higher education qualifications, together with a wide range of 14-16 apprenticeship and cost-recovery programmes. Courses delivered by most Landex providers are underpinned by substantial farming and other business enterprises. It is governed by a board of 14 elected principals and vice-chancellors, who agree the organisation's strategic objectives and priorities on behalf of the membership. A number of sub-committees, each chaired by a board member and populated by specialists from within the sector, inform the board's decision making:

- Higher Education
- Further Education Quality & Curriculum
- Finance & Funding
- Learning Materials & Technology.

The staff team is led by chief executive, Chris Moody. Its primary functions are to secure continuous improvement in all its members through peer review, support and CPD; and to promote the interests of members and their various client groups.

== Activities ==
The organisation's activities include:

- Engaging with a range of government departments and agencies to raise the profile and promote the importance of land based education and training.
- Working particularly closely with the funding agencies to ensure that the cost of meeting the specific needs of education and training for the land based industries is reflected in the various funding methodologies.
- Working with the quality assurance agencies to ensure that inspection and audit processes are as effective as possible in improving the quality of both teaching, learning and assessment, and student experience.
- Responding to a wide range of public consultations on behalf of its members.
- Working with industry leaders on the direction and content of the Agriskills Forum strategy “towards a new professionalism”, and continuing to participate actively in the work of this forum, and the various initiatives emanating from it.
- Building on the model of quality improvement Landex completes over 100 site visits to member Colleges annually, spanning well over 150 on-site days in order to provide structured analysis and guidance through peer review and the Landex model of quality improvement.
- Working in partnership with GuildHE and the AoC to ensure that the service it provides meets effectively the needs of specialist land based providers with respect to both further and higher education issues.
- Working closely with the Government officers responsible for policies on ‘Specialist Land based Providers and Weightings’, ‘Discretionary Learner Support Funding’, ‘Residential Bursaries’, and ‘Residential Care Standards Funding’. This provides the opportunity to reinforce the importance of appropriate support for students attending land based courses and to highlight how rurality issues affect students’ ability to participate in land based education and training.
- Providing an extensive range of continuous professional development (CPD) events and conferences each year, often at Landex colleges or universities, and involving a wide range of delegates from Landex member institutions and other providers of specialist land based programmes.
- Providing through its annual conference, the opportunity for members to meet and share good practice, and for national leaders to share emerging policy issues with members.

Landex owns with the University of Northampton, a joint venture company to develop interactive learning materials to support the delivery of land-based programmes both in the UK and overseas.

Between 2014 and 2016, Landex sponsored and funded the development of a National Land Based College as an organisation to help co-ordinate the delivery of continuous professional development for those working in land-based industries.

== Members ==
=== England ===
- Abingdon and Witney College, Common Leys Farm Campus
- Askham Bryan College
- Berkshire College of Agriculture (part of the Windsor Forest Colleges Group)
- Bicton College (part of The Cornwall College Group)
- Bishop Burton College
- Bridgwater and Taunton College
- Brooksby Melton College
- Chichester College
- Capel Manor College
- College of West Anglia
- Craven College
- Derby College
- Duchy College Rural Business School, Duchy College Rosewarne Campus, Duchy College Stoke Climsland Campus and Duchy College Eden Project Campus (part of The Cornwall College Group)
- East Durham College
- Easton College
- Falmouth Marine School (part of The Cornwall College Group)
- Guildford College
- Hadlow College
- Harper Adams University
- Hartpury College
- Herefordshire and Ludlow College
- Kingston Maurward College
- Moulton College
- Myerscough College
- North Shropshire College
- Northumberland College (Kirkley Hall)
- Nottingham Trent University (Brackenhurst)
- Plumpton College
- Reaseheath College & University Centre
- Riseholme College (part of Bishop Burton College)
- Royal Agricultural University, Cirencester
- Shuttleworth College (part of the Bedford College Group)
- Sparsholt College
- University of Lincoln
- WCG, Moreton Morrell and Pershore College
- Wiltshire College & University Centre (Lackham campus)
- Writtle College

=== Northern Ireland ===
- College of Agriculture, Food and Rural Enterprise, Greenmount Campus, Enniskillen Campus and Loughry Campus

=== Scotland ===
- Scotland's Rural College, Aberdeen campus, Ayr campus, Barony campus, Edinburgh campus, Elmwood campus and Oatridge campus

=== Wales ===
- Coleg Cambria Llysfasi (part of Coleg Cambria)

== Affiliate members ==
- Oaklands College
- Solihull College
