= Kingston Maurward =

Kingston Maurward may refer to:

- Kingston Maurward, Dorset, a town in Dorset, U.K.
- Kingston Maurward House, a Grade I listed Georgian English country house in Dorset, U.K.
- Kingston Maurward College, Dorchester, Dorset, U.K.
