= Fawn Weaver =

American entrepreneur and author

- Born: Fawn Evette Wilson; September 5, 1976 (age 50)
- Occupations: Author, CEO
- Notable work: Uncle Nearest Premium Whiskey
- Spouse: Keith Weaver (m. 2003)
- Father: Frank Wilson

Fawn Evette Weaver (née Wilson; born September 5, 1976) is an American entrepreneur and author who held the position of CEO at Grant Sidney Inc. In 2017, Weaver co-founded Uncle Nearest Premium Whiskey where she was CEO until June 2026. She is the founder of the Nearest Green Foundation. In March 2021, she was named to Endeavor's board of directors. In July 2026, court filings revealed that Fawn Weaver and her husband, Keith Weaver, were fired from Uncle Nearest for defaulting on over $100 million in loans, with total combined liabilities estimated near $200 million.

== Early years ==
Fawn Weaver grew up in Pasadena as the daughter of Frank and Philomina Wilson. Her father, a Motown recording artist, changed career to become a Christian minister in around 1975. At a young age, Weaver was introduced to Motown stars like Stevie Wonder and Smokey Robinson, they became a part of her father's ministry rather than because her father was a renowned writer and producer.

She left home at 15, staying with school friends in Jordan Downs, the Watts projects, for a short period. Later, she resided in three different homeless shelters, with Covenant House in Hollywood being her final stop.

Before turning 19, Weaver established her first company, FEW Entertainment, specializing in PR and special events. Early on, she secured two corporate clients, enabling the business to grow.

== Career ==
=== Uncle Nearest Premium Whiskey ===
In 2016, Weaver went to Tennessee to interview Nearest Green's descendants, including Victoria Eady Butler, for a book project. Weaver's work helped reveal the history of Jack Daniel Distillery included Nearest Green as its first master distiller and mentor to a young Jack Daniel, inspiring her to found and launch the Nearest Green Distillery and the Uncle Nearest Premium Whiskey brand in 2017. This made Weaver the first African-American woman to head a major spirits brand, and also the first American spirit brand with an all-female executive team. In 2019, was the first African-American featured on the cover of American Whiskey magazine.

By 2018, the brand had expanded to 12 countries, and is now the best-selling African-American owned spirit ever. In September 2019, Uncle Nearest opened its first distillery, set on a 270-acre ranch in Shelbyville, Tennessee.

Weaver was named one of Food & Wine's Drinks Innovators of the Year in 2022, alongside Uncle Nearest master blender Victoria Eady Butler.

Before establishing the distillery, Weaver also founded the Nearest Green Foundation, which honors the legacy of Green with a scholarship program, a museum, a memorial park, Uncle Nearest Premium Whiskey and a book. The foundation also provides full college scholarships for any of Green's descendants to attend the school of their choice. She also helped create the Nearest & Jack Advancement Initiative, a joint venture between the foundation and Jack Daniel's. It includes the Nearest Green School of Distilling certification program at Motlow State Community College, a Leadership Acceleration Program that offers apprenticeships to African-Americans, and a business incubation program for black micro distillers.

In 2020, Weaver started the Black Business Booster program, to help ten Black-owned spirits companies with branding, distribution, and capital. In June 2021, Weaver and Uncle Nearest formed the $50 million Uncle Nearest Venture Fund to invest in minority-owned spirits companies.

In 2026, Uncle Nearest remained under federal court-appointed receivership following litigation with its primary lender. In July 2026, court filings disclosed that founder and CEO Fawn Weaver and co-founder Keith Weaver had been terminated from their positions by the receiver, effective June 1. The receiver stated that the decision reduced operational confusion among employees and vendors while the company pursued restructuring and a potential sale. Weaver has disputed aspects of the receivership and related legal proceedings. In mid-2026, Weaver disappeared from social media amid backlash from her prior posts stating Uncle Nearest was healthy and the receivership was “over”. Weaver stated her reason for leaving social media was to write a book, while many have responded to this update as a cash grab and attempt to control the narrative outside of court filings.

=== Other work ===
Fawn's career began in 1994, when she formed special events and public relations company FEW Entertainment. She worked as a restaurant and real estate executive through the early 2000s, before founding Grant Sidney Inc. in March 2010.

Weaver's first book, Happy Wives Club: One Woman's Worldwide Search for the Secrets of a Great Marriage was published in 2014 by Thomas Nelson, and debuted at No. 3 on the New York Times Nonfiction Paperback list. In 2015, she wrote The Argument-Free Marriage: 28 Days to Creating the Marriage You've Always Wanted with the Spouse You Already Have, which offers a 28-day plan for marital happiness using conflict management.

Weaver was named one of Time's "31 People Changing the South" in 2018.

She was also an executive board member of Meet Each Need with Dignity and Slavery No More from January 2014 to December 2019. In March 2021, she was named to Endeavor's board of directors.

In 2024, Weaver was awarded the Distinguished Patriotic Award from the Veterans of Foreign Wars.

On July 9, 2025, Weaver became an honorary member of Delta Sigma Theta sorority.

== Personal life ==
Born in 1976 as Fawn Evette Wilson, she is the daughter of Motown Records songwriter and producer Frank Wilson. She has been married to Keith Weaver since 2003.

== Legal issues ==
=== 2025 lawsuit by Farm Credit Mid-America ===
In July 2025, Farm Credit Mid-America filed a US$108 million federal lawsuit against Uncle Nearest, Inc., Nearest Green Distillery, Inc., Uncle Nearest Real Estate Holdings, LLC, and co-founders Fawn and Keith Weaver, alleging defaults on multiple loans, misuse of loan proceeds, inflated collateral reporting, and failure to maintain financial covenants. The lawsuit sought the appointment of a court-appointed receiver to protect the lender's collateral which was granted. In May 2026, the court expanded the receivership to include founder Fawn Weaver's holding company, finding that a 20 million dollar loan from Jay‑Z's investment vehicle had been routed through Weaver's holding company and misrepresented to Farm Credit as the Weaver's own funds, which the judge said met the standard for fraudulent conduct. On June 1, 2026, the court appointed receivership announced that a buyer for Uncle Nearest Inc and Nearest Green Distillery had been found and would be announced publicly after the deal was finalized.The court-appointed receiver fired Weaver and her husband and co-founder, Keith Weaver, on June 1. The firings were disclosed on July 10 in a federal court filing obtained by The Tennessean.
