= Moat Farm Meadows =

Scientific site in Suffolk, England

Coordinates: 52.161°N 1.246°E

- Site of Special Scientific Interest
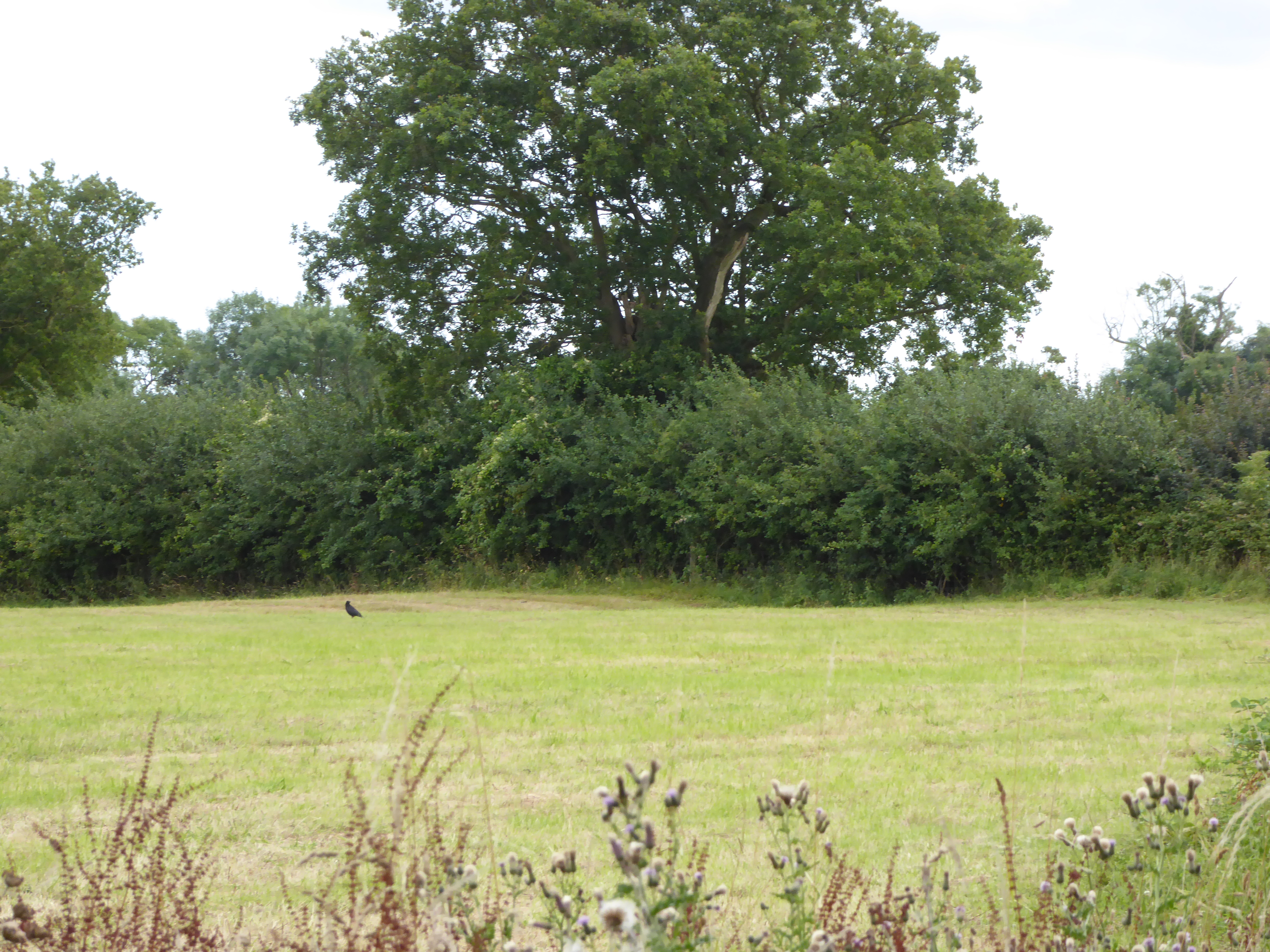
- Location of Moat Farm Meadows.
- Area of search: Suffolk
- Grid reference: TM 221 564
- Interest: Biological
- Area: 3.3 hectares
- Notification date: 1987
- Location map: Magic Map

Moat Farm Meadows is a 3.3-hectare (8.2-acre) biological Site of Special Scientific Interest north-east of Otley in Suffolk.

These calcareous meadows are traditionally cut for hay. They have diverse flora, with many green-winged orchids and one of the largest populations in the county of meadow saffron. Other species include ox-eye daisy and cuckoo flower.

The site is private land with no public access.
