= Joe Maiden =

British gardener (1941-2015)

- Born: 1941; Penrith, Cumbria, England
- Died: 17 September 2015 (aged 73–74)
- Presenting career
- Show: Gardening on Sunday with Tim Crowther & Joe Maiden
- Station: BBC Radio Leeds
- Time slot: 09:00 - 12:00 (Sunday)
- Country: United Kingdom

Joe Maiden (1941 – 17 September 2015) was a gardener, horticulturist, author and BBC Radio presenter based in Huby, Yorkshire, England.

== Career ==
Maiden was brought up in Penrith, Cumbria, and was educated at Askham Bryan College.

A professional horticulturist over a period spanning 40 years, he appeared on numerous gardening programmes for the BBC and Yorkshire Television and was awarded the Harlow Carr medal by The Royal Horticultural Society for his growing, lecturing and exhibitions of vegetables. Maiden's work has been published in a number of audio visual presentations He was a Fellow of the National Vegetable Society, and served on the society's judging panel. He was a committee member of the Leeds Horticultural Society.

Alongside the long-standing BBC Radio Leeds presenter Tim Crowther, Maiden regularly presented to Sunday morning audiences to the station's weekly peak audience.

He died on 17 September 2015 at the age of 74 of prostate cancer.

== Bibliography ==
Title	Year	Ref.ID.	Notes
Grow with Joe (Hardback)	2010	ISBN 978-1-905080-79-3	Great Northern Books
Grow With Joe: The Kitchen Garden (VHS)		ASIN: B00004CQD5	Beckmann Visual Publishing
Grow With Joe: Complete Garden Skills (VHS)		ASIN: B004OAFJ1C	Beckmann Visual Publishing
Grow With Joe: The Complete Flower Garden (VHS)	1995	ASIN: B00004CQI1	Beckmann Visual Publishing
