= Helen Mulholland =

Whiskey master blender

- Born: Portstewart, Northern Ireland
- Education: College of Agriculture, Food and Rural Enterprise; University of Reading
- Occupation: Master blender
- Employer: Sazerac Ireland
- Organisation: Irish Whiskey Association

Helen Mulholland is a Northern Irish whiskey distiller and master blender. She is the first woman master blender in Irish whiskey history and the current chair of the Irish Whiskey Association.

== Early life and education ==
Mulholland was born in Portstewart, Northern Ireland. She describes being brought up in a practically "dry" household, as her parents never drank alcohol; it was only in the house for visitors. She received a degree in food technology from the College of Agriculture, Food and Rural Enterprise followed by a masters degree, also in food technology, from the University of Reading.

== Career ==
Mulholland started working at Bushmills Distillery as a student placement. She worked as a lab technician before becoming their master blender in 2005, the first female to hold the position in Ireland. She was part of the team at Bushmills that discovered crystalised malt, which enhances the natural sweetness of a whiskey. Mulholland later used the crystal malt to create the Bushmills 1608, which won "Best Irish Blended Whisky" from the World Whisky Awards in 2008. She also has been personally involved in the selection of the wooden barrels used to store the whiskey, given the contribution of the barrel to the final taste of the product.

Mulholland moved from Bushmills to Sazerac Ireland, serving as master blender in the town of Sligo. She became vice-chair of the Irish Whiskey Association in 2022, and in 2024 became the Chair, the first woman to do so. She is also a member of the Last Drop Distillers' Assembly, an international whiskey organisation.

== Awards and honors ==
- In 2018, named to Whisky Magazine's Hall of Fame, the first woman to receive this honour
- In 2020, received the Drinks Ireland-Irish Whiskey Association Chairman's Award for her "outstanding contribution to the development of Irish whiskey", the first woman to receive this award
