= Victoria Eady Butler =

American law enforcement officer and master blender

- Born: Lynchburg, Tennessee
- Education: Middle Tennessee State University (B.S.)
- Occupations: Master Blender; law enforcement officer; nonprofit executive
- Organization(s): Master Blender, Uncle Nearest Premium Whiskey
- Family: Nearest Green (great-great-grandfather)
- Awards: Whisky Magazine Master Blender of the Year (2021 and 2022); Imbibe Magazine 75 People To Watch

Victoria Eady Butler is an American former law enforcement officer, nonprofit executive, and Master Blender who is the first Black woman to be recognized as a Master Blender, serving as the Master Blender of Uncle Nearest Premium Whiskey. She is the great-great-granddaughter of Nearest Green, and also oversees the Nearest Green Foundation, which supports her fellow descendants of Nearest Green with scholarships.

== Biography ==
Butler was raised in Lynchburg, Tennessee by her grandmother and aunt: her mother and most of her siblings lived in nearby Tullahoma, Tennessee. She was the first African-American homecoming queen at her school. She decided to study criminal justice at Middle Tennessee State University, and went on to spend 31 years working at the Department of Justice, where she was an analytical manager for the Regional Organized Crime Information Center in Nashville.

She met Fawn Weaver after she came to Tennessee to write a book about Green. When Weaver launched Uncle Nearest Premium Whiskey, Butler soon decided to join, and became the Vice President of Administration at the company, where she oversees human resources and the Nearest Green Foundation, which grants scholarships to her fellow descendants of Nearest Green.

She created a blend of whiskey during her time as vice-president of administration. Despite initial nerves, she soon grew confident in her blending. The completed blend rapidly sold out and won numerous awards, including two double-golds in international competitions. After she'd created three blends, in the opinion of Weaver each better than the last, Weaver decided to move her to the position of Master Blender, where she became the first African-American woman to be a Master Blender. She still also serves as head of the Nearest Green Foundation as well. During this time, she studied at Moonshine University's Stave and Thief Society to become a Certified Bourbon Steward.

She has spoken about how she believes whiskey is "in her blood", citing her rapid success, and attributes much of her success to Green.

She was named as one of the Imbibe Magazine 75 People to Watch. She was co-named Drinks Innovator of the Year, together with Weaver, by Food & Wine in 2022. She was named Master Blender of the Year by Whisky Magazine in 2021 and again in 2022, making her the first woman to win Master Blender of the Year and the first person to win Master Blender of the Year twice in a row. As of July 2026, she remained in the role despite Weaver's ousting due to financial issues and the company's transition to a court-ordered receivership.
