= Abingdon and Witney College =

Abingdon & Witney College
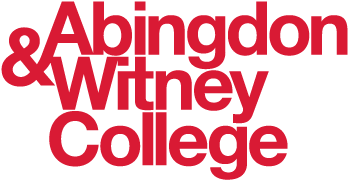

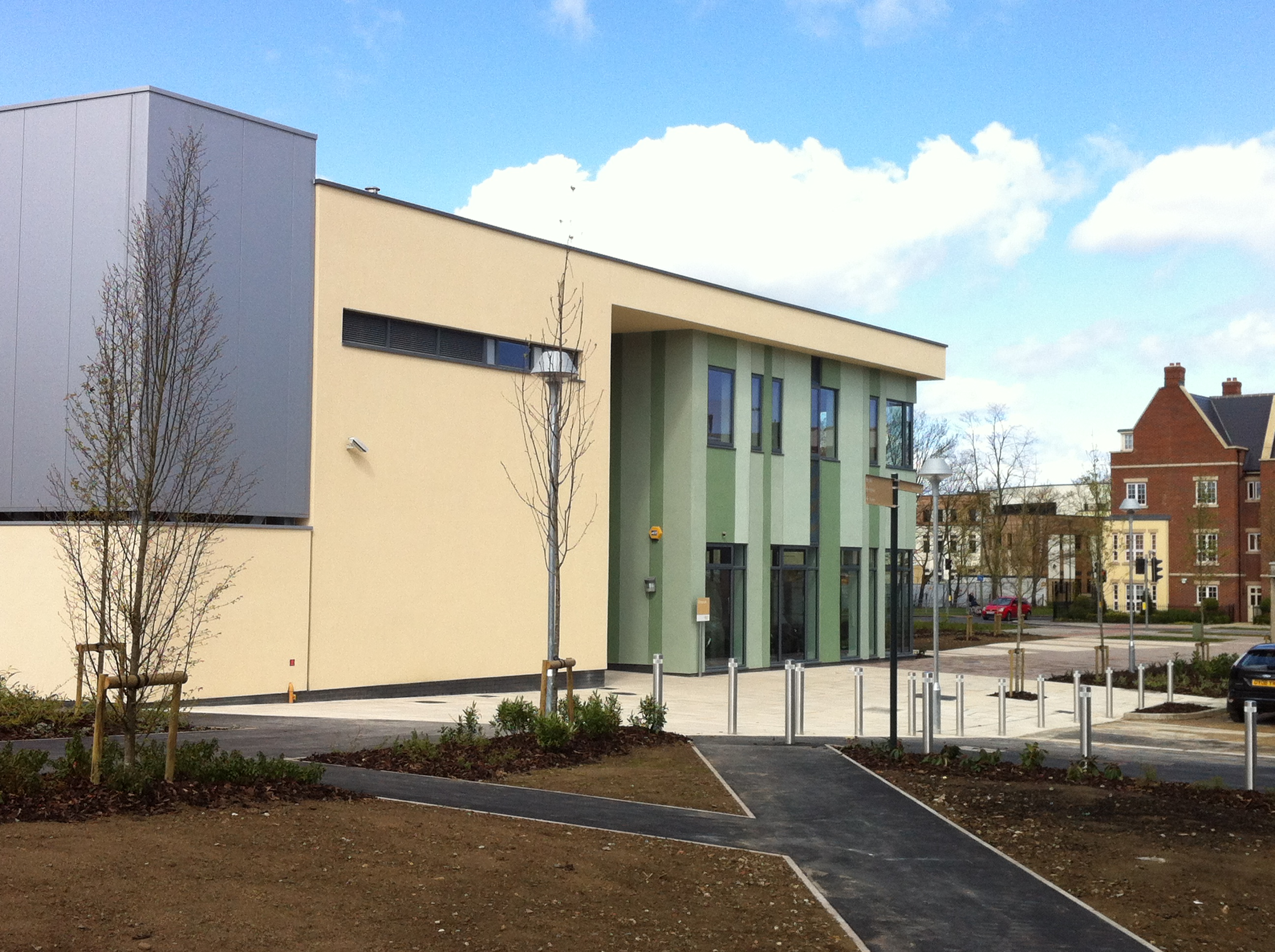
- Windrush building at Witney Campus
- Abingdon Campus: Wootton Road, Abingdon, OX14 1GG; England; Witney Campus: Holloway Road, Witney OX28 6NE; England

Information
- Type: Further education
- Established: 1 April 2001
- Local authority: Oxfordshire
- Principal: Jacqui Canton
- Gender: Co-educational
- Enrollment: 9200 (2024)
  - Young people: 2000 (2024)
  - Adult learners: 6500 (2024)
  - Apprentices: 700 (2024)
- Campuses: Abingdon Campus; Witney Campus; Common Leys Farm
- Website: abingdon-witney.ac.uk

Abingdon & Witney College is a further education provider in the United Kingdom. It was established on 1 April 2001 after the merger of Abingdon College and West Oxfordshire College. It has three main campuses: Abingdon Campus, Witney Campus, and Common Leys Farm.

== History ==
In the early 1960s, the North Berkshire College of Further Education was built. It was renamed to Abingdon College of Further Education sometime after 1974. Abingdon and Witney College was established in 1 April 2001 after the merger of Abingdon College and West Oxfordshire College. After it underwent a £7.4 million redevelopment, it reopened in July 2012. A new building had been built both on its Abingdon campus, and on its Witney College campus in Witney. The new buildings according to the BBC included "TV and radio studios, editing suites, two beauty salons, two hairdressing salons, art and design studios, science labs and conference facilities."

The college was graded Good for overall effectiveness, with Outstanding leadership and management, by Ofsted in January 2014, and also graded as 'good' in 2024. In 2015 the college was the No.1 Further Education College in England for 16-18 year old success rates. In June 2015, the Oxfordshire Skills and Learning Service (OSLS) transferred from Oxfordshire County Council to Abingdon & Witney College. In 2024, Jacqui Canton remained CEO of the college as well as Principal.

== Campuses ==
=== Abingdon Campus ===
The Abingdon Campus has undergone major refurbishment over the years, with the building work completed in late 2015. Part of the refurbishment was the Advanced Skills Centre, funded by the Local Enterprise Partnership.

=== Witney Campus ===
The redevelopment of the Witney campus was completed in early 2016. Among the new facilities is a television studio. A Construction Skills Centre is also on-site.

=== Common Leys Farm Campus ===
The Common Leys campus is a 60-acre plot in Hailey, Oxfordshire designed for land-based courses. Witney Stud Farm is based at the Common Leys campus and is home to a thoroughbred stud and equestrian center, which has been awarded a Queen's Anniversary Prize. The facility houses animals such as a family of meerkats, cows, donkeys, sheep, goats, and alpacas. It opened a livestock technology building in May 2019 for agritech classes. It also has a horticulture unit, equine facilities, a dog grooming room, and a canine hydrotherapy center.

The Common Leys Campus was graded "outstanding" by Ofsted in January 2014. Abingdon and Witney College is a member of the Land Based Colleges Aspiring to Excellence (Landex).

=== Bicester Construction Skills Centre ===
Bicester Construction Skills Centre, opened in 2021, as part of the College's commitment to delivering more apprenticeships across the county, providing over 100 apprentice places each year, including provisions for adults.

== Programs ==
As well as vocational qualifications, Abingdon & Witney College is an apprenticeship provider.

Abingdon & Witney College provides vocational courses for post-16 students, as well as Higher Education, part-time and Professional programmes.

=== Higher education ===
Abingdon & Witney College has developed working links with Oxford Brookes University on higher education courses.

== See also ==
- List of UCAS institutions
