= College of Agriculture, Food and Rural Enterprise =

Agricultural university in Northern Ireland

College of Agriculture, Food and Rural Enterprise (CAFRE) is a public tertiary level land-based college offering training in agriculture, food technology, horticulture, equine and agri-business. Operating at three sites in Northern Ireland, the college is funded by the Department of Agriculture, Environment and Rural Affairs (DAERA) of the Northern Ireland Executive. It is an associate member of the Landex consortium of "Land Based Colleges Aspiring to Excellence".

== History ==
=== Founding of three campuses (1907–1999) ===
CAFRE has three campuses in Northern Ireland, which began as individual colleges.

In January 1907, Ulster Dairy School was opened by the Department of Agriculture and Technical Instruction for Ireland in Loughry. It catered to female students and had two main courses. It was transferred to the Northern Ireland Ministry of Agriculture in 1922. In 1949, it became Loughry Agricultural College, and it became co-educational in 1962. In the 1970s, it was known as the Loughry College of Agriculture and Food Technology. In the 1990s, it became part of CAFRE.

With the intent of creating an agricultural college in northeast Ulster, the Greenmount estate was purchased in 1910 by the County Antrim Committee of Agriculture. After some changes to the building, the first session was held on 8 October 1912 with 11 students.

The Enniskillen campus was founded in 1967 as Enniskillen College. In 1992, it added equine-related programs.

=== Recent years (2000-2025) ===
In 2010, a total of 1,561 students were attending, of whom around 400 were full-time undergraduate students.

In 2024, CAFRE began a £32 million redevelopment of its Greenmount Campus in Antrim. It was also investing £43 million into its Loughry campus outside Cookstown.

Eric Long was head of education at CAFRE in 2025. In 2025, it launched two new bachelor's degrees in agri-food developed with Ulster University.

== Students ==
In 2025, its website listed 1,700 students.

The school's The Students' Council is affiliated with the National Union of Students.

== Notable alumni ==
- Helen Mulholland, Irish master blender

== Campuses ==
- Greenmount Campus at Muckamore near Antrim in County Antrim (originally Greenmount College of Agriculture and Horticulture, founded in 1912)
- Enniskillen Campus at Levaghy near Enniskillen in County Fermanagh (formerly Enniskillen College of Agriculture, first student intake in 1967)
- Loughry Campus between Cookstown and Dungannon in County Tyrone (founded in 1907 as The Ulster Dairy School)

== See also ==
- List of agricultural universities and colleges
- List of UCAS institutions
- List of universities in the United Kingdom
