= Kingston Maurward House =

Country house in Dorset, England

Coordinates: 50.7183°N 2.4048°W

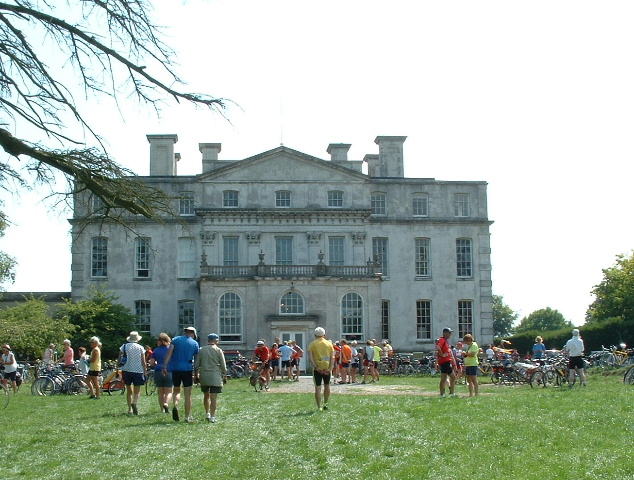
Kingston Maurward

Kingston Maurward House is a large Grade I listed Georgian English country house set in a 750-acre (3 square km) estate in Dorset situated in the Frome valley two miles east of Dorchester.

== History ==
There has been a manor house at Kingston since the late 14th century, replaced in the late 16th century with a manor house which is still in the grounds. The present mansion was built by George Pitt (1663-1735) of Stratfield Saye House, cousin of William Pitt the Elder, between 1717 and 1720 on the estate brought to him by his second wife Lora daughter of Audley Grey. The mansion was in red brick, but after derogatory comments from King George III, Pitt clad the house in Portland limestone. The building faces south, and has a projecting central section. The north facade is similar in design with the addition of a 20th-century porch. Much of the house is now used by Kingston Maurward College, though some of it is used for private functions.

In 2016, the house was flooded after a pipe burst above the house's main hall. The consultants brought in to assess the damage discovered that the room had been redecorated and was designed to use white and stone to accent the mouldings. The discovery led to a restoration to its original form.

== Grounds and gardens ==
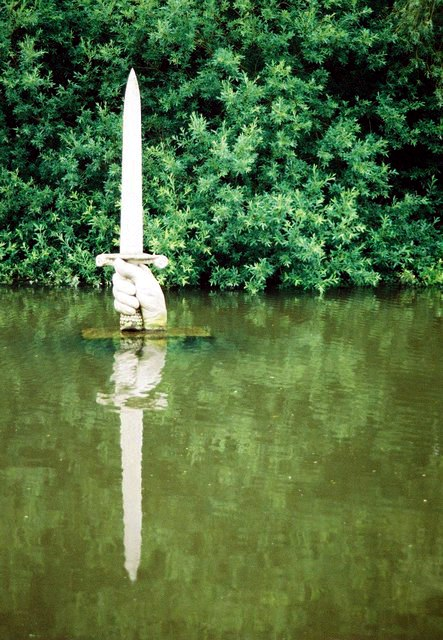
A statue of Excalibur, King Arthur's legendary sword, at Kingston Maurward

The grounds of Kingston Maurward, which are used for the land-based college, are open to the public and include the farm areas and extensive gardens. Both the house and grounds are owned by Kingston Maurward College. Also in the grounds is Kingston Maurward Manor House, built in 1590, an earlier mansion which was narrowly saved from demolition when the estate was acquired. Following refurbishment it is a private residence.

The gardens are Grade II* listed in the National Register of Historic Parks and Gardens.

== See also ==
- Kingston Maurward College
