= Suffolk Rural College =

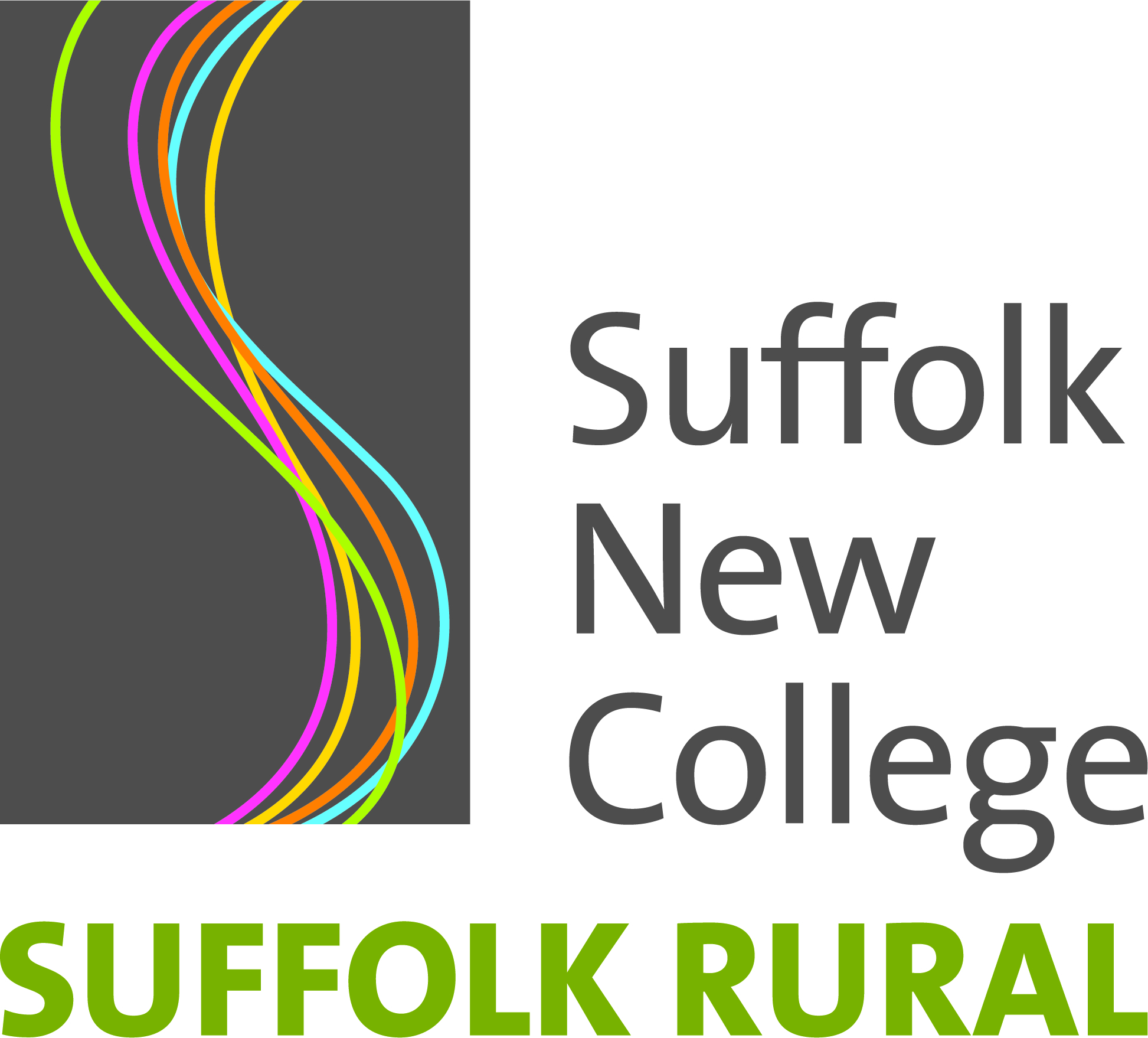

Location
- Otley; Ipswich, Suffolk, IP6 9EY; England
- 52.141°N 1.213°E

Information
- Type: Further education college
- Local authority: Suffolk
- Department for Education URN: 130821 Tables
- Acting Principal: Alan Pease
- Gender: Coeducational
- Age: 16+
- Website: www.suffolk.ac.uk

Suffolk Rural College is an English further education college in the village of Otley, Suffolk.

The college was founded in 1970 as East Suffolk Agricultural Institute. It merged with Ipswich-based Suffolk New College in 2020, having previously been partnered with Easton College in Norfolk.

== The college ==
The college offers full-time courses and apprenticeships in the following curriculum areas:

- Agriculture
- Animal Management
- Arboriculture
- Construction
- Equine Studies
- Fisheries
- Floristry
- Foundation Learning
- Horticulture

== Location ==
The campus has specialist vocational workshops and outdoor facilities, as well as general college buildings.

The campus consists of:

- A working farm for Agriculture
- Equine facilities
- Floristry workshops
- Commercial Dog Grooming parlour
- Facilities for Arboriculture
- Horticulture greenhouses
- Land-Based Service Engineering workshop
- Construction workshops
- Engineering, Motor Vehicle and HGV workshops
- Foundation Learning areas
- Range of Sports facilities

== The Farm ==
On the farm the college have:

- Red-poll cattle.
- Sheep flock and seasonal lambs.
- Poultry and seasonal chicks.
- Goats.
- Horses and equine facilities (inside and outdoors).
- Pigs.
- Alpacas.
- Land-based engineering technology, including tractors.
- Arable crops.
- 95 acres of farmland; made up of grassland, mixed cropping, and environmental areas.

In June 2022, the college announced its desire to open a Farm Shop on campus when visited by MP Dan Poulter

== Notable alumni ==
- Michael Perry (Mr Plant Geek)
