= Anthony Rosen =

Anthony Rosen (19 December 1930 – 22 March 2007) was a farmer who bucked the trend towards smaller scale organic farming. An entrepreneurial agriculturalist, he became an energetic advocate of large-scale farming.

== Biography ==
After attending Framlingham College, Suffolk, and subsequently National Service, where he reached the rank of captain, he attended Plumpton College.

In 1956 he managed to secure a position as manager of a heavy land farm in Sussex. He began to formulate views on farming practice and founded the Farm Management Association and chaired the Farm Buildings Association. After Sussex he set up Fountain Farming where he put his farming practice views into operation and established a large scale intensive food production business that, with a dairy herd of over 5,000 animals and over 30,000 acres (120 km^{2}) of production, became the largest private farm in Europe.

He had to pull out of this business when he ran out of investment partners and concentrated over the next few years in foreign enterprises where he held many senior posts in a variety of countries including Zimbabwe, Australia and New Zealand.

Alongside his farming activities he was a journalist with a column in Farming News and also wrote the occasional obituary in The Times.

In 1978 he became chairman of the Farmers' Club, and also served on the BBC’s Farm Advisory Committee.

Rosen was survived by his wife Hilary, two sons and a daughter.
