= Nathan "Nearest" Green =

American master whiskey distiller (1820 –?)

- Born: c. 1820
- Died: after 1880
- Occupation: Distiller
- Known for: Teaching Jasper "Jack" Daniel, founder of Jack Daniel's Tennessee Whiskey
- Relatives: Victoria Eady Butler (great-great-granddaughter)

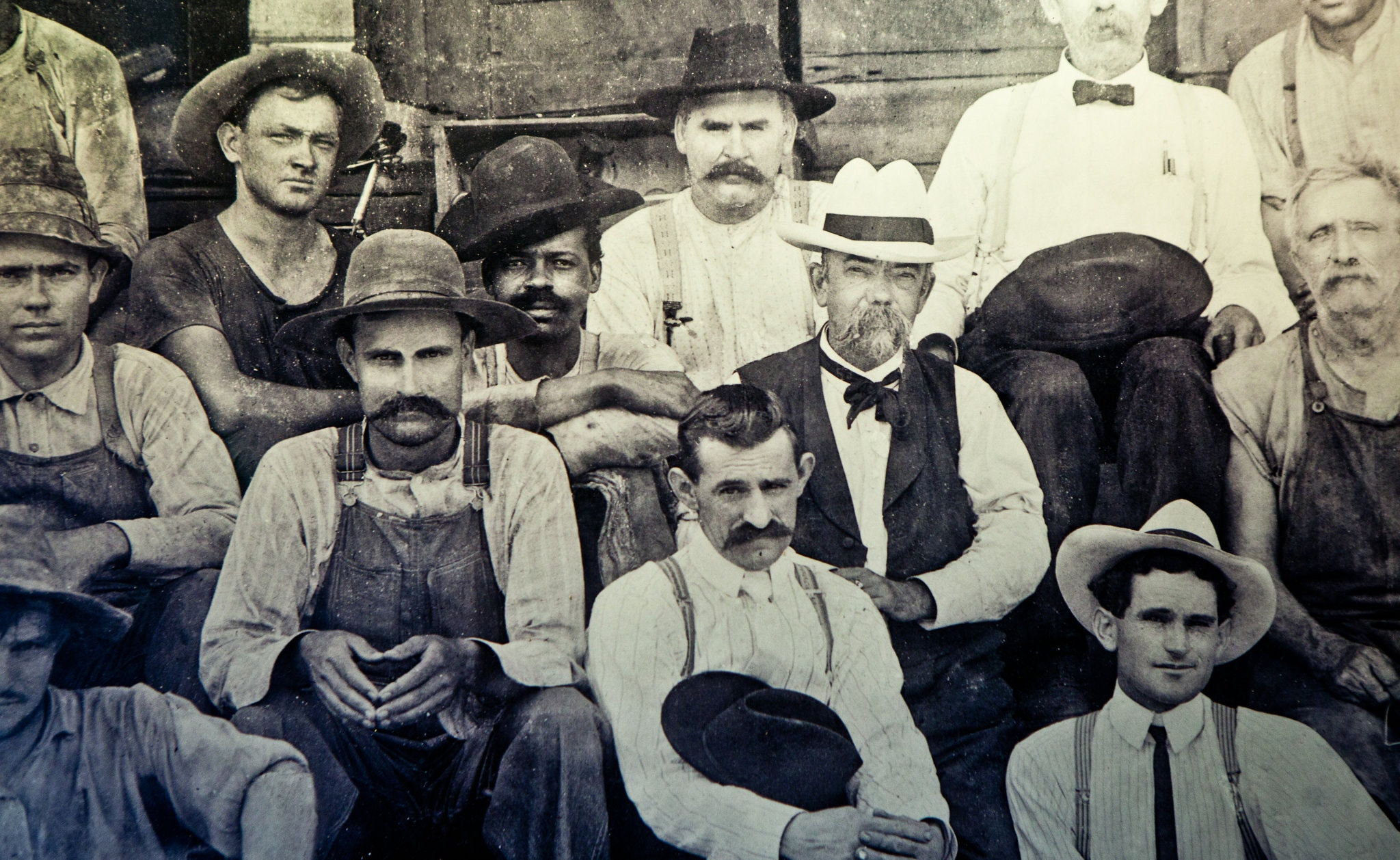
1904 image of Jack Daniel; seated to his right is likely George Green, the son of Nathan "Nearest" Green. There is no known photograph of Nearest Green.

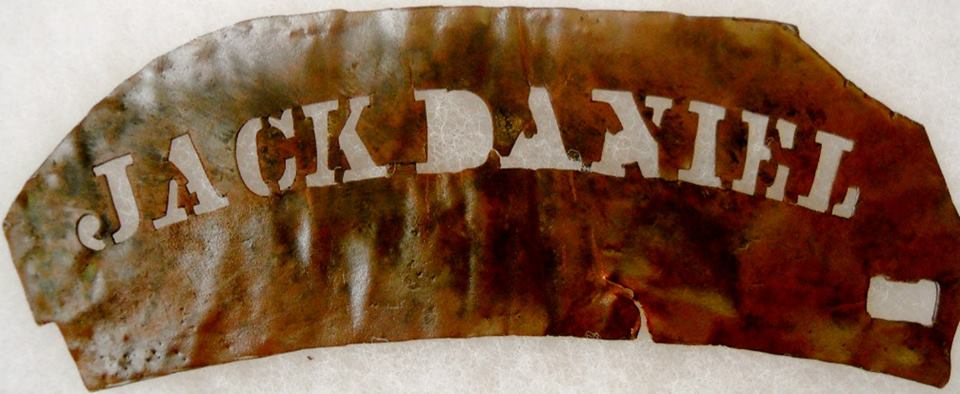
19th-century Jack Daniel bottle jug stencil found 9 in (230 mm) beneath ground surface where Nearest Green distilled whiskey in the mid-to-late 1800s

Nathan "Nearest" Green (c. 1820 – after 1880), incorrectly spelled "Nearis" in an 1880 census, was an American head stiller, more commonly referred to as a master distiller. Born into slavery and emancipated after the American Civil War, he taught his distilling techniques to Jack Daniel, founder of the Jack Daniel's Tennessee whiskey distillery. Green was hired as the first master distiller for Jack Daniel Distillery, and he is the first African-American master distiller on record in the United States.

== Biography ==
Sometime in the 1850s, when Jack Daniel was a child, he went to work for Dan Call, a preacher, grocer, and distiller. The New York Times reported that according to company lore, "the preacher was a busy man, and when he saw promise in young Jack, he taught him how to run his whiskey still".

However, in June 2016, The New York Times published a story suggesting Daniel's true teacher may have been Green, one of the enslaved people Call owned. The newspaper reported that historians and locals have known the Green story for decades. Green's story – according to the article, "built on oral history and the thinnest of archival trails" – may never be definitively proved. A USA Today article published in July 2017 corrected the Nearis spelling of his name and confirmed that Jack Daniel said his correct name was Nathan "Nearest" Green. Another article published by The Tennessee Tribune in March 2019 confirmed through the story of Fawn Weaver, an African American real estate investor and author, that Green's story continues to be passed down orally through the generations.

Documentation shows that Green was owned by a firm known as Landis & Green, who likely hired him out to Call for a fee. Green was one of a few enslaved people who stayed on to work with Call after the Emancipation Proclamation. When introducing Green to an 8-year old Jack Daniel, Call is quoted as saying, "Uncle Nearest is the best whiskey maker that I know of." Call reportedly said to Green, "I want [Jack] to become the world's best whiskey distiller – if he wants to be. You help me teach him."

Green served as master distiller. According to one biographer, "Only a few years older than Jack, [Green] taught him all about the still."

Some critics argue that Jack Daniel had bought Green as a slave and used Green's recipe for his own profit, but the Tennessee Tribune documented that "Daniel never owned slaves and spoke openly about Green's role as his mentor".

Known as Nearest Green, or "Uncle Nearest", he played the fiddle and was a lively entertainer. Green's descendants say this trait was passed down to his son, Jesse Green.

Slavery ended with ratification of the Thirteenth Amendment to the United States Constitution in 1865. Daniel opened his distillery a year later and immediately employed two of Green's sons, George and Eli Green. In all, at least three of Green's sons were a part of the Jack Daniel Distillery staff: George Green, Edde Green, and Eli Green. At least four of Nearest's grandchildren joined the Jack Daniel team, Ott, Charlie, Otis, and Jesse Green. In all, seven straight generations of Nearest Green's descendants have worked for Jack Daniel Distillery, with three direct descendants continuing to work there as of November 2017.

Nathan "Nearest" Green was married to Harriet Green, and they had 11 children together – nine sons and two daughters. Four of their sons, Louis, George, Jesse, and Eli, are listed in the 1870 census. Seven of the sons and both daughters are listed in the 1880 federal census.

== Legacy ==
Author Fawn Weaver launched the Nearest Green Foundation to commemorate Green. The foundation is responsible for a new museum, memorial park, and book about his life. In addition, it has established college scholarships for Green's descendants. In July 2017, Uncle Nearest, Inc., created a whiskey honoring the legacy of Nearest Green. Debuting as "Uncle Nearest 1856 Premium Whiskey", it was created by working with two Tennessee distilleries, but not Jack Daniel Distillery.

In August 2017, however, Brown-Forman Corporation, which owns the Jack Daniel Distillery and brand, officially recognized Green as its first head stiller – now called master distiller – and added him to the company's website. In October 2017, Brown-Forman added his legacy to its official tours and a large display at the Jack Daniel's Visitors Center.

In September 2017, the Nearest Green Foundation announced the inaugural class of descendants receiving full scholarships to college and grad school to continue their ancestor's legacy of excellence. The foundation is funded by the sales of Uncle Nearest Premium Whiskey and the sales of Jack Daniel's official biography, Jack Daniel's Legacy.

Uncle Nearest's Master distiller, Victoria Eady Butler, is Green's great-great-granddaughter, and the first known African-American female whiskey master distiller.
