= Anne Schwegmann-Fielding =

British sculptor and mosaic artist (born 1967)

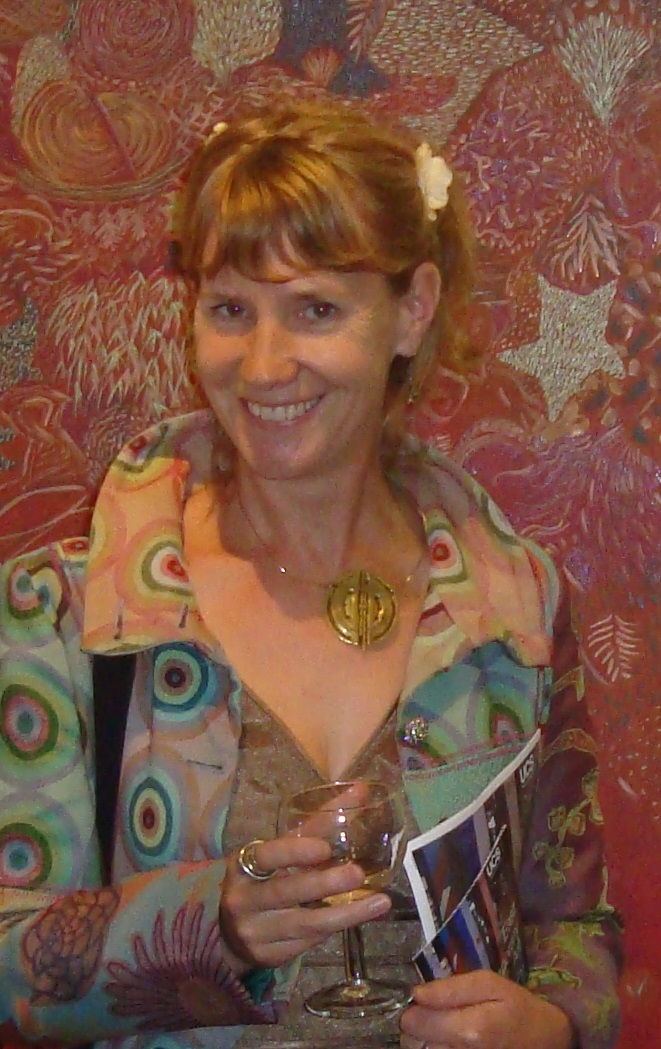
- Artist Anne Schwegmann-Fielding at an art opening in Ipswich
- Born: Colchester
- Occupations: sculptor and mosaic artist
- Website: anneschwegmann-fielding.com

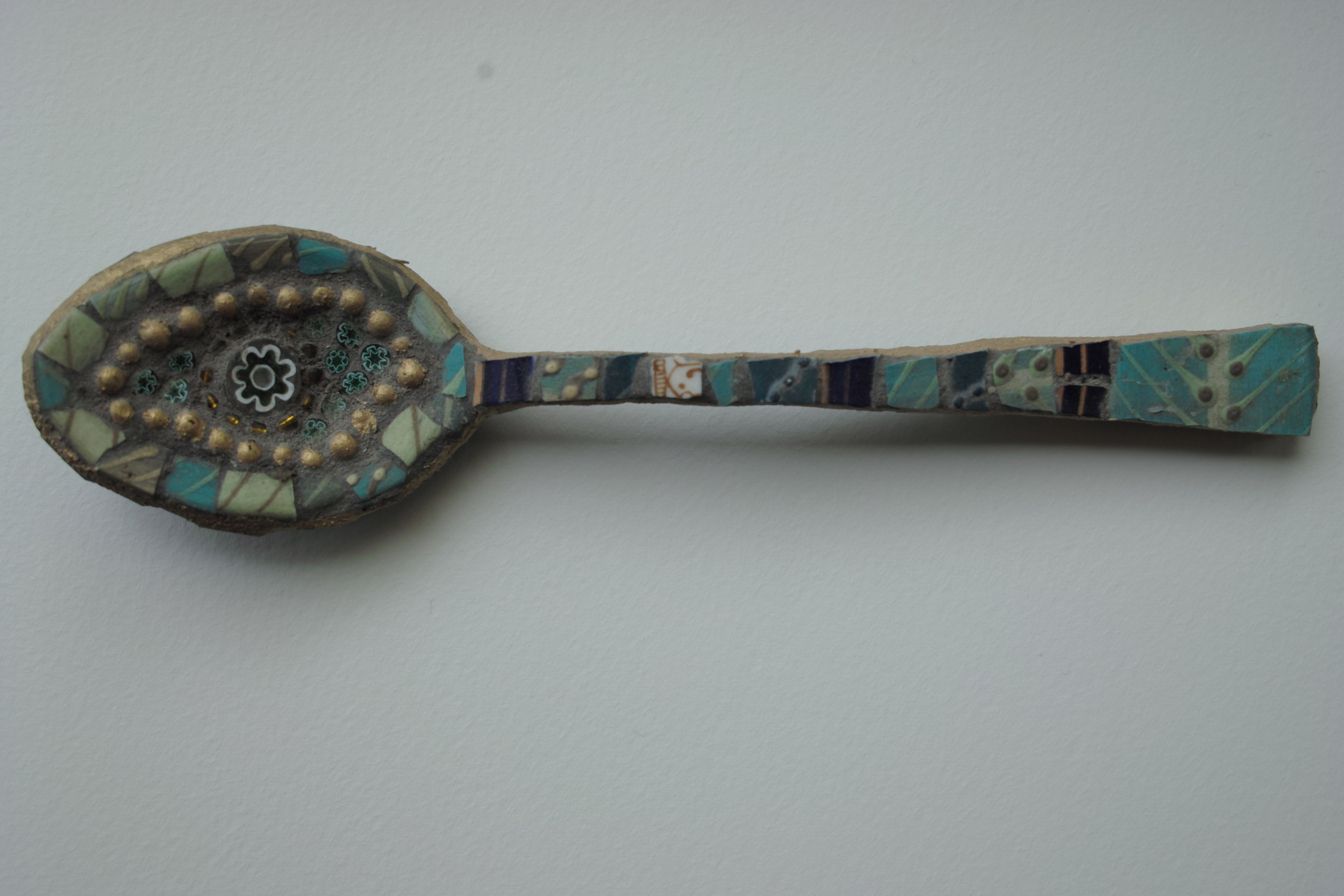
'Spoon' by British Sculptor Anne Schwegmann-Fielding

Anne Schwegmann-Fielding (born 1967) is a British sculptor and mosaic artist, who has been producing artworks made from recycled materials since the early 1990s.

== Biography ==
Schwegmann-Fielding established her studio in Colchester, Essex in 1993, a couple of years after graduating in Fine Art at Wolverhampton University. Her work is informed by the discarded resources of daily life, especially with respect to the re-use and recycling of obsolete materials. This is reflected in her transformation of objects such as old tools, implements and vehicles into sculptures through the application of broken tableware, shattered glass and jewels to their surfaces.

In 2008 Schwegmann-Fielding received an 'International Research Fellowship for The Contemporary Crafts' and travelled to India where she met and worked with Nek Chand at the Rock Garden of Chandigarh in India. She cites Chand as having had an influence on her practice along with the work of the kutchi Artisans of India. Of her own sculpture Schwegmann-Fielding says that "adornment is central to my working process, essentially giving an unwanted object a second skin. Covering abandoned tools and utensils amongst other things, with broken crockery, glass and jewellery."

She has worked with Channel 4, BBC Television, London Zoo, Kunstsymposium, Kleinbreitenbach, (1999, 2006, 2012) – Schloss Elisabethenburg, Braintree Museum, Kent History and Library Centre, Symington Building, Writtle College, Vorsicht Kunst, Meiningen and Arts Reverie, Gujarat, India and is a professional member of BAMM (The British Association for Modern Mosaic).

== Selected collections ==
- Chelmsford Museums
- East Contemporary Art Collection
- Rock Garden of Chandigarh, India

== Awards ==
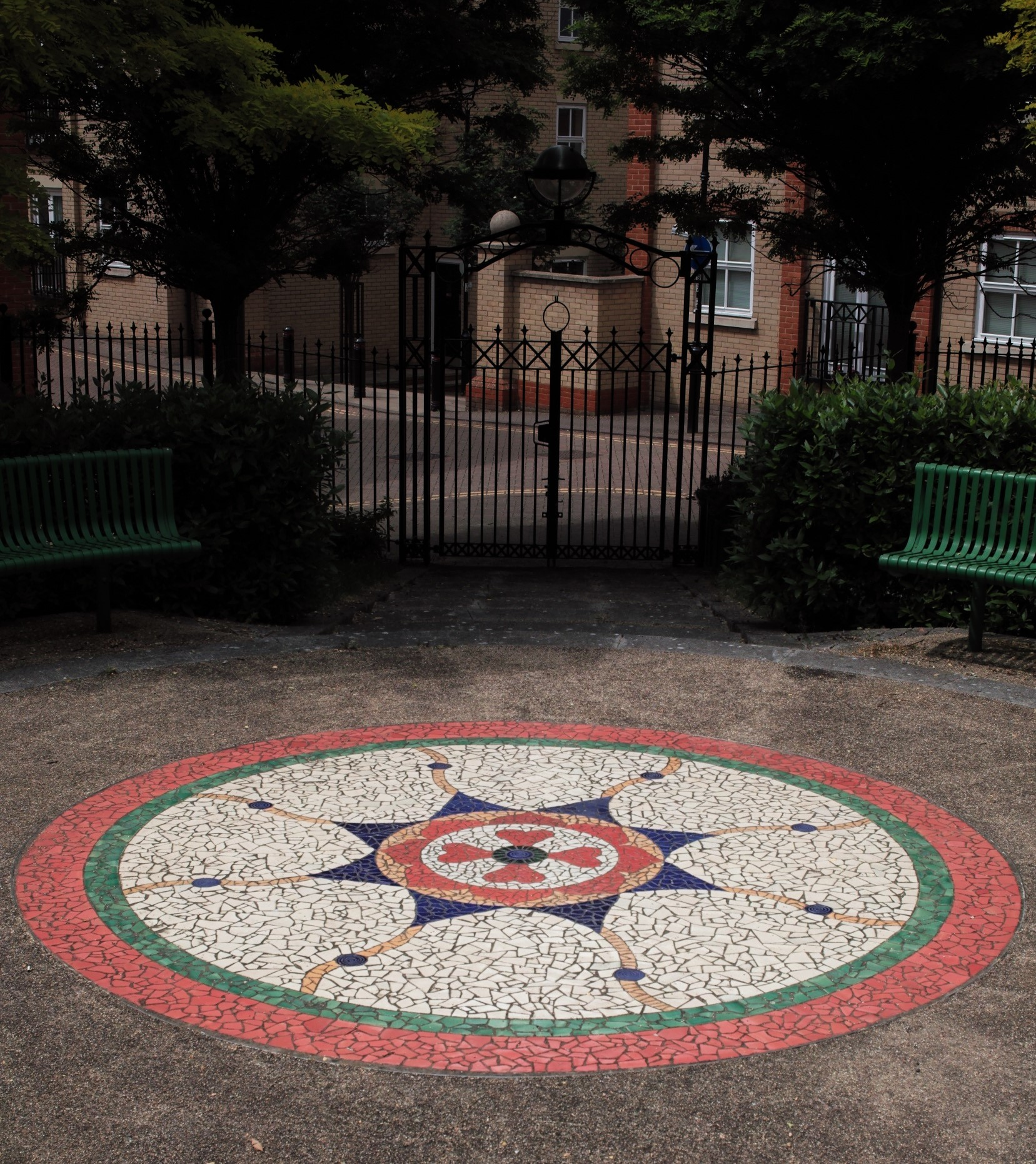
'Balkerne Star' designed by Anne Schwegmann-Fielding, Balkerne Heights, Colchester – made in 2006 and inspired by a Roman mosaic flooring found in Colchester.

- (2008) International Research Fellowship for The Contemporary Crafts
- (2005) Leverhulme Trust Award
