= Sturgeons House =

Country estate in Essex, England

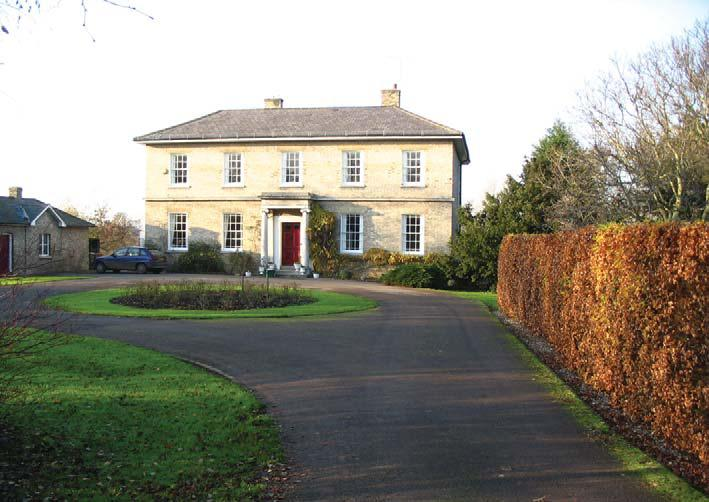
- Sturgeons House in 2005

- Location in Essex
- 51.7365°N 0.4063°E
- Location: Writtle, Essex, England

History
- Built: 1830
- Built for: William Addy

Site notes
- Architect: Thomas Smith
- Architectural style: Georgian

Listed Building – Grade II
- Designated: 19 June 1975
- Reference no.: 1237071

Sturgeons House is a Grade II listed country estate located west of the small village of Writtle in Essex, England. At its height, the estate comprised around 500 acres (2,000,000 m^{2}). However, it currently holds only around 6 acres (24,000 m^{2}) of ground. The house is currently under renovation, including an extension to the rear of the property. The house, along with the surrounding barns, is an example of an early model farm.

== History ==
There has been human settlement at the site since 1280, when William Turgis established a farm there. The name 'Sturgeons' derived from the Turgis family-name. The location was chosen upon the discovery of a natural spring in the area.

The current house was built in the 1830s in the Georgian style. It was built for William Addy, who spent the greater part of his fortune on the project. Due to ill health, he moved from the property soon after it was finished. The Blythe family then came to own the house and surrounding farmland for almost a hundred years.

In the mid 19th century, Sturgeons farm became a leading model farm. The farm's owners researched and demonstrated improvements in agricultural techniques, efficiency, and building layout. Education, and commitment to improving welfare standards of workers were also aspects of the ideal farm movement. The farm buildings were designed to be beautiful as well as utilitarian - inspired by the ideals of the Enlightenment.

In the 1930s, Sturgeons farm (including Sturgeons House) was acquired by Writtle College. In recent times, the house has been the home of the Principal of Writtle College. In 2007 the college sold the property as part of its restructuring and modernisation programme. Sturgeons Farm is still retained by the college.

== Wildlife ==
The area is rich in local wildlife. There are small badger and fox populations, along with Reeves's muntjac; moorhens; pheasants; hares and rabbits. There are also numerous oak, yew and willow trees.

== Roman villa speculation ==
Excavation work in fields to the rear of the house has resulted in Roman pottery and metalware being discovered. Speculation that a Roman villa once existed on the site has yet to be verified.
