= Master blender =

Individual developing blended spirits

In the context of the alcohol industry, a master blender is an individual who develops specific blended spirits using a combination of spirits with different characteristics. For example, in the Scotch whisky industry, master blenders choose which single malts and grain whiskies to combine to make particular brands of blended whisky. A master blender is not the same thing as a master distiller, although one person may do both jobs at small craft distilleries. As the name suggests, the blender creates blends using spirits from different casks and is responsible for making sure the product remains consistent across different batches, while the distiller is either directly responsible for the mashing and distilling of spirits or simply holds the title as the administrative and marketing figurehead of the company.

The term "master blender" is often associated with the whisky industry, but it is also used for professionals who blend other spirits, such as rum, cognac, brandy, and vodka.

Master blenders are also employed in a wide range of other industries, including but not exclusively coffee, tea, perfume, cigars and tobacco.

== History ==
In terms of whisky, the practice of blending distilled whiskies has likely existed in some form for centuries, but the craft of deliberately blending whiskies for flavour purposes began after Aeneas Coffey invented a new type of still to make grain whiskies in 1831. William Sanderson and Andrew Usher are credited with making one of the first whisky blends in the 1860s.

"The master blender role evolved in Scotland in the 19th century to manage the increasingly complex inventories held by Scotch whisky companies owning a number of distilleries and whisky brands."

— Rachel Barrie, Master Blender at BenRiach, GlenDronach, and Glenglassaugh Distilleries, The Whiskey Wash

== Responsibilities ==
Being a master blender involves evaluating barreled spirits with different characteristics, such as age, storage conditions, and cask type, and then choosing the best combination of spirits to achieve a desired final product. The master blender generally has two primary responsibilities:

1. Make sure every batch produced under the same label tastes the same as previous batches
2. Create new appealing blends that deliberately differ from existing labels

For some companies, the master blender also serves as the public figurehead for the company and may even have administrative and marketing duties outside of blending responsibilities.

== Blended whisky ==
Legal definitions for blended whiskies vary. In Scotland, blended whiskies may include grain whiskies and come from numerous distilleries with different malts. In the U.S., the standard is different, and blended whiskeys must contain at least 20 percent straight whiskey combined with neutral spirits or other whiskeys.

A blend could be composed of as many as 20 or more different whiskies with different flavour profiles and ages, which makes maintaining product consistency over time a challenging accomplishment for a master blender. It is sometimes necessary to replace whiskies that go into a blend, and the master blender is responsible for accomplishing this feat without altering the characteristics of the final product.

== Training ==
Experience and a good "nose" are the two most important characteristics for a master blender, although some may also have a supporting academic background in chemistry, microbiology, or other related type of science. Many blenders start as apprentices and work with blenders who have years of experience nosing spirits. It may take years of practice to develop the necessary skills, and the general consensus is that the title of master blender should be earned.

Nosing spirits involves using the sense of smell to identify specific characteristics, such as different aromas and flavours, that work together to create the desired final product. After a particular blend is developed, then the master blender is responsible for ensuring all batches of that brand remain consistent in the future.

In some cases, formal training outside of on-the-job training may be necessary. For example, according to Max Warner, Global Brand Ambassador for Chivas Regal:

"You will need to have a qualification from the Institute of Brewing and Distilling to be considered for a position within the Blending Team. There are tests carried out on blenders' olfactory senses (the nose), as this is the most important ‘device’ for appraising and assessing Whisky."

== Notable people ==
In most cases, master blending is a skill achieved after years of experience. Notable examples of individuals in the industry who have achieved master blender status include:

- Melanie Asher: The owner of Macchu Pisco, Asher is the first woman to own a pisco – a South American type of brandy – export company.
- Rachel Barrie: Currently the master Scotch blender for BenRiach Distillery Company, Barrie has also served as master blender for Morrison Bowmore Distillers and Glenmorangie. She is credited as being the first female whisky blender (2003).
- Dr. Jim Beveridge: Beveridge serves as master blender for Johnnie Walker Scotch whiskies, made by Diageo.
- Victoria Eady Butler: Butler is the first Black woman to be a Master Blender and serves as Master Blender for Uncle Nearest Premium Whiskey.
- Kirsteen Campbell: Campbell is the first female master blender for The Famous Grouse, a producer of Scotch whisky.
- Brian Kinsman: Currently the Malt Master for Glenfiddich, Kinsman is also responsible for Grant's blended Scotch whiskies produced by William Grant & Sons, and he assists David Stewart with the Balvenie line.
- Billy Leighton: Leighton serves as master blender for the Jameson Irish Whiskey line produced by Irish Distillers.
- Andrew MacKay: MacKay is the master blender in charge of Crown Royal Canadian whisky, made by Diageo.
- Stephanie Macleod: Macleod is the first woman to serve as master blender for John Dewar & Sons, the Scotch whisky maker behind the Dewar's brand.
- Caroline Martin: A master blender for Diageo, Martin created Roe & Co. Irish whiskey.
- Drew Mayville: Previously with Seagram, Mayville is currently the master blender at Buffalo Trace Distillery for Sazerac.
- Helen Mulholland: As the company's first female master blender, Mulholland is responsible for Bushmills Irish Whiskey, made by Proximo Spirits.
- Richard Paterson: In his role as master blender for Whyte & Mackay, Paterson is responsible for the Dalmore line of whiskies. Nicknamed "The Nose", he has a $2.6 million insurance policy on his nose issued by Lloyd's of London.
- Jassil Villanueva Quintana: The master blender for Brugal & Co. Rum, she is the first woman and the youngest individual to serve as "maestra ronera" for the company.
- Colin Scott: A longtime Scotch whisky blender, Scott serves as master blender for Chivas Brothers, a division of Pernod Ricard. His career also includes experience at Glenlivet Distillers and Seagram.
- Joy Spence: The longtime master blender for Appleton Estate Rum, Spence is credited as the first female master blender in the spirits industry (1997).
- David Stewart: Creator of the Balvenie line of Scotch whiskies for William Grant & Sons, Stewart has been with the company for more than 40 years and is also in charge of the popular Glenfiddich brand.
- Alex Thomas: Thomas is the master blender behind The Sexton Irish Whiskey, a sherry cask-finished blend made by Proximo Spirits.
