= Askham Bryan College =

Agricultural college in York, England

Coordinates: 53.921°N 1.161°W

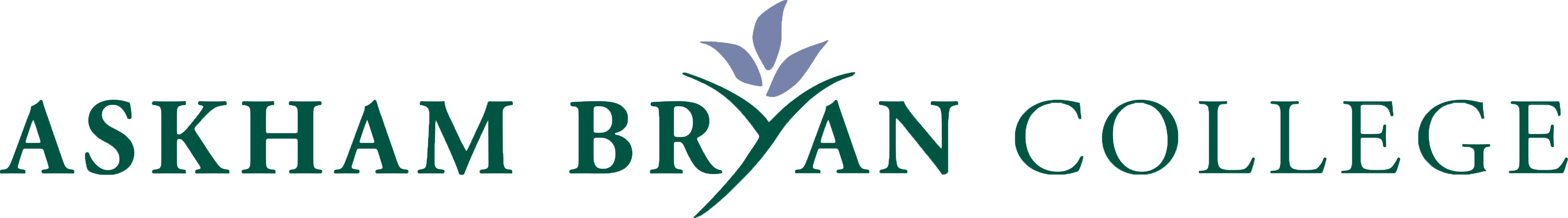

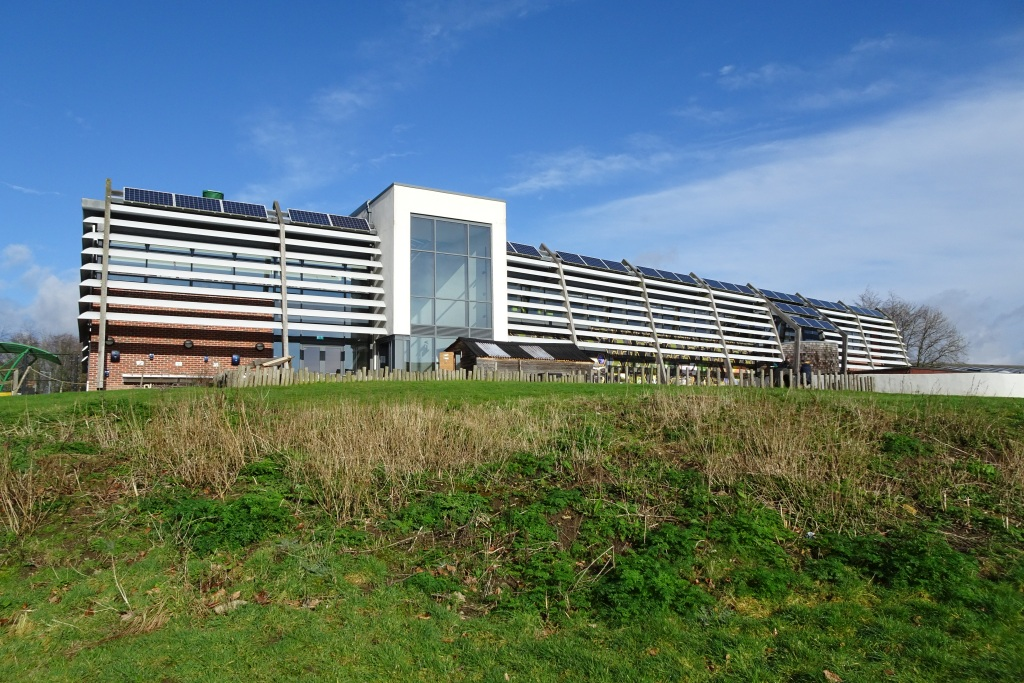
- Wildlife Centre Building of the York Campus
- Askham Bryan, York, North Yorkshire, YO23 3FR

Information
- Type: Further education college and Higher education university college
- Established: 1936; 90 years ago
- Department for Education URN: 130595 Tables
- Ofsted: Reports
- Principal: Tim Whitaker
- Enrollment: 5,000
- Website: www.askham-bryan.ac.uk

Askham Bryan College is a specialist land-based further education college and university college based in Askham Bryan, York, England. Established in 1936 as the Yorkshire Agricultural Institute, Askham Bryan College has campuses in Askham Bryan, Gateshead, Middlesbrough, Saltaire and Wakefield. Askham Bryan College is a member of the Land Based Colleges Aspiring to Excellence (Landex).

== History ==
Askham Bryan College was built in 1936, but not opened until after World War II as the Yorkshire Agricultural Institute. It first opened to students in 1948 in Askham Bryan, York, England. 19 years later, it became the Askham Bryan College of Agriculture and Horticulture. Since its founding, the college has opened a number of facilities, including at Newcastle, Middlesbrough, Saltaire and Wakefield. Newton Rigg College, based in Penrith, Cumbria, became part of Askham Bryan College in 2011, while Liz Philip was Principal. At that time, Askham Bryan College had eight other locations, and 4,000 students. Degrees were validated by Harper Adams University College and York St John University. In July 2013, it opened a new £2.4 million campus in Penrith.

Between 2016 and 2020 student numbers at Newton Rigg fell by 40%. In 2020 Tim Whitaker announced that teaching at the Newton Rigg site would cease in July 2021. According to Cumbrian Lord Inglewood, the process of asset stripping may be "unlawful". The campus closed in 2021.

In 2022, Askham Bryan College was granted foundation degree awarding powers, allowing it to create its own named degrees for its students with the University Centre Askham Bryan, its higher education arm, becoming the only land-based college in the UK with foundation degree awarding powers. Tim Whitaker remained CEO and Principal in 2022.

== Programs and facilities ==
The college runs courses in Agriculture, Animal Management, Veterinary Nursing, Equine, Engineering, Motorsport, Horticulture, Arboriculture, Floristry, Countryside Management, Outdoor Adventure Sport, Sport Coaching and Fitness, Uniformed Public Services and Foundation Vocational Programmes.

In 2024, University Centre Askham Bryan (UCAB) had 3,850 students studying courses in areas such as animal science, agriculture, veterinary nursing, equine science and zoo and wildlife conservation.

The college farm is 1,022 acres (414 ha) and supports three farms: Westfield Farm which accommodates a 250 Holstein Friesian dairy herd and the National Beef Training Centre; East Barrow Farm which houses the college Equine Department with 53 horses and Animal Management Department; and Headley Hall Farm which is the arable farm formerly of the University of Leeds.

It opened a new gym in 2024.

== Alumni ==
- Geoffrey Smith, a horticulturalist, writer and broadcaster
- Joe Maiden, a horticulturalist and broadcaster for BBC Radio Leeds.

== See also ==
- List of UCAS institutions
- List of universities in the United Kingdom
- List of agricultural universities and colleges
- List of further education colleges in England
