= Uncle Nearest Premium Whiskey =

Brand of Tennessee whiskey

- Type: private
- Industry: Manufacturing and distillation of liquors
- Founded: July 2017 (Lynchburg, Tennessee)
- Founder: Fawn Weaver; Keith Weaver
- Headquarters: Shelbyville, Tennessee, US
- Area served: Worldwide
- Key people: Nathan "Nearest" Green (historical master distiller) Victoria Eady Butler (master blender)
- Products: Distilled and blended liquors
- Owner: Uncle Nearest, Inc.
- Website: unclenearest.com

Uncle Nearest Premium Whiskey is a brand of Tennessee whiskey produced by Uncle Nearest, Inc., headquartered in Shelbyville, Tennessee, United States. The whiskey is named after the formerly enslaved man, Nathan "Nearest" Green, who taught a young Jack Daniel the craft of distilling.

Founded in 2017, Uncle Nearest rapidly enjoyed considerable success, becoming the fastest-growing whiskey brand in the United States by 2021. Uncle Nearest was named one of the 100 Reasons to Love America by People magazine in 2021, and one of Inc.'s 5000 fastest-growing US companies from 2019 to 2022. As of 2023, eight brand variants had been produced, and Uncle Nearest was recognized as the most successful black-owned distillery in the world.

In August 2025, after Uncle Nearest defaulted on over $100 million in loans, a judge placed the company in receivership, taking control of the company away from the Weavers.

== History ==
Uncle Nearest, Inc., launched the Uncle Nearest Premium Whiskey brand in July 2017 and subsequently announced plans to expand into domestic and international markets, debuting its first whiskey, Nathan Green 1870 Single Barrel, in October 2018. It is the first spirit named after an African-American. As of September 2019, it is sold in all 50 states and twelve countries, and reached $100 million in sales in October 2022.

In 2019, Uncle Nearest announced Victoria Eady Butler, a descendant of Nathan Green, as master blender, becoming the first known African-American female whiskey master blender. She was named Master Blender of the Year by Whisky Magazine, VinePair, and The Spirits Business in 2021, and became Whisky's first back-to-back winner in 2022.

In June 2020, the Nearest Green Foundation (co-founded by Fawn and Keith Weaver) and the Jack Daniel Distillery announced the Nearest & Jack Advancement Initiative. Each company contributed $2.5 million to create the Nearest Green School of Distilling at Motlow State Community College, which includes the Leadership Acceleration Program for apprenticeships, and the Business Incubation Program, which provides expertise and resources to African-Americans entering the spirits industry.

On June 1, 2021, Uncle Nearest formed the Uncle Nearest Venture Fund, a $50 million initiative to invest in minority-founded and owned spirits brands. The company announced the Uncle Nearest HBCU Old Fashioned Challenge in January 2023 to raise $1 million for HBCU's.

In October 2023, Uncle Nearest announced the acquisition of Domaine Saint Martin, a 100-acre estate and vineyard in the Grande Champagne district of Cognac.

Known as Uncle Nearest, Nathan "Nearest" Green was acknowledged in 2016 as the first African-American master distiller on record in the United States. He taught Jack Daniel to make Tennessee whiskey and served as the first master distiller – formerly called "head stiller" – for the Jack Daniel Distillery as a free man after the Civil War. He was instrumental in developing the Lincoln County Process, the sugar maple charcoal filtering method used to make most Tennessee Whiskey.

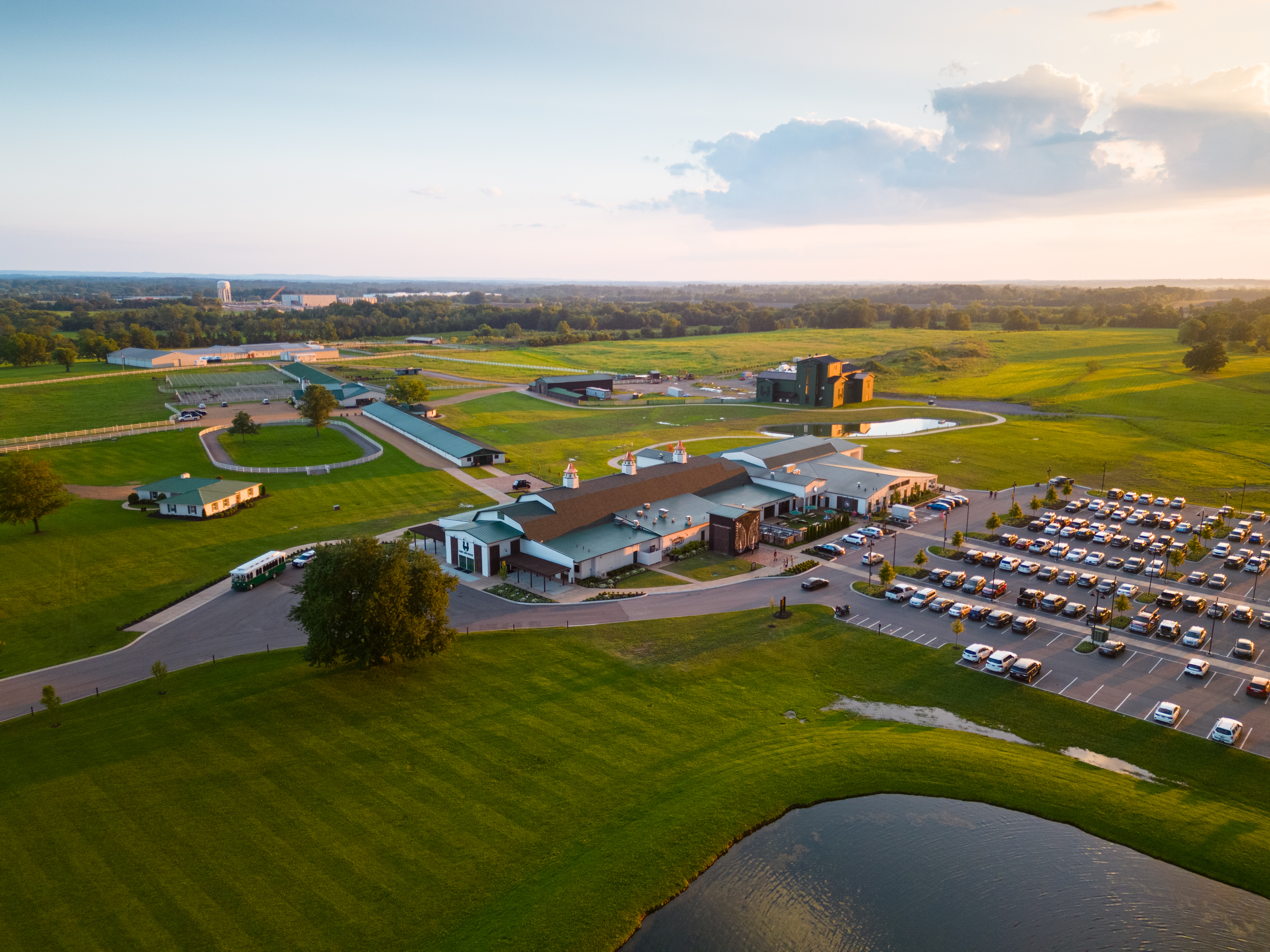
Nearest Green Distillery in Shelbyville, Tennessee

In 2017, a rezoning proposal was approved by the Bedford County board to accommodate a whiskey-themed business at the former Sand Creek Farms in Shelbyville, Tennessee. On September 14, 2019, the first phase of the Nearest Green Distillery opened, which included the Welcome House, a bottling house, a working horse and cattle farm, and the Toppy's Copper Skies Bar. It was the first distillery in the United States named after a Black person.

After a year-long closure due to the COVID-19 pandemic, the distillery re-opened its doors on Juneteenth 2021, adding a single-barrel rickhouse, an improved Welcome Center and Family Tasting Room, a restaurant, a non-alcoholic speakeasy, and the Master Blender House. That month, the distillery purchased an additional 53 acres for further expansion, and announced plans to dedicate 100 acres to grow organic corn for its blends.

On March 23, 2023, the distillery opened Humble Baron, a 202-seat entertainment venue featuring a 518-foot-long horseshoe bar (designed by Death & Co.), named the longest in the world by the Guinness World Records. The distillery's second phase will complete with the future opening of the Still House.

The company announced the purchase of an additional 109 acres in Shelbyville in May 2023.

In July 2025, Farm Credit Mid-America submitted a "Verified Complaint" in federal court against Uncle Nearest for breach of loan agreements in excess of $108 million. In response, the judge in the case placed the company in receivership.

In March 2026, Fawn Weaver attempted to wrest control of Uncle Nearest back from Phillip Young, the court-appointed receiver, and she filed for Chapter 11 bankruptcy protection for the company. However, Farm Credit and the receiver sought to block the petition, and the court ruled against Weaver, with the judge dismissing the bankruptcy petition and affirming that the receiver would retain control of the company.Both Fawn and Keith Weaver were fired from Uncle Nearest on June 1, 2026.

== Whiskeys ==
1856 Batch

The recipe behind the Uncle Nearest Tennessee whiskeys dates back to the whiskeys made in the late 1800s in Lincoln County. According to Weaver, "[the recipe] was saved from a fire just behind the square in Lynchburg, and is now under lock and key at the Farmers Bank in Lynchburg, the bank Jack Daniel founded in 1888." The recipe includes corn malt, a former whiskey ingredient long missing from Tennessee whiskeys.

The Uncle Nearest brand originally included a silver and an aged whiskey, both distilled from locally sourced grains and bottled in Tennessee. The silver whiskey takes 25 days to make, using an 11-step process that includes a triple charcoal mellowing system designed for the brand. The company added a single-barrel whiskey in July 2018.

The brand's first three releases are named after the year Nearest was born (1820), the year he was credited with perfecting the Lincoln County Process (1856), and the year he retired (1884).

As of 2023, five additional variants have been produced; 1870 Single Barrel (UK), Master Blend Edition, and three rye whiskeys: Straight Rye Whisky, Uncut/Unfiltered Straight Rye Whiskey and Single Barrel Rye.

== Awards and ratings ==
Uncle Nearest 1856 Premium Aged Whiskey	New York World Wine & Spirits Competition	2021 Best in Class - Best Tennessee Whiskey 2023 - Double Gold
Uncle Nearest 1856 Premium Aged Whiskey	2022 Chinese Wine & Spirit Competition	CWSA Whiskey of the Year
Uncle Nearest 1856 Premium Aged Whiskey	2023 L.A. Spirits Awards	Best Tennessee Whiskey
Uncle Nearest 1856 Premium Aged Whiskey	2024 World Whiskey Awards	Best Tennessee Whiskey
Uncle Nearest 1820 Nearest Green Single Barrel Edition	San Francisco World Spirits Competition	Double Gold - 2020, 2021, 2022
Uncle Nearest 1820 Nearest Green Single Barrel Edition	2023 International Whisky Competition	Best Tennessee Whiskey
Uncle Nearest 1884 Premium Small Batch Whiskey	Ascot Awards	Best American Whiskey - 2021, 2023
Uncle Nearest 1884 Premium Small Batch Whiskey	American Whiskey Masters	Gold Medal - 2022, 2023
Uncle Nearest 1884 Premium Small Batch Whiskey	2023 Chinese Wine & Spirits Awards	CWSA Whiskey of the Year
Uncle Nearest Master Blend Edition	2022 International Whisky Competition	1st Place, Tennessee Whiskey
Uncle Nearest Master Blend Edition	2022 Great American International Spirits Competition	Best in Show, Bourbon
Uncle Nearest Master Blend Edition	2023 TAG Global Spirits Awards	Best in Show, Tennessee Whiskey
Uncle Nearest Single Barrel Rye Whiskey	2023 San Francisco World Spirits Competition	Double Gold
Uncle Nearest Single Barrel Rye Whiskey	2023 International Whisky Competition	Best Rye Whiskey
Uncle Nearest Uncut & Unfiltered Rye Whiskey	2023 Whiskies of the World Awards	Gold
Uncle Nearest Straight Rye Whiskey	2023 San Francisco World Spirits Competition	Gold
