= Suffolk New College =

Location
- Rope Walk; Ipswich, Suffolk, IP4 1LT; England; 52.05542°N 1.165275°E

Information
- Type: Further education college
- Established: 2009
- Local authority: Suffolk
- Department for Education URN: 130820 Tables
- Ofsted: Reports
- Principal: Alan Pease
- Gender: Mixed
- Age: 16+
- Enrolment: Approx. 4,098 as of November 2023
- Website: Official website

Suffolk New College (formerly Suffolk College) is a further education college in Ipswich. It provides courses for students from across south Suffolk. In 2009 it constructed a new building costing £70 million.

== Overview ==
Suffolk New College is a multi-campus mixed general further education college, with the main campus located in central Ipswich. The college also runs Suffolk Rural College (Previously Otley College) and On The Coast (Previously Alde Valley Sixth Form). The college offers secondary and further education courses such as vocational programmes, T Levels, GCSEs and apprenticeships as well as some higher education and leisure learning courses.

== Awards ==
Suffolk New College was awarded Further or Higher Education Provider of the Year in November 2023 at the Suffolk Education Awards and also received finalist status in The Wellbeing, Outstanding Support for Students, Apprentice of the Year and Teacher of the Year awards.

In February 2024 Suffolk New College won the Inenco Award for Education for Sustainable Development at the Association of Colleges Beacon Awards for their college-wide green skills programme which saw sustainability embedded in enrichment projects, capital investments and curriculum development to transform teaching practice and project-led innovation.

== Ofsted ==
Ofsted visited the college between 15 and 18 November 2022 and awarded the college with a 'Good' grade with 'Outstanding' in personal development.

== Facilities ==
The college was founded in 2009 after the then Suffolk College was split into Suffolk New College, dealing with further education, and University Campus Suffolk dealing with higher education courses. In August 2009 a new building costing £70 million was created for the college. The 22,000 square metre building consists of four floors with a range of facilities surrounding a central atrium which rises to three storeys.

Facilities include a range of classrooms, workshops and other learning and support spaces. A fine dining restaurant and a deli are run by students on catering courses. The restaurant, Chefs' Whites, is open to the public. Workshops include automotive, construction and IT workshops.

Suffolk New College Sports Centre was built more recently and includes facilities such as a four court badminton sports hall and two multi-purpose rooms available for public use.

== New Facilities ==
In 2022 the college officially unveiled its new £2.4 million Tech Campus in Ipswich. The opening was made official by TV star and Jimmy's Farm owner Jimmy Doherty, whose shows include Channel 4's 'Food Unwrapped' and 'Jamie & Jimmy's Friday Night Feast', which he does with childhood friend, Jamie Oliver. Jimmy, who is a patron of the college, originally gained advice at the Suffolk Rural campus of Suffolk New College when he was starting out in farming and has maintained a link with the college ever since.

In 2022 the college was given the green light to build their four-storey health and social care block with a mock hospital.

== University of Suffolk at Suffolk New College ==
Suffolk New College is a partner college of the University of Suffolk and delivers Civil Engineering and Teacher Training programmes.

== Campuses ==
The college has campuses in Ipswich, Otley, Leiston and Halesworth

== Notable alumni ==
- Barns Courtney - musician
- Stuart Humphryes - film colouriser and photo enhancer (enrolled 1988–1991)
- Asami Zdrenka - member of girl group Neon Jungle

== See also ==
- List of tallest buildings and structures in Ipswich
