= Easton College =

Agricultural college in Norfolk, United Kingdom

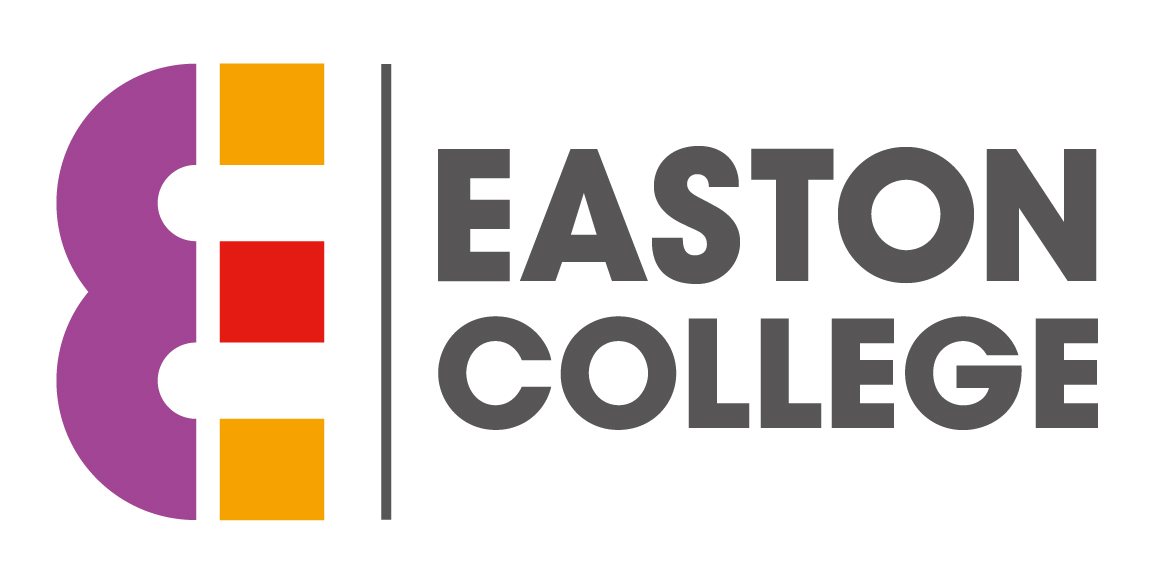
- Academic affiliation: University of East Anglia
- Principal: Jerry White
- Students: 5,000
- Undergraduates: 300
- Location: Norwich, England; 52.6446°N 1.1611°E
- Campus: Easton, Norfolk
- Website: www.easton.ac.uk

Easton College is a college of further and higher education in Norfolk, United Kingdom. It is located on a 200-hectare (490-acre) campus in the village of Easton. The college has specialist facilities for training in agriculture, horticulture, arboriculture, countryside, animal studies, and equine, alongside provision in construction, engineering, foundation learning, sport and public services. The college is part of City College Norwich, following the de-merger of Easton & Otley College in January 2020. The Otley campus became part of Suffolk New College.

== Full-time courses ==
The College offers full-time courses in the following curriculum areas:

- Agricultural Engineering
- Agriculture
- Animal Management
- Arboriculture
- Construction
- Countryside Management
- Equine Studies
- Fisheries
- Floristry
- Foundation Learning
- Gamekeeping
- Horticulture
- Motor Vehicle Engineering
- Sport
- Uniformed Public Services

== Tennis centre ==
The campus area includes also a tennis centre, Easton College Tennis Centre, consisting of 8 hard indoor tennis courts, and 4 outdoor European red clay courts.

Built with funding from the Learning and Skills Council, The Lawn Tennis Association, the Norfolk Lawn Tennis Association and the college, the project was completed in two phases. In autumn 2008 the first stage of the building project was completed when the four court air hall became operational. Once these courts were up and running the tennis programme started to develop. In early 2009, building work started on phase two of the project. This second stage was this permanent structure, including four more acrylic indoor courts, changing rooms, toilets, refreshments, offices, seminar rooms, and a viewing gallery.
