= Writtle University College =

University in Writtle, England

Coordinates: 51.7399°N 0.4146°E

- Motto: Time Tries the Truth In Everything
- Type: Public
- Active: 1893–2024
- Chancellor: Jimmy Doherty
- Administrative staff: 100+ academic/teaching 15 Research; 50+ other academic 80+ other
- Students: n/a HE (2024/25)
- Undergraduates: n/a (2024/25)
- Postgraduates: n/a (2024/25)
- Other students: 7,645 FE
- Location: Lordship Road, Writtle, Essex, CM1 3RR, Chelmsford, Essex, UK
- Colours: Scarlet and Bronze Yellow
- Website: writtle.ac.uk

Writtle University College was a university college located in Writtle near Chelmsford, Essex. It was founded in 1893 and obtained University College status in May 2016.

In July 2023, Writtle University College announced a merger with Anglia Ruskin University, and completed on 29 February 2024. ARU Writtle is one of the campuses of the university, alongside ARU Chelmsford, ARU Cambridge, ARU Peterborough, and ARU London.

Its countryside estate features a wide range of facilities, including a working farm, an equine centre, science laboratories, design studios, a canine therapy clinic, a specialist animal unit and sports provision including the UK's first permanent 3x3 basketball courts.

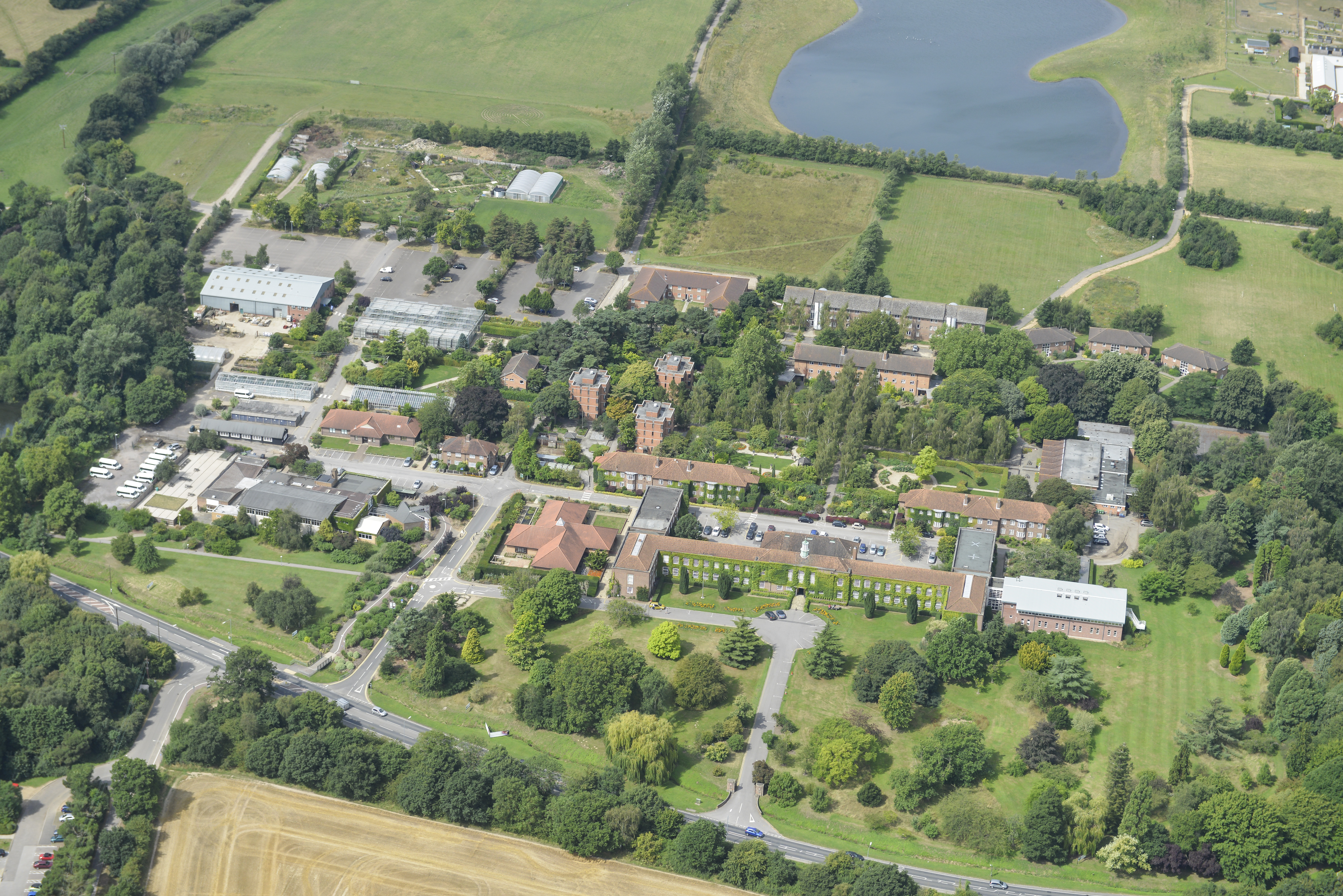
Writtle University College campus

== History ==
Established in 1893, the college was originally known as County Laboratories, teaching agriculture and horticulture and becoming the County Technical Laboratories in 1903.

In 1912 it became East Anglian Institute of Agriculture. It changed its name to Essex Institute of Agriculture, Writtle in 1939 and moved to the Writtle Estate in 1940.

In 1914, teaching temporarily halted following the outbreak of the First World War. 'Writtle College, The First Hundred Years' by Clive Beale and Geoff Owen, states that some staff left to join the armed forces while others were seconded to the War Agricultural Committee, which had taken over the institute.

During the Second World War, the Institute supported the Dig For Victory Campaign with advice on crop production, gardening, plant protection and livestock. The campus was also central to work carried out by the Women's Land Army in Essex and taught short, three week training courses.

It became Writtle Agricultural College in 1969, Writtle College in 1989 and Writtle University College in 2016.

In 2006 British artist Anne Schwegmann-Fielding installed a mosaic sculpture in the light well of the Northumberland Building foyer. Based on an aerial photograph of the college, the installation was the culmination of a 2005 Leverhulme Trust grant titled 'The Landscape of Mosaic' which also saw the development of a mosaic meadow which combined artist's source materials and wild flowers.

== Academic profile ==
The front of Writtle University College

The university college taught undergraduate and postgraduate degrees in subjects including:

- Art
- Agriculture
- Animal Science
- Animal Management
- Canine Therapy
- Equine
- Horticulture
- Sport & Exercise Science
- Veterinary Physiotherapy

Further education courses included:

- Apprenticeships
- Agriculture
- Animal Studies
- Conservation (Land and Wildlife)
- Equine
- Floristry
- Horticulture (Gardening and Landscaping)
- Sport

=== Governance ===
Stephen Waite was appointed as the Principal in Spring 2013 and became Vice-Chancellor upon the college obtaining University status. He retired in August 2017 and was succeeded by Tim Middleton.

Writtle University College was granted Taught Degree Awarding Powers (TDAP) by the Privy Council in March 2015.

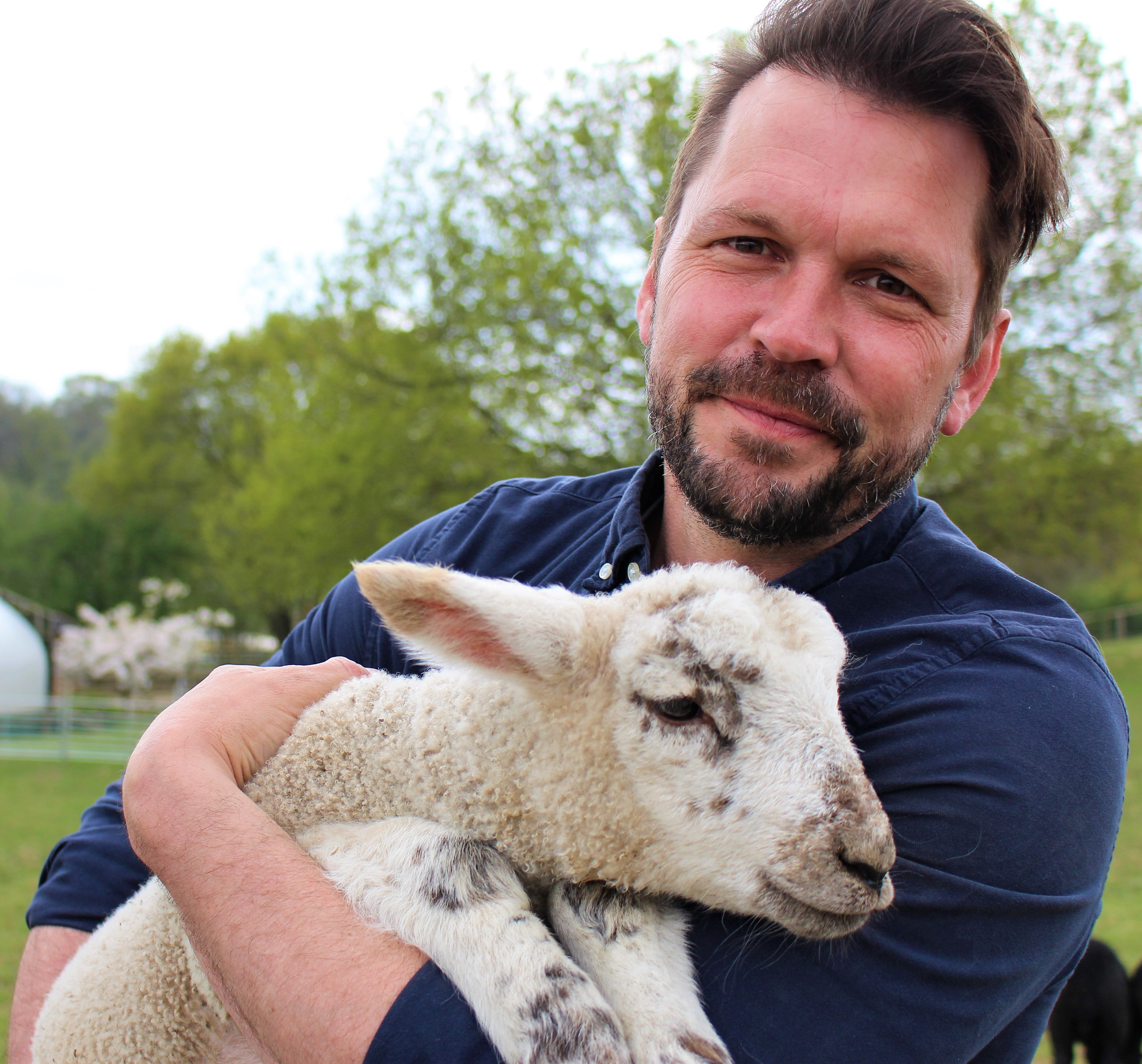
Jimmy Doherty was appointed Chancellor of Writtle University College in 2022

Baroness Jenkin of Kennington became Writtle University College's Founding Chancellor in 2016. She was succeeded by farmer and television presenter Jimmy Doherty in 2022. Celebrity gardener Alan Titchmarsh previously acted at the college's patron.

== Awards and achievements ==
- The Writtle floristry team won the Gold award at the Royal Horticultural Society Hampton Court Palace Flower Show in 2012 for their exhibition entitled "Lady of Shallot" and Silver the following year for their exhibition "Rock Around the Clock".
- The University College's further education horticulture students won a Gold award at the Royal Horticultural Society Young Gardeners of the Year competition in 2014, having previously won Silver in 2013 and 2012 and Bronze in 2011. They then won 'Best in Show', 'Gold' and 'People's Choice' awards, presented by David Domoney, at the Ideal Home Show Young Gardeners of the Year competition in 2015.
- In 2019, Writtle University College was named the British Florist Association's 'Floristry Training Provider of the Year' and University College lecturer Elaine Thackray was awarded the title 'Floristry Tutor of the Year'.
- Writtle University College received one of England's highest student satisfaction ratings in the 2020 National Student Survey, when 92% of participating students agreed with the statement: "overall, I am satisfied with the quality of the course”.

In 2021, members of the student-run Gaia Club launched a campaign to plant over 700 new trees on Writtle University College's countryside estate.

== See also ==
- Anglia Ruskin University
- Sturgeons House

== Bibliography ==
- "Writtle University College" (Official website).
