= Otley, Suffolk =

Village in Suffolk, England

Coordinates: 52.152°N 1.222°E

Otley
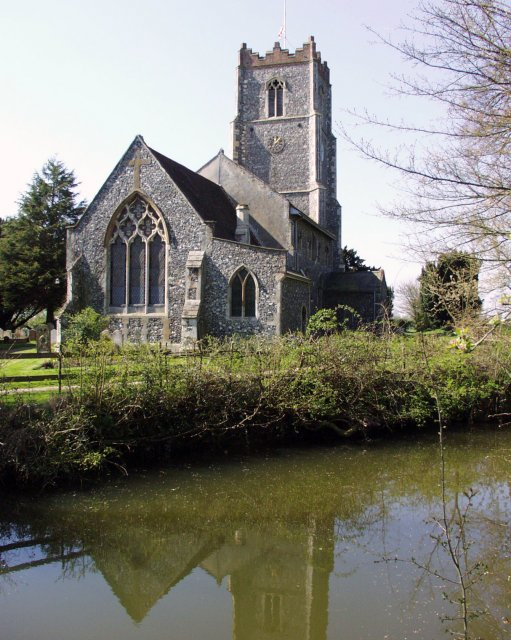
- Church of St Mary the Virgin

- Location within Suffolk
- Area: 9 km^{2} (3.5 sq mi)
- Population: 676 (2011)
  - Density: 75/km^{2} (190/sq mi)
- OS grid reference: TM204553
- Civil parish: Otley
- District: East Suffolk
- Shire county: Suffolk
- Region: East
- Country: England
- Sovereign state: United Kingdom
- Post town: Ipswich
- Postcode district: IP6
- Dialling code: 01473
- UK Parliament: Central Suffolk and North Ipswich

Otley is a village and civil parish in the East Suffolk district, in the English county of Suffolk. It is around 7 miles (11 km) north-east of Ipswich. The parish, which covers an area of about 9 square kilometres (3.5 sq mi), had a population of 676 at the 2011 United Kingdom census. The B1079 road runs through the village, meeting the B1078 to the south of the parish at Otley Green.

The village has a number of amenities, including a shop, public house, village hall, doctor’s surgery and two churches. The village primary school is small and educates around 50 pupils. In the south of the parish, Suffolk Rural College delivers a range of agricultural and other vocational courses. The college originally opened in 1970 as Otley College of Agriculture and Horticulture and became part of Ipswich-based Suffolk New College in 2020.

Otley Hall, a 15th-century Grade I listed house which was historically the seat of the family of Bartholomew Gosnold, is to the north of the village. To the south of the village is a motte and bailey castle site; a Roman road crossed the parish towards its southern boundary. The parish church is dedicated to St Mary the Virgin and dates from the 15th century. It has what is believed to be one of the oldest total immersion baptismal font in any English Anglican church. The church is a Grade II* listed building.

Otley Baptist Chapel is situated on Chapel Road and dates from 1800. The building was significantly enlarged in the 1830s, at which point it became a Strict Baptist chapel. (Note: The Strict Baptists split from the Baptist church in 1829 at Grundisburgh, which is 3 miles (4.8 km) south of Otley.) On the morning of 30 March 1851 it had a congregation of 462, over four times that of the Anglican church, with another congregation, of 562, in the afternoon. The modern chapel seats 500.

Otley is the birthplace of Roger Osborne who scored the only goal of the game in the 1978 FA Cup Final for Ipswich Town. It was also for many years, the home of Percy Edwards, famous for his impressions of birds and other animal noises.
