= Kingston Maurward College =

School in Dorchester, England

Coordinates: 50.7186°N 2.4047°W

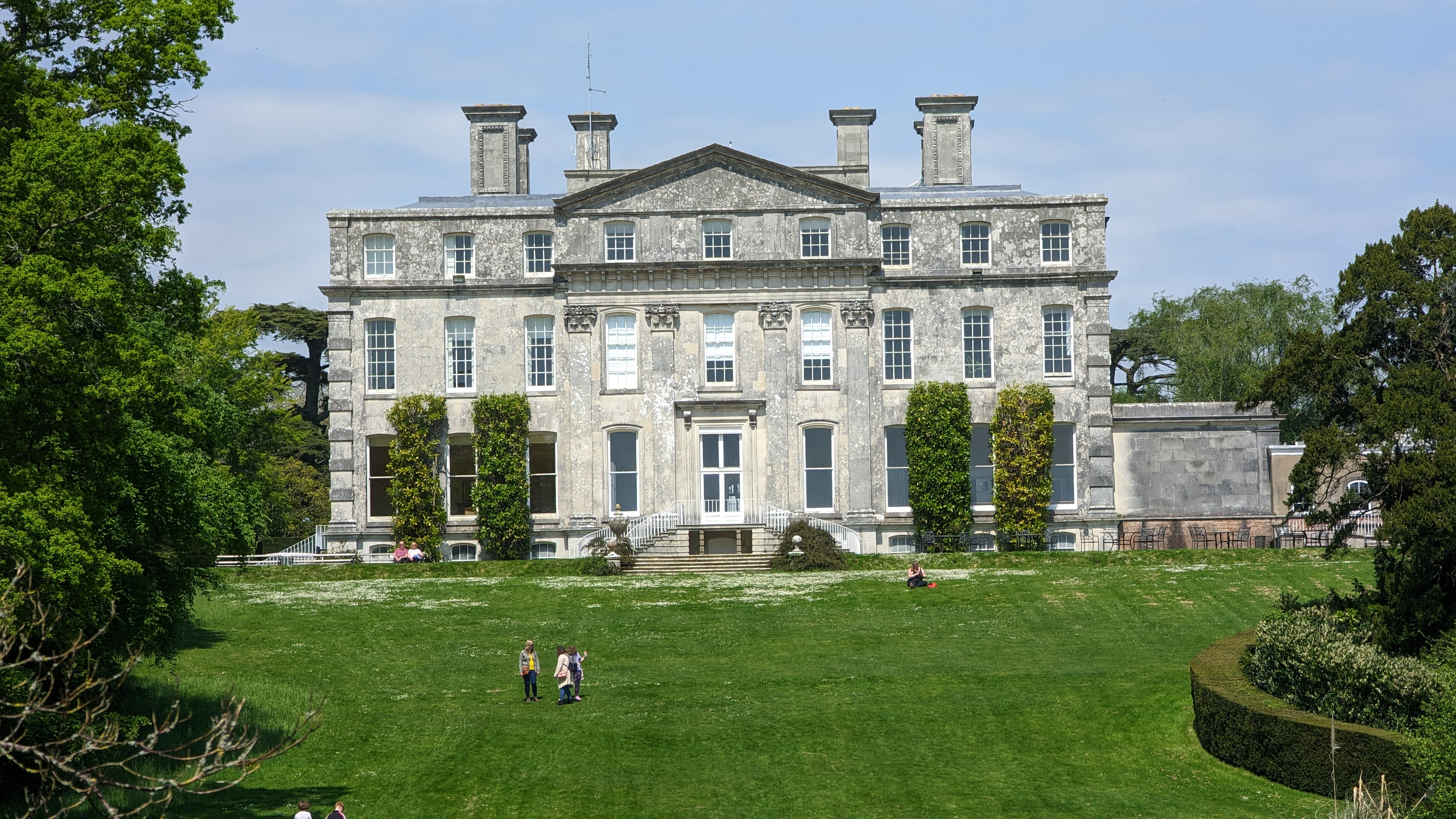
Kingston Maurward College

Kingston Maurward College is a college for land-based studies situated two miles east of Dorchester, Dorset, England. The college is a member of the Landex group, an association of institutions that provide courses in agriculture and horticulture.

Kingston Maurward House on the college grounds is used for administration purposes and private functions.

== See also ==
- Kingston Maurward House
