= Plumpton College =

College in Plumpton, England

Coordinates: 50.906°N 0.069°W

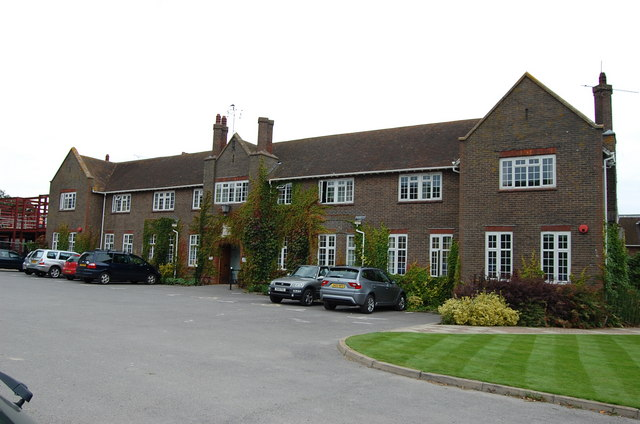

Plumpton College is a Further and Higher education college in Plumpton, East Sussex, England, with courses in a variety of land based and related subjects. The college provides a range of full-time and part-time land-based courses, FE courses to Foundation Degree and BSc courses. The college degree courses are provided in association with the University of Greenwich.

The main site of the College is in Plumpton, with satellite centres, termed 'Outcentres', elsewhere in East Sussex at Netherfield, Flimwell and Stanmer Park, and further afield in Bwlch Mwlchan, Snowdonia. The current principal of the college is Jeremy Kerswell.

The range of courses cover land-based provision including Agriculture, Horticulture, Floristry, Greenkeeping, Hard Landscaping, Equine Studies, Agricultural Engineering, Metalsmithing, Animal Management, Veterinary Nursing, Countryside Management, Forestry and Arboriculture, Adventure Education and Sport, International Wine Business, Viticulture and Oenology, and Wine Production.

The college was visited by The Princess Royal in March 2008 to open a new Children's Rural Education Centre marking the Year of Food and Farming.

== Viticulture and Oenology ==
Full courses offered are Foundation, BSc and MSc courses in Viticulture and Oenology, as well as in Wine Business, and around 180 domestic and international students attend these courses each year. It is the Centre of Excellence for the burgeoning wine industry in the UK.

Short courses include intensive courses in wine production for smaller growers and vineyard employees, known as WineSkills, a range of WSET courses, and bespoke courses and events.

The college has a 7.3ha of productive vineyard called Rocklodge Vineyard in Scaynes Hill with a newly-planted vineyard in Ditchling due to come into full production in 2021 or 2022, a semi-commercial winery, laboratories, and a sensory evaluation room. With the assistance of both a professional viticulturalist and winemaker, students have a large hand in creating the wine, sold commercially on-line and in local retail outlets

The Duchess of Cornwall visited Plumpton College to open their new Wine Research Facility on 26 March 2014.

== Alumni ==
- Anthony Rosen, farmer and advocate of large-scale farming
