= UKPASS =

UKPASS (UK Postgraduate Application and Statistical Service) was the UCAS (Universities and Colleges Admissions Service) postgraduate application service.

== Location ==
UKPASS was operated from UCAS offices in Cheltenham, Gloucestershire.

== History ==
UKPASS was offered by UCAS from 2007 to 1 June 2018.

== Application process for students ==
UKPASS offered a course search facility for all postgraduate courses in the UK, and an application service to the institutions using UKPASS. Applications could be submitted online through the UKPASS website. Applicants could make up to ten applications, with core data pre-populated from one application to the next. Applicants tracked the progress of their applications and replied to offers online.

The website gave general information about planning postgraduate study and detailed information on postgraduate finance, and many hints and links for international student applicants.

== Application process for universities and colleges ==
UKPASS offered higher education institutions an off-the-shelf application management service.

Applications for postgraduate courses were also available through other UCAS services as follows:

- Postgraduate teaching qualifications - GTTR
- Postgraduate conservatoire music courses – CUKAS
- Postgraduate social work - UCAS
