= Polytechnics Central Admissions System =

English and Welsh administrative body (1986–1992)

The Polytechnics Central Admissions System (PCAS /ˈpiːkɑːs/) was an administrative body handling admissions in England and Wales to most courses at polytechnics and some other higher education institutions for the entry years 1986 to 1992. It ran in parallel to the university admissions system, UCCA, as well as the Central Register and Clearing House, which dealt with teacher-training applications to both polytechnics and specialist teacher training colleges, and ADAR which originally handled art and design course admissions to both polytechnics and specialist art and design colleges. All these admissions systems are now united within the UCAS admissions system.

== History ==
=== Earlier organisations ===
The establishment of the teacher training admission system, the Central Register and Clearing House, in 1933, and the central admissions system for British universities, called UCCA, in 1961 had shown the benefits of a single admission system for higher education applicants. Although the polytechnics were degree-teaching institutions, through the CNAA awards system, they were not eligible for admission to UCCA as it was reserved only for universities with degree awarding powers. Despite this the Polytechnics (see Polytechnic (United Kingdom)) were involved as early as 1972 in discussions with UCCA and the Central Register and Clearing House about the possible future shape of one or more admissions systems. At this stage applicants dealt directly with each polytechnic and the polytechnics themselves were strongly regional or local in their appeal. A study in 1977 found that between sixty and seventy per cent of those admitted to a polytechnic had applied to that institution only, and that forty per cent of admissions to polytechnics resulted from applications made in August or September of the year of entry.

=== Formation ===
In 1983 the Committee of Directors of Polytechnics began negotiations with UCCA to share its computing, technical and office facilities in Cheltenham to establish a course entrance system, based on the existing model used by UCCA. A grant of £210,000, from the British Department for Education and Science, was awarded to set up a new unified admissions system, provisionally called PUCCA. However, instead of a unified system for both the universities and polytechnics a separate system for polytechnics emerged from the negotiations, modelled on UCCA, but known as PCAS. The first chairman was Harry Law of Portsmouth Polytechnic; his deputy was Keith Thompson, the Director of Staffordshire Polytechnic, who became chairman in June 1989, staying until 1993. The deputy from 1989 was Michael Goldstein, Director of Coventry Polytechnic. PCAS was at Fulton House on Jessop Avenue, near Cheltenham Waitrose. Also in the building was ECCTIS 2000 and UCCA, and it is now called Festival House.

The PCAS name was chosen as the Department for Education and Science grant was conditional upon the new scheme being made available for applications to Colleges of Higher Education later on. It was thought that the PCAS acronym could remain if the organization's name needed to be changed to Polytechnics' & Colleges' Admissions Service.

Applicants to courses were given the option to apply separately for universities or polytechnics, or for both.

The PCAS system came into effect in 1985. It was led by its first Chief Executive, Tony Higgins, later chief executive of UCAS from 1993, and in the first year it handled around 140,000 applications to polytechnic courses, of whom 40,000 a year went on to study at polytechnics.

Although many polytechnics offered art and design programmes, and some also offered teacher training courses, these admissions systems remained outside PCAS.

=== Merger ===
UCCA and PCAS merged their form in 1992, whereby PCAS sorted postal applications, and UCCA ran the computer, then both merged in 1993.

== Merger with University Admissions System ==
Although the aim to create a unified application system for universities and polytechnics was not achieved in 1985, the Chief Executive of PCAS, Tony Higgins, continued to push for the merger of PCAS with UCCA. In 1992, following the change of status and name of most polytechnics to universities, the two bodies did combine under Higgins's leadership. Initially the application form was branded jointly UCCA/PCAS, but in 1994 the new merged body was renamed UCAS.
