= Edward Britton =

Sir Edward Louis Britton CBE (4 December 1909 – 3 January 2005) was a British trade union leader.

Britton studied at Bromley Grammar School and Trinity College, Cambridge, where he edited the Cambridge Review. On graduating, he was unemployed for six months. He found work as a teacher, and immediately joined the National Union of Teachers (NUT). He was exempted from military service during World War II due to his asthma. In 1951, he became head of Warlingham School in Surrey, then in 1956 became national president of the NUT.

In 1960 Britton was recruited as General Secretary of the Association of Teachers in Technical Institutions, during which time he worked with Reg Prentice to challenge the outcome of the Robbins Committee, and successfully lobbied for the opening of polytechnics. He resigned his post in 1969, in order to become General Secretary of the NUT, which he immediately convinced to affiliate to the Trades Union Congress. In 1974, he won a 30% pay increase for teachers. He retired in 1975, becoming a lecturer at the University of Sheffield, and also worked at Canterbury Christ Church College and served on Acas' central committee.

Trade union offices
Preceded by Herbert J. Nursey	President of the National Union of Teachers; 1956–1957	Succeeded by John Archbold
Preceded by Ernest Arthur Seeley	General Secretary of the Association of Teachers in Technical Institutions; 1960–1969	Succeeded by Tom Driver
Preceded by Sir Ronald Gould	General Secretary of National Union of Teachers; 1970–1975	Succeeded by Fred Jarvis
