= Anthony Higgins =

Anthony or Tony Higgins may refer to:

- Anthony Higgins (politician) (1840–1912), American lawyer and politician
- Anthony Higgins (actor) (born 1947), English actor
- Tony Higgins (footballer) (born 1954), Scottish footballer
- Tony Higgins (university executive) (1944–2004), English university worker, chief executive of UCAS

== See also ==
- David Anthony Higgins (born 1961), American actor
- Jarad Anthony Higgins (1998–2019), American rapper known professionally as Juice WRLD
