= AHF =

AHF may refer to:

- AIDS Healthcare Foundation, a nonprofit provider of HIV prevention services, testing, and healthcare for HIV patients
- Allgermanische Heidnische Front, an international neo-Nazi organisation, active during the late 1990s and early 2000s
- American Himalayan Foundation, a US nonprofit organization that helps improve the ecology and living conditions in the Himalayas
- Argentine hemorrhagic fever or mal de los rastrojos, an infectious disease occurring in Argentina
- Asian Handball Federation, a Continental Sports Federation of handball
- Asian Hockey Federation, a Continental Sports Federation of field hockey
- Atomic Heritage Foundation, a US nonprofit organization dedicated to the preservation and interpretation of the Manhattan Project and the Atomic Age
- Azerbaijan Handball Federation

== See also ==
- Adult human female (disambiguation)
