= Sally Hunt =

British trade union leader

Sally Colette Hunt OBE (born 1964) is a British trade union leader, the General Secretary of the Association of University Teachers until its merger into the new University and College Union (UCU), of which Hunt was the General Secretary until 2019.

== Biography ==
Born in 1964 in Germany, where her father was teaching in a British forces school, Hunt was educated at a comprehensive school in Chippenham, Wiltshire. She studied international relations at the University of Sussex from 1983 until 1987, serving as vice-president of the students' union.

After leaving university, she worked as a nightclub bouncer, a bookshop assistant, and for two building society staff associations before joining the Association of University Teachers.

Hunt was the last General Secretary of the Association of University Teachers (AUT), having held that post since 2002. On 1 June 2006, the AUT merged with the National Association of Teachers in Further and Higher Education (NATFHE) to form the UCU.

As head of the AUT, she and Paul Mackney (Head of NATFHE), led industrial action, over three years until 2006, in support of a pay rise for higher education staff exceeding 20%. The actions disrupted university exams and provision of marks across the UK. In the end, members voted heavily in favour of accepting a rise of 13.1% phased over the three years, with the final year's figure subject to further increase in line with inflation. The final year's figure was to be "2.5% or RPI, whichever is greater". In the end, the RPI was at its peak and was 5%, resulting in that being the level of the final year's pay rise.

Hunt also oversaw what appear to have been the biggest strikes in UK higher education history, the 2018 UK higher education strike.

Hunt was elected as the first General Secretary of UCU on 9 March 2007, narrowly beating main challenger Roger Kline (ex-NATFHE, and UCU Head of Equalities) by some 1346 votes after the second preference votes of third candidate Peter Jones were allocated after Jones was eliminated in an inconclusive first round. The election turnout was 13.9% out of an electorate of just over 116,000 UCU Members. She was re-elected on 2 March 2012, defeating her only opponent, Mark Campbell (ex-NATFHE, the chair of the UCU Co-ordinating Committee at London Metropolitan University and a member of the National Executive Council of UCU since 2008) by a 73% to 27% margin (or 6835 votes); Campbell was supported by the UCU Left. The turnout was 12.5% out of an electorate of 117,918. Hunt is the UCU representative to the TUC and a member of the TUC General Council. Her first union job was as a senior research officer with the union later known as ACCORD. Hunt was once more re-elected on 2 March 2017: 13.7% of members turned out, casting 13,724 votes, with 8,138 for Hunt and 5,586 for her contender Jo McNeill.

She is married, has a daughter, and lives in Brighton.

On 25 February 2019, UCU announced that Hunt had resigned from the post of General Secretary on health grounds after having been awarded a £400,000 'post employment payment' pay-off.

She was appointed Officer of the Order of the British Empire (OBE) in the 2022 New Year Honours for services to industrial relations.

== See also ==
- United Kingdom labour law
- United Kingdom enterprise law

== Notes ==
Trade union offices
Preceded by David Triesman	General Secretary of the Association of University Teachers; 2002–2006	Succeeded by Position abolished
Preceded by New position	General Secretary of the University and College Union; 2006–2019 with Paul Mackney 2006-2007	Succeeded by Jo Grady
Preceded by Mary Bousted	President of the Trades Union Congress; 2017–2018	Succeeded by Mark Serwotka
