= Paul Mackney =

British educator and trade union leader (born 1950)

Paul Mackney (born 25 March 1950) is a British educator and trade union leader. From 1997 to 2006, he was General Secretary of the National Association of Teachers in Further and Higher Education (NATFHE). NATFHE merged with the Association of University Teachers (AUT) in 2006 to form the University and College Union, at which time Mackney was elected Joint general secretary (serving alongside Sally Hunt). He retired from union service in May 2007. He then worked part-time as an Associate Director of the National Institute of Adult Continuing Education (NIACE) until May 2009 when he took ill-health retirement.

== Early life ==
Mackney's father was a Landsburyite socialist evangelical vicar in the Church of England and his mother was a Christian Socialist. His parents deeply impressed the importance of racial equality and social justice on him as a child. Mackney attended Christ's Hospital boarding school. He trained briefly to become a probation officer, but ended up graduating with a bachelor's degree in politics from the University of Exeter. During his time in college, he joined the International Socialists and became active in campaigns to strengthen the rights of the unemployed and those on public assistance. Later expelled from the International Socialists, he joined the Workers' League before becoming a member of the Labour Party.

Mackney taught English in Hamburg, Germany, before returning England. He was a part-time lecturer in social studies at Poole Technical College in Poole, Dorset (where he joined ATTI which after merging with the ATCDE became NATFHE), before taking a full time position at Hall Green Technical College in Birmingham in 1975. From 1975 to 1992, Mackney taught about trade union issues in further education.

Mackney received a master's degree in industrial relations from University of Warwick in 1986. His dissertation topic was the 1984–1985 miners' strike.

== Union career ==
Mackney was elected as the NATFHE representative to the Birmingham Trades Council in the late 1970s, eventually becoming Vice-President and President. He pushed for establishment of the Birmingham Trade Union Resource Centre, and from 1986 to 1992 was Head of the Birmingham Trade Union Studies Centre in Floodgate Street, Digbeth.

Mackney was appointed a Regional Official for NATFHE in the West Midlands in 1992, and elected General Secretary of the union in 1997. Mackney discovered the union was nearly £1 million in debt, the National Executive Committee was deeply splintered, the staff morale low, and the organisation drifting. He slashed costs and laid off staff, but also won the loyalty of the NEC and staff for his vision and leadership. He reinvigorated the 67,000-member trade union to such an extent that he was re-elected to an unprecedented second term in 2002.

Mackney worked to improve the effectiveness and strength of NATFHE by seeking a merger of the trade union with the Association of University Teachers. Merger of the two unions occurred in 2006. Mackney was elected Joint general secretary along with AUT leader Sally Hunt. The new trade union represented about 120,000 academics and academic-related staff in further and higher education throughout the United Kingdom.

Mackney suffered a severe heart attack in 2005. After an extensive recovery, he declined to run for the position of General Secretary of the UCU and retired from active union life.

Mackney has been involved in larger trade union issues as well. In 1999, Trades Union Congress (TUC) general secretary John Monks appointed him to his first Task Group looking at the implications of the Stephen Lawrence report for trade unions. In September 2002, Mackney became the first NATFHE general secretary ever elected to the TUC General Council. Mackney became a founding member of a caucus on the TUC General Council known as "Fed Up With Losing." The caucus, which included Billy Hayes, Jeremy Dear, Mick Rix, Mark Serwotka, and Bob Crow among others, argued for a much more aggressive and militant labour movement which would push the Labour Party in a more leftist direction and begin to challenge the lingering effects of Thatcherism. The media began calling the group the Awkward Squad.

== Political activity ==
Mackney is a lifelong opponent of racism and fascism. He has been involved in anti-racism activities since his youth. As a trade union leader, he pushed for establishment of the Commission for Black Staff in Further Education and has attacked discrimination against staff and faculty as well as societal racism which prevents students from obtaining jobs upon graduation. Mackney has also vocally opposed the British National Party and other organised and unorganised forms of fascism in British society. The offices of the Unite Against Fascism Campaign, backed by over 20 trade unions, were located in the NATFHE building in Britannia Street, Kings Cross.

He is also a strong supporter of Palestinian independence. However, in 2006, Mackney opposed a NATFHE resolution supporting a boycott of Israeli institutions of higher education.

Mackney was also an early and strong opponent of the Iraq War. He has spoken out angrily about British involvement in the war, and condemned the government for its continued involvement in the continuing military occupation of Iraq. The offices of the Stop the War Campaign, which organised the biggest British demonstration in labour history, were located in the NATFHE building in Britannia Street, Kings Cross.

In July 2015, Mackney endorsed Jeremy Corbyn's campaign in the Labour Party leadership election.

== Notes ==
Trade union offices
Preceded by John Akker	General Secretary of NATFHE; 1997–2006	Succeeded by Position abolished
Preceded by New position	General Secretary of the University and College Union; 2006–2007 with Sally Hunt	Succeeded by Sally Hunt
