= Association of Teachers in Colleges and Departments of Education =

United Kingdom teacher association

The Association of Teachers in Colleges and Departments of Education (ATCDE) was an organisation dedicated to the training and education of teachers in the United Kingdom, as well as the representation of members in the negotiation of bargaining issues.

== History ==
The formal training of teachers in England began on a small scale with Borough Road College, London, around 1798, and developed slowly for the next hundred years. During the final two decades of the nineteenth century, many professional bodies emerged and grew quickly. This, together with the government's decision in 1890 to expand the number of colleges available to non-residential students, is believed to be the impetus for founding the association for the employees of such colleges in 1891. This was the direct forerunner of the ATCDE.

ATCDE was founded in 1943 and merged the Training Colleges Association and the Council of Principals. ATCDE membership was principally drawn from teacher training colleges and university education departments.

One of ATCDE's subsidiary roles was to supply information concerning the admissions process, involving the Central Register and Clearing House and the Graduate Teacher Training Registry.

In comparison with other education unions, the ATCDE was small in size, having some 5,000 members in 1967 and peaking at 7,000 in 1972–3.

Serious reductions in teacher training provision occurred during the early 1970s. It was forecasted that between 1974 and 1981 the number of institutions would fall from 159 to 75, and the number of students from 117,000 to 43,770.

In 1976, ATCDE merged with the Association of Teachers in Technical Institutions (ATTI) to form the National Association of Teachers in Further and Higher Education. Following further amalgamations, NATFHE merged with the University and College Union.

== Influence ==
The ATCDE has been called "hugely influential". It published reports relating to education policy.

== Presidents of the ATCDE ==
- 1943 Dr Helen Woodhouse
- 1946 Mr A E Dean
- 1955 Dr G B Jeffrey
- 1957 Miss D Dymond
- 1960 Sir Charles Morris
- 1963 Dr F A Vick
- 1973 Sir Derman Christopher
