= Steve Wharton =

British academic

Steve Wharton is Chair of Governors of Badminton School, Chair of the Governance, Delivery and People Committee of Education Support, a Trustee of the Reform Club, and Chair of the Reform Club Conservation Charitable Trust.

Between October 1990 and July 2026 he worked at the University of Bath's Department of Politics, Language and International Studies, and was Associate Professor of French and Communication at the time of his retirement. He was appointed to a consultancy role as Bath's Interim Head of Governance from mid-February to the end of July 2019.

After primary school education at Wimborne St Giles followed by Cranborne Middle School and Queen Eizabeth's School, Wimborne Minster, Wharton read French and German at Aston University before remaining there for his PhD. First appointed to a lectureship in French Studies at the University of Manchester, Wharton moved in 1990 to Bath until his retirement in July 2026. Between 2000 and 2008 he served on the National Executive of both the Association of University Teachers (AUT) and the University and College Union (UCU) which was formed through the AUT's merger with Natfhe in 2006; he was the last AUT President (2005/06) and first joint President of UCU (2006/07). Between 2016 and 2020 he served on the Board of the Universities Superannuation Scheme (USS).

In 2012 the French Government made him Chevalier dans l’Ordre des Palmes Académiques for services to French Culture.

December 2022 saw him appointed to the Board of Education Support. He has served as Chair of its Governance, Delivery and People Committee since September 2025, having been appointed to the Committee upon joining the Board.

He became Chair of the Board of Governors of Badminton School on 01 September 2025, having joined the Board in September 2023 and served as the Chair of its Education & Welfare sub-committee.

He is the author of Screening Reality: French Documentary Film during the German Occupation. Oxford: Lang, 2006. ISBN 9780820468822.
