= Paul Embery =

Political commentator

- Occupations: Political commentator; Author; Firefighter; Trade unionist

Paul Embery is a British author, political commentator, and trade union activist. He has worked as a columnist for UnHerd and Huffington Post, and has hosted The Political Correction segment of GB News. Embery is a member of the Blue Labour campaign movement.

== Biography ==
Embery was born and raised in Dagenham. He served as a firefighter with the London Fire Brigade and was on the executive council of the Fire Brigades Union (FBU), serving as the regional secretary of the Fire Brigades Union in London. He became a member of the Labour Party in 1994.

In March 2019, Embery spoke at the pro-Brexit Leave Means Leave rally in London. As a result, he was dismissed from his role from the Fire Brigades Union and barred from being a Fire Brigades Union official for two years as the FBU stated Embery's decision to speak at the rally violated their anti-Brexit policy. The decision was criticised by politicians Kate Hoey and Jon Cruddas. In August 2021, it was ruled that Embery had been unfairly dismissed from his position. In April 2023, this decision was overturned at the Employment Appeals Tribunal on the grounds that as an elected lay official, Embery was not an employee of the Union.

In 2020, Embery published Despised: Why the Modern Left Loathes the Working Class..

In May 2023, Jo Grady, the General Secretary of the University and College Union, agreed to pay "substantial damages" to Embery after he sued her for libel. This followed tweets from Grady, in response to Embery highlighting the anti-social behaviour of a group of women on a train, that Embery said falsely portrayed him as "a misogynist, a pervert and a liar".
