= David Triesman, Baron Triesman =

British Labour politician and merchant banker (1943–2026)

The Right Honourable The Lord Triesman
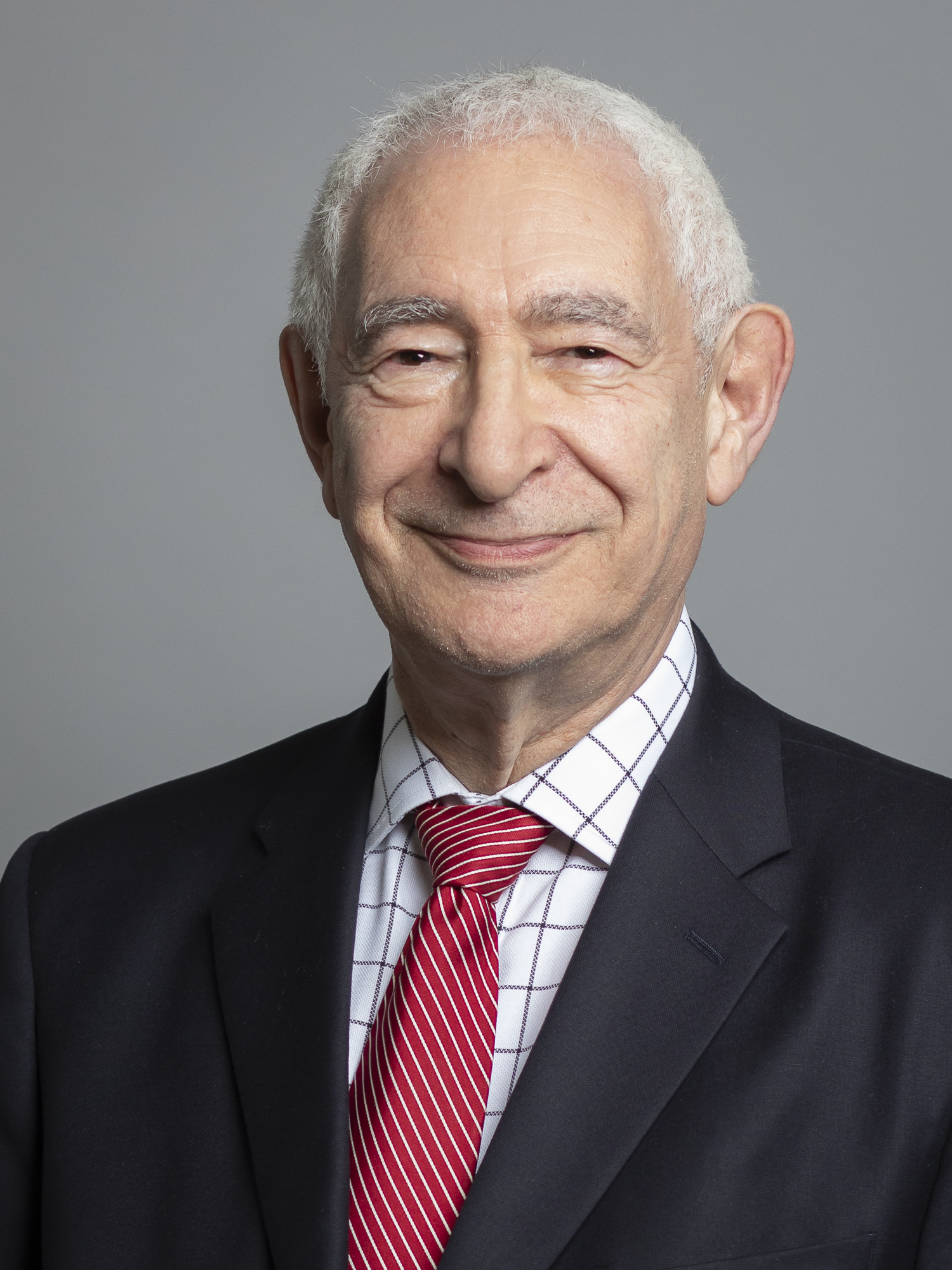
- Official portrait, 2020

Parliamentary Under-Secretary of State for Intellectual Property and Quality
- In office 29 June 2007 – 25 January 2008
- Prime Minister: Gordon Brown
- Preceded by: Bill Rammell
- Succeeded by: David Lammy

Parliamentary Under-Secretary of State for Foreign and Commonwealth Affairs
- In office 10 May 2005 – 28 June 2007
- Prime Minister: Tony Blair
- Preceded by: Chris Mullin
- Succeeded by: Meg Munn

Member of the House of Lords
- Lord Temporal
- Life peerage 9 January 2004 – 30 January 2026

General Secretary of the Labour Party
- In office 24 July 2001 – 16 December 2003
- Leader: Tony Blair
- Preceded by: Margaret McDonagh
- Succeeded by: Matt Carter

General Secretary of the Association of University Teachers
- In office 1993–2001
- Preceded by: Diana Warwick
- Succeeded by: Sally Hunt

Personal details
- Born: David Maxim Triesman; 30 October 1943 Hitchin, Hertfordshire, England
- Died: 30 January 2026 (aged 82)
- Party: Labour Party (1959–1970, 1976–2019, 2020–2026)
- Other political affiliations: Independent (2019–2020); Communist Party of Great Britain (1970–1976)
- Spouse: Lucy Hooberman
- Children: 1 child
- Education: University of Essex, King's College, Cambridge
- Occupation: Academic, trade unionist, merchant banker, politician
- Profession: Economist
- Awards: Hon Doctorates, etc: University of Northamptonshire, London South Bank University, University of Essex, Icebreaker Award for China-UK Relations

David Maxim Triesman, Baron Triesman (30 October 1943 – 30 January 2026) was a British politician, merchant banker and trade union leader.

Triesman was a Labour member of the House of Lords, sitting as a Labour peer until resigning the whip in July 2019, having previously been a minister in the Department for Innovation, Universities and Skills and Foreign and Commonwealth Office. He then sat as cross-bench (non-affiliated) peer in the House of Lords until 2020 when he rejoined Labour. Triesman was chairman of the Football Association from 2008 to 2010.

== Background ==
Triesman (named Maxim after Maxim Gorky, the Russian author, whom his mother admired) was born into a North London Jewish community. He was the son of Michael Triesman, an advertising manager and wartime aircraft inspector of Belarusian and Latvian descent, and Rita Triesman (née Lubran) of French descent. His parents were active Communists.

He was educated at the Stationers' Company's School in London, before going to the University of Essex and subsequently King's College, Cambridge.

At Essex University, Triesman and a group of fellow students seized control declaring it a 'free university'. He was subsequently suspended from Essex in 1968 after interrupting a meeting addressed by a defence industry scientist but readmitted after two weeks.

Triesman was a Senior Network Member at the European Leadership Network (ELN).

== Business career ==
Triesman was involved in business in real estate, banking, publishing and fine art. He was chairman and a shareholder of Triesman Associates, an investment company in private equity and finance businesses. Triesman was a senior advisor to strategic investment firm Salamanca Group and was an executive board member of the Salamanca Group and its subsidiaries. He was chairman of Wildfox Resorts, which is developing a resort in the Afan Valley.

He served on the boards and advisory boards of several companies including chairing Victoria Management, the advisory board of UBS and Templewood Merchant Bank and some of its subsidiaries. Triesman was a director of Havin Bank (Havana International Bank), One Ocean Enterprises, Funding Affordable Homes (and its Housing Association).

== Politics and union career ==
In 1959, aged 16, Triesman became a member of the Labour Party but eleven years later resigned and joined the Communist Party where he remained for six years, following which he rejoined the Labour Party. He was an ex-Maoist.

For a number of years, he was a lecturer and research director at South Bank Polytechnic (now London South Bank University) and held roles in the lecturers' union, NATFHE. Triesman became a full-time union official of NATFHE in 1984, with the post of National Negotiating Secretary. He was also General Secretary of the Association of University Teachers from 1993 until 2001.

Triesman then was appointed the General Secretary of the Labour Party from 2001 to December 2003, where a significant part of his job was to maintain the support of the trade unions who had become disillusioned with Tony Blair's government.

He was created a life peer on 9 January 2004, taking the title Baron Triesman, of Tottenham in the London Borough of Haringey, prior to which he was elected a Visiting Fellow of Wolfson College, Cambridge in 2000, for the study of economics and Higher Education. He has published a number of academic papers in economics and epidemiology. He was a senior visiting fellow at the University of Warwick and a visiting fellow at the London School of Economics. Triesman was a Fellow of the Royal Statistical Society and the Royal Society of Arts. In 2015, he was awarded the Icebreaker Award by the Chinese Ambassador to the UK for services to Chinese-UK relations, including football.

Triesman served as HM Opposition (Labour) Lords Shadow Spokesperson for Foreign and Commonwealth Affairs from 2010 to 2014.

He was a member of the Henry Jackson Society's Political Council, and a member of the European Leadership Network Board and Top Level Group.

Triesman resigned from the Labour group in the House of Lords in July 2019 in protest at the party leadership's behaviour and policies with regard to antisemitism in the party, Brexit and defence.

He rejoined the Labour Party in February 2020.

=== Government office ===
Under Tony Blair's third Labour administration, Triesman served as Parliamentary Under-Secretary in the Foreign and Commonwealth Office with responsibility for relations with Africa, Latin America, the Caribbean, Overseas Territories, the Commonwealth, UK visas, migration policy working directly to the prime minister, consular policy, the British Council, the BBC World Service and the Chevening Scholarships Scheme. During this period, he conducted negotiations with Iran to secure the release of a group of British naval and marine personnel who had been taken prisoner in the Upper Persian Gulf. In the reshuffle of 29 June 2007, he was moved to the newly created post of Parliamentary Under-Secretary of the Department for Innovation, Universities and Skills. In this role, he had responsibility for quality in higher education, innovation and intellectual property and future planning. In 2004, he was appointed a Lord in Waiting. He was a member of the European Affairs External Affairs Select Committee. He was chairman of the Design Commission. He was co-chairman of the All Party St Lucia Group and a member of the All Party China and Chinese in Britain Group.

== Football administration ==
A longtime fan of Tottenham Hotspur and patron of the club's charitable Foundation, Triesman became the first independent Chairman of the Football Association in January 2008. He resigned in May 2010. Triesman was a board member at Wembley National Stadium, the Premier League shareholders' meeting, the Football Foundation, and was a qualified senior football referee.

In February 2011 he testified before a parliamentary committee on the state of the administration of English football. He was heavily critical of the FA, saying it was shying away from governing the game. He was especially damning of the FA's administrative procedures and its working relationship with other football bodies, in particular the Premier League.

== Comments about FIFA bribery allegations ==
On 16 May 2010, the Mail on Sunday revealed Lord Triesman made comments about alleged bribery attempts by Spain and Russia of referees in the 2010 FIFA World Cup. Triesman asserted, "There's some evidence that the Spanish football authorities are trying to identify the referees ... and pay them." It was announced that he was to "quit" both the FA and England's 2018 bid. On 10 May 2011, Triesman, speaking before a British parliamentary select committee, affirmed his suspicions of bribery concerning four FIFA members, claiming that they sought bribes in return for backing England's failed 2018 World Cup bid.

== Personal life and death ==
Triesman spent many years in a relationship with the writer and critic Michelene Wandor until they split up in the late 1990s. He married Lucy Hooberman in 2004 and has an adopted child.

Triesman died at home on 30 January 2026, at the age of 82.

== See also ==
- List of Jews in sports (non-players)

Political offices
Preceded by Bill Rammell	Parliamentary Under-Secretary of State; 2005–2008	Succeeded by David Lammy
Party political offices
Preceded by Margaret McDonagh	General Secretary of the Labour Party; 2001–2003	Succeeded by Matt Carter
Trade union offices
Preceded by Diana Warwick	General Secretary of the Association of University Teachers; 1993–2001	Succeeded by Sally Hunt
