= Tom Driver =

Tom Driver may refer to:

- Tom Driver (trade unionist), British trade unionist
- Tom F. Driver, American theologian, author and peace activist
