= Universities' Statistical Record =

In the United Kingdom, the Universities' Statistical Record (USR) consists of records of undergraduate students on courses of one academic year or more; postgraduate students on courses of one academic year or more; academic and related staff holding regular salaried appointments, and finance data for all UK universities. It was compiled by UCCA, the Universities Central Council on Admissions from its formation in 1961 until its merger with PCAS (Polytechnics Central Admissions Service) to form UCAS in 1993.

The Higher Education Statistics Agency (HESA) became the official agency for the collection, analysis and dissemination of quantitative information about higher education in 1993. It was set up by agreement between the relevant government departments, the higher education funding councils and the universities and colleges in 1993, following the white paper “Higher Education: a new framework”, which called for more coherence in HE statistics, and the Further and Higher Education Act 1992, which established an integrated higher education system throughout the United Kingdom.

== Main topics ==
Finance: income and expenditure; university; cost centre. The Finance dataset contains details of income and expenditure for all of the UK universities. These data are contained in a series of files for each year.

Student load: undergraduate, postgraduate (taught course or research); cost centre.

== Coverage ==
- Time period covered: 1964–1993
- Country: United Kingdom

== Methodology ==
The finance data were collected from annual returns based on the university financial year (August to July).

Method of data collection: Annual returns from each university were collated by UCCA.
