= Tony Higgins (university executive) =

Michael Anthony Higgins (24 June 1944 - 16 April 2004) was an English university worker, and the first chief executive of UCAS in 1993.

== Early life ==
He attended a boys' grammar school in Leicester, then studied modern languages at Newcastle University.

== Career ==
He worked as a registrar at the University of Leicester from 1967 to 1978. He was a registrar at Loughborough University from 1979 to 1984.

=== PCAS ===
He was the chief executive of PCAS from 1984 to 1993; from the start to the end. PCAS was set up as a limited company and charity in 1984, with £625,000 by the Committee of Directors of Polytechnics. It started operating in September 1985.

He was the first employee of PCAS, and largely established the whole organisation from scratch. The first polytechnics had started in 1963, and were funded by the Polytechnics and Colleges Funding Council.

Philip Oakley had been the head of UCCA from 1 August 1985. PCAS took 118,143 applications by the 15 December 1985 closing date, with 5,795 of those being overseas applications.

PCAS did not cover Art and Design courses in its first year. PCAS ran its data on the UCCA computer, and students could apply for four courses, with a £5 fee. He took part on Woman's Hour on Thursday 20 August 1987.

=== UCAS ===
He was chief executive of UCAS from 1993 to 2003. He was joint chief in 1993 for one year, and how UCAS operates today was begun by him.

He retired in July 2003. Anthony McClaran had been deputy chief executive since 1996, and replaced him on 15 December 2003.

== Personal life ==
He played rugby for Leicester Rugby Club 2nd XV, where he got to know the Irish businessman Sir Tony O'Reilly. He lived in the north of Cheltenham.

He married in 1969, and had son and a daughter. He divorced in 1978 and remarried in 1978. He died before his father, who was a headteacher. His funeral in north-west Leicester was held at 3pm on Tuesday 27 April 2004.
