= Robert Douglas Laurie =

English-born trade unionist (1874–1953)

(Robert) Douglas Laurie (27 October 1874 – 17 April 1953) was the founder and first president of the Association of University Teachers.

== Career ==
He was born in Birkenhead and educated at Birkenhead School. He took a job in a bank until 1899 before resuming his studies at Liverpool University before gaining a third class degree in zoology from Merton College, Oxford. After working as a demonstrator and assistant lecturer in the department of comparative anatomy at Oxford, he moved back to the University of Liverpool in 1906 also as a demonstrator and assistant lecturer. From 1911, he also lectured in embryology and genetics. During the First World War, he served as a captain in the Royal Army Medical Corps, and was twice mentioned in despatches. In 1918, he moved to the University College of Wales, Aberystwyth, where he became head of the Department of Zoology. When funds became available for a chair in zoology in 1922, he became professor. He was a keen field naturalist and his research interests included the study of the fauna of the sea-floor of Cardigan Bay.

He married Elinor Beatrice Ord in 1912. They had one daughter, Eleanor Mary Ord Laurie.

== Association of University Teachers ==
Laurie called a meeting in 1909 "To consider a proposal to form an Association for bringing together the members of the Junior Staff more into touch with one another and with the life of the University". Originally it was aimed at making contacts with other lecturers in other departments and other universities. At this time an increasing number of non-professorial staff were being employed. These Junior Staff or Assistant Lecturers were poorly paid, did essentially the same duties as professors and had few promotion prospects. In addition, they had no representation on the bodies governing the Universities. Although the society formed at Liverpool was formally a "dining and discussion society" from an early stage, it was clearly a new pressure group.

At first, its aims were local and in 1910 it won a campaign over representation on the faculties but on learning that similar groups had been formed or were in the process of formation, they invited representatives of the junior staff from Bristol, Sheffield, Birmingham, Cardiff and Manchester for a dinner. In 1913, the junior staff at the Victoria University of Manchester (now the University of Manchester) presented a request for improvements in pay and grading to their university council. This included a suggestion that the starting pay should be substantially increased. The Council replied that while it agreed that eventually there should be an increase, at the current time, there was insufficient money to pay for this.

By 1917, inflation had rapidly eroded the value of salaries, and Douglas Laurie called a meeting on 15 December 1917 to draw up a memorandum to present to the Board of Education. Almost as an afterthought, he invited representatives of assistant lecturers from all universities. The meeting was attended by delegates from 15 institutions. The issues raised by the memorandum drafted at the meeting included: pay; tenure; status; grading; opportunities for research and superannuation. Finally, a motion was passed to a new association with the name "The Association of University Lecturers". The name (which implicitly excluded professors from membership) caused some dissent but a split was prevented. However, the Scottish lecturers went their own way and formed a separate association in 1922, which later merged with AUT in 1949 but retained some of its autonomy.

The issue of pensions brought the idea of professional unity to the fore. The pension scheme for lecturers was to be left out of the new teachers' pension fund formed by the Teachers' (Superannuation) Act 1918. As pension funds affect staff at various stages of their careers, this created pressure for the association to include professors. At a conference in Bristol, 27–28 June 1919, professorial delegates were present.

The name of the new Association was left until all other matters were decided. Speaking from the chair, Laurie pointed out that "the idea which brought the Association into being was of a trade union character, but expressed the hope that, when material conditions had been satisfactorily improved, educational matters generally would form the essential points on which discussion would take place".

In the end, it was agreed that the new association's objectives would be"the advancement of University Education and Research and the promotion of common action among University teachers in connection therewith" with membership open to professors. Finally, the name Association of University Teachers was voted for nem con (no votes against but some abstentions) and Douglas Laurie was elected as the first president. He retired from teaching in 1940, but he became honorary secretary of the International Association of University Professors and Lecturers (IAUPL) in 1943.

Although he served as president of the AUT for only one year, Laurie served as honorary general secretary for the rest of his life, running the association almost single-handedly until he died in April 1953 while attending a meeting of IAUPL in Amsterdam.

== Publications ==
- Anomura, TLS 19, 1926 p121–67
- Position of biology in school curriculum, Report for Leeds Meeting of the British Association for Advancement of Science, 1927
- Report on Marine and Fresh Water Investigations, Department of Zoology, University College of Wales, 1927
- (with TC James) Report on the River Twymyn, Ministry of Agriculture and Fisheries Report 324, 1931
- (with TC James) River Teifi, Ministry of Agriculture and Fisheries Standing Committee on River Pollution. Ser.No. 485 Report 326
- (with JRE Jones) Faunistic recovery of lead-polluted river in North Cardiganshire, JAE 7, 1938 p. 272
- (with EE Watkin) Investigations into fauna of sea-floor of Cardigan Bay, AS 4, 1922 p. 229–50
