= Laurie Sapper =

British trade unionist (1922–1989)

Laurence Joseph Sapper (15 September 1922 – 26 August 1989) was a British legal expert and trade union leader who became known for organising university teachers.

== Biography ==
Laurie Sapper was born into a Jewish family in London's East End. He spent most of his childhood in Hammersmith and attended Latymer Upper School. His younger brother Alan also went on to be a noted trade union leader.

In World War II, Sapper was a Senior Instructor in the Royal Air Force. During this time, he joined the Communist Party of Great Britain (CPGB). After the war, he worked for the Ministry of Agriculture while qualifying as a barrister. However, he never practised law; instead he wrote and spoke about legal issues. His publications included A Practical Guide to Your Job and the Law (1969) and numerous articles on law reform. He also participated in over 300 BBC broadcasts to discuss legal matters for ordinary citizens.

In the 1950s he became active in civil service unions. In 1951 he was Assistant General Secretary of the Institution of Professional Civil Servants. Five years later he moved to the Post Office Engineering Union where he was Deputy General Secretary. In 1969 he was elected General Secretary of the Association of University Teachers (AUT), and remained in that post until 1983. He helped build the AUT into a national organisation that fought for higher pay for university teachers. During his tenure, the AUT affiliated to the Trades Union Congress.

In retirement, Sapper supported the Morning Star group against the CPGB leadership, and defected to the new Communist Party of Britain.

Laurie Sapper died on 26 August 1989. He was survived by his wife Rita and their daughter.

Trade union offices
Preceded by Kenneth Urwin	General Secretary of the Association of University Teachers; 1969–1983	Succeeded by Diana Warwick
