= Art and Design Admissions Registry =

Former British administrative body

The Art and Design Admissions Registry (ADAR) was a British administrative body concerned with admissions to higher education courses in art and design outside universities. It was founded in 1966 and functioned for thirty years before being absorbed into the Universities and Colleges Admissions Service (UCAS) in 1996. ADAR was based in the city of Hereford.

Following the introduction of Art Foundation courses from 1963 onwards, interest among potential students increased in the range of higher education courses available nationally. Like the Central Register and Clearing House the ADAR scheme operated on a sequential rather than simultaneous basis, so that once a particular applicant had been accepted by their first choice their form did not circulate to further institutions.

In 1996, the scheme had 15,200 applications which led to 9,082 acceptances, compared to 6,900 acceptances in 1991.

Most major branches of British higher education merged their admissions systems in the new UCAS scheme in 1992, but Art and Design admissions presented particular problems since they worked to a later timetable as a result of the important role Art Foundation courses had in developing as fully as possible a student's proposed specialism (painting, sculpture, graphic design and so on). Work was furthermore generally submitted before a decision was made on whether to interview. A means of absorbing ADAR was found by 1996 although fears were expressed that students might be tempted to try to bypass the Foundation course preparatory route.

The merger with UCAS allowed that for a period there would be two routes of admission, one generally conforming to the UCAS timetable, and one running later to allow for the special circumstances of many Foundation applicants. A study in 2002 aimed to test whether the merged scheme had been as beneficial as its proponents had claimed,
