= Peter Dawson (trade unionist) =

Welsh trade union leader

- In office ?-?

Personal details
- Born: 18 March 1940 Swansea, Wales
- Died: 19 January 2005 (aged 64)
- Party: Labour
- Education: University College Swansea
- Occupation: Unionist, teacher

Joseph Peter Dawson (18 March 1940 – 19 January 2005) was a Welsh trade union leader.

== Biography ==
Born in Swansea, Dawson attended University College Swansea and qualified as a schoolteacher. From 1962 until 1964, he was a vice-president of the National Union of Students. After university, he found work at Chiswick Grammar School, but devoted much of his time to the National Union of Teachers (NUT) and in 1965 began working full-time for the union.

After working as a field officer for the NUT for four years, Dawson moved to become assistant secretary of the Association of Teachers in Technical Institutions (ATTI). In this role, he supported lecturers at the Guildford School of Art who had been sacked for objecting to it amalgamating with another college, and Jennifer Muscutt, who had been sacked from Garretts Green Technical College for taking part in a sexually-explicit educational film before she started working at the institution. Both cases were resolved successfully, and the ATTI grew rapidly, with Dawson moving to become its negotiating secretary in 1974.

The ATTI took part in a merger which formed the National Association of Teachers in Further and Higher Education (NATFHE), and in 1979 Dawson was appointed as general secretary of the new union. During the decade he led the union, it faced difficulties as further education budgets were cut.

In 1989, a new law required all union general secretaries to be elected. Dawson accordingly stood for his post, but lost the election to Geoff Woolf. Instead, Dawson returned to working as the union's assistant secretary, while devoting much of his time to international affairs, working part-time for the European Trade Union Committee for Education and then Education International.

Dawson retired in 1998, but continued working as a consultant to Education International, also serving as a Labour Party councillor on Lewisham London Borough Council.

Trade union offices
Preceded by Stan Broadbridge	General Secretary of the National Association of Teachers in Further and Higher Education; 1979–1989	Succeeded by Geoff Woolf
