= John Fulton, Baron Fulton =

British university administrator and public servant

The Right Honourable The Lord Fulton

Personal details
- Born: John Scott Fulton; 27 May 1902 Dundee, Scotland
- Died: 14 March 1986 (aged 83) Thornton-le-Dale, North Yorkshire, England
- Occupation: University administrator, public servant

John Scott Fulton, Baron Fulton (27 May 1902 – 14 March 1986) was a British university administrator and public servant. In education, he served as vice-chancellor of the University of Wales and of the University of Sussex, and was chair of the Universities Central Council on Admissions between 1961 and 1964. He also became a Governor of the BBC, serving as vice-chairman, led the Committee on the Civil Service which reported in 1968, and was chairman of the British Council from 1968 to 1971.

== Early life and career ==
Fulton was born in Dundee in 1902 and attended the High School of Dundee. He then studied at the University of St Andrews, and at Balliol College, Oxford, where he read classical honour moderations (1924) and literae humaniores (1926). He became a lecturer at the London School of Economics in the same year, before returning to Balliol College in 1928 as a fellow and tutor in philosophy. His title was changed to 'politics' in 1935 and he remained there until 1947, with a period in the Mines Department and in the Ministry of Fuel and Power during World War II. During this time he became a friend and colleague of Harold Wilson.

== University administrator ==
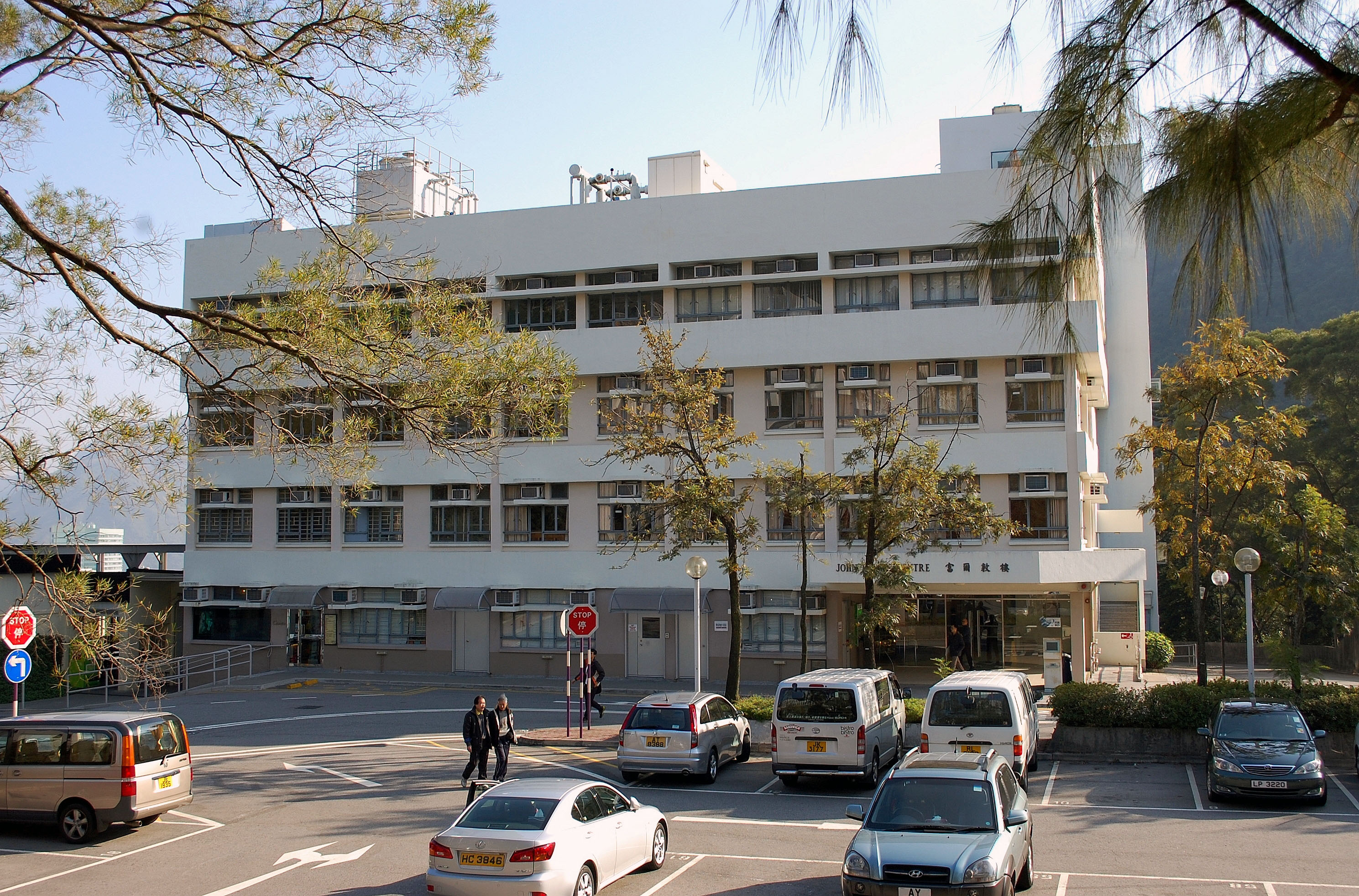
John Fulton Centre at the Chinese University of Hong Kong

Between 1947 and 1959, Fulton was principal of University College, Swansea, serving as the vice-chancellor of the University of Wales between 1952 and 1954, and between 1958 and 1959. Between 1952 and 1955, he was chairman of the Universities' Council for Adult Education and the council of the National Institute of Adult Education.

In 1959, he was appointed principal of the University College of Sussex, the first of several new universities termed 'plate glass universities', which became the University of Sussex (and Fulton Vice-Chancellor) when students started in 1961. He left in 1967, and during that time he also played a large part in the formation of the Universities Central Council on Admissions, serving as chairman between 1961 and 1964. He was a member of the Planning Committee of the Open University from 1967 to 1970.

He became involved in university policy making overseas, including in Malta, Sierra Leone, Nigeria, and Hong Kong, and in 1962, Fulton chaired the committee that established the new Chinese University of Hong Kong. He also served as chairman of the Inter-University Council for Higher Education Overseas from 1964 until 1968.

== Public service ==
From 1962 to 1965, Fulton was chairman of both the BBC and ITA committees on adult education. He served as a BBC governor from 1966 to 1971, serving twice as Vice-Chairman (1966–1967 and 1968–1971).

Wilson invited him to chair the Committee on the Civil Service in 1964. Reporting in 1968, it found that administrators were not professional enough, and in particular lacked management skills, and included the creation of a Civil Service College as one of its 158 recommendations.

In 1968, Fulton's international work continued as he became chairman of the British Council, serving until 1971.

Fulton became a Knight Bachelor in 1964, and became a life peer on 19 January 1966 as Baron Fulton, of Falmer in the County of Sussex.

== Personal life ==
Fulton's parents were Angus Robertson Fulton, who was principal of University College, Dundee, and his wife, Annie Scott. He married Jacqueline Wilkinson (1908-2004) in 1939 and they had three sons and one daughter.

He died at home in Thornton-le-Dale in North Yorkshire on 14 March 1986.
