= Stan Broadbridge =

British trade union leader (1928-1978)

Stanley Robertson Broadbridge (16 April 1928 – 22 November 1978), commonly known as Stan Broadbridge, was a British trade union leader, author, teacher, and communist activist.

== Career ==
Born in Barnet, Middlesex, Broadbridge attended Manchester University and graduated with a degree in economics. While still a university student, he joined the Communist Party of Great Britain (CPGB). His first published writing appeared in 1949 when he commented in the Party press that in elections where the CPGB did not stand its own candidate, it should endorse the Labour Party candidate. This viewpoint was in opposition to CPGB veteran Pat Sloan, who had recommended downplaying elections in which the only "leftist" option was a Labour candidate.

Broadbridge's teaching career began at a grammar school in Warrington, Lancashire. In 1957 he was hired as an economics lecturer at Leigh Technical College in Greater Manchester. By 1965 he was teaching at Staffordshire College of Technology, later renamed North Staffordshire Polytechnic.

For over a decade, Broadbridge was active in the Association of Teachers in Technical Institutions (ATTI), eventually becoming its national president in 1970-71. His other trade union posts in the 1970s included vice-president of the Stafford Trades Council, president of the Staffordshire County Federation of Trades Councils, and vice-chair of the West Midlands Regional Council of the Trades Union Congress.

During his years of trade union activism, Broadbridge continued his CPGB membership. In 1961 he authored a pamphlet, The Lancashire Cotton 'famine' (1861-65), that was part of the "Our History" series sponsored by the Communist Party Historians Group. He also contributed several articles to the Party-affiliated magazine, Labour Monthly.

In 1976 the ATTI merged with the new National Association of Teachers in Further and Higher Education (NATFHE), and Broadbridge was appointed its General Secretary at the start of 1977. He was asked in a newspaper profile if his Communist Party membership would affect his work in NATFHE. He replied:

I don't think politics enters into it, because it is not a political post. It is very much an administrative post. The General Secretary is expected to be the servant of the executive rather than the political leader of the association.

== Personal life ==
Broadbridge and his wife Eva met while they were students at Manchester University. They married in 1950 and had two daughters. In his spare time, Broadbridge enjoyed canal boating, and in 1974 he wrote The Birmingham Canal Navigations: Vol. 1, 1768-1846.

Not long after his tenure began as General Secretary of NATFHE, Broadbridge was diagnosed with cancer. He died in a hospital on 22 November 1978. He was 50 years old.

Trade union offices
Preceded by Tom Driver	General Secretary of the National Association of Teachers in Further and Higher Education; 1977–1978	Succeeded by Peter Dawson
