= Adult human female (disambiguation) =

Adult human female is an anti-transgender slogan.

Adult human female may also refer to:

- Adult Human Female (film), 2022 documentary
- Woman, an adult female human
