= Diana Warwick, Baroness Warwick of Undercliffe =

British politician and trade unionist (born 1945)

The Right Honourable The Baroness Warwick of Undercliffe
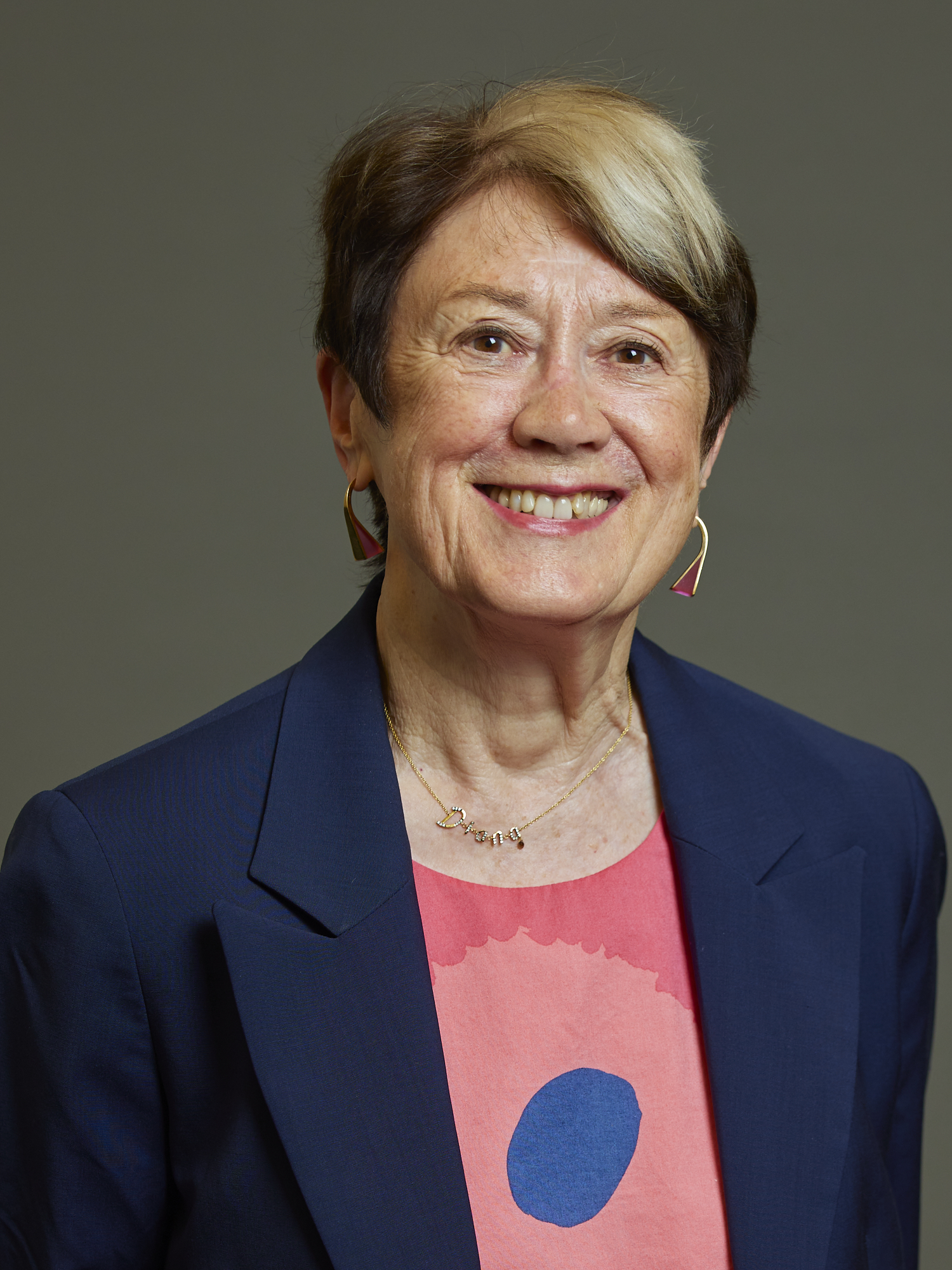
- Official portrait, 2023

Member of the House of Lords
- Lord Temporal
- Life peerage 10 July 1999

Personal details
- Born: Diana Mary Warwick; 16 July 1945 (age 81) Bradford, Yorkshire, England
- Party: Labour
- Education: Bedford College (BSc)

Diana Mary Warwick, Baroness Warwick of Undercliffe (born 16 July 1945) is a British politician and Labour member of the House of Lords. She was formerly a trade unionist and the Chief Executive of Universities UK.

== Background ==
Warwick was born in Bradford, Yorkshire and was educated at a local grammar school. She then attended Bedford College, University of London (now part of Royal Holloway, University of London), graduating with a BSc Sociology 1967.

== Career ==
Previously, Warwick was Assistant Secretary of the Civil and Public Services Association from 1972, General Secretary of the Association of University Teachers from 1983 to 1992 and Chief Executive of the Westminster Foundation for Democracy from 1992 to 1995. In 1992, Warwick left trade unions to become chief executive of the Westminster Foundation for Democracy, and was also Chair of the international development charity Voluntary Service Overseas (VSO). Warwick was Chief Executive of Universities UK for 14 years.

On 10 July 1999, she was created a life peer as Baroness Warwick of Undercliffe, of Undercliffe in the County of West Yorkshire.

When she was created a life peer, some commentators felt that she could not combine running the Committee of Vice Chancellors and Principals (CVCP) alongside being a Labour baroness in the House of Lords, and there were calls for her resignation.

Warwick was Chair of the Human Tissue 2 Authority from 2010 to 2014. From 2020 to 2022, Warwick was Chair of the National Housing Federation. She is also Chair of International Students House, London.

Warwick was awarded an Honorary Doctor of Science (Hon DSc) degree by the University of Warwick in 2022.

== Personal life ==
Her husband was Sean Terence Bowes Young (1943–2021), son of the director Terence Young and writer Dorothea Bennett.

Trade union offices
| Preceded by Laurie Sapper | General Secretary of the Association of University Teachers; 1983–1993 | Succeeded by David Triesman |
