= Jo Grady =

British trade union leader and academic

Jo Grady (born 7 April 1984) is a British senior lecturer in Employment Relations at the University of Sheffield, and a trade union leader who serves as the general secretary of the University and College Union (UCU).

== Biography ==
Grady was born in Wakefield in 1984, while her father was part of the UK miners' strike. She's mentioned that he worked at Lofthouse Colliery. She studied at Wakefield College, a further education institution, and then became the first member of her family to attend university, studying industrial relations at Lancaster University. In 2009 Grady began working as a lecturer in Trade Union Studies at the University of Leicester. She completed a PhD on trade union responses to neoliberal pensions reforms at Lancaster in 2011.

Grady joined the University and College Union (UCU) in 2006, and became joint secretary of its University of Leicester branch in 2016. She then moved to work at the University of Sheffield, and became active in the UCU branch there, as its pensions officer. In 2018, she was elected to the union's national dispute committee for the Universities Superannuation Scheme, and she enthusiastically supported the union's strike that year over cuts to the scheme. In 2019 she was elected to the union's National Executive Committee.

Grady ran in the election to become General Secretary of UCU, after Sally Hunt stood down in February 2019. Her campaign was noted for its strong online presence, and prominent badges and posters. She defeated Jo McNeill and Matt Waddup, taking 64% of the vote in the final round of voting.

In May 2023, Grady agreed to pay substantial damages to political commentator Paul Embery after a libel claim was made against her, following tweets that he said falsely portrayed him as "a misogynist, a pervert and a liar" that were made in response to him highlighting the anti-social behaviour of a group of women on a train.

In March 2024 Grady was re-elected as UCU General Secretary with 50.6% of the vote, and a majority of 182.

In May 2024 UCU staff took strike action over a dispute which includes issues around racism, organisational dysfunction, and the breach of the staff union's recognition agreement, after Grady agreed that another union would be recognised for UCU managers. As of March 2025, the dispute remained unresolved and strike action had been taken.

Trade union offices
Preceded by Sally Hunt	General Secretary of the University and College Union; 2019–present	Succeeded by Incumbent
