= Tom Driver (trade unionist) =

British trade union leader (1912–1988)

Tom Driver (9 September 1912 – 4 November 1988) was a British school teacher who became a leader of teacher trade unions.

Born in Kexborough near Barnsley, Thomas Driver came from a left-wing, working-class family in the South Yorkshire mining community. He studied at the University of Sheffield, where he edited the student newspaper, ran the Socialist Club, and joined the Communist Party of Great Britain (CPGB). After university, he returned to Kexborough; however, the only employment he could find was picking potatoes. He was also a leader in the local Labour Party.

In 1936 he married Thora Senior (they met when she was his nurse while he was hospitalized with rheumatic fever); the couple had two children. In 1937, Driver began a long career as a teacher of French, initially at Barnsley Central School, then at Keighley Junior Technical School. He became active in the National Union of Teachers (NUT) in Yorkshire. In 1947 he was hired by the new Doncaster Technical College. He joined the Association of Teachers in Technical Institutes (ATTI). Meanwhile, he was an executive member of the NUT.

In the 1960s, no teachers' unions were affiliated with the Trades Union Congress (TUC), but Driver consistently spoke in favour of doing so. In 1969 he finally persuaded the NUT membership to join the TUC. This move was followed by other teacher unions affiliating with the TUC.

Driver became president of the ATTI in 1961, and general secretary in 1969. He believed there should be one union representing college lecturers, and in 1976 he completed a merger with the Association of Teachers in Colleges and Departments of Education, forming the National Association of Teachers in Further and Higher Education. Teacher training colleges at the time were suffering from job losses, and Driver spent much of the next couple of years supporting redundant lecturers in teacher training. He led the teachers' side of the Burnham Further Education Committee from 1969 to 1977.

Driver's organisational work on behalf of teachers was recognized internationally. He was the secretary of the World Confederation of Organizations of the Teaching Profession (WCOTP). In that capacity, he sought to heal the rift between the WCOTP and FISE (Fédération Internationale des Syndicats d'Education).

In 1977, Driver was made a Fellow of the Educational Institute of Scotland. He was also an honorary fellow of the Sheffield City Polytechnic and of the North East London Polytechnic. Following his retirement in 1978, he was active in the pensioners' movement and sided with the Morning Star during its split from the CPGB in the 1980s.

Tom Driver died on 4 November 1988. He was 76.

Trade union offices
Preceded by Edward Britton	General Secretary of the Association of Teachers in Technical Institutes; 1969–1976	Succeeded by Position abolished
Preceded by New position	General Secretary of the National Association of Teachers in Further and Higher Education; 1976–1977	Succeeded by Stan Broadbridge
