= Kenneth Urwin =

British academic and trade union leader

Kenneth Urwin (31 December 1912 – 17 September 1991) was a British academic and trade union leader.

Urwin qualified as a barrister before completing a doctorate. He became a senior lecturer in French and Romance Philology at University College, Cardiff. He also joined the Association of University Teachers (AUT), becoming president of his local branch, and then serving on the union's national council from 1948, and its executive committee from 1954. In 1958, he was elected as the union's president, then the following year he was appointed as its first full-time executive secretary. The post was renamed as general secretary in 1965.

Under Unwin's leadership, the AUT became a more professional organisation, and it spent more time negotiating on salaries and pensions. He persuaded the union to accept staff of the new Colleges of Advanced Technology into the union, but was ambivalent about the creation of the plate glass universities. He helped save St David's College in Lampeter from closure by persuading it to link up with Cardiff.

In 1969, Urwin left his trade union post, to become director of the London region of the new Open University.

Trade union offices
Preceded by New position	General Secretary of the Association of University Teachers; 1959–1969	Succeeded by Laurie Sapper
