= Universities Central Council on Admissions =

Universities Central Council on Admissions (UCCA) provided a clearing house for university applications in the United Kingdom from its formation in 1961 until its merger with PCAS (Polytechnics Central Admissions System) to form UCAS in 1993.

== History ==
UCCA was created in response to concerns during the 1950s that the increase in university applications was unmanageable using the systems then in place, where each student applied individually to as many institutions as they chose. This concern led to the Committee of Vice Chancellors and Principals (CVCP) setting up an ad-hoc committee in 1957 to review the matter; this committee in its Third Report of January 1961 recommended the setting up of a central agency, which subsequently became known as UCCA. Its First and Second Reports had already made a number of recommendations aimed at harmonising admissions procedures across different universities.

The name UCCA referred originally to the management board (the Central Council) overseeing the new process, but soon came to refer to the organisation responsible for its day-to-day operation. With Ronald Kay as its chief executive, this was based initially in London at 29 Tavistock Square, in premises of the University of London, and moved to Cheltenham, Gloucestershire in 1968. UCCA was planned to start by October 1963. The new scheme had a pilot year handling a subset of applications for entry in 1963, and its first full year of operation handled admissions for 1964. The first year in 1963 was only for engineering and technical departments, with all departments from October 1964.

=== People ===
Assistance at the start came from Prof H.R. Pitt, Professor of Maths at the University of Nottingham and Mr A Plumb, the University of Nottingham registrar, with Prof L.C. Sykes, Professor of French at the University of Leicester. Students could apply to four universities.

The chairman was John Fulton, Baron Fulton, the Vice Chancellor of the University of Sussex. Also on the committee was Geoffrey Templeman, the registrar of the University of Birmingham from 1955, and later the chairman for six years in the late 1960s.

=== Antecendents ===
The scheme was essentially a collaborative venture between independent universities, and membership was voluntary. Most English universities joined from the start. The scheme didn't include medical and dental schools at London, Aberdeen, Glasgow, St Andrews or any university departments at Belfast - individual applications for these university departments had to be made. Belfast had around 90% of all Northern Ireland applicants, so Belfast didn't need to join, at first.

Oxford and Cambridge joined (with slightly modified procedures) for the 1966 entry; Belfast joined in 1966; the London medical and dental schools, as well as Stirling for 1967. By 1968 the office was handling 592,000 applications from 110,400 candidates to 80 institutions.

=== Technology ===
Initially, processing of applications was carried out using punched card technology. In 1964, UCCA started using the services of a computer bureau with a Univac machine; in 1967 it installed its own Univac computer. 70,000 applications had been made in 1955, with 190,000 applications in 1961 - for about 100,000 places.

=== Applications process ===
The actual application process remained largely unchanged during the life of the organisation, except for minor details. Candidates submitted a single application listing six (later five) universities. Copies of the application were sent to these universities (unlike UCCA's modern counterpart, UCAS), which could make various kinds of offer: unconditional, or conditional on grades achieved in the subsequent A-level examinations. Students could hold a maximum of two of these offers, a first choice, plus a reserve choice held in case they failed to achieve the grades asked by their first choice (if they received an unconditional or a pass-level offer from the university listed first on their application, no reserve could be held). In August, when the exam results were published, students who achieved their required grades (or who fell short of them, if the university had enough places available) would receive confirmation of their offer. Those who failed to receive a confirmed offer could apply for clearing, a process that matched the remaining unplaced candidates to the remaining unfilled places.

==== UCCA Points ====
An early objective of the central admissions process was to allow candidates to make objective comparisons between offers from different universities, and to this end conditional offers were expressed in terms of required grades in particular subjects in the A-level examinations; an offer might require, for example, that a candidate obtained an A grade in mathematics, and at least a C in physics and chemistry.

For clearing in particular, this system proved too complex, and universities with spare places on particular courses developed the practice of stating their minimum requirements in terms of an aggregate score: reckoning A=5, B=4, C=3, D=2, E=1, a required score of 9 meant they were prepared to consider any candidate with three Cs or equivalent, regardless of subject. The maximum score of 15 corresponded to three A grades.

With the introduction of AS-levels in 1989, the system was further refined to take account of results at both AS-level and A-level.

== See also ==
- Universities' Statistical Record
