= Central Register and Clearing House =

Administrative organization in teacher education in England and Wales

The Central Register and Clearing House (CRCH) was an administrative organisation in teacher education in England and Wales which existed for almost sixty years. It pre-dated by some thirty years a similar organisation for university courses (UCCA).

By the late 1920s great confusion had developed in admissions to teacher training courses. There were some fifty colleges. Potential students applied direct to each one and could receive an unlimited number of offers of places. Colleges had no idea how many students would arrive, and applicants had no central source of vacancy information. Problems were eased by ad hoc co-operation between the colleges and their joint Committee of Principals, but it became clear that an administrative solution was needed. The Training Colleges Clearing House was the result and was founded in 1933. Under the new system a candidate was considered in turn by only one college at a time, from a list chosen by each applicant, with forwarding of the application ceasing when a place was offered.

In 1943 the Committee of Principals became the Association of Teachers in Colleges and Departments of Education (ATCDE). By 1944 there were some 55 colleges and about 5000 applicants. There was a large post-war expansion in numbers being trained as teachers. From 1960 the Clearing House worked in close co-existence with the new Graduate Teacher Training Registry. In 1962 the newly renamed Central Register and Clearing House was set up as a limited company but was still supervised by the ATCDE and was based at their offices in Crawford Place, London W1. By 1972 the scheme had 160 member colleges and 56,000 applicants.

The CRCH was involved in discussions with both UCCA and the polytechnics as early as 1972 about the future shape of higher education admissions.

CRCH handled applications to non-teaching degree courses as these began to be introduced at its member colleges. The CRCH ceased to function after the cycle leading to admissions in 1992 and its responsibilities passed on to UCAS. Its records are lodged in the Library at the University of Warwick. Some had already been published in an earlier document.
