= HELOA =

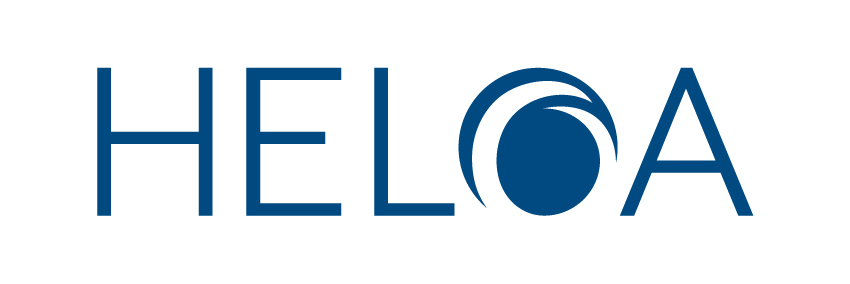
HELOA logo

HELOA is a professional association for access, recruitment and outreach staff working in Higher Education in the UK. Its mission is to support and enable its members to help students make informed decisions.

HELOA, a registered charity in England, Wales and Scotland, represents over 2000 members from more than 145 universities in the UK. It is a voluntary association, led by a committee of elected officers. The Association offers training and development opportunities to its members and provides advice and guidance about higher education to prospective students and their families. As well as a national committee, the HELOA operates a network of regional and national Groups, that maintain their own Group committees.

HELOA members typically work for UK universities or higher education institutions, in the fields of student recruitment, widening participation, outreach or marketing.

Much of the day-to-day administration of the HELOA is carried out by the HELOA office, which is based at Edge Hill University in Ormskirk.

== Executive and UK Committee ==
The HELOA is led by an executive and UK committee of elected and appointed officers, each responsible for different functions of the organisation. A normal term of office is three years. The current team is as follows:

- UK Chair - Reena Littlehales, Keele University
- UK Vice-Chair (Group Development) - Andy Jackson, University of South Wales / Prifysgol De Cymru
- UK Vice-Chair (Partnerships) - Raffaella Cuccia, City, University of London
- UK Vice-Chair (Training) - Emily Day, Lancaster University
- UK Vice-Chair (Finance) - Fiona Curry, University of Cumbria
- UK Vice-Chair (Governance & Policy) - Amy Slater-McGill, Aston University
- UK Vice-Chair (Administration & Membership) - Alex Whitham, Manchester Metropolitan University
- UK Vice-Chair (Communications) - Hannah Goodwin, University of Manchester

== HELOA Groups ==
The HELOA maintains a network of nine regional and national Groups.

== Annual Conference and AGM ==
HELOA hosts an annual conference in January each year. This is a three-day event involving training sessions and networking opportunities for members. During this event, there is a ceremony for the annual Innovation and Best Practice Awards.

The next conference is due to take place between 15–17 January 2025 in Stratford-upon-Avon.

The next HELOA Annual General Meeting will be held on 29 January 2025.

== Innovation and Best Practice Awards ==
The annual Innovation and Best Practice Awards recognise outstanding achievements of individual institutions in the fields of schools liaison, outreach and marketing. Members are asked to nominate their own projects and a shortlist and winner is decided by a panel of judges.

== Partnerships ==
The HELOA has formed a number of partnerships with organisations within the higher education sector.
