= Adult Human Female (film) =

- Directed by: Deirdre O'Neill and Michael Wayne
- Release date: December 2022
- Running time: 91 minutes
- Country: United Kingdom
- Language: English

Adult Human Female is a 2022 documentary film directed by Deirdre O'Neill and Michael Wayne. It was published on YouTube in December 2022.

It was the subject of controversy and protests due to its content, which a number of critics have characterised as being transphobic.

== History ==
The film had its screenings at a university in Australia cancelled in October 2022, and then had screenings cancelled at the University of Edinburgh in December 2022 and April 2023, due to protests by transgender advocates. It successfully screened at Edinburgh in an event organised by the University of Edinburgh Academics for Academic Freedom in November 2023 despite protests.

A discrimination and harassment lawsuit was filed by the filmmakers against the University and College Union in 2025 due to the union's campaigns to prevent the documentary from being screened. In mid-2025, a judge ruled that the film could be considered transphobic. The filmmakers disagreed with the ruling and in late 2025 launched an appeal.

== External link ==
- Adult Human Female on IMDb
