= UCAS Teacher Training =

UCAS Teacher Training, formerly the Graduate Teacher Training Registry (GTTR), is the subsidiary of UCAS responsible for student applications from graduates (and those about to graduate) to providers of Initial Teacher Training in the United Kingdom. Applications are filled out online via the UCAS website.

The Registry was founded in 1960 and was run in close association with the Central Register and Clearing House. Although the number of students on relevant courses did not exceed a few hundred at the time, rapid expansion was envisaged in view of both the likely increase in graduate numbers in general and the expectation that training would soon be made compulsory for graduates entering teaching.

Officials at the Ministry of Education feared that the need to spend time training would deter graduates in shortage subjects and age ranges from entering teaching, while teachers' organisations argued that training was required more urgently than ever, and, further, that the rate of graduates leaving teaching was in fact higher among the untrained than the trained. The National Advisory Council on the Training and Supply of Teachers unanimously advised the Secretary of State in 1963 that compulsory professional training should be introduced. Finally, in 1969 the decision was made that training would be required for those graduating after 31 December 1969 who wished to teach in state primary schools, and for those graduating after 31 December 1973 who wished to teach in state secondary schools.

The name of the GTTR as the application route had already appeared in careers material, for example in an article in "The Times" advising aspiring Drama teachers to apply to the Registry at 151 Gower Street, London WC1. The GTTR was a valuable statistical source, and Parliament was informed that in 1968-9 5269 graduate applications were processed, resulting in 4239 acceptances.

The GTTR moved to 3 Crawford Place, London W1 and again was closely integrated with the CRCH. The latter admissions body was wound up and merged with UCAS in 1992. The GTTR came under the umbrella of this new body, and moved to its premises in Cheltenham. Annual statistics are published on its website.
