= National Association of Teachers in Further and Higher Education =

Former trade union of the United Kingdom

- National Association of Teachers in Further and Higher Education
- Merged into: University and College Union
- Founded: 1904
- Dissolved: 1 June 2006
- Headquarters: London, UK
- Location: United Kingdom
- Members: 67,000
- Key people: Dennis Hayes, final president Paul Mackney, final general secretary
- Affiliations: TUC
- Website: Was http://www.natfhe.org.uk but no longer maintained. See University and College Union.

The National Association of Teachers in Further and Higher Education (NATFHE) was the British trade union and professional association for people working with those above statutory school age, and primarily concerned with providing education, training or research. In the higher education sector it was mainly concentrated in the Post 1992 sector.

In 2004, NATFHE celebrated 100 years since the London-based Association of Teachers in Technical Institutions (ATTI) was formed. ATTI grew and became NATFHE on 1 January 1976, following amalgamation with the Association of Teachers in Colleges and Departments of Education (ATCDE). As of 2005 it had 67,000 members.

On 2 December 2005, the results of a membership ballot on a merger of AUT and NATFHE were announced. The merger was supported by 79.2% of AUT and 95.7% of NATFHE members who voted. The two unions amalgamated on 1 June 2006, and then entered a transitional year until full operational unity was achieved in June 2007. The new union is called the University and College Union (UCU).

Until the merger, AUT and NATFHE members in higher education were involved in ongoing 'action short of a strike' - including boycotting setting and marking exams and other coursework in universities and this action continued under the UCU banner. AUT and NATFHE rejected an offer of 12.6% over three years which was made on 8 May, and a further offer of 13.12% over three years made on 30 May. Concerns grew that students might not be able to graduate in 2006 until the industrial action was suspended at midnight on 7 June while members were balloted on a new offer.

On the last day of its final conference, NATFHE passed motion 198C, a call to boycott Israeli academics who did not vocally speak out against their government. This was met with criticism from the Anti-Defamation League, a representative of the British Government, Nobel laureates and even the AUT.

== General Secretaries ==
1904: John Wilson
1908: Percy Abbott
192x: J. Wickham Murray
1941?: William Evans
195x: A. E. Evans
1955: Ernest Arthur Seeley
1960: Edward Britton
1969: Tom Driver
1977: Stan Broadbridge
1979: Peter Dawson
1989: Geoff Woolf
1994: John Akker
1997: Paul Mackney
