= University and College Union =

British trade union

- University and College Union
- Abbreviation: UCU
- Founded: June 1, 2006; 20 years ago
- Headquarters: London, NW1
- Location: United Kingdom
- Members: ▼119,785 (2024)
- General Secretary: Jo Grady
- Affiliations: TUC; STUC; ICTU; EI
- Website: www.ucu.org.uk

The University and College Union (UCU) is a British trade union in further and higher education representing nearly 120,000 academics and support staff. UCU is a vertical union representing casualised researchers and teaching staff, "permanent" lecturers and academic related professional services staff. Definitions of all these categories are currently rather ambiguous due to recent changes in fixed term and open-ended contract law. In many universities, casualised academics form the largest category of staff and UCU members.

== History ==
UCU was formed by the merger on 1 June 2006 of two British trade unions: the Association of University Teachers (AUT) and the National Association of Teachers in Further and Higher Education (NATFHE). During its first year, a set of transitional rules was in place until full operational unity was achieved in June 2007. During the first year of the new union the existing General Secretaries (Sally Hunt and Paul Mackney) remained in post, managing the union’s day-to-day business jointly. Paul Mackney did not stand for General Secretary of UCU owing to ill-health and Sally Hunt was elected general secretary of the union on 9 March 2007, and took office on 1 June 2007. Sally Hunt was re-elected twice, in 2012 and 2017, but was then forced to resign for health reasons in February 2019. Jo Grady was elected to be the next UCU general secretary in May 2019 and re-elected for a second term in March 2024.

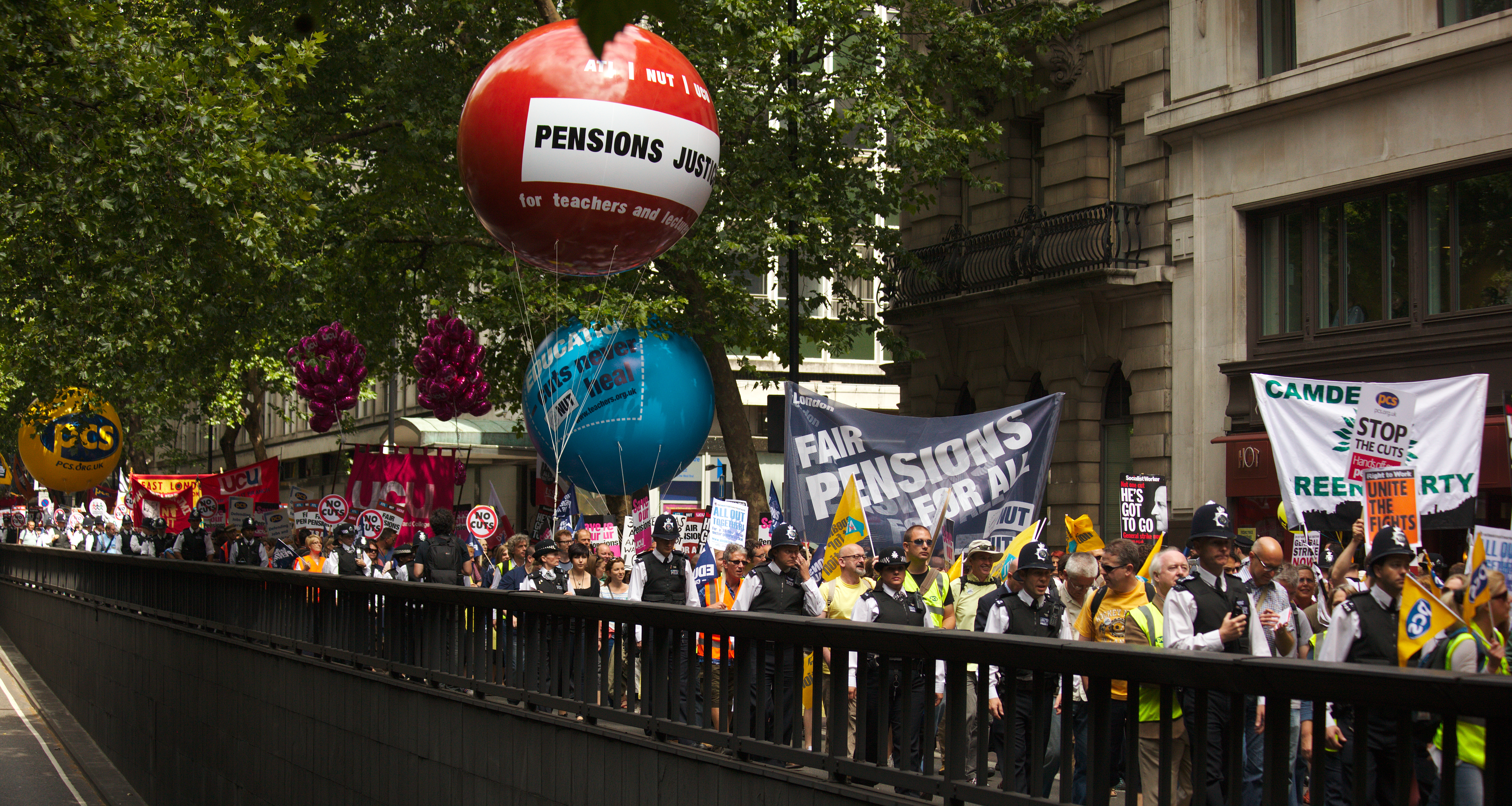
Striking teachers and public sector workers march down the Kingsway, London, flanked by police on 30 June, as part of the 2011 United Kingdom anti-austerity protests.

== Positions ==
=== Privatisation of education ===
UCU campaigned against private finance initiative transfers and joint ventures, such as those proposed by INTO University Partnerships.

=== Stopping casualisation ===
UCU campaigns heavily to reduce academic casualisation, including the use of temporary contracts to employ tutors, lecturers and project researchers. UCU's view of project research is that research is performed more efficiently by professional and stable career researchers, based in researcher pools and assigned to projects internally as they come up, as in most non-university project-based organisations. As in industry, researchers between projects should be considered "on the bench", paid out of full economic costs from previous grant income, and use their bench time to manage new project bids and fulfill their continued professional development quotas. Hourly paid bank workers on zero-hours contracts have also been represented by UCU, and in universities such as Edinburgh these positions have been replaced by full-time jobs as a result.

== Industrial action ==
=== 2006 HE industrial action ===
the demonstration on the first day of the new union

Until the merger, AUT and NATFHE members in higher education were involved in ongoing 'action short of a strike' - including boycotting setting and marking exams, and 'Mark and Park' where members would mark coursework but did not release marks and this action was continued by the UCU. Staff were taking industrial action over issues of pay, and the gap that has grown up over the last 20–30 years between their remuneration and that of other similarly qualified public-sector professionals. Prime Minister Tony Blair promised that a significant percentage of new money released for universities would be put towards lecturers' pay and this had not happened. AUT and NATFHE rejected an offer of 12.6% over three years which was made on 8 May and a further offer of 13.12% over three years made on 30 May.

Concerns grew that students would not be able to graduate in 2006. The National Union of Students' leadership supported the staff's action and, although the matter was raised at various meetings, NUS support for staff was never successfully challenged. In response to feedback from a group of students' unions, NUS advised AUT/NATFHE (UCU) that their support for action could not be indefinite and was wholly dependent on seeking a fast resolution. Many students' unions from around the country went further and openly condemned the action taken by the staff unions as holding the students to ransom. To support the industrial action the new union, on its very first day of existence, organised a 'day of solidarity' by its higher education members. This included a demonstration in London which ended with a lobby at the headquarters of the employers' body, the Universities and Colleges Employers' Association (UCEA).

Following further talks on 6 June 2006 between UCU and UCEA, sponsored by the TUC and Acas, the UCU agreed to a ballot of its members on the 13.1% offer (with an increase of around 15% for lower paid members of non-academic university staff) over three years, with the important proviso that any monies docked from striking staff would be repaid and that an independent review would consider the mechanisms for future negotiations and the scope of funding available to universities for future pay settlements. The pay increase was phased over the three years, with the final year's figure subject to further increase in line with inflation. The boycott of assessment was suspended on 7 June 2006.

=== 2013 UK higher education strike ===
UCU members took part in industrial action across the UK on 31 October 2013.

=== 2018 strike for USS ===
In 2018, members took part in strike action in February and March in a dispute with Universities UK (UUK) over the Universities Superannuation Scheme (USS). In 2019, members took part in strike action in November and December in another dispute with the UUK over the pension scheme and with the UCEA over pay, workload, equality, and casualisation.

== Boycott of Israel ==
Since 2007, the UCU has been controversially involved in the academic boycotts of Israel and for rejecting the previously accepted definition of "antisemitism". Some Jewish members resigned following claims of an underlying institutional antisemitism.

=== 2007 ===
On 30 May 2007, the congress of the UCU called for the UCU to circulate a boycott request by Palestinian trade unions to all branches for information and discussion, and called on lecturers to "consider the moral implications of existing and proposed links with Israeli academic institutions". Dr John Chalcraft, of the London School of Economics, said: "A boycott will be effective because Israel considers itself part of the West: when Western civil society finally says 'enough is enough', Israelis, not to mention Western governments, will take notice. A non-violent international boycott, like that of South Africa, may well play a historic role in bringing down the Israeli system of apartheid."

The British Committee for the Universities of Palestine (BRICUP), established by British academics in 2004 to promote academic boycotts of Israel and to support Palestinian universities, did much of its work within the UCU. In September 2007, delegates at the Liberal Democrat conference voted to condemn the UCU's "perverse" decision, and called for UCU members to reject the proposal and continue to engage in "the fullest possible dialogue" with their Israeli and Palestinian counterparts.

=== 2009 ===
There was a great deal of discussion concerning the links between the calls for boycott and a growth of antisemitism in the UK, and on British campuses in particular in 2009. While organisations such as Engage or Scholars for Peace in the Middle East argue that widespread antisemitism is at the root of the problem, some academics dispute this and say that it is a self-defeating argument. This was particularly the position taken by a representative of Israel's universities in the UK, Professor David Newman who, while countering the attempts at academic boycott, did not see all such activity as being inherently antisemitic. Newman, the Dean of the Faculty of Humanities and Social Sciences at Israel's Ben-Gurion University, focused his activities on strengthening scientific and academic links between Israel and the UK, and was influential in creating the BIRAX research and scientific cooperation agreement between the two countries – an agreement which was promoted by successive British Ambassadors to Israel, Tom Philips and Matthew Gould, and which has been funded, among others by the Pears Foundation in London.

Professor Neve Gordon, a professor of Political Science at Ben-Gurion University, published a column in the Los Angeles Times in the summer of 2009, supporting boycott activity against Israel for as long as the country continued with its policy of occupation. This led to demands for his dismissal by many of the university supporters and donors in the United States, and resulted in a lively debate about the limitations of academic freedom among Israeli academics.

In 2009, the UCU passed a resolution to boycott Israeli academics and academic institutions. However, the vote was immediately declared invalid as UCU attorneys repeated previous warnings that such a boycott would likely trigger legal action against UCU. The UCU also rejected a resolution urging them to examine the trend of "resignations of UCU members apparently in connection with perceptions of institutional antisemitism". Tom Hickey, from the University of Brighton, put forward one of two motions calling for lecturers to "reflect on the moral and political appropriateness of collaboration with Israeli educational institutions".

Camilla Bassi, from Sheffield Hallam University, opposed the boycott, stating that it would "not help anyone" and would be "part of an anti-Jewish movement." Jeremy Newmark of the Jewish Leadership Council and joint head of Stop the Boycott, sharply criticised the boycott proposal, stating that: "Whether you are a trade unionist wanting a powerful union or whether you are a long-standing campaigner for peace, it is clear that the UCU has taken leave of its senses." Later that year, the Norwegian University of Science and Technology rejected the academic boycott of Israel, stating that being able to cooperate with Israeli academics, and hearing their views on the conflict, is critical for studying of the causes of the conflict between Israel and the Palestinians and how it can be resolved.

=== 2010 ===
At the 2010 conference, UCU members voted to support the BDS campaign against Israel and sever ties with the Histadrut (Israel's organisation of trade unions). Tom Hickey, from the University of Brighton, who introduced the motion, stated that the Histadrut had supported "the Israeli assault on civilians in Gaza" in January 2009, and "did not deserve the name of a trade union organization". An amendment to this motion, which sought to "form a committee which represents all views within UCU to review relations with the Histadrut" and report back in a year, was defeated. The UCU's boycott motion invoked a "call from the Palestinian Boycott National Committee" for "an isolation of Israel while it continues to act in breach of international law" and calls to "campaign actively" against Israel's trade agreement with the European Union.

=== 2011 ===
At the 2011 conference, the UCU voted to adopt an academic and cultural boycott of Israel and to disassociate the UCU from the European Monitoring Centre on Racism and Xenophobia (EUMC)'s discussion paper on a working definition of antisemitism.

After several years of promoting discriminatory boycotts and ignoring the resignation of dozens of Jewish members, UCU has never taken claims of antisemitism in the union seriously. Now, in a final insult to its Jewish members, UCU is cynically redefining the meaning of 'antisemitism' so it never has to face up to its own deep-rooted prejudices and problems.

— Spokesman for the Board, the JLC and the CST

The union's abrogation was sharply criticised by leaders of Jewish organisations in the UK and Israel, including Jon Benjamin, chief executive of the Board of Deputies of British Jews (the Board); Paul Usiskin, chairman of Peace Now UK; Oliver Worth, chairman of the World Union of Jewish Students; Dan Sheldon, Union of Jewish Students; and Jeremy Newmark, chief executive of the Jewish Leadership Council, who said: "After this weekend's events, I believe the UCU is institutionally racist."

The Jewish Leadership Council (JLC) wrote to the Equalities and Human Rights Commission (EHRC) to express its concern, while a letter of protest was sent to UCU General Secretary Sally Hunt from Mick Davis (chair of trustees of the JLC), Gerald M. Ronson (trustee of the JLC and chairman of the Community Security Trust (CST)), Vivian Wineman (president of the Board and chair of the Council of Membership of the JLC) and Sir Trevor Chinn CVO (vice-president of the JLC). Wineman, also wrote to university vice chancellors asking them to consider whether maintaining a normal relationship with UCU was compatible with their requirement to "eliminate discrimination and foster good relations" with minorities. Representatives of the JLC, the Board and the Community Security Trust appealed to government ministers David Willetts and Eric Pickles to support a formal EHRC investigation into the decision, and Ariel Hessayon, a lecturer at Goldsmiths University, resigned from the UCU in protest at the union's disassociation from the EU's discussion paper. Sally Hunt responded that the UCU remained opposed to antisemitism and asked for a meeting with Jewish leaders to help write an "acceptable" definition of anti-Jewish prejudice.

The result is that the proceedings are dismissed in their totality... Lessons should be learned from this sorry saga. We greatly regret that the case was ever brought. At heart, it represents an impermissible attempt to achieve a political end by litigious means... We are also troubled by the implications of the claim. Underlying it we sense a worrying disregard for pluralism, tolerance and freedom of expression, principles which the courts and tribunals are, and must be, vigilant to protect.

— Courts and Tribunals Judiciary, Judgement Fraser v UCU, 22nd March 2013

In 2011, Jewish UCU member and chair of the Academic Friends of Israel, Ronnie Fraser, sued the union for breach of the Equality Act 2010 with the Employment Tribunal. In March 2013, the complaint was rejected in its entirety with the judgement describing it as "an impermissible attempt to achieve a political end by litigious means."

=== 2013 ===
In May 2013, Stephen Hawking joined the academic boycott of Israel by reversing his decision to participate in the Jerusalem-based Israeli Presidential Conference hosted by Israeli president Shimon Peres. Hawking approved a published statement from the British Committee for the Universities of Palestine that described his decision as independent, "based upon his knowledge of Palestine, and on the unanimous advice of his own academic contacts there". Noam Chomsky and Malcolm Levitt were among a group of 20 academics who lobbied Hawking to undertake the boycott, based upon a belief that a boycott is the proper method for a scientist to respond to the "explicit policy" of "systemic discrimination" against the non-Jewish and Palestinian population.

== Consultation and use of online surveys ==
The union has been criticised for its use of online consultations when helping to determine policy. Such a survey was used for the general secretary’s proposal to Congress in 2012 that the size of the National Executive Committee be reduced from 70 members to a maximum of 40, to save money on expenses. Such consultations were challenged at Congress on the grounds that they ‘encourage people to vote without hearing the debates first’.

== Discrimination and harassment claim – "Adult Human Female" ==
Two members of UCU made an unsuccessful claim against it for discrimination and harassment in connection with the prevention of the screening of a film "Adult Human Female" which was due to be shown at the University of Edinburgh in 2022. The members, who say they have "gender-critical" views, describe the film as looking at the "clash between women’s rights and gender ideology/trans rights". UCU said in its defence to the claim: "The conduct of the respondent [UCU] was to highlight its commitment to supporting its members that identify as trans or non-binary. The respondent’s conduct was proportionate and in line with its current support for its trans, non-binary and LGBT+ members."

== Electoral sub-groups ==
There are several groups that run or endorse candidates for union elections.

=== Campaign for UCU Democracy ===
Campaign for UCU Democracy describe themselves as "committed to a union that is built on strong principles of union democracy and transparency as well as strategic and tactical thinking".

=== Rank and File Network ===
The Rank and File Network describes itself as "not aligned to any faction within the union but believe firmly in a member-led union in a meaningful sense" but does make voting recommendations in elections.

=== UCU Commons ===
UCU Commons describe their common values as being for "equality in all its forms", "transparency", and "Education is a public good".

=== UCU Independent Broad Left ===
UCU Independent Broad Left described itself as "a group open to all like-minded UCU members who agree to work together to unite the Union around a progressive trade union and equality agenda." . It no longer functions as an organised faction.

=== UCU Left ===
UCU Left described itself as "committed to building a democratic, accountable campaigning union which aims to mobilise and involve members in defending and improving our pay and conditions and defending progressive principles of education". It has been criticised for having "always been controlled by the Socialist Workers Party".

== Other sub-groups ==
=== Anti-casualisation network ===
UCU Anti-casualisation network is a group of activists within the union who are focused on reducing casualisation. Its voice has increased in recent years, including calls to national UCU to strike over casualisation issues instead of, or as well as, over pay.

== General Secretary elections ==
UCU holds elections for general secretary every five years, using the Alternative Vote system. Upon formation of the union, there was a one-year transitional period (2006—07) in which the post of general secretary was jointly held by the general secretaries of the predecessor institutions: Sally Hunt from AUT and Paul Mackney from NATFHE.

UCU General Secretaries
Years	General secretary
2006—07	Sally Hunt and Paul Mackney
2007—19	Sally Hunt
2019—	Jo Grady

=== 2007 general secretary election ===
An election for general secretary was held in 2007. There were three candidates:

- Sally Hunt (UCU joint general secretary)
- Peter Jones (Deeside College)
- Roger Kline (UCU head of equality and employment rights)

The results were as follows:

2007 election
Candidate	Round 1		Round 2
		Jones eliminated	Hunt elected
Hunt	7605	+858	8463
Jones	2494	−2494	
Kline	6151	+966	7117
unassigned		+670	670

There were a total of 16,250 valid papers and 465 invalid papers, making a total of 16,715. This was out of an electorate of 116,512, representing a turnout of 14.3%.

=== 2012 general secretary election ===
As Sally Hunt's first five-year term as elected general secretary of UCU had come to an end, an election was held in 2012. There were two candidates:

- Mark Campbell (London Metropolitan University)
- Sally Hunt (UCU general secretary)

The results were as follows:

2012 election
Candidate	Round 1
	Hunt elected
Campbell	3941
Hunt	10776

There were a total of 14,717 valid papers and 328 invalid papers, making a total of 15,045. This was out of an electorate of 117,918, representing a turnout of 12.8%.

=== 2017 general secretary election ===
As Sally Hunt's second five-year term as elected general secretary of UCU had come to an end, an election was held in 2017. There were two candidates:

- Sally Hunt (UCU general secretary)
- Jo McNeill (University of Liverpool)

The results were as follows:

2017 election
Candidate	Round 1
	Hunt elected
Hunt	8138
McNeill	5586

There were a total of 13,724 valid papers and 156 invalid papers, making a total of 13,880. This was out of an electorate of 101,497, representing a turnout of 13.7%.

=== 2019 general secretary election ===
A general secretary election was held in 2019, triggered by the resignation of Sally Hunt. There were three candidates:

- Jo Grady (University of Sheffield)
- Jo McNeill (University of Liverpool)
- Matt Waddup (UCU head of policy and campaigns)

The results were as follows:

2019 election
Candidate	Round 1		Round 2
		McNeill eliminated	Grady elected
Grady	11515	+3699	15214
McNeill	6019	−6019	
Waddup	6104	+1617	7721
unassigned		+703	703

There were a total of 23,738 valid papers and 43 invalid papers, making a total of 23,681. This was out of an electorate of 115,311, representing a turnout of 20.5%.

=== 2024 general secretary election ===
As Jo Grady's five-year term as general secretary came to an end, an election was held in 2024. The candidates were:

- Vicky Blake (University of Leeds)
- Jo Grady (UCU general secretary)
- Ewan McGaughey (King's College London)
- Saira Weiner (Liverpool John Moores University)

The results were as follows:

2024 election
Candidate	First preference	Stage 2	Stage 3	Outcome
		Weiner eliminated	Blake eliminated	
Weiner	2580			
Blake	3837	4821		
Grady	5990	6441	7758	Elected
McGaughey	4724	5306	7576	
Non-transferable		563	1797	

== Officers ==
According to its rules, UCU has five UK officers: the Vice-President, the President-elect, the President, the Immediate Past President, and the Honorary Treasurer. UCU has an annual election in which the successful candidate serves a year as Vice-President, a year as President-elect, a year as President and a year as Immediate Past President. In alternate years, this election is restricted to candidates from the Further Education sector, and candidates from the Higher Education sector. An Honorary Treasurer is elected for a two-year term every other year (with no restriction on sector).

UCU officers From the further education sector (FE) From the higher education sector (HE)
Year	Vice-President	President-elect	President	Immediate Past President	Honorary Treasurer
2006—07			Dennis Hayes (NATFHE^{[a]}); Steve Wharton (AUT^{[a]})		
2007—08	Alastair Hunter (HE)	Sasha Callaghan (FE)	Linda Newman (HE)		Alan Carr
2008—09	Alan Whitaker (FE)	Alastair Hunter (HE)	Sasha Callaghan (FE)	Linda Newman (HE)	Alan Carr
2009—10	Terry Hoad (HE)	Alan Whitaker (FE)	Alastair HunterHE)	Sasha Callaghan (FE)	Alan Carr
2010—11	Kathy Taylor (FE)	Terry Hoad (HE)	Alan Whitaker (FE)	Alastair Hunter (HE)	Alan Carr
2011—12	Simon Renton (HE)	Kathy Taylor (FE)	Terry Hoad (HE)	Alan Whitaker (FE)	Alan Carr
2012—13	John McCormack (FE)	Simon Renton (HE)	Kathy Taylor (FE)	Terry Hoad (HE)	Alan Carr
2013—14	Elizabeth Lawrence (HE)	John McCormack (FE)^{[b]}	Simon Renton (HE)	Kathy Taylor (FE)	Angela Roger
2013—14	post vacant	Elizabeth Lawrence (HE)	Simon Renton (HE)	Kathy Taylor (FE)	Angela Roger
2014—15	Joanna de Groot (HE)	Rob Goodfellow (FE)	Elizabeth Lawrence (HE)	Simon Renton (HE)	Angela Roger
2015—16	Joanna de Groot (HE)	Rob Goodfellow (FE)	Elizabeth Lawrence (HE)	post vacant	Angela Roger
2016—17	Vicky Knight (FE)	Joanna de Groot (HE)	Rob Goodfellow (FE)	Elizabeth Lawrence (HE)	Angela Roger
2017—18	Douglas Chalmers (HE)	Vicky Knight (FE)	Joanna de Groot (HE)	Rob Goodfellow (FE)	Steve Sangwine
2018—19	Nita Sanghera (FE)	Douglas Chalmers (HE)	Vicky Knight (FE)^{[c]}	Joanna de Groot (HE)	Steve Sangwine
2019—20	Vicky Blake (HE)	Nita Sanghera (FE)^{[d]}	Douglas Chalmers (HE)	post vacant	Steve Sangwine
2019—20	post vacant	Vicky Blake (HE)	Douglas Chalmers (HE)	post vacant	Steve Sangwine
2020—21	Justine Mercer (HE)	Janet Farrar (FE)	Vicky Blake (HE)	Douglas Chalmers (HE)	Steve Sangwine
2021—22	Justine Mercer (HE)	Janet Farrar (FE)	Vicky Blake (HE)	post vacant	Steve Sangwine
2022—23	Maxine Looby (FE)	Justine Mercer (HE)	Janet Farrar (FE)	Vicky Blake (HE)	Steve Sangwine
2023—24	Maria Chondrogianni (HE)	Maxine Looby (FE)	Justine Mercer (HE)	Janet Farrar (FE)	David Harvie
2024—25	David Hunter (FE)	Maria Chondrogianni (HE)	Maxine Looby (FE)	post vacant	David Harvie
2025—26	Dyfrig Jones (HE)	David Hunter (FE)^{[e]}	Maria Chondrogianni (HE)	Maxine Looby (FE)	Andrew Feeney
2025—26	post vacant	Dyfrig Jones (HE)	Maria Chondrogianni (HE)	Maxine Looby (FE)	Andrew Feeney
2026—27	Mark Pendleton (HE)	Suzi Toole (FE)	Dyfrig Jones (HE)	Maria Chondrogianni (HE)	Andrew Feeney

1. In the first year of UCU's existence, the two presidents of the predecessor unions served as co-president.
2. John McCormack died on 13 December 2013; in response to the vacancy thus created, Elizabeth Lawrence assumed the post of President-Elect early and held the post of President for two years.
3. At the end of Vicky Knight's 2018—19 presidential term, she resigned to take up a job at Unison; the post of Immediate Past President was thus empty in 2019—20.
4. Nita Sanghera died on 16 January 2020; in response to the vacancy thus created, Vicky Blake assumed the post of President-Elect early and held the post of President for two years. In addition, Victoria Showunmi was co-opted to perform some of the functions of a Vice-President, including acting as interim vice-chair of HEC.
5. David Hunter resigned as President-Elect with effect from 31st July 2025. As a result, the decision was taken to elect an officer from Further Education who would serve two years as President-Elect 2026—28, one year 2028—29 as President, and one year 2029—30 as Immediate Past President, and also an officer from Higher Education who would serve two years as Vice-President 2026—28, one year 2028—29 as President-Elect, and one year 2029—30 as President. Additionally, Suzi Toole was co-opted to perform some of the functions of a Vice-President, including for FEC.
