= Polytechnic (United Kingdom) =

Former tertiary education teaching institution

A polytechnic was a tertiary education teaching institution in England, Wales (Welsh: coleg polytechnig) and Northern Ireland offering higher diplomas, undergraduate degree and postgraduate education (masters and PhD) that was governed and administered at the national level by the Council for National Academic Awards. At the outset, the focus of polytechnics was on STEM subjects, with a special emphasis on engineering. After the passage of the Further and Higher Education Act 1992 they became independent universities, which meant they could award their own degrees. The comparable institutions in Scotland were collectively referred to as Central Institutions.

Like polytechnics or technological universities (institute of technology) in other countries, their aim was to teach both purely academic and professional vocational degrees (engineering, computer science, law, architecture, management, business, accounting, journalism, town planning, etc.). Their original focus was applied education for professional work, and their original roots concentrated on advanced engineering and applied science (STEM subjects); though soon after being founded they also created departments concerned with the humanities. The polytechnic legacy was to advance and excel in undergraduate and postgraduate degrees in engineering and technology (STEM) education that now form a core faculty at many universities in the UK. While many former polytechnics have advanced their research focus, many have retained their original ethos by focusing on teaching for professional practice.

The term 'poly' is used informally for pre-1992 polytechnics.

== History ==
=== 19th century ===
Some polytechnics trace their history back to the early 19th century. The first British institution to use the name "polytechnic" was the Royal Cornwall Polytechnic Society in 1832, which it still retains, together with the affectionate nickname "The Poly".

The London Polytechnic (now the University of Westminster) emerged from the Royal Polytechnic Institution which was founded at Regent Street, London in 1838. The establishment of the polytechnic was a reaction to the rise of industrial power and technical education in France, Germany and the US. Degrees at the London Polytechnic were validated by the University of London.

Woolwich Polytechnic (later Thames Polytechnic, now the University of Greenwich) in south-east London, emerged in the 1890s and is considered the second-oldest polytechnic in the UK.

The South-Western Polytechnic Institute (1895–1922) was founded for 'the provision of education for the poorer inhabitants of London'. It offered practical training in STEM subjects for adult men, alongside a day school for 13-15-year-old boys and girls. The Institute evolved into Chelsea Polytechnic, eventually merging into King’s College in the University of London.

=== 1960s–1992 ===
Most polytechnics were formed in the expansion of higher education in the 1960s. Academic degrees in polytechnics were validated by the UK Council for National Academic Awards (CNAA) from 1965 to 1992. The division between universities and polytechnics was known as the binary divide in UK higher education. The CNAA was chartered by the British government to validate and award degrees, and to maintain national quality assurance standards. The CNAA subject boards from their inception were from the universities; a CNAA degree was formally recognised as equivalent to a university degree, and the courses were under strict scrutiny by assessors external to the polytechnics. Sub-degree courses at these institutions were validated by the Business & Technology Education Council (BTEC).

Some polytechnics were often seen as ranking below universities in the provision of higher education, because they lacked degree-awarding powers, concentrated on applied science and engineering education, and produced less research than the universities, and because the qualifications necessary to gain a place in one were sometimes lower than for a university (the failure rate in the first year of undergraduate courses was high, due to a rigorous filtering process). However, in terms of an undergraduate education, this was a misconception, since many polytechnics offered academic degrees validated by the CNAA, from bachelor's and master's degrees to PhD research degrees. In addition, professional degrees in subjects such as engineering, town planning, law, and architecture were rigorously validated by various professional institutions. Many polytechnics argued that a CNAA degree was superior to many university degrees, especially in engineering, due to the external independent validation process employed by the CNAA, the oversight of the engineering institutions, and innovations such as sandwich degrees. Such innovations made a polytechnic education more relevant for professional work in applying science and advanced technology in industry.

In certain parts of UK culture, an engineering, applied science and technological education tended to be looked down upon socially. Industries and activities such as "manufacturing" and "engineering" were perceived by some to be things of the past, boring, and "dirty". The connection with polytechnics did not help them to achieve status in the public eye. This attitude and influence led to an expansion of the more popular subjects in the "creative" industries, such as fashion, arts and design, media studies, journalism, film studies, and sports management. The social influence caused many polytechnics to change their faculty of "Engineering" into a faculty of "Design and Technology".

The creation of polytechnics is regarded by many as a controversial experiment, with no clear consensus as to its overall effectiveness. The original focus of the polytechnic institutions was STEM subjects, especially degrees in engineering, applied science, and life sciences, but soon after they formed, they developed faculties in humanities, law, architecture, journalism and other professional occupations. With the Further and Higher Education Act 1992, this era ended when polytechnics became "new universities", broadening their educational scope and conferring degrees in their own right. The University of Ulster was formed in 1984 from a merger between the New University of Ulster and the Ulster Polytechnic — the only such "trans binary merger" that crossed the divide.

For many years, a central admissions system for polytechnics was not seen as necessary. However, a large increase in applications resulted from funding cuts to universities in the early 1980s. The Polytechnics Central Admissions System was introduced, and handled the years of entry from 1986 to 1992.

=== Post-1992 ===
Under the Further and Higher Education Act 1992 they became fully fledged universities. After 1992, the former polytechnics ("new universities") awarded their own degrees. Most sub-degree BTEC qualifications have been phased out of the new universities, and transferred to colleges of further education.

The polytechnics changed their names when they gained university status. Some simply dropped "polytechnic" and added "university" to their titles. For example, the Huddersfield Polytechnic became the University of Huddersfield. However, this was often not possible as there was another university with the name. One alternative title was "Metropolitan University", because the institution was situated in a city or other large metropolitan area. Such examples are the Manchester Metropolitan University and London Metropolitan University. These titles are often shortened to "Met" (Man Met, London Met) or an acronym (MMU, LMU). Others adopted a name which reflects the local area, such as Nottingham Trent University (named after the River Trent which flows through Nottingham) and Sheffield Hallam University ("Hallam" refers to the area of South Yorkshire in which much of Sheffield is situated). Ulster Polytechnic remains the only polytechnic to unite with a university; this occurred in 1984.

The last degree-awarding institution to hold on to the name "polytechnic" after 1992 was Anglia Polytechnic University (which had only attained polytechnic status the previous year). The word was soon identified as being off-putting to potential students, and the university became known as Anglia Ruskin University from 2005.

== List of former polytechnics ==
At their peak there were over thirty polytechnics in England, Wales and Northern Ireland, the English ones being primarily located in urban areas large enough to support industry or commerce, from which they usually took the city name. These are now universities.

In England, there are:

- Anglia Ruskin University, formerly Anglia Polytechnic (located in Cambridge and Chelmsford)
- Birmingham City University, formerly Birmingham Polytechnic
- University of Brighton, formerly Brighton Polytechnic
- Bournemouth University, formerly Bournemouth Polytechnic
- University of Lancashire, formerly Lancashire Polytechnic and before that Preston Polytechnic (until 1984)
- Coventry University, formerly Coventry Polytechnic and Lanchester Polytechnic (until 1987)
- De Montfort University Leicester, formerly Leicester Polytechnic
- University of East London, formerly North East London Polytechnic and Polytechnic of East London
- University of Greenwich, formerly Woolwich Polytechnic (until 1970), then Thames Polytechnic
- University of Hertfordshire, formerly Hatfield Polytechnic
- University of Huddersfield, formerly Huddersfield Polytechnic
- Kingston University, formerly Kingston Polytechnic
- Leeds Beckett University, formerly Leeds Polytechnic and as Leeds Metropolitan University from 1998 to 2013
- Lincoln University was formed in part from Humberside Polytechnic which was briefly Humberside University
- Liverpool John Moores University, formerly Liverpool Polytechnic
- London Metropolitan University, formerly City of London Polytechnic and Polytechnic of North London
- Manchester Metropolitan University, formerly Manchester Polytechnic
- Middlesex University, formerly Middlesex Polytechnic
- University of Northumbria at Newcastle, formerly Newcastle Polytechnic
- Nottingham Trent University, formerly Trent Polytechnic (later Nottingham Polytechnic)
- Oxford Brookes University, formerly Oxford Polytechnic
- University of Plymouth, Plymouth Polytechnic (until 1989), then Polytechnic South West
- University of Portsmouth, formerly Portsmouth Polytechnic
- Sheffield Hallam University, formerly Sheffield Polytechnic
- South Bank University, formerly South Bank Polytechnic (in London)
- University of Staffordshire, formerly Staffordshire Polytechnic and previously North Staffordshire Polytechnic
- University of Sunderland, formerly Sunderland Polytechnic
- Teesside University, formerly Teesside Polytechnic
- University of the West of England, formerly Bristol Polytechnic
- University of West London, formerly Polytechnic of West London
- University of Westminster, formerly Polytechnic of Central London and the Royal Polytechnic Institution – Regent Street
- University of Wolverhampton, formerly Wolverhampton Polytechnic

In addition, Wales has

- University of South Wales, formerly Polytechnic of Wales and University of Glamorgan

and Northern Ireland has:

- New University of Ulster which was a plate glass university. It absorbed the former Ulster Polytechnic, afterwards it was known as the University of Ulster. It is now known as Ulster University

In Scotland there were comparable Higher Education institutions called Central Institutions but these very rarely used the designation "Polytechnic" in their titles; these also converted into universities.

- One institution that did briefly use the designation "Polytechnic" was Edinburgh Napier University. Between 1988 and 1992 the institution was known as Napier Polytechnic.

== See also ==
- College of advanced technology (United Kingdom)
- Universities in the United Kingdom
- Education in Finland § Tertiary education, a similar divide in Finland
