= Association of University Teachers =

Former trade union of the United Kingdom

AUT
- Association of University Teachers
- Merged into: University and College Union
- Founded: 1909
- Dissolved: 1 June 2006
- Headquarters: United House, 1 Pembridge Road, London
- Location: United Kingdom
- Members: 49,000 (on merger)
- Key people: Sally Hunt, final general secretary
- Publication: AUT Bulletin
- Affiliations: TUC
- Website: aut.org.uk

The Association of University Teachers (AUT) was the trade union and professional association that represented academic (teaching and research) and academic-related (librarians, IT professionals and senior administrators) staff at pre-1992 universities in the United Kingdom. The final general secretary of AUT was Sally Hunt.

AUT also had branches in a number of post-1992 universities (the ex-polytechnics and other institutes that have become universities since 1992) and in university colleges, although the main union representing academic staff in these institutes was the National Association of Teachers in Further and Higher Education (NATFHE).

On 2 December 2005, the results of a membership ballot on a merger of AUT and NATFHE was announced. The merger was supported by 79.2% of AUT and 95.7% of NATFHE members who voted. The two unions amalgamated on 1 June 2006, and after a transitional year, full operational unity was achieved in June 2007. The new union is called the University and College Union (UCU).

== History ==
=== The formation of AUT (1909-1919) ===
In 1909, Douglas Laurie, a young zoology lecturer at Liverpool University called a meeting "To consider a proposal to form an Association for bringing together the members of the Junior Staff more into touch with one another and with the life of the University"

At this time an increasing number of non-professorial staff were being employed. These Junior Staff or Assistant Lecturers were poorly paid, did essentially the same duties as professors and had few promotion prospects. In addition they had no representation on the bodies governing the Universities. Although the society formed at Liverpool was formally a "dining and discussion society" from an early stage it was clearly a new pressure group.

At first its aims were local and in 1910 it won a campaign over representation on the faculties but on learning that similar groups had been formed or were in the process of formation they invited representatives of the junior staff from Bristol, Sheffield, Birmingham, Cardiff and Manchester for a dinner.

In 1913 the junior staff at the Victoria University of Manchester (now the University of Manchester) presented a request for improvements in pay and grading to their University Council. This included a suggestion that the starting pay should be substantially increased. The Council replied that while it agreed that eventually there should be an increase, at the current time there was insufficient money to pay for this.

By 1917 inflation had rapidly eroded the value of salaries and Douglas Laurie called a meeting on 15 December 1917 to draw up a memorandum to present to the Board of Education. Almost as an after thought he invited representatives of Assistant Lecturers from all Universities. The meeting was attended by delegates from 15 institutions. The issues raised by the memorandum drafted at the meeting included: pay; tenure; status; grading; opportunities for research and superannuation. Finally a motion was passed to a new association with the name "The Association of University Lecturers". The name (which implicitly excluded professors from membership) caused some dissent but a split was prevented. However the Scottish Lecturers went their own way and formed a separate Association in 1922 which later merged with AUT in 1949 but retained some of its autonomy.

The issue of pensions brought the idea of professional unity to the fore. The pension scheme for lecturers was to be left out of the new Teachers pension fund formed by the Teachers' (Superannuation) Act 1918. As pension funds affect staff at levels of their career this created pressure the Association to be one which included professors as well.

At a conference in Bristol 27–28 June 1919 professorial delegates were present. The name of the new Association was left until all other matters were decided. The draft rules circulated at the conference read "The name of the society shall be... (to be decided at a later date)". This was to be repeated nearly a century later when delegates to the 2005 AUT council were presented with a draft rulebook for the merger with NATFHE which stated: "The name of the union shall be [insert name]". Speaking from the chair Laurie pointed out that "the idea which brought the Association into being was of a trade union character, but expressed the hope that, when material conditions had been satisfactorily improved, educational matters generally would form the essential points on which discussion would take place".

In the end it was agreed that the new association's objectives would be"the advancement of University Education and Research and the promotion of common action among University teachers in connection therewith" with membership open to professors. Finally the name Association of University Teachers was voted for nem con (no votes against but some abstentions) and Douglas Laurie was elected as the first President.

It is interesting to speculate how the Association would have developed if professors had been excluded from membership and it was set up on a basis of representing solely the junior staff..

The Association's structure was a federation of Local Associations (branches) which elected delegates to a Central Council. The Council delegates then elected an Executive Committee. The Council itself met twice a year.

=== Industrial action against new pay structures 2004 ===
In March 2004, AUT members took industrial action over the proposed new pay structures (the Framework Agreement) offered by the Universities and Colleges Employers Association (UCEA). The original proposals from UCEA would have meant large reductions in income due to smaller annual increments. The action involved a one-day national strike and one-day strikes in each of the four countries of the UK, followed by an assessment boycott that threatened to derail examinations that summer. The industrial action lasted 25 days before UCEA gave in and agreed to many of the union's demands. The agreement included the so-called Memorandum of Understanding which provided certain safeguards on the way the new pay structures were to be implemented in pre 1992 universities. However the agreement did not cover post 1992 universities.

=== Boycott of Israeli universities 2005 ===
On 22 April 2005, the AUT Council voted to boycott two Israeli universities: the University of Haifa and Bar-Ilan University. The motions to AUT Council were prompted by the call for a boycott from Palestinian academics and others. The AUT Council voted to boycott Bar-Ilan because it runs courses at colleges in the occupied West Bank (referring to Ariel College) and "is thus directly involved with the occupation of Palestinian territories contrary to United Nations resolutions". It boycotted Haifa because it was alleged that the university had wrongly disciplined a lecturer. The action against the lecturer was supposedly for supporting a student who wrote about attacks on Palestinians during the founding of the state of Israel. The boycott, which was not compulsory, was set to last until Haifa "ceases its victimisation of academic staff and students who seek to research and discuss the history of the founding of the state of Israel".

The AUT's decision was immediately condemned by Jewish groups and members of the AUT. Critics of the boycott within and outside the AUT noted that, at the council at which the boycott motion was passed, the leadership had cut short debate citing a lack of time. The Board of Deputies of British Jews and the Union of Jewish Students accused the AUT of purposely holding the vote during Passover, when many Jewish members could not be present. Israel's embassy in London issued a statement criticizing the AUT's vote as a "distorted decision that ignores the British public's opinion", and condemning the resolutions for being "as perverse in their content as in the way they were debated and adopted." Zvi Ravner, Israel’s deputy ambassador in London, also noted that "[t]he last time that Jews were boycotted in universities was in 1930s Germany." Abraham Foxman of the Anti-Defamation League issued a statement condemning the "misguided and ill-timed decision to boycott academics from the only country in the Middle East where universities enjoy political independence".

The AUT said that members had voted for the boycott in response to a plea for action by a group of Palestinian academics. It was condemned by the Israeli Embassy, the British Ambassador in Israel, by Jewish Human Rights groups, by al-Quds University in Jerusalem, by the National Postgraduate Committee of the UK, and by Universities UK.

Some members of the AUT, headed by Open University lecturer Jon Pike - subsequently gathered enough signatures to call a special meeting on the subject. The meeting was held on 26 May 2005, at Friends Meeting House in London. At the meeting, the AUT decided to cancel the boycott of both Israeli universities. Reasons cited for the decision were: the damage to academic freedom, the hampering of dialogue and peace effort between Israelis and Palestinian, and that boycotting Israel alone could not be justified.

=== Merger with NATFHE 2004-2007 ===
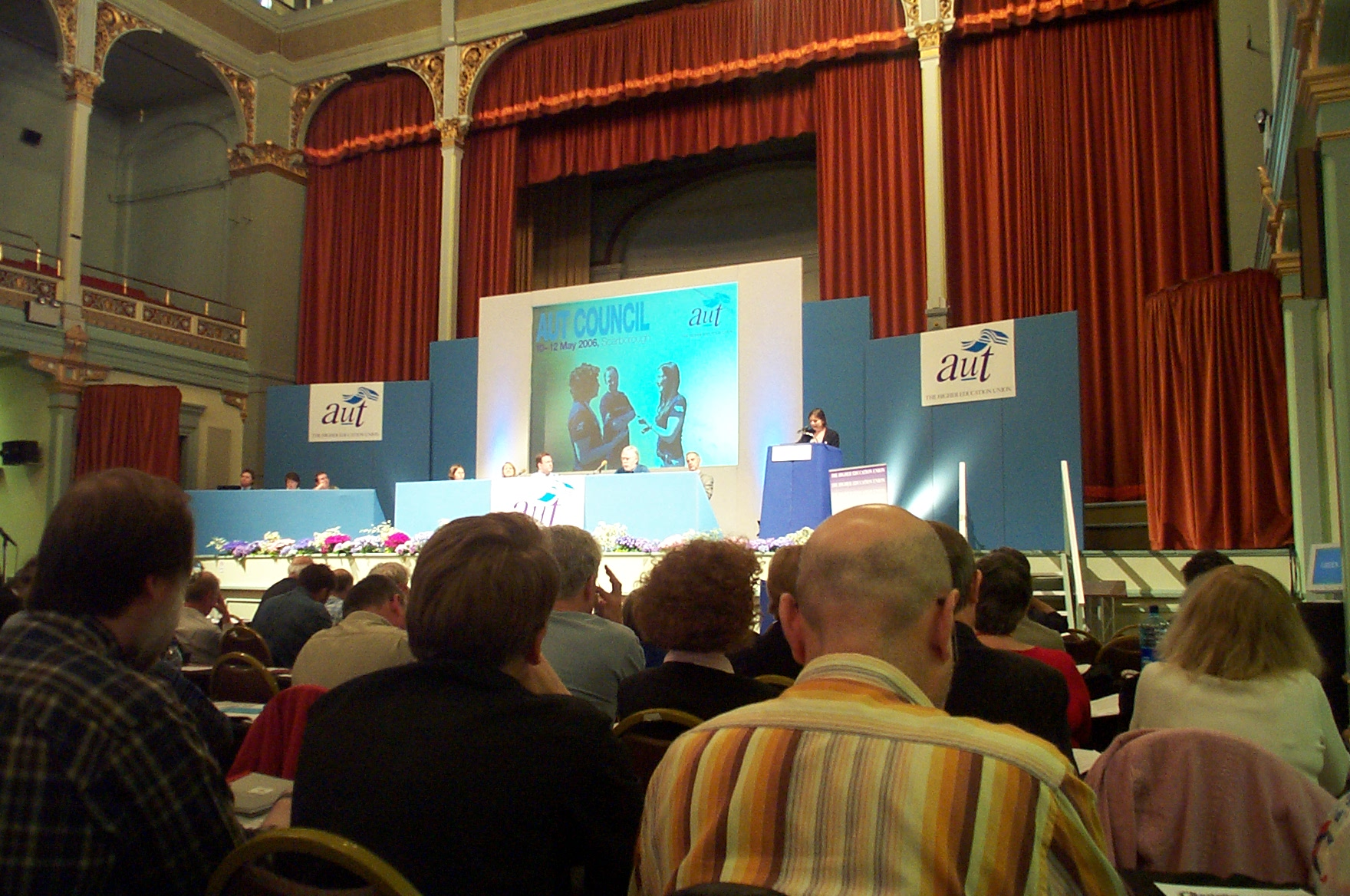
General secretary Sally Hunt addressing the last annual Council of the AUT before its merger with Natfhe to form the UCU.

Attempts had been ongoing for some time to develop a plan for merger. Prior to 2004, these however, came to nothing. In 2004 both AUT's and NATFHE's conferences voted to "explore ways of achieving maximum unity between the two unions". Initially it was not clear what form this would take - closer collaboration, full merger or something in between. However proposals for a new union which would include all AUT and NATFHE members quickly emerged and proposals to ballot the members were endorsed at the conferences in April and May 2005. On 2 December 2005 the results of the ballot was announced. The merger was supported by 79.2% of AUT and 95.7% of NATFHE members who voted. The two unions amalgamated on 1 June 2006, and then entered a transitional year until full operational unity is achieved in June 2007. The new union is called the University and College Union (UCU).

=== 2006 AUT and NATFHE industrial action ===
In 2006 AUT and NATFHE engaged in industrial dispute with Universities and Colleges Employers Association (UCEA) over pay. AUT and NATFHE claimed that UCEA promised that one third of the extra income from top up fees would be spent on pay and their 2006 pay claim was based on this. UCEA's initial response was "that it is very likely that a significant proportion of the HE sectors new income will be spent on improvements in staff pay and conditions, but that HEIs had never given a commitment". AUT and NATFHE both voted for strike action and carried out a one-day stoppage on 8 March. From 9 March to 6 June they boycotted the marking of exams and coursework, with the AUT (but not NATFHE) also boycotting the setting of exams and they rejected an offer of 12.6% over three years which was made on 8 May and a further offer of 13.12% over three years made on 30 May. Concerns grew that students might not be able to graduate in 2006 until the industrial action was suspended at midnight on 7 June while members were balloted on a new offer.

== List of General Secretaries ==
Note that initially AUT in its early days was very much an amateur organisation and only appointed a full-time secretary in 1959, who gained the title of General Secretary in 1965.

=== Honorary General Secretary ===
1919: Francis Raleigh Batt (secretary)
1920: Robert Douglas Laurie
1953: Lord Chorley

=== General Secretaries ===
1965: Kenneth Urwin (executive secretary 1959-1965)
1969: Laurie Sapper
1983: Diana Warwick
1993: David Triesman
2001: Paul Cotterill (acting general secretary)
2002: Sally Hunt
