= List of education trade unions =

Education trade unions are trade unions which represent staff associated with any level of education, and whether they are teachers, leadership or temporary workers.

== International ==
- Education International
  - Merging of
    - International Federation of Free Teachers' Unions (1951–1992)
    - World Confederation of Organizations of the Teaching Profession (1951–1992)
    - World Confederation of Teachers (1963–2007)

== Africa ==
- Tanzania Teachers’ Union

== Asia ==
- Alliance of Concerned Teachers (Philippines)
- All ceylon union of Government English teachers
- All Ceylon Union of Teachers
- All Primary Teachers Association
- Ceylon Teachers Service Union
- Ceylon Independent teachers service union
- Japan Teachers' Union
- Korean Teachers & Education Workers' Union
- Nepal National Teachers Association
- Nepal Teachers Association

== Europe ==
- Association of Headteachers and Deputes in Scotland
- Association of Secondary Teachers, Ireland
- Association of School and College Leaders
- Association of Teachers and Lecturers
- Association of University Teachers
- Educational Institute of Scotland
- European School Heads Association
- Irish National Teachers' Organisation
- Muslim Teachers Association
- National Association of Head Teachers
- NASUWT - The Teachers' Union
- National Association of Teachers in Further and Higher Education (1904–2006)
- National Autonomous School Workers' Trade Union (Italy)
- National Education Union
- National Society for Education in Art and Design
- Scottish Secondary Teachers' Association
- Teachers' Union of Ireland
- Undeb Cenedlaethol Athrawon Cymru
- Union of Women Teachers
- Unison
- University and College Union

== North America ==
- NEA-Alaska
- Alabama Education Association
- American Association of University Professors
- American Federation of Teachers
- Arizona Education Association
- Arkansas Education Association
- British Columbia Teachers' Federation
- California School Employees Association
- California Teachers Association
- Chicago Teachers Union
- Cincinnati Federation of Teachers
- Colorado Education Association
- Communications Workers of America
- Connecticut Education Association
- University of the District of Columbia Faculty Association/NEA
- Delaware State Education Association
- Education Minnesota
- Federal Education Association
- Federation of the National Education
- Florida Education Association
- Georgia Association of Educators
- Graduate Employees Together - University of Pennsylvania
- Graduate Employees and Students Organization
- Graduate Student Organizing Committee
- Hawaii State Teachers Association
- Idaho Education Association
- Illinois Education Association-NEA
- Indiana State Teachers Association
- Iowa State Education Association
- Kansas National Education Association
- Kentucky Education Association
- Louisiana Association of Educators
- Maine Education Association
- Manitoba Teachers' Society
- Maryland State Education Association
- Massachusetts Teachers Association
- Michigan Education Association
- Education Minnesota
- Mississippi Association of Educators
- Missouri NEA
- MEA-MFT
- National Education Association
- Nebraska State Education Association
- Nevada State Education Association
- Newark Teachers Association
- NEA-New Hampshire
- New Jersey Education Association
- NEA-New Mexico
- New York City Teachers Union (1916–1964), also "Teachers Union" and "TU"
- New York State United Teachers
- North Carolina Association of Educators
- North Dakota Education Association
- Ohio Education Association
- Ohio Federation of Teachers
- Oklahoma Education Association
- Ontario Secondary School Teachers' Federation
- Oregon Education Association
- Pennsylvania State Education Association
- Professional Educators of Tennessee
- NEA Rhode Island or National Education Association Rhode Island
- Rhode Island Federation of Teachers and Health Professionals
- Saint Lucia Teachers' Union – SLTU
- Saskatchewan Teachers' Federation
- Scranton Diocese Association of Catholic Teachers
- South Carolina Education Association
- South Dakota Education Association
- Teachers' Federation of Puerto Rico
- Teachers Union (also "TU" and "New York City Teachers Union") (1916–1964)
- Temple University Graduate Students Association
- Tennessee Education Association
- Texas State Teachers Association
- UNITE HERE
- United Federation of Teachers
- United Teachers Los Angeles
- United Teachers of New Orleans
- Utah Education Association
- Utah School Employees Association
- Virginia Education Association
- Vermont-NEA
- Washington Education Association
- Wisconsin Education Association Council
- West Virginia Education Association
- Wyoming Education Association

== Oceania ==
- Australian Education Union
- Independent Education Union of Australia
- National Tertiary Education Union
- New South Wales Teachers Federation
- Post-Primary Teachers Association of New Zealand (PPTA)
- Queensland Teachers Union
