= Terry Casey (trade unionist) =

British trade unionist (1920–1987)

Terence Anthony Casey CBE (6 September 1920 – 18 March 1987) was a British trade union leader.

Casey was educated at Holy Cross School in Ramsgate, then qualified as a teacher at Camden College. During World War II, he served with the Royal Army Education Corps as a teacher. From 1946, he worked at state schools in London, and he joined the National Association of Schoolmasters (NAS). In 1956, he became the headteacher at St Joseph's School in Maida Vale. He became increasingly active in the National Association of Schoolmasters (NAS), and negotiated for it to have a representative on the Burnham Committee from 1961, a role he held from then until his retirement. He also served as the union's president in 1962/63.

In 1963, Casey was elected as general secretary of the NAS. In this role, he encouraged the formation of the Union of Women Teachers and developed a close alliance between the two, before in 1975, he led a strongly contested merger of the two unions. He became general secretary of the new union, the National Association of Schoolmasters Union of Women Teachers (NASUWT). From 1978, he also served as vice president of the International Federation of Free Teachers' Unions and treasurer of the European Teachers' Trade Union Committee. He had a poor working relationship with Fred Jarvis, his opposite number at the rival National Union of Teachers. Shirley Williams described Casey as "aggressively masculine" and believing that men had superior minds to women.

Casey retired from his union posts in 1983, and served on committees including those of the Catholic Education Council and the Voluntary Sector Consultative Council. He was appointed CBE in the 1977 New Year Honours.

Trade union offices
Preceded by Edward Rushworth	General Secretary of the National Association of Schoolmasters; 1963–1975	Succeeded by Position abolished
Preceded by Eric Winterbottom	President of the National Federation of Professional Workers; 1971–1973	Succeeded by Geoffrey Drain
Preceded by New position	General Secretary of NASUWT; 1975–1983	Succeeded by Fred Smithies
