= International Federation of Secondary Teachers =

The International Federation of Secondary Teachers (French: Fédération internationale des professeurs de l'enseignement secondaire officiel, FIPESO) was a global union federation bringing together trade unions representing secondary school teachers.

== History ==
The federation was established in 1912 at a meeting in Brussels attended by unions from France, Belgium and the Netherlands. Initially named the International Bureau of National Associations of Teachers in Public Secondary Schools, it became moribund during World War I, but was revived after the war and began growing. By 1932, it had 26 affiliates, with a total of 100,000 members. It became the "International Federation of Secondary Teachers" in 1935.

In 1921, the federation launched the International Bulletin journal, for the discussion of education issues. After World War II, the federation also began campaigning on professional and social topics. It built closer contacts with the International Federation of Teachers' Associations (IFTA), which represented primary school teachers, while with the International Teachers' Federation and World Organisation of the Teaching Profession (WOTP), it formed the loose Comité d'Entente, to lobby international organisations on education issues.

In 1952, FIPESO, the IFTA and the WOTP merged to form the World Confederation of Organizations of the Teaching Profession. FIPESO continued as an autonomous section of the new federation. Its membership initially grew, as secondary education expanded in many countries, but fell during the 1970s, rebounding in the 1980s as it attracted members in Africa, Latin America and Asia. In 1993, it dissolved, its remaining members joining the new Education International.

== Affiliates ==
The following unions were affiliated in 1979:

Union	Country	Membership
Australian Teachers' Federation	Australia	40,617
Austrian Teachers' Union	Austria	1,500
Barbados Secondary Teachers' Union	Barbados	217
Fédération de l'enseignement moyen official du degré supérieur de Belgique	Belgium	1,000
Gymnasiekolernes Laererforening	Denmark	4,000
Association of Estonia High School Teachers in exile	Estonia	101
Trade Union of Education in Finland	Finland	12,500
Syndicat national des enseignements de second degré	France	45,500
Syndicat national des personnels de direction de l'enseignement secondaire	France	2,991
German Teachers' Association	West Germany	67,500
German Philologists' Association	West Germany	Unknown
Association of Masters and Mistresses in Government-recognised Secondary Schools	Guyana	120
Association of High School Teachers	Iceland	166
Association of Secondary Teachers, Ireland	Ireland	4,800
Israel Teachers' Union	Israel	3,300
Association of Secondary School Teachers in Israel	Israel	6,000
Federazione Nazionale Insegnanti Scuole Media	Italy	450
Sindicato Nazionale Scuola Media	Italy	Unknown
Association des professeurs de l'enseignement supérieur et secondaire	Luxembourg	515
Malta Union of Teachers	Malta	50
Dutch Association of Teachers	Netherlands	13,657
Norwegian Association of Graduate Teachers	Norway	6,763
Singapore Middle School Teachers' Union	Singapore	600
National Union of Teachers	Sweden	18,911
Swiss Union of High School Teachers	Switzerland	3,560
Swiss Teachers' Union	Switzerland	2,900
Secondary Heads' Association	United Kingdom	2,727
Assistant Masters' and Mistresses' Association	United Kingdom	70,700
Educational Institute of Scotland	United Kingdom	20,317
National Union of Teachers	United Kingdom	69,733
Sindikat Radnika Drustvenih Delatnosti Jugoslavije	Yugoslavia	8,333

== Leadership ==
=== General Secretary ===
1921: Achille Beltette
1933: Charles Boulanger
1939: Janet M. Lawson
1954: Andrew Hutchings
1965: Émile Hombourger
1972: André Drubay
1982: Louis Weber

=== Presidents ===
1921: Albert Fedel
1930s: G. R. Parker
1940s: Karl Kärre
Émile Hombourger
H. Reinhardt
1965: Andrew Hutchings
1973: Franz Ebner
1977: Otto Kaltenborn
1981: Joyce Baird
1985: Ernst Kiel
1989: Kieran Mulvey
1991:
