= Eamonn O'Kane (trade unionist) =

Northern Irish trade unionist (1945-2004)

Eamonn Rory O'Kane (21 August 1945 – 22 May 2004) was a Northern Irish trade unionist.

Born in Belfast to a Catholic family, O'Kane studied at St Malachy's College and Queen's University, Belfast. He spent a short time at Cardiff University, where he got to know Neil Kinnock, before returning to Belfast at the start of The Troubles to become a teacher at St Patrick's College, Belfast.

O'Kane joined the Northern Ireland Labour Party (NILP) in Newtownabbey, and was briefly also active in People's Democracy. By the early 1970s, he was prominent in the "Workers' Association for the Democratic Settlement of the National Conflict in Ireland", a group linked to the British and Irish Communist Organisation, which was influential in the Newtownabbey NILP. In 1972, he was one of nine Workers' Association members who chained themselves to radiators at the Department of External Affairs in Dublin, calling for the Irish government to recognise Northern Ireland. His bail was paid by Conor Cruise O'Brien, but all nine were later convicted of forcible entry. In 1977, he became the first president of the Campaign for Labour Representation in Northern Ireland, which advocated that the British Labour Party organise and stand candidates in Northern Ireland.

O'Kane joined the National Association of Schoolmasters, which in 1975 became part of the National Association of Schoolmasters Union of Women Teachers (NASUWT). He gradually rose to prominence, being elected as secretary of the Belfast branch in 1974, then to the National Executive in 1979, as chair of the salaries committee in 1982, and president of the union in 1987. Within the union movement, O'Kane was known as a right-winger, and was often critical of the policies of the rival National Union of Teachers (NUT).

In 1990, O'Kane ran in the election to become General Secretary of the NASUWT. He was defeated by Nigel de Gruchy, but de Gruchy supported O'Kane's subsequent successful campaign to become his deputy. In 2002, he succeeded de Gruchy as General Secretary, and immediately negotiated a merger with the NUT and Association of Teachers and Lecturers. However, this merger was opposed by de Gruchy, and the union's conference voted against it.

O'Kane died of cancer in May 2004, still in post.

Trade union offices
Preceded by Nigel de Gruchy	Deputy General Secretary of the National Association of Schoolmasters Union of Women Teachers; 1990 – 2002	Succeeded by Chris Keates
Preceded by Nigel de Gruchy	General Secretary of the National Association of Schoolmasters Union of Women Teachers; 2002 – 2004	Succeeded by Chris Keates
