= Fred Smithies =

British trade unionist (1929–2018)

Frederick Albert Smithies (12 May 1929 – 24 September 2018) was a British trade unionist.

Born in Lancashire, Smithies was educated at St Mary's College, Blackburn and St Mary's College, Twickenham, qualifying as a teacher. He taught in Accrington until 1960, then moved to Northampton, where he taught at St Mary's High School. He also joined the National Association of Schoolmasters and was elected to its National Executive in 1966, remaining on the body after a merger formed the National Association of Schoolmasters Union of Women Teachers (NASUWT).

In 1976, Smithies was elected as vice-president of NASUWT, then, later in the year, as the union's assistant general secretary. In 1981, he was promoted to deputy general secretary, and he was elected as general secretary in 1982, taking up the post early in 1983. While in post, he also served on the General Council of the Trades Union Congress and the executive of the International Federation of Free Teachers' Unions. He retired from the NASUWT in 1990, although he remained honorary treasurer of the international federation until 1993.

Trade union offices
Preceded by ?	Deputy General Secretary of NASUWT; 1981–1982	Succeeded by Nigel de Gruchy
Preceded by Terry Casey	General Secretary of NASUWT; 1983–1990	Succeeded by Nigel de Gruchy
