= Joyce Baird =

British trade unionist (1929–2015)

Joyce Elizabeth Leslie Baird (8 December 1929 – 3 October 2015) was a British trade unionist.

Baird studied at The Abbey School, Reading, then at Newnham College, Cambridge, before training as a secretary. In 1952, she worked briefly as secretary to Erno Goldfinger, a well-known architect, before taking up a long-term post as secretary to Austin Robinson, an economist.

At the start of the 1960s, Baird moved into teaching, becoming head of geography at The Hertfordshire and Essex High School in Bishop's Stortford, and serving additionally as deputy headteacher from 1973 to 1975. She became active in the Association of Assistant Mistresses, serving as its president from 1976. In 1978, this merged with the Association of Assistant Masters in Secondary Schools to form the Assistant Masters and Mistresses Association, Baird becoming joint general secretary. She was also active in the International Federation of Secondary Teachers.

Baird retired in 1990 and became the vice-president of the National Foundation for Educational Research. In 1991, she was made an Officer of the Order of the British Empire. She also served on Cambridge City Council as a Liberal Democrat from 1992 to 1996.

Trade union offices
Preceded by New position	General Secretary of the Assistant Masters and Mistresses Association; 1978–1990; With: Andrew Hutchings (1978–1979); Geoff Beynon (1979–1988); Peter Smith (1988–1990)	Succeeded by Peter Smith
Preceded by Otto Kaltenborn	President of the International Federation of Secondary Teachers; 1981–1985	Succeeded by Ernst Kiel
