= Geoff Beynon =

British trade union leader (1926–2012)

Ernest Geoffrey Beynon (4 October 1926 – 21 October 2012) was a British trade union leader.

Born in Sheerness in Kent, Beynon attended Borden Grammar School, then the University of Bristol, from which he received a degree in mathematics. After completing National Service with the Royal Artillery, he returned to Bristol where he qualified as a teacher. He worked at Thornbury Grammar School and then St George Grammar School (near St George's Park) in Bristol. He joined the Assistant Masters' Association (AMA), and from 1964 worked as its full-time Assistant Secretary. In 1978, the AMA merged with the Association of Assistant Mistresses to form the Assistant Masters and Mistresses Association, and Beynon became its joint general secretary the following year.

As joint leader of the union, Beynon championed the introduction of a "conscience clause", meaning that even if the union voted to take industrial action, individual members could decide not to take part. In 1986, he signed the Teachers' Pay and Conditions Bill, which removed union negotiating rights and introduced performance-related pay, something he described as one of his "most difficult decisions". He represented the union on the Burnham Committee for many years, and was its chair from 1985 until it was abolished in 1987. During his time as joint general secretary, membership of the union increased from 80,000 to 120,000, principally through efforts being made for the first time to recruit primary school teachers.

Beynon retired in 1987, thereafter serving on a number of committees, including the executive of the Welwyn Garden City Society.

Trade union offices
Preceded by Joyce Baird and Andrew Hutchings	General Secretary of the Assistant Masters and Mistresses Association; 1979–1987; With: Joyce Baird	Succeeded by Joyce Baird and Peter Smith
