= Andrew Hutchings =

British trade union leader (1907–1996)

Andrew William Seymour Hutchings CBE (3 December 1907 – 30 October 1996) was a British trade union leader.

Hutchings studied at Cotham School in Bristol and then St Catharine's College, Cambridge, before becoming a teacher. His first appointment was assistant master at Downside School in 1929, he then moved to the Methodist College, Belfast and the Holt School in Liverpool. Active in the Assistant Masters' Association, he became its full-time assistant secretary in 1936, then its general secretary in 1939.

As leader of the union, Hutchings represented it on a number of other bodies; he was honorary secretary of the Joint Committee of Four Secondary Associations, and served on the executives of the World Confederation of Organisations of the Teaching Profession, the Secondary Schools Examinations Council and the Schools Council. He was secretary-general of the International Federation of Secondary Teachers from 1954 to 1965, then president until 1971, and again from 1972 to 1973. In 1973, he became chair of the National Foundation for Educational Research (NFER).

In 1978, Hutchings took the union into a merger with the Association of Assistant Mistresses, forming the Assistant Masters and Mistresses Association, and he served as joint general secretary for the first few months. He then stood down, becoming chair of the executive of the Associated Examining Board. In 1983, he became vice-president of NFER, and he remained involved with the Associated Board, latterly as a vice president.

Trade union offices
| Preceded by G. D. Dunkerley | General Secretary of the Assistant Masters' Association; 1939–1978 | Succeeded by Position abolished |
| Preceded by Janet M. Lawson | General Secretary of the International Federation of Secondary Teachers; 1954–1965 | Succeeded by Émile Hombourger |
| Preceded by H. Reinhardt | President of the International Federation of Secondary Teachers; 1965–1973 | Succeeded by Franz Ebner |
| Preceded by New position | General Secretary of the Assistant Masters and Mistresses Association; 1978; With: Joyce Baird | Succeeded by Joyce Baird and Geoff Beynon |
