= Malta Union of Teachers =

Maltese trade-union

- The Malta Union of Teachers
- Founded: 1919
- Headquarters: Ħamrun, Malta
- Location: Malta
- Members: over 10,000
- Key people: Marco Bonnici, President; Elaine Germani, Senior Vice President; Christopher Vella, Vice President; Carmen Dimech, Assistant General Secretary
- Affiliations: ETUC, Education International, FOR.U.M.
- Website: www.mut.org.mt

The Malta Union of Teachers (MUT) is the longest established trade-union in Malta.

The MUT stands as the largest sectoral trade union in Malta, representing educators and allied professionals across the whole spectrum of education: from kindergarten up to university level. The MUT is affiliated with FOR.U.M., ETUCE and EI, and is a very active trade-union participating in various local and international fora related to education, industrial relations and related subjects.

The MUT launched various initiatives, notable amongst which was an attempt to unite the local trade union movement within a TUC in 2008.

== The first registered Trade Union ==
Since its foundation in 1919 the Malta Union of Teachers (MUT) has grown both in its stature as an organization at the national level and in its membership strength. The Union started with just over 600 members and today the MUT is over 9000 strong, representing all grades of teachers in the public and private sectors from Kindergarten to University. Over the years the MUT developed its dual role of a strong and effective trade union and an experienced professional educational organization.

== The Beginning ==
The MUT owes its origin to the developments following 7 June 1919 riots which were sparked by the misery in which the Maltese workers were living at the time. In an effort to calm the situation a Commission was set up specifically to review the salaries of government employees. In its report, which was published on 5 November 1919, the Commission recommended salary increases for all categories of workers except teachers. Suffice it to say that during the first two decades of the 20th century, the standards of education and the condition of work of Maltese teachers were in a pathetic state.

Against the backdrop of this reality a young 29-year-old teacher, Antonio Galea from Valletta, took the initiative and called all teachers in Malta to unite and fight for their rights. Over 500 teachers from various towns and villages around Malta responded to Antonio Galea's call and converged on the Floriana Primary School for a special foundation meeting held on 22 November 1919. The meeting was addressed by two of Antonio Galea's staunchest supporters, Joseph Giordano and Rogantino Cachia who were elected as the MUT's first President and first Secretary respectively. Antonio Galea became the Union's Organizer. Subsequent to this meeting the MUT became the first registered trade union in Malta.

Conscious of its moral obligations the MUT has, since its origin, realized the need to strike a balance between its member's rights and their responsibilities. This explains why the MUT took up a dual role, namely that of a trade union and a professional organization.

== Trade Unionistic Role ==
The MUT's role as a trade-union and its successes in this field need hardly be stressed. Teachers know that they can rely on their union when it comes to negotiations on salaries and conditions of work. In fact, the MUT managed to obtain salary increases for teachers in 1947, 1953, 1955, 1959 and 1962. In the late 60's the MUT scored another success in its representations with the Salaries Anomalies Commission. In 1974 the MUT negotiated another Reorganization Agreement but the Union's greatest achievement was registered in 1988 through the enactment of the Education Act by which teaching was given official recognition as a profession. This was followed by an agreement with the government which translated this recognition into tangible terms. More recently teachers consolidated their position through a Public Service Reform agreement signed in August 1994. This was followed by an Addendum to the Classification and Grading Agreement of the Education Class signed in February 2001.

== Professional Body ==
The MUT's role as a professional organization, particularly its interest in the professional development of teachers, was evident from the early years of the Union's life. In fact, this was clearly one of the first items on the MUT's agenda and as far back as the early 1920s the MUT highlighted the inadequacies of the training school for teachers of the time and submitted proposals regarding the need of a Chair of Pedagogy at the University of Malta. However, it was only after the war that two well organized training colleges were set up. Eventually these two colleges merged into one Institute and were transferred to the University of Malta under the Faculty of Education in the early 1980s.

In an attempt to highlight, discuss and propose solutions to the problems facing the various sectors of our educational system the MUT has, over the years, organized various seminars, fora and conferences on educational issues. The MUT also regularly publishes its views on particular aspects of topical interest in education.

== MUT's Affiliations ==
National

For.U.M. - The Forum of Maltese Unions is a confederation of Maltese Unions which was established in 2004. The confederation immediately started contributing on a national scale when it was involved in discussions with the Maltese Government and other Unions on a way forward to reach an agreement on the social pact. The Malta Union of Teachers joined the confederation in 2008 and is the largest Union in For.U.M. Today the For.U.M. has fourteen Union affiliates with a total membership of 16,000 workers from different professions and spheres in all the spectrum of the Maltese society. The confederation participates actively in all national debates and activities that concern the conditions and right of workers and their families.

International

Education International, EI - The Malta Union of Teachers is a member of the EI, established on 26 January 1993 as an amalgamation of the WCOTP, the World Confederation of Organizations of the Teaching Profession, and the IFFTU, the International Federation of Free Teachers Unions.

European Trade Union Committee for Education, ETUCE - The Malta Union of Teachers is a member of the ETUCE which was established in 1981 in Brussels as a trade secretariat of the teachers organizations under the European Trade Union Committee, or the ETUC.

EIE and ETUCE have common interests and therefore continuous cooperation is necessary to avoid duplication of activities.

== MUT Presidents and General Secretaries ==
The MUT had thirteen presidents and nine full-time general secretaries since its foundation in 1919:

Presidents:

Joseph Giordano: 1919-1920;1925-1926
Rogantino Cachia: 1920-1921; 1922–1924; 1927-1936
Nazzareno Pisani: 1937
Anthony Cachia: 1938-1942
Francis X. Mangion: 1943-1946
Emanuel Tonna: 1947-1948
Alfred Buhagiar: 1949-1962
Evarist Saliba: 1962-1963
Abel Giglio: 1963-1974
Alfred J. Buhagiar: 1974-1996
John M. Bencini: 1996-2011
Kevin Bonello: 2011-2017
Marco Bonnici: 2017-

General Secretaries:

Joseph Agius Cutajar: 1942-1950

  Victor deDomenico: 1950-1951 

Francis William Fenech: 1951-1953
Joseph Madiona: 1954-1956
Joseph Wismayer: 1956-1959
Alfred Baldacchino: 1959-1960
Alphonse M. Farrugia: 1961-1991
Joseph Degiovanni: 1991-2007
Franklin Barbara: 2007-2017
Carmen Dimech: 2017-
