= Motofumi Makieda =

Japanese trade union leader

Motofumi Makieda (Japanese: 槙枝元文, 4 March 1921 – 4 December 2010) was a Japanese trade union leader.

Makieda qualified as a teacher during World War II, then taught at a junior high school. After the war, he was a founding member of the Japan Teachers' Union (JTU), and became its general secretary in 1962, and then president in 1971, in which role he promoted education for peace. In 1974, he led the union in a national strike. As it was illegal for teachers to strike, he was imprisoned, being released following an international campaign. From 1976, he was additionally president of the General Council of Trade Unions of Japan (Sohyo). In 1978, he was elected as president of the World Confederation of Organizations of the Teaching Profession, serving until 1982, during which time he built links between the federation and the rival International Federation of Free Teachers' Unions.

Makieda retired in 1983, and thereafter devoted his time to the Japan-China Friendship Society. He also supported the merger of Sohyo into RENGO, a new trade union federation.

Trade union offices
Preceded by Miyanohara Sadamitsu	President of the Japan Teachers' Union; 1971–1983	Succeeded by Shoju Ohba
Preceded by Makoto Ichikawa	President of the General Council of Trade Unions of Japan; 1976–1983	Succeeded by Takeshi Kurokawa
Preceded by Wilhelm Ebert	President of the World Confederation of Organizations of the Teaching Profession; 1978–1982	Succeeded by Jim Killeen
