= Marie Egeberg =

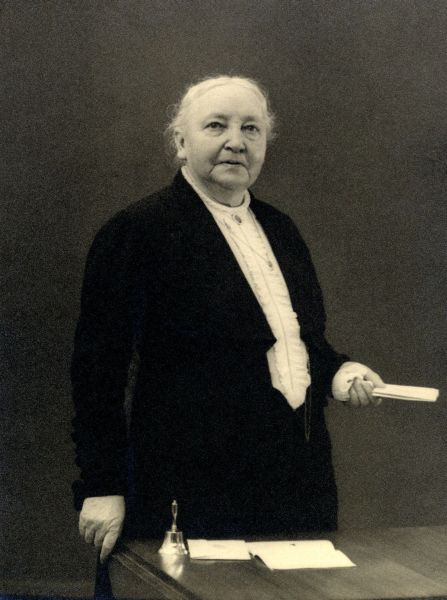
Marie Egeberg

Ane Marie Johansen Egeberg (1865–1952) was a Danish schoolteacher and women's rights activist. Based in Vejle, she established the local branch of the Danish Women's Society which she headed for 16 years. On the political front, from 1924 she was a member of the municipal council representing the liberal party Venstre.

== Biography ==
Born on 13 March 1865 in Holtum near Vejle in Jutland's Vejle Municipality, Ane Marie Johansen Egeberg was the daughter of Johannes Rasmussen Egeberg (1819–1968), a farmer, and Karen Marie Jensen (born 1813). She completed her education in 1893 with a teaching diploma from N. Zahle's School in Copenhagen.

She embarked on her 40-year-long teaching career at Sebbersund near Nibe in 1895. She continued at a school in Svinninge near Holbæk until 1903 when she returned to her native Vejle. For the next 30 years she was employed by the municipality as a teacher specializing in Danish and arithmetic. She taught first at Søndermarksskolen until 1917, then at Klostergades School and finally at Langelinies Skole until she retired in 1933. She took a constructive interest in the children she taught, both in the classroom and in the community.

While at Langelinies Skole, she came in contact with Marie Munch and Christine Plov who were both active in the women's movement. As a result, she gave her support to a call for equal pay for men and women teachers which led to her becoming a member of the local suffrage committee Købstadlærerindernes Valgforbund, a branch of the Danish Union of Teachers. She also served on the board of the church-based Kristelig Forening for Unge Kvinder (KFUK) where she devoted her interest to the Inner Mission. In 1912, she became a member of the board of the central Lærerindernes Missionsforbund, (Women Teachers' Mission Association).

In 1915, Egeberg established the Velje brand of the Danish Women's Society, serving from 1920 to 1940 as its chair. She was also a member of the main organization's board from 1924 to 1937. In the 1920s, she was instrumental in founding the Women's Building (Kvindernes Bygning) in Vejle which was purchased by the Women's Society in 1931. It was here she lived when she retired. Politically, she belonged to the Venstre party. While serving on the Vejle Municipal Council from 1925 to 1929, she defended women's rights and fought against the tendency to exclude women from positions in the public service.

Marie Egeberg died in Vejle on 29 July 1952. Her funeral attracted many members of the Women's Society, some of whom carried her coffin to the grave.

== Legacy ==
Egeberg is remembered as one of the leading figures in the women's movement in Vejle and as an important representative of provincial women's activism in Denmark during the early 20th century. Through her long association with the Danish Women's Society, she contributed to the expansion of women's political participation and civic engagement in eastern Jutland.
