= Thistley Hough Academy =

Secondary school in Stoke-on-Trent, England

Location
- Thistley Hough; Stoke-on-Trent, Staffordshire, ST4 5JJ; England
- Coordinates: 53°00′00″N 2°12′08″W

Information
- Type: Academy
- Established: 1938
- Local authority: Stoke-on-Trent City Council
- Trust: Creative Education Trust
- Department for Education URN: 139068 Tables
- Ofsted: Reports
- Principal: Noel Kennedy
- Gender: Coeducational
- Age: 11 to 16
- Enrolment: 966
- Website: thistleyhoughacademy.org.uk

Thistley Hough Academy is a coeducational secondary school located in the village of Penkhull in Stoke-on-Trent, Staffordshire, England. The school was built in 1938 as a girls' grammar school, housed in a classical Art Deco building. The old building has since been demolished and a new £15,000,000 school has been constructed. In September 2011, the new building's opening ceremony took place. The new building was opened in May 2013 by the Chairman of Stoke City Football Club, Peter Coates.

== Admissions ==
Admissions are non-selective. Students can be of any religion or none, and the school does not provide religious instruction. Though the school was initially a girls' school, the school now admits male pupils.

== History ==
The school was first opened in 1938. The current academy colour is purple, date from the school's inception as a grammar school for girls. The first headmistress, Miss Bamber, was a member of the suffragette movement. Local pottery companies donated pieces of pottery for the school's reception area. The pottery is still displayed in the school library today.

=== Site ===
In the 1970s, the school was expanded. The new section cost £2 million.

In 1994, the school was refurbished.

In 2013, the new buildings were constructed as part of the government's Building Schools for the Future scheme. The site of the demolished old school was converted into parking space and sports facilities. The school was reopened under head teacher Holly Hartley.

=== Robert Haines ===
In 2014, former head teacher Robert Haines jailed for 16 months for 8 child sex offences. He had been suspended in 2012 as allegations came to light, and admitted his offences in the Stoke-on-Trent Crown Court.

== Local Community ==
Abnormally high amounts of students are excluded from schools in the school's county. Despite the high cost at £5000 per pupil, in the 2018/2019 academic year 185 pupils were excluded from Staffordshire schools. Pupils are most often excluded from secondary schools, and were transferred from their last school with unaddressed "complex learning and behavioural needs".

There has often been complaints about pupils' "anti-social" behaviour in the local area. In 2019, increased numbers of local police were sent to patrol the school and its immediate surrounding area.

== Sponsors ==
Thistley Hough Academy was established in September 2013 in partnership with the Creative Education Trust (CET). CET is a charity and social enterprise set up in 2011.

Thistley Hough has adopted the 'Admissions Criteria for Community Schools' as determined by Stoke-on-Trent Education Service.

1. Children who are in the care of a local authority
2. Children who have older brothers or sisters at the school at the time that they will start.
3. Children who live nearest to the school as determined by a straight line measurement from the front door of the child's home address to the main entrance of the school.

== Notable alumni ==
- Neil Morrissey, actor

=== Thistley Hough Girls' School ===
- Chris Keates, General Secretary since 2004 of the NASUWT
- Ann Savours Shirley, writer and historian
