= Sagħtar =

Maltese magazine

- Cover of the last printed issue of Sagħtar (December 2015)
- Categories: Education
- Frequency: Monthly
- Circulation: 6,000
- Publisher: Moviment Qawmien Letterarju (1971-1976); Malta Union of Teachers (1976- )
- First issue: January 1971
- Country: Malta
- Language: Maltese
- Website: Facebook.com/saghtar

Sagħtar is a Maltese magazine published by the Malta Union of Teachers. It is published monthly during the school year, and is intended mainly for use within Maltese primary and secondary schools. Its content ranges from information regarding current local and international topics, to Maltese literature. In Maltese sagħtar refers to wild thyme, and also to the striated pardalote.

== Overview ==
Sagħtar was first published in 1971, having been started by the "Moviment Qawmien Letterarju". In 1976, it was handed to the Malta Union of Teachers (MUT). The final issue of the printed Sagħtar was published in December 2015, and the printed version of the magazine was discontinued due to high printing costs. The MUT planned to decide on the future of the magazine and restarted issuing it as an online version as from October 2020.

Many Maltese schools use Sagħtar as part of a Maltese lesson. Indeed, it is used both to encourage students to read Maltese, and to teach students about topics which may be featured in that particular edition.
