= Samuel M. Lambert =

American labor leader (died 1991)

Executive secretary of the National Education Association
- In office August 1, 1967 – 1972
- Preceded by: William George Carr

Personal details
- Born: 1912 or 1913 Canebrake, West Virginia, U.S.
- Died: April 9, 1991 (aged 78) Washington, D.C., U.S.
- Spouse: Juanita Bates
- Children: 2
- Education: West Virginia University (Bachelor's degree, master's degree); George Washington University (EdD)
- Occupation: Labor leader

Samuel M. Lambert (died April 9, 1991) was an American labor leader who served as the executive secretary of the National Education Association during the administration of U.S. President Richard Nixon. Due to the political power wielded by the group, as well as their opposition to federal funding for parochial schools, Lambert was placed on Nixon's enemies list.

== Early life and education ==
Lambert was a native of Canebrake, West Virginia. He grew up in Bluefield, West Virginia.

Lambert received a bachelor's degree and a master's degree from West Virginia University before obtaining a Doctor of Education at George Washington University.

== Career ==
Prior to joining the National Education Association (NEA), Lambert taught high school mathematics and social studies in Bluefield. He also served as director of research for the West Virginia Education Association.

Lambert worked for the NEA for 22 years. He began serving as assistant research director in 1950, research director in 1956, and assistant executive secretary in 1965. On August 1, 1967, Lambert succeeded William George Carr as the organization's executive secretary, serving until his retirement in 1972. During Lambert's tenure as executive secretary, the NEA comprised more than one million school teachers and administrators and was increasing by more than 1,000 members per week. Under Lambert's direction, the organization sought to expand its political bargaining power by opening hundreds of regional offices.

== Personal life and death ==
Lambert was married to Juanita Bates and had two daughters. He was a member of the Classroom Teachers Association, the American Association of School Administrators, the National Association of State Educators, and the National Association of Elementary School Principals.

Lambert died of cancer at the age of 78 at his home in Washington, D.C., on April 9, 1991.

== See also ==
- Master list of Nixon's political opponents

Business positions
Preceded by William George Carr	Executive secretary of the National Education Association; 1967–1972	Succeeded by —
