= NFPW =

NFPW may stand for:

- National Federation of Press Women, an American professional organization
- National Federation of Professional Workers, a former British trade union federation
