= Danish Union of Teachers =

Trade union in Denmark

- Danish Union of Teachers
- Danmarks Lærerforening
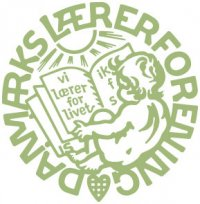
- Founded: 1874
- Headquarters: Copenhagen, Denmark
- Location: Denmark
- Members: 81,000 (2025)
- Key people: Gordon Ørskov Madsen (President)
- Affiliations: FH, DLI NLS, ETUCE, EI
- Website: www.dlf.org

The Danish Union of Teachers (Danish: Danmarks Lærerforening or DLF) is a trade union in Denmark.

The union primarily represents teachers in primary and lower secondary public education.

The union was founded in 1874. In 1952, it became affiliated to the Confederation of Professionals in Denmark, and since 2019, it has been part of its successor, the Danish Trade Union Confederation (FH). Danish Union of Teachers is also affiliated with Danish Teacher Trade Unions (DLI), Nordic Teachers´ Council (NLS), European Trade Union Committee for Education (ETUCE) and Education International (EI).
