= Peter Smith (trade unionist) =

Teacher and union leader from the United Kingdom (1940–2006)

Peter Anthony Smith CBE (25 June 1940 – 10 February 2006) was a British trade unionist who served as General Secretary of the Association of Teachers and Lecturers (ATL) in the United Kingdom from 1988 to 2002.

== Biography ==
Peter Smith was an English teacher at Trinity School of John Whitgift from 1966 to 1974.

At the beginning of his tenure, the ATL was a small trade union in a sector traditionally dominated by two large unions, the National Union of Teachers and the National Association of Schoolmasters Union of Women Teachers.

"Shrewd and sensible, if somewhat offbeat in style, Smith became an influential figure during an important era for education: the introduction of the national curriculum, national testing and regular school inspections all took place while he was in charge of the ATL, and he sought to guide his members to a responsible position on all of these difficult issues." — Daily Telegraph, 13 February 2006.

Smith is credited with tripling the membership of the organisation. He was appointed a CBE in 2003 for services to education.

Smith died from esophageal cancer on 10 February 2006, at the age of 65. He was survived by his wife, Anne, whom he married in 1961, and by their son and daughter.

Trade union offices
Preceded by Joyce Baird and Geoff Beynon	General Secretary of the Association of Teachers and Lecturers; 1988–2002; With: Joyce Baird (1988–1990)	Succeeded by Mary Bousted
