= Scottish Secondary Teachers' Association =

Scottish trade union

SSTA
- Scottish Secondary Teachers' Association
- Founded: 1944; 82 years ago
- Headquarters: Edinburgh
- Location: Scotland
- Members: ▲5,966 (2024)
- General Secretary: Seamus Searson
- President: Monique Dreon-Goold
- Key people: Iain Glennie, AGS and Euan Duncan, AGS
- Affiliations: EI,GFTU
- Website: www.ssta.org.uk

Scottish Secondary Teachers' Association
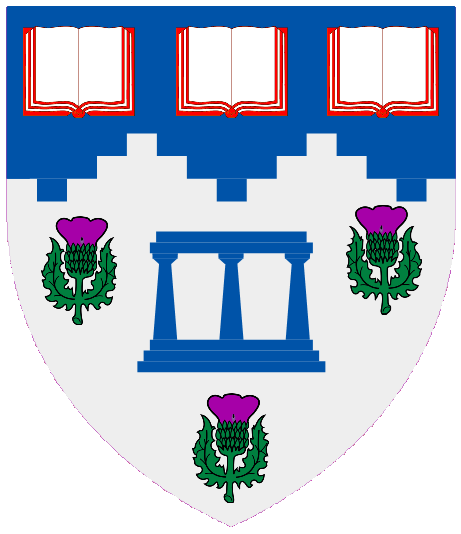
- Recorded in 1965

The Scottish Secondary Teachers' Association (SSTA) is Scotland's second largest teachers' union. It was created to focus on secondary education issues in reaction to the perception of national influence exercised by the primary education sector.

The SSTA is affiliated to Education International.

== Aims ==
The SSTA claims that it aims to advance education in Scotland and promote the interests of Scottish secondary teachers.

In recent years it has campaigned for a reduction in the excessive workload secondary teachers face. It also regularly raises the issue of the violence teachers face at work, and issues of growing levels of poor behaviour in schools.

== Past presidents ==
- 1944 - J G Lindsey M.A, B.Sc, F.R.S.E.
- 1945 - James Porter M.A.
- 1947 - W M L Dewar M.A.
- 1949 - Agnes McKendrick M.A.
- 1951 - Alexander Allan M.A.
- 1953 - Alexander R Robertson M.A.
- 1955 - Arthur D Brown B.Com.
- 1957 - James Docherty M.A.
- 1959 - J N C Clark M.A., Ph.D.
- 1961 - Albert Anderson M.A B.Sc.
- 1963 - James Miller M.A., B.Sc.
- 1965 - David Low B.Sc.
- 1967 - Neil Foggie D.A.
- 1969 - Gladys M Cairns M.A.
- 1971 - John Vallely M.A., B.A.
- 1973 - E R Landsman M.A.
- 1975 - L H Inglis Dip.Tech
- 1977 - J McD Roy D.A.
- 1979 - Alistair B Fulton M.A.
- 1981 - John D Gray M.A M.Sc.
- 1983 - Douglas Campbell M.A.
- 1985 - Donald C Halliday B.Sc.
- 1987 - Thomas Wallace B.Sc.
- 1989 - Ian M Goldsack M.A.
- 1991 - John Small B.Ed.
- 1993 - Marie T Allan M.A
- 1995 - Barbara E Clark M.A.
- 1997 - William A L Guthrie B.Sc.
- 1999 - William S Fitzpatrick B.A.
- 2001 - George M T Sturrock M.A.
- 2003 - Alan McKenzie M.A.
- 2005 - Albert F S McKay B.Sc.
- 2007 - Ann L Ballinger B.A.
- 2009 - Peter Wright M.A.
- 2011 - Margaret Smith B.A., B.Ed.
- 2013 - James B Forbes M.A.
- 2015 - Euan Duncan B.A.
- 2017 - Kevin Campbell B.Sc.
- 2019 - John Guidi B.Sc.
- 2021 - Catherine Nicol B.Sc.
- 2023 - Stuart Hunter

== See also ==
- Education in Scotland
- Trade Unions in Scotland
