= Forum of Maltese Unions =

The Forum of Maltese Unions (Maltese: Forum Unions Maltin, FOR.U.M.) is a national trade union federation in Malta incorporating 16,000 members representing workers from a variety of professions and trades.

== History ==
The federation was established in 2004, providing an alternative to the General Workers' Union and the Confederation of Malta Trade Unions (CMTU). Its initial affiliates were eight small, independent unions. In 2009, the Malta Union of Teachers joined FOR.U.M., increasing at the time its total affiliated membership to 11,000. It affiliated to the European Trade Union Confederation in 2011.

Today, For.U.M. has 14 Union affiliates with a total membership of 13,000 workers from different professions and spheres. The Unions affiliated to the For.U.M. are AAE, ALPA, EPOU, ESSU, MUMN, MUT, UCC, UHBC, UMASA, UPAP, UPISP, and UTAC. This Confederation actively participates in all national debates and activities that concern the conditions and rights of workers and their families. For.U.M. is a member of MCESD and MEUSAC.

== Affiliates ==
Union	Abbreviation	Founded	Membership (2007)
Airline Pilots' Association	ALPA	1981	130
Association of Airline Engineers	AAE	2002	78
Enemalta Professional Officers' Union	EPOU		
Energy Senior Staff Union	ESSU		
Malta Union of Midwives and Nurses	MUMN	1991	2,494
Malta Union of Teachers	MUT	1946	7,136
Union Ħaddiema Bank Centrali	UHBC	1993	181
Union of Cabin Crew	UCC	1989	214
Union of Malta Environment and Planning Authority Professional Staff	UPAP	1995	139
Union of State Employed Architects and Civil Engineers	UPISP	1991	64
Union Technical and Clerical - MEPA	UTAC		
University of Malta Academic Staff Association	UMASA	2004	264
