= William George Carr =

American labor leader (1901–1996)

Executive secretary of the National Education Association
- In office August 1, 1952 – August 1, 1967
- Succeeded by: Samuel M. Lambert

Personal details
- Born: 1901 Northampton, Northamptonshire, England
- Died: March 1, 1996 (aged 94–95) Denver, Colorado, U.S.
- Spouse: Elizabeth Vaughan (m. 1924; died 1983)
- Children: 1
- Education: University of California, Los Angeles (Bachelor's degree); Stanford University (Master's degree, PhD)
- Occupation: Educator, author, labor leader

William George Carr (1901 – March 1, 1996) was an educator and author who is most known for being the Executive Secretary (chief administrator) of the National Education Association from 1952 to 1967. He was the teaching consultant for the U.S. delegation to the charter meetings for the United Nations and UNESCO in 1945 and 1946. He also served as General Secretary and President of the World Confederation of Organizations of the Teaching Profession from 1946 to 1972.

== Early life ==
Carr was born in Northampton, England, to Mr. and Mrs. Alfred Sutton Carr. While he was a child, the family immigrated to Canada in 1906. They lived in Red Deer, Alberta. The family moved again, this time to Los Angeles, California when his father (a cabinet maker) became a consultant to the movie industry on authentic period furniture.

== Education and early career ==
He graduated with his bachelor's degree from the University of California at Los Angeles. While at UCLA he was president of Delta Sigma Chi local fraternity and oversaw it becoming a chapter of Sigma Pi fraternity. He was also a member of the varsity debating team and track team. After attaining his bachelor's degree he married Elizabeth Vaughan, of Los Angeles in September 1924.

Upon graduation, Carr taught at the Roosevelt Junior High School in Glendale, California in 1924. At the same time he began working on his master's degree which he attained from Stanford University in 1926. He then became the Head of the Education Department at Pacific University for a year. In 1927, he took a position as Research Director for the California Teachers Association and began working on his Ph.D from Stanford. He earned his Ph.D. in 1929 where his dissertation was a biography of John Swett.

== NEA and professional life ==
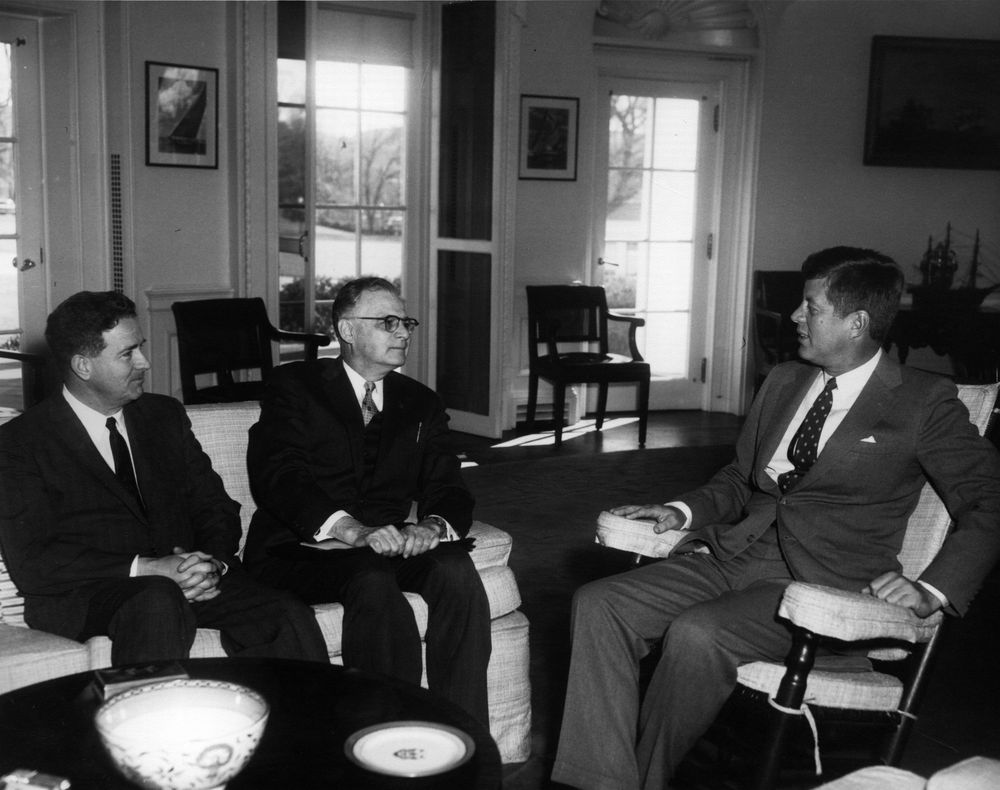
Carr (center), with Commissioner of Education Steve McMurrin (left) and President Kennedy, 1962

In 1929, Carr moved to Washington D.C. to become the Assistant Research Director for the National Education Association. He was named Research Director for the group in 1931. In 1940 he was appointed to the role of Associate Secretary and Secretary of the Policies Commission for the NEA and the AUSA. In 1945, he attended the charter meetings for the United Nations and UNESCO as a teaching consultant for the official delegation of the United States. He served as the deputy to the chairperson and consultant on the committee responsible for writing the charter that created each organization. In 1946, he was named General Secretary of the World Confederation of Organizations of the Teaching Profession (WCOTP) and became a consultant for UNESCO. He later worked to help write an early draft of the Universal Declaration of Human Rights. His view in the 1940s was that the United States needed to end its isolationist tendencies by teaching that the country "is now and forever bound up in the affairs of the world."

On January 26, 1952, the NEA announced that Carr would be its new Executive Secretary, effective August 1, 1952. During his tenure, he became an increasingly powerful voice on education policy and pushed for increased Federal aid and other benefits to education. He also advocated for "systematic education for home and family life," in which he proposed that schools adopt a curriculum to turn out more efficient consumers.

Carr was a member of the American-Korean Mission to aid in rebuilding the educational system of South Korea at the end of the Korean War in 1953.

In 1962, he met with President John F. Kennedy and Commissioner of Education Sterling McMurrin to discuss education policy.

In 1966, Carr oversaw the merger of the NEA with the American Teachers Association.

During his time at the NEA he was awarded the many honorary degrees including: LL.D. degree, honoris causa, by Miami University in 1953; the L.H.D. degree honoris causa, by Columbia University in 1954 and by Boston University in 1957.

Carr was against the use of strikes by the NEA. He warned that strikes would destroy the public's trust in teachers. After he retired in 1967 the NEA began giving its full backing to affiliates who went on strike.

== Retirement ==
After retiring from the NEA, Carr became president of the Council on International Nontheatrical Events. The council is a clearinghouse for American-made nontheatrical films and videos for international film festivals. He stepped down from his role with the WCOTP in 1972. He was also a member of the U.S. Commission on the Bicentennial of the Constitution and a member of the Cosmos Club.

In 1983, his wife Elizabeth died. He moved to Denver, Colorado in 1994. He died in hospice care there in 1996. He was survived by one son, Wilfred James Carr, and three grandsons.

== Published books ==
- Education for World Citizenship – 1928
- International Frontiers in Education – 1944
- Education In A Changing Society – 1963
- The Continuing Education of William Carr. An Autobiography. - 1978
- Collecting My Thoughts - 1980
- The Oldest Delegate -- Franklin in the Constitutional Convention. – 1990
