= Patrick Roach (trade unionist) =

British trade unionist

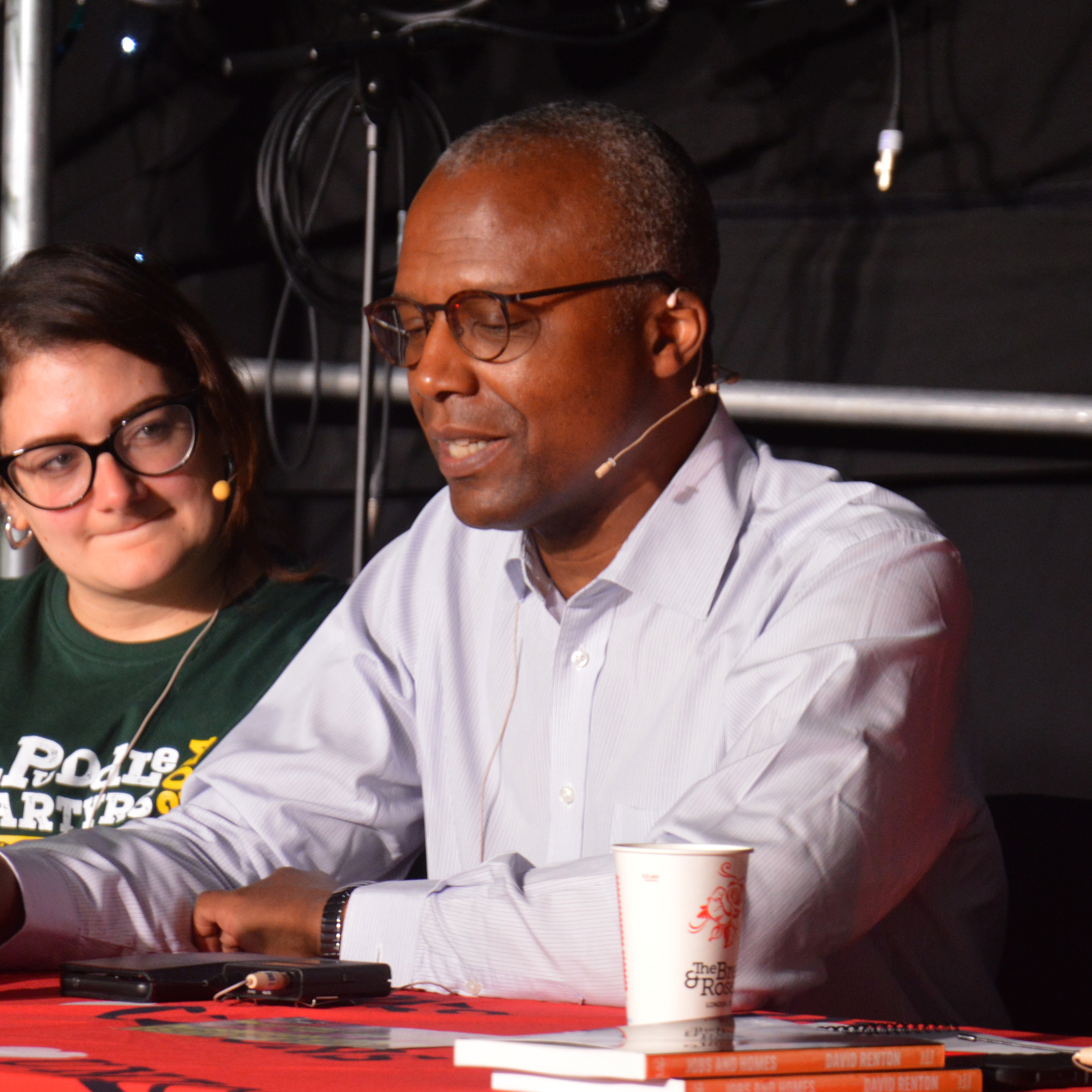
Patrick Roach

Patrick Roach CBE (born 1964) is a British trade unionist.

Roach was born in Walsall to parents who had immigrated from Jamaica. He hoped to become a schoolteacher but did not secure the grades to attend university, so went to Matthew Boulton College. Obtaining higher grades, he was able to study education at the University of Leicester, before becoming a teacher in colleges of further education. He completed a doctorate in educational research at the University of Warwick, then became a university lecturer in social policy.

In 1998, Roach began working for the NASUWT union, which represents schoolteachers, then in 2010 became the union's deputy general secretary. From 2017, he also served on the General Council of the Trades Union Congress.

In 2020, he became the NASUWT general secretary without facing a contest, as no other candidate received enough nominations to stand. He was appointed to lead the anti-racism response of the Trades Union Congress in the wake of the murder of George Floyd, Black Lives Matter and the COVID-19 pandemic. He led the establishment of the National education workforce partnership, Improving Education Together, with government, employers and unions. In 2024, Roach announced that he would not seek re-election in spring 2025.

Trade union offices
Preceded by Jerry Bartlett	Deputy General Secretary of the NASUWT; 2010–2020	Succeeded by Gareth Young
Preceded by Chris Keates	General Secretary of the NASUWT; 2020–2025	Succeeded by Matt Wrack
