= Independent Schools Education Association =

The Independent Schools Education Association Inc. (ISEA) is a union for teaching and non-teaching staff in independent or private schools in New Zealand. ISEA provides an employment advisory service to members as well as professional support. ISEA operates as many unions do and offers a membership facility and provides members' benefits and advocacy. ISEA assists staff in negotiating individual and collective employment agreements.

In 2007, ISEA celebrated forty years of existence. ISEA actively sought membership from non-teaching staff as well as teaching staff and its membership had increasingly grown. Also, in 2007 ISEA formed a partnership agreement with the NZ Educational Institute (NZEI) the union for state primary teachers. ISEA also enjoys a close association with the NZ Teachers Council, the Post Primary Teachers Association (PPTA) and the Combined Trades Union (CTU).

In 2008, ISEA changed its name from Independent Schools Teachers Association of New Zealand (ISTANZ) to ISEA in order to better reflect its evolving membership.

ISEA is also a member of The Council of Pacific Education (COPE) which is a regional organisation of education unions in the Pacific.

In 2009, ISEA was dealing with economic recession and supported its members in schools that were facing redundancies and closing.

== Acronyms ==
1. ISEA

2. ISTANZ

3. COPE

4. NZEI

5. CTU

6. PPTA
