= Chris Keates =

British trade unionist

Christine Mary Keates (born 10 October 1951) is a British trade unionist.

== Early life ==
Keates grew up in Stoke-on-Trent and attended Thistley Hough Girls' School, a girls' grammar school now called Thistley Hough Academy, before studying Archaeology and History at the University of Leicester, then completing a Postgraduate Certificate in Education at the University of Birmingham.

== Career ==
From 1974 until 1998, she worked as a teacher in Birmingham.

Keates was active in the National Association of Schoolmasters Union of Women Teachers (NASUWT), becoming the union's Assistant General Secretary in 1998, then Deputy General Secretary in 2001 and General Secretary in 2004. At the time, she was the only woman to lead any of the ten largest unions in the UK.

As leader of the NASUWT, Keates initially pursued a policy of co-operation with the Labour government, signing a workload agreement, in contrast to the rival National Union of Teachers (NUT). However, she was highly critical of the Conservative-led governments from 2010 onwards, working with the NUT to oppose changes which she described as an "unparalleled vicious assault" on teachers.

Keates also serves on the General Council of the Trades Union Congress.

Trade union offices
Preceded by Eamonn O'Kane	Deputy General Secretary of the National Association of Schoolmasters Union of Women Teachers; 2002 – 2004	Succeeded by Jerry Bartlett
Preceded by Eamonn O'Kane	General Secretary of the National Association of Schoolmasters Union of Women Teachers; 2004 – 2020	Succeeded by Patrick Roach
