= Council of Pacific Education =

The Council of Pacific Education (COPE) is a regional organisation of education unions from the South Pacific Region. COPE is a sub-branch of Education International's (EI) Asia and Pacific regional division. The COPE office is based in Suva, Fiji. The current Secretary General is Neselinda Meta.

== Affiliates ==
Australia
National Tertiary Education Union (NTEU)
Independent Education Union of Australia (IEU)
Australian Education Union (AEU)

Cook Islands
Cook Island Teachers' Union (CITU)

Fiji
Fijian Teachers' Association (FTA)
Fiji Teachers Union (FTU)
Association of the University of South Pacific Staff (AUSPS)

Kiribati
Kiribati Nation Union of Teachers (KNUT)

New Zealand

New Zealand Educational Institute (NZEI)
Post Primary Teachers' Association (PPTA)
Independent Schools Education Association of New Zealand (ISEA)
ASTE & AUS amalgamated to become Tertiary Education Union (TEU) effective 1 January 2009

Papua New Guinea
Papua New Guinea Teachers' Association (PNGTA)

Samoa
Samoa National Teachers' Association (SNTA)

Solomon Islands
Solomon Island National Teachers' Association (SINTA)

Tonga
Friendly Islands Teachers' Association (FITA)

Tuvalu
Tuvalu Teachers' Association (TTA)

Vanuatu
Vanuatu Teachers' Union (VTU)

Wallis and Futuna
FORCE Ouvriere Enseignement

== Activities ==
COPE provides advice and assistance on professional, industrial, legal and human rights issues for teachers, support staff and their representative union affiliates in the region. It also acts as a clearing house for information to both its affiliates and to other organisations across the Pacific and to Education International.

COPE hosts biennial conferences to address issues facing education in the South Pacific. In August, 2008 the Roundtable and 18th Biennial Conference was held in Nadi, Fiji, together with UNESCO and UNICEF, on "Improving the Status of Teachers as per International Labour Organization (ILO)-UNESCO's 1966 Recommendation and promoting Children's Rights to Quality Education".
The topics of discussion ranged from key issues and challenges in the pacific region concerning the status of teachers, to school leadership and obstacles to children's right to education specific to the region.
