= Shalom Levin =

Israeli politician (1916–1995)

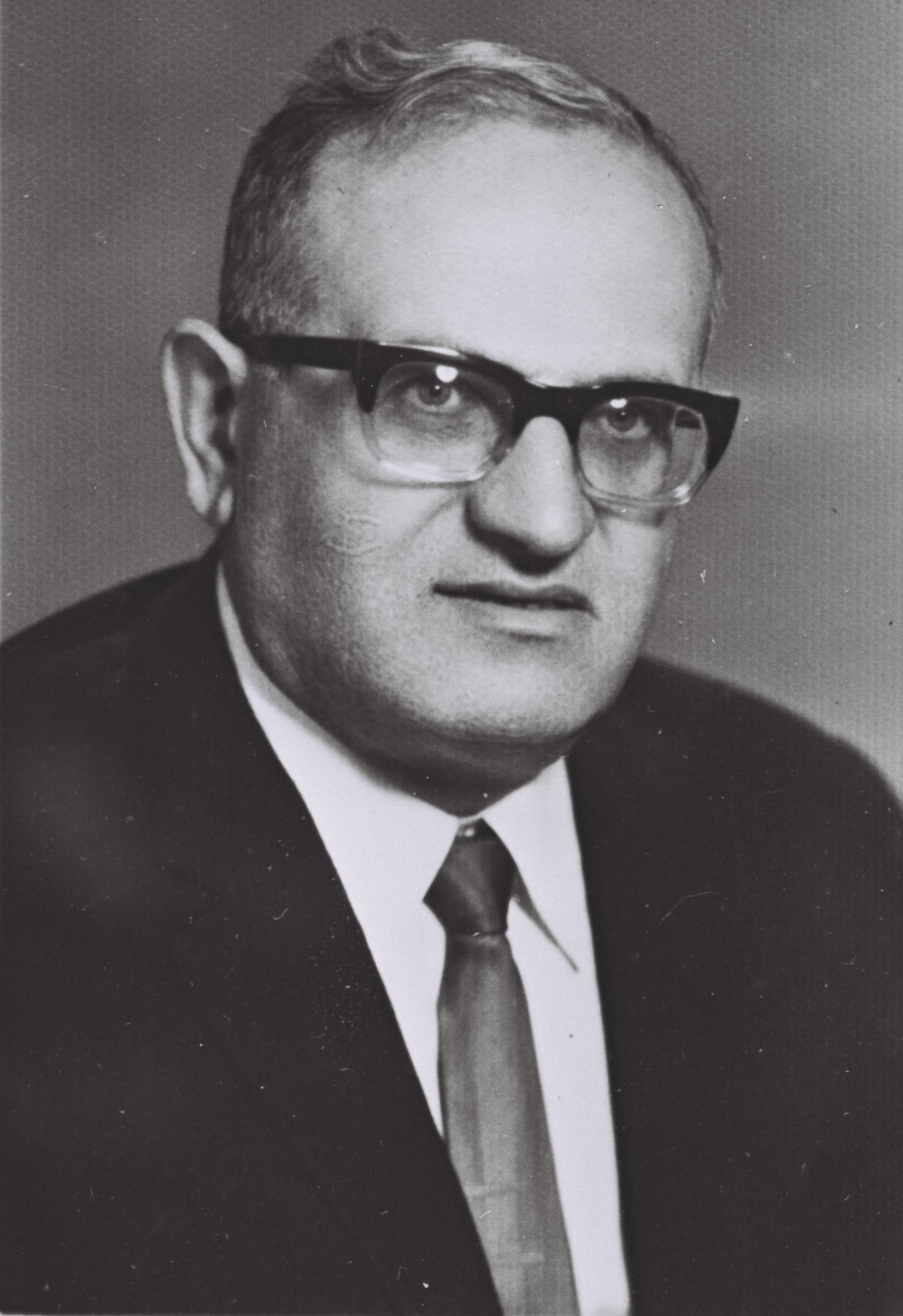
- Levin in 1969

Faction represented in the Knesset
- 1969–1977: Alignment

Personal details
- Born: 27 March 1916 Rakaŭ, Russian Empire
- Died: 14 April 1995 (aged 79)

Shalom Levin (Hebrew: שלום לוין; 27 March 1916 – 14 April 1995) was an Israeli teacher and politician who served as a member of the Knesset for the Alignment between 1969 and 1977.

== Biography ==
Born in Rakaŭ near Minsk in the Russian Empire (present-day Belarus) in 1916, Levin studied at the Tarbut Teachers Seminary in Vilnius, and was a member of the Jewish HeHalutz movement in Poland.

In 1937 he emigrated to Mandatory Palestine. He worked as a porter in Haifa Port but turned to teaching in Kfar Yehoshua and Deganya Alef. In 1948 he served as a soldier in under-siege Jerusalem and later as a Culture Officer. In 1952 he got an MA degree in bible, literature and the history of Israel at the Hebrew University of Jerusalem, earning there a PhD in philosophy of education in 1976. He served as general secretary of the Israel Teachers Union between 1955 and 1980, when he became its president until his death in 1995. Between 1963 and 1966 he also served as president of the International Federation of Teachers' Associations.

A member of the central committee and secretariat of Mapai, he was elected to the Knesset on the Alignment list in 1969, and was re-elected in 1973. He was not included in the Alignment list in the 1977 elections, when the Likud party defeated the Alignment and took over the government, and served as a member of the Histadrut's organising committee between 1977 and 1981.

He died in 1995.
