= Association for College Management =

Former trade union of the United Kingdom

The Association for College Management (ACM) was a trade union in the United Kingdom.

The union was founded in 1965 as the Association of Vice-Principals of Colleges, representing middle managers in colleges of further and higher education. In 1987, it was renamed the Association of College Management, its first general secretary was Wilson Longden. He was succeeded by John Mowbray. In 2001 he was succeeded by Peter Pendle, by which time it had adopted its final name. By 2002, it had 3,250 members and affiliated to the Trades Union Congress and the General Federation of Trade Unions. It had broadened its remit to represent all management grades in colleges, although it faced competition from the Secondary Heads Association.

In 2008, the union set up the Association of Managers in Education as a joint venture with the Association of Teachers and Lecturers (ATL), and the ACM became part of the ATL in January 2011.
