= Geoffrey Drain =

British trade unionist (1918–1993)

Geoffrey Ayrton Drain CBE (26 November 1918 – 2 April 1993) was a British trade union leader who was General Secretary of NALGO (the National and Local Government Officers Association) from 1973 to 1983, when it was the third largest trade union in the country.

Born in Preston, Lancashire, Drain studied law at Queen Mary College, London. After serving in World War II, he became assistant secretary at the Institute of Hospital Administrators in 1946, and became active in the Labour Party, standing unsuccessfully as their candidate in Chippenham in the 1950 General Election. In 1952, he began working for Milton Antiseptic, before being called to the bar as a barrister in 1955. He also remained active in local politics in Hampstead, London, and unsuccessfully attempted to have the Labour leader Hugh Gaitskell expelled from the constituency party when Gaitskell attempted to abandon the original version of Clause IV.

Initially a Bevanite, he joined NALGO as Deputy General Secretary in 1958, eventually becoming, in the words of the journalist Geoffrey Goodman, "the essence of a moderate, statesmanlike trade-union leader". In 1973 he became the union's General Secretary and a member of the TUC General Council. He supported the Wilson and Callaghan governments, and in 1978 was one of the influential trade union leaders appointed to the National Economic Development Council (known as "Neddy"). He retired from his positions in NALGO and the TUC in 1983.

He was a member of numerous influential committees covering health, local government, and the law, which "brought him into constant contact with a vast range of authority at all levels". He was a JP, Freeman of the City of London, a Treasurer of the European Movement UK and a director of the Bank of England from 1978 to 1986. He was appointed CBE in the 1981 New Year Honours. He died in 1993, aged 74.

Trade union offices
Preceded by Walter Anderson	Deputy General Secretary of the National Association of Local Government Officers; 1957–1973	Succeeded by George Newman
Preceded by Walter Anderson	General Secretary of the National Association of Local Government Officers; 1973–1983	Succeeded by John Daly
Preceded by Terry Casey	President of the National Federation of Professional Workers; 1973–1975	Succeeded by David Perryman
Preceded by Thomas Jackson	Trades Union Congress representative to the AFL–CIO; 1983	Succeeded by Bill Sirs
