= Joseph Itotoh =

Nigerian trade union leader and politician

Joseph Odidi Itotoh

Minister of State for Internal Affairs
- In office 2005–2006

Commissioner for Education, Edo State
- In office 1992–1995

Personal details
- Born: 18 May 1941 Uromi, Edo State, Nigeria
- Died: 27 September 2006
- Occupation: Educationist, trade unionist, politician

Joseph Odidi Itotoh (18 May 1941 – 27 September 2006) was a Nigerian trade union leader and politician.

Born in Uromi, Itotoh attended the Salvation Army School, then the Central Catholic School in Zaria, and the Annunciation Catholic College in Irrua. He became a schoolteacher, working first at the Pilgrim Baptist Grammar School in Ewohimi, then as principal at the Edo National College in Iguobazuwa, followed by a stint at the Immaculate Conception College in Benin City. From 1978 to 1981, he studied at the University of Ibadan, from which he received a doctorate.

Itotoh joined the Nigeria Union of Teachers, and served as its president from 1980 until 1986, and from 1981 also as president of the All-Africa Teachers' Organisation. In 1986, he became president of the World Confederation of Organisations of the Teaching Profession.

Itotoh served on the Teaching Service Commission in Bendel State, then the Committee for Education in Edo State. He was appointed Edo State Commissioner for Education between 1992 and 1995. In 2005, he was appointed as Minister of State for Internal Affairs. He became seriously ill in February 2006 and flew abroad for treatment. He returned to Nigeria in September and died shortly afterwards.

Trade union offices
Preceded by Jim Killeen	President of the World Confederation of Organisations of the Teaching Profession; 1986–1992	Succeeded by Federation merged
