= St Mary's College, Blackburn =

School in Lancashire, England

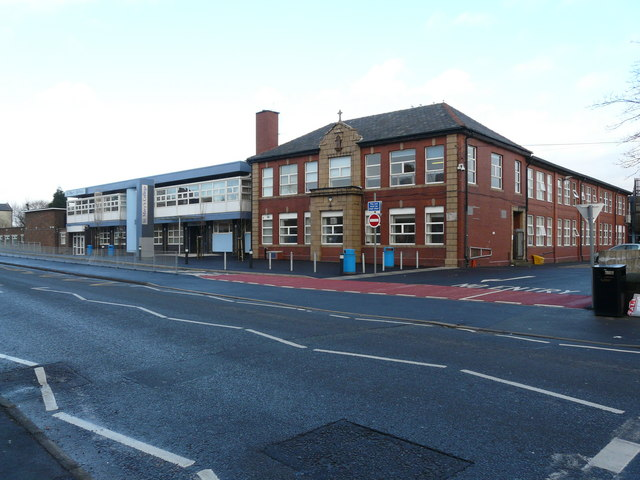
- St Mary's College, Shear Brow (B6233)

Location
- 53.7601°N 2.4869°W

Information
- Established: 1925
- Status: Closed
- Closed: July 31, 2022
- Department for Education URN: 130746 Tables
- Ofsted: Reports
- Head teacher: Elissa Best

St Mary's College was a school in Blackburn, Lancashire, England, from 1925 to 2022. It was established in 1925 by the Marist Fathers as a Catholic boys grammar school. It later became a sixth form college. The college closed on 31 July 2022.

== History ==
=== Grammar school ===
The college was founded by the Marist Fathers as a Catholic boys grammar school in 1925. The former football ground of Blackburn Olympic F.C. was subsequently acquired as a site for the school, which was known as St Mary's College RC Grammar School.

=== Sixth form college ===
The school became a co-educational Catholic sixth form college in 1978.

The Finley-Stokes Centre was opened in March 2005, named after former principal Michael Finley, who retired in 2008, and former deputy principal Peter Stokes, who died in 2004. The building was opened by former teacher Right Rev. Bishop Thomas Burns. A science block was opened in August 2007, named after a former headmaster, Father Graystone. A performing arts complex was opened in February 2008, named after former college principal, Rev. Kevin O'Neill. In 2017, allegations of sexual abuse perpetrated by O'Neill led the governing body to remove his name from the performing arts centre.

In 2017, allegations of sexual abuse perpetrated by the late Kevin O'Neill led the governing body to remove from the performing arts centre all mentions of O'Neill's name. A case study was submitted during 2020 to Independent Inquiry into Child Sexual Abuse, a statutory inquiry for England and Wales "The Marist Fathers Their culture and concealment of child sexual abuse, and the ‘watchdogs’ that refuse to watch, bark or bite."

St Mary's was the smallest sixth form college in the UK. It closed in August 2022 with £8 million of debt. The college said in a statement: "Despite good leadership and effective governance, St Mary’s have been unable to meet the financial challenges as a small standalone College".

== Alumni ==
- Sir Gerald Barling QC
- Thomas Burns (bishop)
- Mike Duxbury, footballer - Manchester United and England
- Anthony Green, actor
- John Hopkins, landscape architect (Olympic Park, 2012)
- Brian Miller (footballer) - Burnley and England. Manager - Burnley FC
- Greg Pope, Labour MP for Hyndburn
- Sir John Skehel, virologist
- Fred Smithies, trade union leader
- AJ Odudu TV Presenter
