= Nigel de Gruchy =

British trade unionist (1943–2025)

Nigel Ronald Anthony de Gruchy (28 January 1943 – 29 November 2025) was a British trade union official.

== Early life and career ==
De Gruchy was born on Jersey, Channel Islands, on 28 January 1943. He attended De La Salle College on Jersey, then the University of Reading, where he graduated with a BA in economics and history. After a few years teaching English in Spain and France, during which time he received qualifications in French from the University of Paris and the Alliance Française, he completed a Postgraduate Certificate in Education at the University of London. He became a teacher at St Joseph's Academy, Blackheath in London, rising to become its head of economics, and also joined the National Association of Schoolmasters Union of Women Teachers (NASUWT), first being elected to its national executive in 1975.

=== NASUWT ===
In 1978, de Gruchy became the full-time Assistant Secretary of the NASUWT, then in 1983 he became Deputy General Secretary, and in 1990 was elected as General Secretary of the union.

As leader of the union, de Gruchy opposed the introduction of the National Curriculum. His opposition was a major reason why the Labour Party, on coming to power, commissioned the Dearing Report into education. De Gruchy also opposed the introduction of literacy and numeracy hours, and rejected a mooted merger between the NASUWT and rival teachers' unions. He retired as General Secretary in April 2002, but maintained connections with the union, writing History of the NASUWT 1919–2002: the story of a battling minority, which was published in 2013.

=== Politics ===
On retirement from the NASUWT, de Gruchy served for a year as President of the Trades Union Congress. In 2007, he was chosen as secretary of the Orpington Labour Party. He fought Orpington as the Labour candidate in both 2015 and 2017, being defeated on both occasions by the Conservative incumbent Jo Johnson. In 2015, at 72 years and 3 months, he claimed that he was the oldest first-time candidate to stand in the election, whereas in fact Ian Sanderson (Liberal Democrat, Romford) was the oldest at 73 years and 8 months.)

=== Death ===
De Gruchy died on 29 November 2025, at the age of 82.

Trade union offices
Preceded by Fred Smithies	Deputy General Secretary of NASUWT; 1983–1990	Succeeded by Eamonn O'Kane
Preceded by Fred Smithies	General Secretary of NASUWT; 1990–2002	Succeeded by Eamonn O'Kane
Preceded by Tony Young	President of the Trades Union Congress; 2003	Succeeded by Roger Lyons
