= Assistant Masters' Association =

British trade union

- Merged into: Assistant Masters' and Mistresses' Association
- Founded: 1891
- Dissolved: 1978
- Headquarters: 29 Gordon Square, London
- Location: United Kingdom
- Members: 40,000 (1978)
- Publication: The Journal of the Assistant Masters' Association
- Affiliations: WCOTP

The Assistant Masters' Association (AMA) was a trade union representing male teachers in British secondary schools.

The union was founded in 1891 as the Incorporated Association of Assistant Masters in Secondary Schools, although it soon became the "Assistant Masters' Association", a counterpart to the Association of Assistant Mistresses (AAM). Philip Edgar Martineau was one of the founders of the association. Membership of the union grew steadily, reaching 3,259 in 1910, and about 40,000 by 1978.

From 1978, single-sex trade unions were prohibited, and the AMA accordingly merged with the AAM, forming the Assistant Masters' and Mistresses' Association.

== General Secretaries ==
1901: C. J. C. Mackness
1902: W. H. D. Rouse
1906: J. G. Lamb
1921: George Dixon Dunkerley
1939: Andrew Hutchings
