= International Federation of Teachers' Associations =

The International Federation of Teachers' Associations (IFTA; French: Fédération internationale des associations d'instituteurs, FIAI) was a global union federation representing teachers in primary schools.

The federation was established in 1905, as the International Bureau of Federations of Teachers, the first federation of teachers. In 1926, at a meeting in Amsterdam, it was reformed as the IFTA. After World War II, it began working closely with the International Federation of Secondary Teachers (FIPESO). In 1952, FIPESO, the IFTA and the World Organisation of the Teaching Profession merged to form the World Confederation of Organizations of the Teaching Profession. The IFTA continued as an autonomous section of the new federation.

In 1993, the federation dissolved into the new Education International.

== Leadership ==
=== General Secretaries ===
1926: Louis Dumas
1938:
1950s: Robert Michel
1970: Jean Daubard
1982:

=== Presidents ===
1926: George Lapierre
Louis Dumas
1951:
1961: Henri Baude
1963—1968: Shalom Levin
Jean-Jacques Maspero
