= Canebrake, West Virginia =

Unincorporated community in West Virginia, United States

Canebrake
- Unincorporated community
- Location within the state of West Virginia Canebrake (the United States)
- Coordinates: 37°14′51″N 81°38′27″W
- Country: United States
- State: West Virginia
- County: McDowell
- Time zone: UTC-5 (Eastern (EST))
  - Summer (DST): UTC-4 (EDT)
- ZIP codes: 24819
- GNIS feature ID: 1536992

Canebrake is an unincorporated community located in McDowell County, West Virginia, United States. Canebrake was named for the wild canes near the original town site. It has also been spelled Canebreak in its past.
