= National Autonomous School Workers' Trade Union =

Trade union of Italy

SNALS
- National Autonomous School Workers' Trade Union
- Sindacato Nazionale Autonomo Lavoratori Scuola
- Founded: 1976
- Headquarters: Rome, Italy
- Location: Italy
- Members: (2005)
- Key people: Marco Paolo Nigi, General Secretary
- Affiliations: Workers Autonomous Trade Unions Confederation (CONFSAL)
- Website: www.snals.it

The National Autonomous School Workers' Trade Union (SNALS or S.N.A.L.S.; Italian Sindacato Nazionale Autonomo Lavoratori Scuola, French Syndicat Autonome des Travailleurs de l'École, German Autonome Nazionale Gewerkschaft Schulbedienstete) is an Italian autonomous school and university workers' trade union.
