= Association of Teachers and Lecturers =

British trade union

- Association of Teachers and Lecturers
- Abbreviation: ATL
- Merged into: National Education Union
- Founded: 1978 (merger of AAM and AMA)
- Dissolved: 1 September 2017
- Headquarters: 7 Northumberland Street, London
- Location: United Kingdom
- Members: 200,631 (2015)
- Key people: Shelagh Hirst, President; Mary Bousted, General Secretary
- Affiliations: EI, TUC, Unions 21
- Website: www.atl.org.uk

The Association of Teachers and Lecturers (ATL) was a trade union, teachers' union and professional association, affiliated to the Trades Union Congress, in the United Kingdom representing educators from nursery and primary education to further education. In March 2017, ATL members endorsed a proposed merger with the National Union of Teachers to form a new union known as the National Education Union, which came into existence on 1 September 2017. At that time, approximately 120,000 individuals belonged to the union (apart from those professions included in the name, education support staff and teaching assistants were also members), making it the third largest teaching and education union in the UK. ATL had members throughout England, Scotland, Wales, Northern Ireland, the Channel Islands, the Isle of Man, and British Service schools overseas.

The ATL brand continues as a section or subsidiary of the National Education Union.

== Governance and administration ==
ATL was led by its Executive Committee who were assisted by a General Secretary. All senior officers and officials were elected by an Association wide ballot and the overall direction was determined by the Annual Conference which had delegates from each branch.

The ATL President served a one-year term.

- From September 2000, ?
- From September 2001, Julie Grant.
- From September 2002,
- From September 2003, Mike Short?
- From September 2004, Eddie Ferguson?
- From September 2005,
- From September 2006, Stuart Herdson.
- From September 2007,
- From September 2008, Andy Ballard.
- From September 2009, Lesley Ward.
- From September 2010, Andy Brown.
- From September 2011, Alice Robinson.
- From September 2012, Hank Roberts.
- From September 2013, Alison Sherratt.
- From September 2014, Mark Baker.
- From September 2015, Kim Knappett.
- From September 2016, Shelagh Hirst.
- From September 2017, Niamh Sweeney.
- From September 2018, Kim Knappett who became Joint President of the National Education Union on 1 January 2019.
- The final ATL General Secretary was Dr Mary Bousted.

== History ==
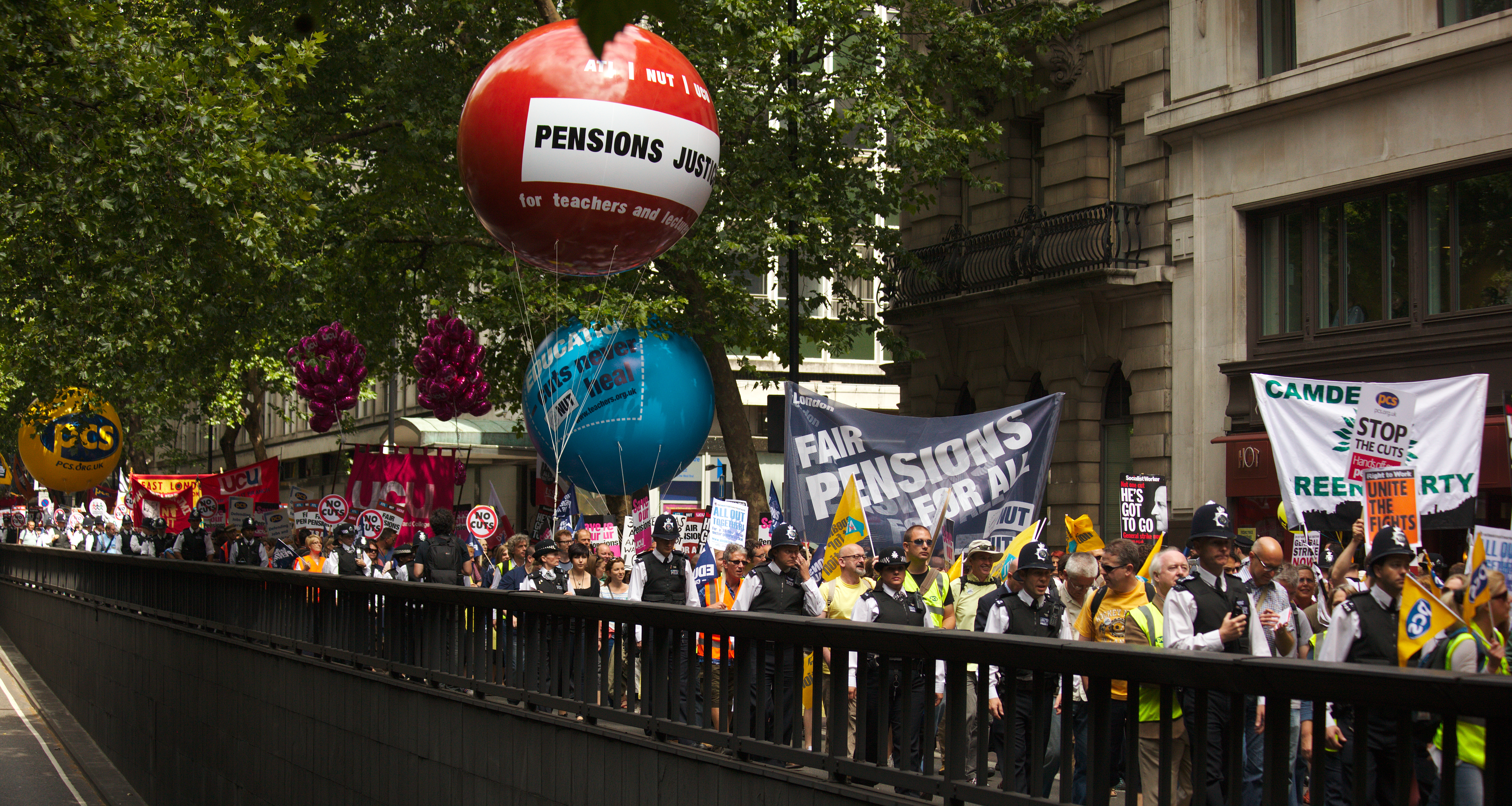
Striking teachers and public sector workers march down the Kingsway, London, flanked by police on 17 June, as part of the 2011 United Kingdom anti-austerity protests.

The origins of ATL go back to 1884 when 180 women met to create the Association of Assistant Mistresses (AAM). These women worked in schools founded for higher education of girls. Their concern was primarily for the pupils. However, in 1921, the AAM appointed representatives to the newly formed Burnham Committee on Salaries in Secondary Schools.

1891 saw the formation of the Association of Assistant Masters in Secondary Schools (AMA). Its purpose was to protect and improve the conditions of service of secondary teachers. Between 1899 and 1908, it played an influential part in obtaining security of tenure for assistant teachers through the Endowed Schools Act.

Then in 1978 AAM and AMA merged to form the Assistant Masters and Mistresses Association (AMMA), with a membership of approximately 75,000. The name was changed in 1993 to the Association of Teachers and Lecturers (ATL).

ATL affiliated to the TUC in 1999. It resigned from the Irish Congress of Trade Unions in 2015. In January 2011, the Association for College Management merged into ATL. The ATL merged with the National Union of Teachers in 2017, forming the National Education Union.

== Annual Conferences from 2009 ==
- 1999 Harrogate
- 2000 Cardiff
- 2001 Belfast
- 2002 Torquay
- 2003 Blackpool
- 2004 Bournemouth
- 2005 Torquay
- 2006 Gateshead
- 2007
- 2008 Torquay
- 2009 Liverpool
- 2010 Manchester
- 2011 Liverpool
- 2012 Manchester
- 2013 Liverpool
- 2014 Manchester
- 2015 Liverpool
- 2016 Liverpool
- 2017
- 2018

== General Secretaries from 1978 ==
- 1978: Andrew Hutchings and Joyce Baird
- 1979: Geoff Beynon and Joyce Baird
- 1988: Peter Smith and Joyce Baird
- 1990: Peter Smith
- 2003: Mary Bousted

== See also ==
- Education in the United Kingdom
