= Union of Women Teachers =

Former trade union of the United Kingdom

The Union of Women Teachers (UWT) was a trade union for female teachers in the United Kingdom.

The National Union of Women Teachers dissolved in 1960, and women teachers thereafter could choose to join either the National Union of Teachers or the Association of Assistant Mistresses. The National Association of Schoolmasters (NAS), while not wanting to admit women as members, was concerned that both the alternative unions were hostile to them. As a result, in 1964, the NAS encouraged the formation of the Union of Women Teachers.

The union was always small, and by 1969 had only 2,000 members, although it grew to 6,000 by 1975. Due to its small size, it worked closely with the NAS, particularly on legal and professional matters. In 1970, the two unions formed an alliance, the "Joint Two". The UWT was refused permission to join the Trades Union Congress in 1974.

The Sex Discrimination Act 1975 made it unlawful to maintain a single-sex union. As a result, the NAS proposed a merger with the UWT. The UWT leadership opposed this, but were outvoted at the union's annual conference. The general secretary, Penny Yaffe, left the platform in protest, along with most of the union's executive committee. They were declared by the union's president to have thereby resigned, and the merger went ahead, forming the National Association of Schoolmasters Union of Women Teachers. However, Yaffe founded the rival Association of Career Teachers.

== General Secretaries ==
1965: Sally Rogers
1967: Beryl Gandy
1969: Geraldine Jones
1970: Penny Yaffe
