= NASUWT =

Teachers' trade union in the United Kingdom

NASUWT – The Teachers' Union
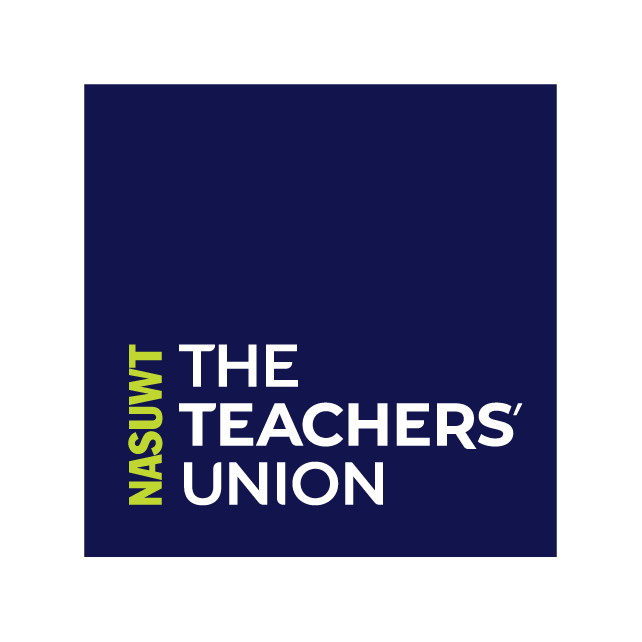
- Founded: 1976; 50 years ago
- Merger of: NAS; UWT
- Headquarters: Rednal, Birmingham
- Location: United Kingdom
- Members: ▼259,079 (2024)
- General Secretary: Matt Wrack
- Affiliations: TUC; ICTU; STUC; EI
- Website: nasuwt.org.uk

NASUWT – The Teachers' Union is a trade union representing teachers in all the Countries of the United Kingdom, across all phases of education, affiliated with the Trades Union Congress, the Scottish Trades Union Congress, the Irish Congress of Trade Unions and Education International. It is one of the largest teaching unions in the UK, representing only qualified teachers rather than a wider group of education staff.

The union describes itself as "the undiluted voice of the teaching profession," emphasising that its work is centred exclusively on teachers’ interests.

The union engages in negotiations with employers, campaigns on pay and workload, provides legal and professional support to members, and, when necessary, takes industrial action.

Membership is open to teachers at every stage of their careers, including those in supply roles, leadership positions, and in both the maintained and independent sectors.

== History ==
The origins of NASUWT can be traced back to the formation of the National Association of Men Teachers (NAMT) in 1919, which formed as a group within the National Union of Teachers (NUT) to promote the interests of male teachers. The formation of the NAMT was in response to an NUT referendum the same year, approving the principle of equal pay for women.

The NAMT continued its campaign to further the interests of male teachers, changing its name in 1920 to the National Association of Schoolmasters (NAS). In 1922 the NAS broke away from the NUT and established its own organisation. The secession came about indirectly following a decision at the NAS Conference that year, to prohibit NAS members from continuing to also be members of the NUT after the 31 December 1922.

The NAS aimed to recruit every schoolmaster into the NAS, to safeguard and promote the interests of male teachers, to ensure recognition of the social and economic responsibilities of male teachers, and to ensure the representation of schoolmasters on matters concerned with education, with both the local education authorities and government. The NAS also maintained that all boys over the age of seven should be taught mainly by men and that schoolmasters should not serve under women heads.

As the secondary education sector expanded, the NAS built its organisation among male secondary teachers, it adopted the methods of collective bargaining and militant industrial action in pursuing a narrow range of pay and conditions issues related to the interests of full-time male 'career teachers'.

By the 1960s, the union was still opposed to admitting women as members, but it was concerned that the unions open to women teachers were all hostile to its objectives. As a result, it encouraged the formation of the Union of Women Teachers (UWT).

In 1976 the NAS merged with the Union of Women Teachers (UWT) and the Scottish Schoolmasters' Association (SSA). The merger was largely a consequence of the Sex Discrimination Act 1975, which made it unlawful to exclude from membership on grounds of gender. It then became the National Association of Schoolmasters/Union of Women Teachers (NAS/UWT). The 'slash' separating the two sections of the union was later dropped and the name usually appeared subtitled 'The Career Teachers Union' – a reference to the lifelong commitment of the 'career' classroom teacher.

Although from many years the union had officially registered its name with the Certification Office for Trade Unions and Employers Associations as the NASUWT, it is only since 2015 that the union has adopted its name in the short form using only the initials NASUWT and subtitled 'The Teachers' Union'. The change reflected that 84 per cent of its members were now women and it was effectively able to remove from its name the now archaic term 'schoolmasters'.

=== Industrial relations, bargaining and strikes ===
The union as the National Association of Schoolmasters (NAS) with 21,000 members attempted to seek representation in national pay negotiations known as the Burnham Committee but was rejected in 1960. The Burnham Committees however were dominated by representatives of the much larger National Union of Teachers (NUT) with a membership of 201,000.

However following a series of strikes and rallies the NAS achieved recognition for national pay bargaining on the Burnham Committees in 1962. Despite a successful campaign, the NUT continued to hold the majority of seats. In 1969 for instance, the NUT had 15 members on the Teachers’ Panel, with the NAS holding the 2 seats it achieved on joining the Committee in 1962. The NUT general secretary also held the joint secretaryship of the main Burnham Committees and the leadership of their Teachers' Panels for most of their existence.

By the mid-1980s, the pay rises for teachers of the previous decade had been considerably eroded by inflation In February, 1985 the NASUWT along with other teaching unions withdrew 'goodwill' in pursuit of higher pay. Members refused to supervise at lunchtimes, attend meetings with parents outside school hours, or cover for absent colleagues. The dispute escalated and a series of strikes followed for a period of the next two years.

By 1987 the divisions over strategy with other unions, notably the NUT, brought the dispute to an end. The result was the 1987 Teachers' Pay and Conditions Act, which abolished the national pay negotiations and replaced them with an Interim Advisory Committee on School Teachers' Pay and Conditions, on which the unions had no representation. This was in turn replaced in 1991 by The School Teachers’ Review Body (STRB), an independent body to examine and report on such matters relating to the statutory conditions of employment of school teachers in England and Wales.

=== Social partnership and work force reform ===
From 2003 to 2010 the NASUWT was involved in "social partnership" – a programme of meetings between union leaders, the Labour government and employers' organisations. The meetings were initially to discuss pay and workforce issues but developed into a forum for broader discussion on policy proposals. The National Union of Teachers chose not to participate in social partnership.

Social partnership was confined to the Labour government, and did not continue after the establishment of the Conservative and Liberal Democrat coalition in 2010. Instead, the union lodged a formal trade dispute with the government over workload, conditions of service, pensions, and jobs. In November 2011, members of the NASUWT voted by a 4-to-1 margin (on a 39% turnout) to take strike action, and begin working to the letter of their contracts. The NASUWT set aside historical differences with the National Union of Teachers; a joint declaration in May 2012 led to a co-ordinated work-to-rule and strike action in autumn 2013.

In 2010, NASUWT lead a campaign leading to the abolition of a code of conduct proposed by the General Teaching Council.

In 2011, it lead a campaign recognising the effects of cyberbullying, and a campaign to bar members of the British National Party from the teaching profession. The union also joined campaigns against the coalition government. It asserted that "the Education Act 2011 heralded the break-up of the entire state education service" and subsequently lobbied under the slogan "Reclaim the promise", harking back to the Education Act 1944. NASUWT encouraged its members to join marches sponsored by the TUC, and participated in the Robin Hood tax campaign.

In 2026, the union started a campaign to lengthen fully paid maternity pay for teachers from 4 weeks, which it had been for over 25 years, to 26 weeks, and to improve paternity pay.

== Location ==
The headquarters is situated by the Lickey Hills Country Park in North Worcestershire which borders the southern edge of the City of Birmingham (NASUWT Rose Hill, Rednal, Birmingham B45 8RS). Built as a businessman's private house in 1897, Hillscourt was a preparatory school before the union bought it in 1971. Its library was named the Terry Casey Library in 1983 to commemorate Casey's 20 years as general secretary. The union also has nine regional centres in England, and national centres each of Northern Ireland, Wales and Scotland.

== Leadership ==
=== General secretaries ===
1975: Terry Casey
1983: Fred Smithies
1990: Nigel de Gruchy
2002: Eamonn O'Kane
2004: Chris Keates
2020: Patrick Roach
2025: Matt Wrack

=== Deputy general secretaries ===
1981: Fred Smithies
1983: Nigel de Gruchy
1990: Eamonn O'Kane
2002: Chris Keates
2004: Jerry Bartlett
2010: Patrick Roach
2020: Gareth Young
2021: Jane Peckham

== See also ==
- National Education Union
