= National Association of Schoolmasters =

- Predecessor: National Association of Men Teachers
- Merged into: National Association of Schoolmasters/Union of Women Teachers
- Founded: October 1922
- Dissolved: 1 January 1976
- Headquarters: 55 Gordon Square, London
- Location: United Kingdom
- Members: 22,651 (1960)
- Publication: New Schoolmaster
- Affiliations: TUC, NFPW, IFFTU

The National Association of Schoolmasters (NAS) was a trade union representing male schoolteachers in the United Kingdom.

== History ==
The origins of the NAS can be traced back to the formation of the National Association of Men Teachers (NAMT) in 1919. The Association was formed as a group within the National Union of Teachers (NUT) to promote the interests of male teachers. The group existed alongside others within the NUT such as the National Federation of Class Teachers, the National Association of Head Teachers and the National Federation of Women Teachers (later to become the National Union of Women Teachers).

The formation of the NAMT was in response to an NUT referendum the same year, approving the principle of equal pay. This major change in salary policy had been achieved whilst many male teachers were away serving in the army during the First World War.

A subsequent three-year campaign by the NAMT to further the interests of male teachers in the NUT saw its name changed in 1920 to the National Association of Schoolmasters (NAS) and finally resulted in secession of the NAS from the NUT in 1922. The secession came about indirectly following a decision at the NAS Conference that year to prohibit NAS members from continuing to also be members of the NUT after 31 December 1922.

In its early years, the NAS focused on opposing women teachers. It campaigned against women teaching boys aged over seven, and also against women headteachers in school where men worked. It aimed to recruit every schoolmaster into the NAS, to safeguard and promote the interests of male teachers, to ensure recognition of the social and economic responsibilities of male teachers, and to ensure the representation of schoolmasters on matters concerned with education with both the local education authorities (LEAs) and government. Although initially only active in England and Wales, it later also accepted members in Northern Ireland. In Scotland, it instead worked with the Scottish Schoolmasters' Association.

As the secondary education sector expanded, the NAS built its organisation among male secondary teachers, it adopted the methods of collective bargaining and militant industrial action in pursuing a narrow range of pay and conditions issues related to the interests of full-time male 'career teachers'. By the 1960s, the union was still opposed to admitting women as members, but it was concerned that the unions open to women teachers were all hostile to its objectives. As a result, it encouraged the formation of the Union of Women Teachers (UWT).

The union secured a place on the Burnham committee to negotiate teachers' salaries in 1961, following a series of strikes and rallies. The also affiliated to the Trades Union Congress and the International Federation of Free Teachers' Unions.

In 1976, the NAS merged with the UWT and the Scottish Schoolmasters' Association, largely as a consequence of the Sex Discrimination Act 1975, which made it unlawful to exclude from membership on grounds of gender. It became the National Association of Schoolmasters/Union of Women Teachers (NAS/UWT).

== General Secretaries ==
1923: A. E. Warren
1941: R. Anderson
1956: Edward Rushworth
1963: Terry Casey
