= National Federation of Professional Workers =

Former British trade union federation

The National Federation of Professional Workers (NFPW) was a trade union federation in the United Kingdom.

== History ==
The federation was founded on the initiative of G. D. H. Cole and Robin Page Arnot as the Federation of Professional, Technical, Administrative and Supervisory Workers. It aimed to encourage professional, clerical and government workers to join trade unions, and for those unions to co-operate where possible. This was principally through co-ordinated lobbying of Parliament, particularly on issues of pension rights and health and safety; and also through the co-ordinated production of relevant statistics. While an earlier National Clerical and Administrative Workers' Joint Committee had filled a similar role, it had collapsed during World War I.

In November 1919, Cole persuaded Alexander Walkden to organise a meeting at the Essex Hall in London, with representatives of all eligible unions invited. This was held on 7 February 1920, and established the federation.

In 1927, the Trades Disputes Act banned civil service unions from membership of any federation containing other organisations. Those unions therefore had to disaffiliate and focus on activity in the Civil Service Alliance and Civil Service Federation. The law was repealed in 1946, and total membership of affiliated unions soon doubled to 500,000.

Most remaining unions which were eligible for membership joined in the 1960s, notably including the National Association of Local Government Officers, the Institution of Professional Civil Servants, the National Association of Schoolmasters and the Association of Teachers in Technical Institutions. By the end of the 1970s, 41 unions were affiliated, representing more than 1,500,000 workers, but the federation was in a very poor financial position. Its members were unwilling to increase their affiliation fees, most believing that the NFPW's services were now better provided by the Trades Union Congress, so the organisation dissolved in 1982.

== General Secretaries ==
1920: William C. Keay
1929: Stephen W. Smith
1950: P. H. M. Hoey
1962: John Fryd

== Presidents ==
1920: E. H. Walker
1921: George Lathan
1937: George Walker Thomson
1948: Anne Godwin
1956: Jim Bradley
1960: Jim Mortimer
1962: Laurence Welsh
1964: Arthur Palmer
1966: John Dryden
1969: Eric Winterbottom
1971: Terry Casey
1973: Geoffrey Drain
1975: David Perryman

== Treasurers ==
1947: Percy Heady
1949: James Haworth
1956: Ray Gunter
1960: Lord Lindgren
1963: Tom G. Bradley
1967: Walter Johnson
1979: Jim Mills
