= World Confederation of Organizations of the Teaching Profession =

Former global union federation (1952–1993)

WCOTP
- World Confederation of Organisations of the Teaching Profession
- Successor: Education International (EI)
- Founded: 1952
- Dissolved: 1992

The World Confederation of Organisations of the Teaching Profession (WCOTP) was a global union federation bringing together trade unions representing teachers.

== History ==
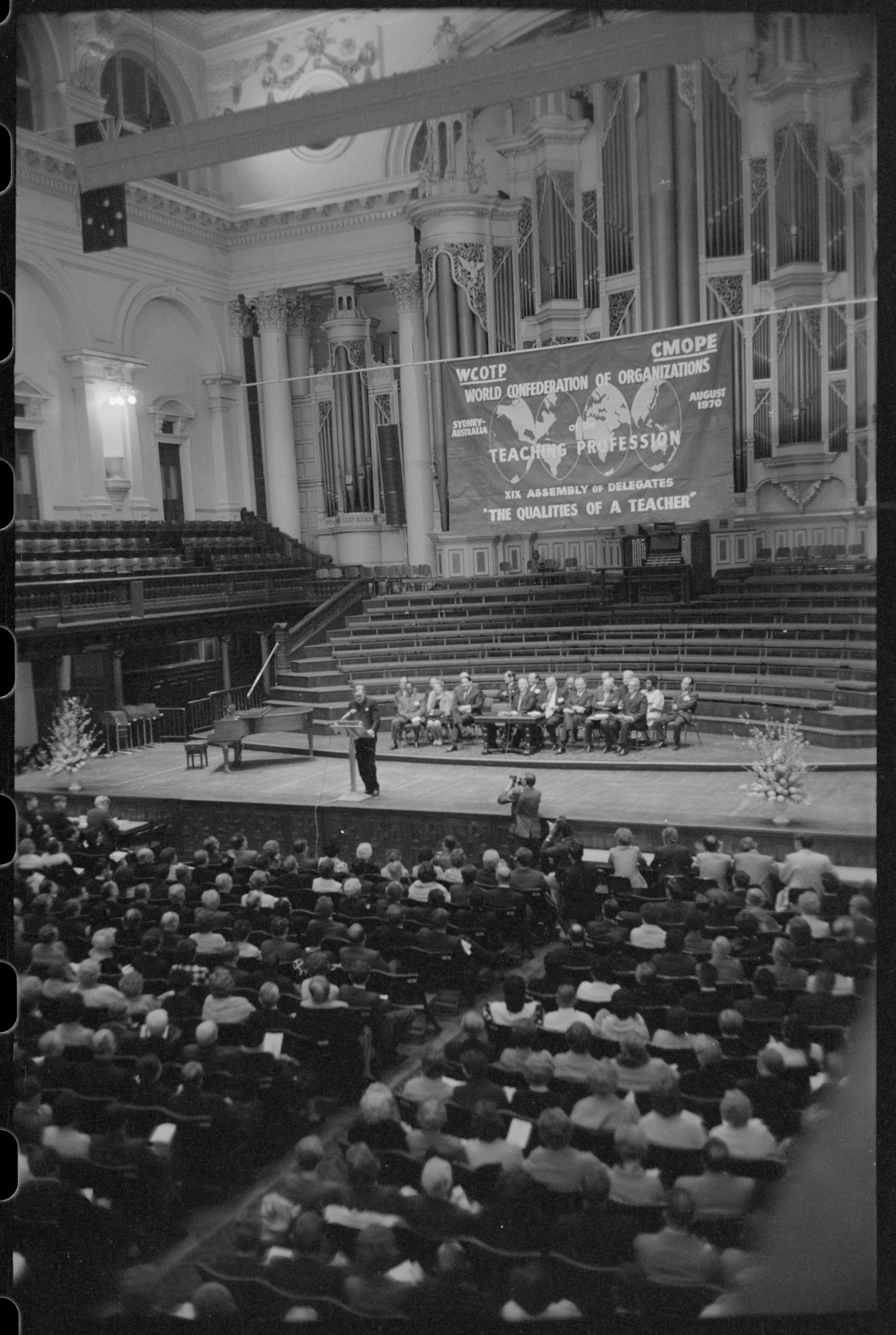
19th Assembly of Delegates of the World Confederation of Organizations of the Teaching Profession, Sydney Town Hall, August 1970

The federation was established in 1952, with the merger of the International Federation of Secondary Teachers (FIPESO), the International Federation of Teachers' Associations (IFTA), and the World Organisation of the Teaching Profession (WOTP), the three main international federations of teachers. FIPESO and the IFTA became sections of the new organisation, while the WOTP was dissolved into it.

The federation aimed to promote the consolidation of teachers' unions, to have one in each country, to support its members, and to exchange professional knowledge. For many years, it had around 140 members, plus sixty associate members and five specialist international members. These international members were the International Association for School Librarianship, the International Council on Education for Teaching, the International Council on Health, Physical Education and Recreation, and the International Reading Association.

At the end of 1992, the federation merged with the International Federation of Free Teachers' Unions, to form Education International.

== Affiliates ==
In 1979, the following unions were affiliated to the federation:

| Union | Country | Affiliated membership |
|---|---|---|
| Australian Teachers' Federation | Australia | 104,404 |
| Verband der Professoren Oesterreichs | Austria | 1,500 |
| Bangladesh College Teachers' Association | Bangladesh | 10,320 |
| Barbados Secondary Teachers' Union | Barbados | 230 |
| Barbados Union of Teachers | Barbados | 1,200 |
| Fédération de l'enseignement moyen officiel du degré superieur de Belgique | Belgium | 1,000 |
| Fédération générale du personnel enseignant | Belgium | 3,362 |
| Belize National Teachers Union | Belize | 500 |
| Amalgamated Bermuda Union of Teachers | Bermuda | 650 |
| Botswana Teachers' Union | Botswana | 265 |
| Associacao Brasileira de Educacao | Brazil | 1,000 |
| Confederacao dos Professores do Brasil | Brazil | 20,150 |
| British Virgin Islands Teachers' Association | British Virgin Islands | 100 |
| Brunei Malay Teachers' Association | Brunei | 1,344 |
| Canadian Teachers' Federation | Canada | 212,874 |
| China Education Society | Taiwan | 500 |
| Asociacion Nacional de Educadores | Costa Rica | 18,000 |
| Danmarks Laererforening | Denmark | 46,492 |
| Gymanasieskolernes Laererforening | Denmark | 3,400 |
| Solidaridad de Maestras Salvadorenas | El Salvador | 1,000 |
| Fiji Teachers' Union | Fiji | 1,600 |
| Fijian Teachers' Association | Fiji | 1,800 |
| Lastentarhanopettajaliitto | Finland | 1,779 |
| Opettajien Ammattijarjesto | Finland | 35,866 |
| Svenska Finlands Lärarförbund | Finland | 1,700 |
| Syndicat national de l'enseignement technique | France | 11,000 |
| Syndicat national des enseignements de second degre | France | 45,500 |
| Syndicat national des personnels de direction des éstablishments de l'enseignement secondaire | France | 2,926 |
| Syndicat national des Professeurs des Ecoles normales | France | 1,500 |
| Gambia Teachers' Union | Gambia | 400 |
| Deutscher Lehrerverband | West Germany | 120,500 |
| Ghana National Association of Teachers | Ghana | 22,000 |
| Assistant Masters' Association | United Kingdom | 40,000 |
| Association of Assistant Mistresses | United Kingdom | 33,300 |
| Association of Head Mistresses | United Kingdom | 765 |
| Head Masters' Association | United Kingdom | 1,855 |
| National Association of Teachers in Further and Higher Education | United Kingdom | 40,000 |
| National Union of Teachers | United Kingdom | 196,164 |
| Educational Institute of Scotland | United Kingdom | 45,527 |
| Ulster Teachers' Union | United Kingdom | 3,664 |
| Federation of Primary Teachers of Greece | Greece | 15,000 |
| Guyana Association of Masters and Mistresses | Guyana | 128 |
| Guyana Teachers' Association | Guyana | 2,472 |
| Colegio Profesional 'Superacion Magisterial' Hondureno | Honduras | 3,133 |
| Hong Kong Teachers' Association | Hong Kong | 1,041 |
| Felag menntaskolakennara | Iceland | 140 |
| Samband Islenzkra Barnakennara | Iceland | 1,086 |
| All-India Federation of Educational Associations | India | 450,000 |
| Persatuan Guru Republik Indonesia | Indonesia | 256,800 |
| Iran Teachers' Association | Iran | 6,000 |
| Association of Secondary Teachers | Ireland | 3,000 |
| Irish National Teachers' Organisation | Ireland | 18,670 |
| Association of Secondary School Teachers | Israel | 6,000 |
| Israel Teachers' Union | Israel | 25,040 |
| Federazione Nazionale Insegnanti Scoule Medie | Italy | 1,000 |
| Sindicato Nazionale scuola media | Italy | 8,000 |
| Syndicat national de l'enseignement primaire public de Cóte de'Ivoire | Côte d'Ivoire | Unknown |
| Jamaica Teachers' Association | Jamaica | 14,000 |
| Japan Education Association | Japan | 35,000 |
| Japan Teachers' Union | Japan | 381,000 |
| Kenya National Union of Teachers | Kenya | 38,200 |
| Korean Federation of Teachers' Associations | South Korea | 60,000 |
| Syndicat des enseignants des écoles privées | Lebanon | 7,000 |
| National Teachers' Association of Liberia | Liberia | 2,500 |
| Association des instituteurs réunis | Luxembourg | 1,800 |
| Association des professeurs de l'enseignement secondaire et supérieur | Luxembourg | 600 |
| General Federation of Teachers of Luxembourg | Luxembourg | 460 |
| Fédération des Syndicats des Fonctionnaires des Affaires Culturelles | Madagascar | 1,850 |
| National Union of the Teaching Profession | Malaysia | 8,000 |
| Sabah Teachers' Union | Malaysia | 1,000 |
| Sarawak Teachers' Union | Malaysia | 1,200 |
| Syndicat National de l'Education et de la Culture | Mali | 3,000 |
| Malta Union of Teachers | Malta | 2,500 |
| Secondary School Teachers' Association | Malta | 310 |
| Dutch Association of Teachers | Netherlands | 14,674 |
| New Zealand Educational Institute | New Zealand | 17,558 |
| Post Primary Teachers' Association | New Zealand | 9,300 |
| Nigeria Union of Teachers | Nigeria | 150,000 |
| Norsk Laererlag | Norway | 34,200 |
| Norsk Lektorlag | Norway | 7,125 |
| Magisterio Panameno Unido | Panama | 1,620 |
| Papua New Guinea Teachers' Association | Papua New Guinea | 9,800 |
| Federacion de Educadores del Paraguay | Paraguay | 1,704 |
| Philippine Public School Teachers' Association | Philippines | 147,000 |
| Rhodesia African Teachers' Association | Rhodesia | 1,898 |
| Rhodesia Teachers' Association | Rhodesia | 2,329 |
| Sierra Leone Teachers' Union | Sierra Leone | 4,850 |
| Singapore Chinese Middle School Teachers' Union | Singapore | 500 |
| Singapore Chinese School Teachers' Union | Singapore | 1,200 |
| Singapore Malay Teachers' Union | Singapore | 782 |
| Singapore Tamil Teachers' Union | Singapore | 150 |
| Singapore Teachers' Union | Singapore | 7,000 |
| African Teachers' Association of South Africa | South Africa | 20,000 |
| Federacion de Trabajadores de la Ensenanza del Estado Espanol | Spain | Unknown |
| All-Ceylon Union of Teachers | Sri Lanka | 1,200 |
| Swaziland National Association of Teachers | Swaziland | 800 |
| Lärarhögskolornas och Seminariernas Amneslärarförening | Sweden | 700 |
| Lärar Riksförbund | Sweden | 17,773 |
| Svenska Facklärarförbundet | Sweden | 37,042 |
| Swedish Teachers' Union | Sweden | 57,159 |
| Skolledarförbundet | Sweden | 1,715 |
| Tekniska Linjers Lärarförbund | Sweden | 500 |
| Schweizerischer Lehrerverein | Switzerland | 19,000 |
| Société pédagogique de la Suisse romande | Switzerland | 6,100 |
| Société suisse des professeurs de l'enseignement secondaire | Switzerland | 3,560 |
| Education Society | Thailand | 510 |
| Syndicat des enseignants laiques du Togo | Togo | 1,500 |
| Tonga Teachers' Association | Tonga | 222 |
| Trinidad and Tobago Teachers' Union | Trinidad and Tobago | 6,000 |
| Syndicat national de l'enseignement primarie en Tunisie | Tunisia | 3,000 |
| Uganda Teachers' Association | Uganda | 4,000 |
| National Education Association | United States | 1,400,000 |
| Organisation libre des enseignants africains de Haute-Volta | Upper Volta | 185 |
| Asociacion de Profesores de Ensenanza Secundaria | Uruguay | 1,200 |
| Union de Funcionarios Docentes y Administrativos de la Universidad del Trabajo | Uruguay | 1,200 |
| Caribbean Union of Teachers | West Indies | 25,000 |
| Zambia National Union of Teachers | Zambia | 13,000 |

== Leadership ==
=== General Secretaries ===
1952: William George Carr
1970: John M. Thompson
1980: Norman Goble
1989: Robert Harris

=== Presidents ===
1952: Ronald Gould
1970: William George Carr
1975: Wilhelm Ebert
1978: Motofumi Makieda
1981: Jim Killeen
1986: Joseph Itotoh
