= World Federation of Education Associations =

The World Federation of Education Associations (WFEA) was a global union federation bringing together trade unions representing teachers.

The federation was established in 1923, on the initiative of the National Education Association. Its founding conference was in San Francisco and attracted about 600 representatives from 60 countries.

American school superintendent Augustus O. Thomas served as president from 1925 to 1935.

In 1946, the federation renamed itself as the World Organisation of the Teaching Profession. In 1951, it merged with the International Federation of Secondary Teachers and the International Federation of Teachers' Associations, to form the World Confederation of Organisations of the Teaching Profession.
