= Newark Teachers Association =

NTA
- Newark Teachers Association
- Founded: 1969
- Headquarters: 32980 Alvarado-Niles Rd. Suite 812, Union City, CA 94587
- Location: United States
- Members: Approximately 400
- Key people: Timothy Merritt, President
- Affiliations: CTA; NEA
- Website: www.newarkta.org

The Newark Teachers Association (NTA), headquartered in Union City, California, is the trade union representing teachers and other certificated employees of the Newark Unified School District in Newark, California. The Association represents approximately 400 members. NTA is affiliated with the California Teachers Association (CTA) and the National Education Association (NEA). NTA was formed in 1969 when the teachers of Newark voted to leave the American Federation of Teachers (AFT) and become a CTA affiliate.

== Governance ==
The Newark Teachers Association is directly governed by two bodies, an executive board and a representative council.

=== Executive Board ===
The executive board is the chief governing body of the Association. The Board is responsible for the oversight and general functionality of the Association. It oversees and acts upon confidential matters, including the handling of a filed grievance. It also votes on whether or not to bring issues or other items to the Representative Council.

The Board is composed of a President, a Vice President, a Secretary, a Treasurer, a high school director, a junior high school director, two elementary school directors, an alternative education/special education director, a State Council representative, and a CTA field representative.

Members of the executive board, with the exception of the State Council representative and the CTA field representative, are elected annually through a series of voting meetings at individual school sites, or at an annual general meeting of the Association. The State Council representative is elected by the union to a three-year term while the CTA field representative is appointed by the California Teachers Association.

The 2019–2020 NTA Executive Board has the following members:

- Timothy Merritt, President
- Megan McMillin, Vice President
- Babette Babich, Secretary
- Sean Abruzzi, Treasurer
- Juleus Chapman, Secondary Director
- Nate Whitaker, Secondary Director
- Cheri Villa, Elementary Director
- Gretchen Cava, Elementary Director
- Anne Vanden Broek, At Large & Special Education Director
- David Hernandez, Executive Director
- Bryan Blattel, CAT State Council Representative
- Becky Flanigan, CTA Field Representative

=== Representative Council ===
The Representative Council consists of individual site representatives from each school. The number of representatives a site has on the council is proportional to the number of represented union members at that site. According to the agreement between the Newark Unified School District and the Association, each site is entitled to one site representative for every 15 union members represented. If a school has less than 15 members, one site representative may be elected from that school.

Collectively, the Council decides on non-confidential items that generally impact the entire Association. Such items typically include raising union dues, approving leaflets or flyers to be distributed to unit members, recommending changes in insurance, recommending approval or disapproval of contract agreements, and other items that require a vote of the entire membership of the Association.

This two-body governing system is similar to the bicameral legislature used by the United States Congress.

== Representation problems ==
From August 1969 to March 2012 the Newark Teachers Association was one of the only teacher associations in the nation where individual department chairpersons were not represented by the Association. The Association had tried to organize several times to incorporate department chairpersons into the Association, but all measures had failed since the incorporation of NTA into CTA.

This issue arose early in NTA's history. NTA was originally affiliated with the American Federation of Teachers (AFT) but decided to ultimately join CTA. As a result, department chairpersons elected to remain with AFT and leave the Association via a grandfather clause for the main point that they were exempt from paying NTA/CTA/NEA dues. Since then, AFT ultimately removed itself from all Newark teachers and the department chairs have gone unrepresented since, until an accord was reached in February 2012. NTA also attributes part of this problem to the fact that the American Federation of Teachers is AFL–CIO-affiliated, unlike the independent National Education Association.

In February 2012, the Association and District reached an agreement to allow department chairs to join the Association through "phase-in" clause. The agreement allows department chairs, athletic, and activity directors to join NTA or stay as management employees, but ensures all future hiring decisions for these positions will be automatically incorporated into NTA. The agreement is effective March 1, 2012.

== Recent negotiations history ==
=== 2005 contract negotiations ===
The issue of teachers' salaries was reopened by the Association in 2005, while the District decided to reopen class size. Teachers had initially asked for a 4.23 percent raise, equal to the state-allocated cost-of-living wage adjustment.

Negotiations reached an impasse in late August 2005, as the school district was not prepared to give teachers the raise they were asking for without the Association agreeing to raise class sizes. The previous agreement from 2004 had stated that total student contacts would not exceed 150 per day, which the District wanted to increase. The Association, which refused to agree to this at the time, had begun organizing and mobilizing for a potential strike as talks entered mediation. Shortly thereafter, the District claimed it had reworked its budget and was prepared to return to the bargaining table.

A tentative agreement on a multi-year contract good through 2007 was reached in late November between the parties, thus averting a strike. The Association agreed to accept an increase in the daily student contact limit from 150 to 155 in exchange for a maximum class size cap of 34 per individual class. Also, the District agreed to raise teacher salaries an average of 4.92 percent. The range in increases was from 0.35 percent to 10.13 percent because the parties had also agreed to restructure the system by which teachers are paid. 96 percent of the Association's membership approved the agreement.

=== 2007 contract negotiations ===
In March 2007, the Newark Teachers Association and the Newark Unified School District began negotiations for a successor agreement to the expired 2005–2007 collective bargaining agreement. This marked the first time in three years that the entire contract, cover-to-cover, was reopened.

After several meetings between the parties, a tentative agreement was reached without impasse on September 13, 2007, which included a state allocated cost-of-living wage adjustment during each year of the agreement. Many articles of the agreement were also rewritten and reorganized. The agreement was ratified in October 2007 by a 97 percent approval vote of the NTA membership. The Newark Unified School District ratified the agreement on October 31, 2007, at a special meeting of the Board of Education.

The agreement, effective through 2010, marks one of the first times in a decade that an agreement was reached without any impasse or deadlock between the parties.

== List of presidents ==
- 2002–2009 Phyllis Grenier
- 2009–2011 Chris Baugh
- 2011–2012 Chris Baugh, Bryan Blattel, and Jacob Goldsmith
