= Japan Teachers' Union =

Trade union in Japan

- 日本教職員組合
- Founded: 1947
- Headquarters: Tokyo, Japan
- Location: Japan
- Members: 200,000 (2023)
- Key people: Ryosuke Kato, president; Yasunaga Okamoto, general secretary
- Affiliations: Rengo
- Website: Official website

Japan Teachers' Union (日本教職員組合, Nihon Kyōshokuin Kumiai; JTU), abbreviated Nikkyōso (日教組, Nikkyōso), is Japan's oldest labor union of teachers and school staff. Established in 1947, it was the largest teachers union until a split in the late 1980s. The union is known for its critical stance against the ruling conservative Liberal Democratic Party (LDP) on such issues as Kimigayo (the national anthem), the Flag of Japan, and the screening of history textbooks during the LDP's near continuous one-party rule since 1955. Today Nikkyōso is affiliated to the trade union confederation Rengo. It had approximately 200,000 members as of December 2023.

== History ==
Nikkyōso was founded in June 1947, with assistance from the Japan Communist Party (JCP), as a national federation of local prefectural teachers unions, although in practice each of these unions had considerable autonomy and its own strengths and political orientation. At the time of its founding, Nikkyōso represented almost every single school teacher, university professor, and school staff member in Japan. Initially under the influence of the JCP, in 1950 Nikkyōso joined the nationwide Sōhyō labor confederation and thereafter became more closely affiliated with the Japan Socialist Party (JSP).

From the earliest days of its foundation, Nikkyōso took an extremely militant line against a series of conservative governments in Japan, leading to considerable antagonism between the union and the Ministry of Education. Major points of contention included government requirements that teachers sing the national anthem and salute the Japanese flag in class, training requirements for new teachers, government efforts to recentralize education, efforts to protect school autonomy, government curriculum mandates, and textbook censorship.

From the perspective of the conservative government and right-wing groups in Japan, Nikkyōso was viewed as akin to public enemy number one, as it was seen to be indoctrinating Japan's youth and college students into left-wing, pro-union, and even communistic modes of thought. The decade of the 1950s saw successive conservative governments attempt to break the power of Nikkyōso by introducing a "teacher efficiency ratings system," which the government could then use as an excuse to fire the most militant teachers, and which Nikkyōso fought tooth and nail to prevent. In 1961, police even uncovered a plot by right-wing groups to assassinate the leaders of Nikkyōso.

In the latter half of the 1950s, however, Prime Minister Nobusuke Kishi made smashing Nikkyōso one of his personal missions. In 1958, Kishi finally succeeded in installing the long-delayed teacher efficiency ratings system, allowing the Ministry of Education to fire teachers almost at will. In the aftermath of this epoch-making defeat, Nikkyōso went into decline and began gradually losing members.

In the late 1980s, long-running internal disagreements within Nikkyōso on political orientation and on Nikkyōso's relationships to other national labor organizations finally produced major internal schisms. The union thus became less effective than in previous years at a time when the national government and the Ministry of Education were moving aggressively ahead with a major educational reform. Nikkyōso had staunchly opposed many of the proposed reforms by the Ministry, but it failed to forestall changes in certification and teacher training that it had viewed as an existential threat to its own survival. The new Nikkyōso leadership that emerged after several years of internal discord seemed to take a more conciliatory approach to the Ministry and reform issues, but Nikkyōso membership continued to decline thereafter.

== Presidents ==
1947: Araki Shozaburo
1950: Oka Saburo
1952: Takeshi Kobayashi
1962: Miyanohara Sadamitsu
1971: Motofumi Makieda
1983: Shoju Ohba
1990s:
2004: Yasuo Morikoshi
2008: Yuzuru Nakamura
2012: Ryosuke Kato

== See also ==
- Education in Japan
- Ministry of Education, Culture, Sports, Science and Technology
- Japanese history textbook controversies
- Japanese Society for History Textbook Reform
- Ienaga Saburo
- Kimi Ga Yo
- Flag of Japan
- National Union of General Workers
- Azuma Koshiishi
