= National Foundation for Educational Research =

UK charitable organization

NFER
- Formation: 1946
- Type: Educational research
- Headquarters: Slough, Berkshire, England
- Region served: England; Wales
- Chief Executive: Carole Willis
- Website: www.nfer.ac.uk

The National Foundation for Educational Research (NFER) is an educational research charity which creates a range of insights on educational policy and practice that aim to strengthen practice in the classroom and inform and influence policymakers and other key decision makers.

NFER's expertise covers a wide range of education topics, issues and research methods, including:

- Accountability
- Assessment Classroom Practice
- Education to Employment
- Social Mobility
- School Funding
- School Workforce
- Systems and Structures
- COVID-19 Recovery

NFER's research experts are divided up into six teams:

- Centre for Assessment
- Centre for Policy and Practice: Programmes
- Centre for Policy and Practice: Development
- Centre for Research Planning and Knowledge Management
- Centre for International Education
- Centre for Statistics

NFER also have teams who conduct a wide range of data management activities, design and develop a range of evidence-based products and services for schools and conduct a significant number of education related randomised controlled trials, surveys and evaluations. These activities are undertaken for government departments and agencies, and other non-profit organisations around the world. The Foundation also undertakes a range of internally funded projects exploring the key issues in education.

NFER's clients include government departments and agencies at international, national and local levels, third sector organisations, private and public companies, employers and other organisations with an interest in education. The independent, not-for-profit organisation invests any surplus funds directly back into its programme of research to address key questions in education.

Originally founded in 1946 as the Centre for Educational Research and Development in England and Wales, NFER's head office is located in Slough, with a separate regional office located in York.
