= European Trade Union Committee for Education =

European Trade Union Committee

The European Trade Union Committee for Education (ETUCE) is a European trade union federation based in Brussels. It represents 132 education sector unions in 51 countries, with a total membership of approximately 11 million members. The ETUCE is the European regional structure of Education International. The trade union committee is a member of the European Trade Union Confederation.

== Overview ==
- A Powerful Voice:

The European Trade Union Committee for Education (ETUCE) represents millions of educators across Europe. Its democratic structure, with national unions and an elected committee, ensures strong advocacy for their needs.

- Advocacy & Action:

ETUCE fights for quality education, advocating for policies that benefit both educators and students. They engage with the EU and participate in social dialogue to shape education policy and improve working conditions.

- Campaigns & Knowledge:

Campaigns push for increased funding, teacher development, and inclusive education. Research and resources empower member organizations.

- Addressing Challenges:

ETUCE aligns with UN SDGs, promoting quality education and decent work. They address teacher well-being, digitalization's impact, and the post-pandemic recovery.

- A Force for the Future:

ETUCE champions academic freedom, environmental education, and a strong education system for all Europeans.

== See also ==
- Education International
- European Trade Union Confederation
