= Association of Assistant Mistresses =

Former British trade union

- Merged into: Assistant Masters' and Mistresses' Association
- Founded: 1884
- Dissolved: 1978
- Headquarters: 29 Gordon Square, London
- Location: United Kingdom
- Members: 39,000 (1978)
- Affiliations: WCOTP

The Association of Assistant Mistresses (AAM) was a trade union representing female teachers in British secondary schools.

The union was founded in 1884 as the Association of Assistant Mistresses in Secondary Schools Incorporated, the last part of the name later being dropped. Membership of the union grew steadily, reaching 1,000 in 1910, and 39,000 in 1978. That year, single sex unions were banned, and the AAM accordingly merged with the Assistant Masters' Association, forming the Assistant Masters' and Mistresses' Association.

== General Secretaries ==
When it was founded the first honorary secretary of the association was Florence Gadesden who was later a leading headmistress.

M. Quarrier Hogg
1921: U. Gordon Wilson
c.1943: Olive M. Hastings
1960: Sheila Wood
