= Burnham committee =

The Burnham committee – properly the Burnham Primary and Secondary and Burnham Further Education Committees – was responsible for setting teachers' pay in the United Kingdom.

The committees were established by H. A. L. Fisher in 1919 when he was President of the Board of Education. On each committee there was a Teachers' Panel on which places were allocated to the various teachers unions in proportion to their membership, and an Employers' Panel. The committees were abolished by the Teachers' Pay and Conditions Act 1987. The Teachers Panel for Primary and Secondary Education was dominated by the National Union of Teachers. The National Association of Schoolmasters was not represented until 1961.

Equal pay was a recurring question for the Committee, being a key aim of the National Union of Women Teachers (NUWT) which predated the Burnham Committee. By the 1950s the NUWT was part of the Equal Pay Campaign Committee (EPCC) whose campaign focused on public sector workers, including civil servants, teachers and nurses. Irene Ward MP, who sat on the Burnham Committee in 1944 and 1948, repeatedly asked in Parliament when the Burnham Committee would commit to equal pay. The principal of equal pay in the public sector was agreed in 1955, albeit to be introduced in stages.

The archives of official papers of the Burnham Committees and their Teachers' Panels are held at Warwick University library. The papers of Brian Rusbridge, who was Secretary to the Burnham and Allied Committees, are held in the Institute of Education Archives at University College London.

The committees came to be known informally as "Burnham Committees" after their first chairman, Harry Levy-Lawson, 1st Viscount Burnham, and were officially renamed as such after his death in 1933.
