= International Federation of Free Teachers' Unions =

The International Federation of Free Teachers' Unions (IFFTU) was a global union federation of trade unions representing teachers.

== History ==
The International Federation of Teachers' Trade Unions was founded after World War II, and affiliated to the World Federation of Trade Unions (WFTU). When the large majority of Western trade unions left the WFTU, the teachers' trade secretariat was the only one to remain affiliated to the WFTU. To fill this gap, the new International Confederation of Free Trade Unions (ICFTU) held a meeting in Paris in 1951 to found a rival international secretariat, the "International Federation of Free Teachers' Unions".

By 1960, the secretariat had 12 affiliates in 11 countries, with a total of 229,500 members, and continued to grow rapidly. At the end of 1992, it merged with the World Confederation of Organisations of the Teaching Profession, to form Education International.

== Affiliates ==
In 1960, the following unions were affiliated to the federation:

Union	Country	Affiliated membership
American Federation of Teachers	United States	55,000
Federation of Civil Servants	Belgium	19,000
International Centre of Free Trade Unionists in Exile	N/A	Unknown
National Federation of Education	France	5,000
National Federation of Teachers	Tunisia	2,500
National Union of Elementary Schools	Italy	119,000
National Union of Teachers	Israel	14,500
Spanish Federation of Teachers	Spain	1,000
Trinidad and Tobago Teachers' Union	British West Indies Federation	4,000
Union of Public Services Personnel	Switzerland	850

== Leadership ==
=== General Secretaries ===
1951: Maurice van de Moortel
1965: Andre Braconier
1981: Fred van Leeuwen

=== Presidents ===
1951: Irvin Kuenzli
1956: Pierre Reymond-Sauvin
1965: Heinrich Roden
1972: Erich Frister
1981: Albert Shanker
