= Education International =

Global federation of teachers unions

EI
- Education International
- Founded: 1993; 33 years ago
- Headquarters: Brussels, Belgium
- Location: International
- Members: 32 million in 178 countries and territories (2023)
- Key people: Mugwena Maluleke (President); David Edwards (General Secretary).
- Website: www.ei-ie.org

Education International (EI) is a global union federation (GUF) of teachers' trade unions consisting of 383 member organizations in 178 countries and territories that represents over 32 million education teachers and education support personnel from pre-school through university. It is one of the world's largest sectoral global union federations.

== Campaigns ==
- Go Public! Fund Education. Launched on January 24, 2023, the International Day of Education, this global campaign aims to fund public education and the teaching profession. The campaign is directed by Rebeca Logan, Director of Communications and Campaigns of Education International. It supports Education International´s member organisations in their fight against budget cuts, austerity, and privatisation in and of education, and as they mobilise to build inclusive, quality public education for all.

Timeline of the campaign:

2023: Building on the outcomes of the Transforming Education Summit in September 2022, the United Nations Secretary-General announced in the 19 of June, 2023, the establishment of a High-level Panel on the Teaching Profession. Susan Hopgood, Education International's president at the time, was part of this panel.

2024: The High-Level Panel on the Teaching Profession puts forward recommendations to allow teachers to become drivers of change in education. The recommendations are intended to create an enabling environment that allows teachers to become drivers of change in education, who can help learners critically navigate knowledge and gain the skills and competencies needed in today’s world. Teachers should not be simple conveyers of information but active and collaborative partners for learners, the Panel noted. Adequate financing of education systems and effective integration of technology for learning were cross-cutting themes in the development of the recommendations.

Angelo Gavrielatos, manager of the Go Public! Fund Education campaign, has highlighted the importance of the recommendations as a roadmap for the union struggle. Education International's defends the High-Level Panel’s recommendations as the foundation for achieving quality public education for all and its calling to organise and mobilise for their implementation in all countries.

== History ==
Prior to the 1950s, teacher and other education unions played little role in international trade union federations. In 1912, the International Committee of National Federations of Teachers in Public Secondary Schools was established in Belgium. Internationally, it was known as FIPESO, an acronym derived from its French name: The Federation Internationale des Professeurs de l'Enseignement Secondaire Officiel.

In 1923, the National Education Association (NEA) founded the World Federation of Education Associations (WFEA) in San Francisco. Then in 1926, the International Federation of Teachers' Associations (IFTA) was formed. The same year, the International Trade Secretariat of Teachers (ITST), a grouping of teachers' unions affiliated with the International Federation of Trade Unions (IFTU), was established. But few of these organizations obtained membership of any size, joined the International Labour Organization (ILO), or proved influential. Many were international in name only, with membership usually coming from a few European nations. Except for the WFEA (which was dominated by the NEA), most ceased to function during World War II.

A significant reorganization of the international trade union movement occurred in the wake of the second world war. The World Federation of Trade Unions (WFTU) was founded in October 1945 to bring together trade unions across the world in a single international organization. But a number of conservative Western labor federations, notably the American Federation of Labor (AFL), felt that trade unions from Communist countries were government-dominated. Their inclusion, it was feared, would lead to domination of the WFTU by the Soviet Union. In 1949, the AFL and other trade unions formed the International Confederation of Free Trade Unions (ICFTU), an international organization which rejected communist or communist-led trade unions.

International education trade centers also underwent a reorganization. The WFEA broadened its membership and was renamed the World Organization of the Teaching Profession (WOTP) in 1946. The same year, the ITST affiliated with the WFTU. But the split over communism in the WFTU affected the international education secretariats as well. In 1948, several socialist and communist teachers' unions formed the World Federation of Teachers Unions (known as FISE from its French title, Fédération Internationale Syndicale de l'Enseignement) in Budapest. Most non-communist national teachers' unions refused to join FISE.

IFTA, FIPESO, and FISE formed a liaison group, the Joint Committee of International Teachers' Federations, the same year. But the American-dominated WOTP refused to join. In 1951, following the split in the WFTU and the creation of the anti-communist ICFTU, two new international education secretariats were created. WOTP, FIPESO and the IFTA formed the World Confederation of Organizations of the Teaching Profession (WCOTP). The AFL (primary backer of the ICFTU) and its teacher union (the American Federation of Teachers) pushed the ICFTU to form its own international secretariat to compete with the much more liberal WCOTP. The conservative and determinedly anti-communist International Federation of Free Teachers' Unions (IFFTU) was created the same year as the WCOTP. FISE, meanwhile, affiliated with the WFTU.

The IFFTU remained the much smaller organization until the mid-1970s. Although both the WCOTP and IFFTU gained members through the next 25 years, by 1976 the IFFTU represented unions with only 2.3 million members while the WCOTP represented unions with more than 20 million members. The WCOTP worked closely with the United Nations, UNESCO and the ILO to study the problems of teachers throughout the world, and focused much of its attention on Africa and Asia. For the first 15 years of its existence, the WCOTP worked heavily on a draft UNESCO instrument which would create a consensus on the status, salaries, and protections teachers should have. The final document, "Recommendation Concerning the Status of Teachers," was adopted by UNESCO on October 5, 1966.

The IFFTU and WCOTP remained strong rivals, each organization's policies and actions often reflecting the rivalry between the NEA and AFT (which were their respective secretariat's largest members). But the surge in growth in AFT membership in the 1960s and 1970s significantly improved the membership figures of the IFFTU. A turn away from radical political views by a number of European, African and Asian education unions led a number of national organizations to disaffiliate from the WCOTP and join the IFFTU.

On January 26, 1993, the WCOTP and IFFTU merged at a convention in Stockholm to form Education International. The stronger membership of the IFFTU at WCOTP expense led both organizations to see merger as a resolution to continuing conflict and competition, and merger was strongly advocated by AFT president Albert Shanker. The collapse of Soviet bloc communist also helped to remove lingering political differences between the two groups (as well as the reason for the IFFTU's existence). Merger was first proposed in 1985, talks became serious in 1988, and merger achieved five years later. Shanker was elected EI's founding president.

== Structure ==
Education International is a democratic organization which is governed by a World Congress. Any national organization composed predominantly of teachers and/or education employees may belong. Each member is entitled to at least one delegate (up to a maximum of 50 delegates) for every 10,000 members or fraction thereof. Voting rights are more expansive than delegates, however. Each member with up to 5,000 members receives one vote, but organizations with more than 5,000 members receive an additional vote for every 5,000 members. There is no cap on the number of votes a member organization may cast. For large organizations (such as those in the United States, Canada and Europe), this means each delegate may cast tens or even hundreds of votes. A World Congress composed of delegates meets every three years, at a place set by the Executive Board. The World Congress elects the President, Vice Presidents, General Secretary and members of the Executive Board; determines the policies and program of the organization; and adopts the budget and sets membership fees.

An Executive Board governs the organization between meetings of the World Congress. In addition to the President and five Vice-Presidents, the Executive Board has two additional Board members elected from each region, nine at-large members, and the General Secretary. At least one member from each region must be a woman. The term of office for a board member is three years (the time between World Congresses), and members are limited to two consecutive terms. The Board meets at least once a year.

There are seven officers of EI. The President is the primary officer and spokesperson for the organization. The General Secretary is the primary executive officer, and has day-to-day oversight of EI. The EI constitution establishes five geographical regions, and each region is represented by a Vice-President. At least three of the six non-executive offices (e.g., President and Vice-Presidents) must be women. The officers and General Secretary must meet at least once a year, between Executive Board meetings.

EI's daily operations are overseen by a Secretariat. The Secretariat is run by a Deputy General Secretary appointed by the Executive Board in consultation with the General Secretary. The EI Secretariat is located in Brussels, Belgium. The regional offices are located in the following:

- Africa: Accra, Ghana
- Asia and the Pacific: Kuala Lumpur, Malaysia, and Fiji – The Council of Pacific Education (COPE)
- Europe: Brussels, Belgium
- Latin America: San José, Costa Rica
- North America and the Caribbean: St. Lucia.

The EI constitution also establishes largely autonomous regional structures to carry out work appropriate for each geographic region. Each regional body adopts its own constitution and by-laws (although these must be in accordance with the EI constitution), holds its own congresses and meetings, establishes dues and budgets, and carries out programs.

EI is affiliated with the International Trade Union Confederation and enjoys formal associate relations with UNESCO, including the International Bureau of Education (IBE), and has consultative status with the UN Economic and Social Council (ECOSOC).

== Leadership ==
=== General Secretaries ===
1992: Fred van Leeuwen
2018: David Edwards

=== Presidents ===
1992: Albert Shanker
1993: Mary Hatwood Futrell
2004: Thulas Nxesi
2009: Susan Hopgood
2024: Mugwena Maluleke

== See also ==
- World Teachers' Day
- European Trade Union Committee for Education
