= Harrow College =

Location
- Lowlands Road; Harrow, Middlesex, HA1 3AQ; England; 51°34′41″N 0°20′09″W

Information
- Type: Further Education
- Established: 1914-1987 – founding institutions 1999 – Harrow College; 2017 – constituent college of Harrow College & Uxbridge College; 2023 – constituent college of Harrow, Richmond & Uxbridge Colleges
- Local authority: Harrow
- Department for Education URN: 131864 Tables
- Ofsted: Reports
- Principal: Clive Hodge
- Gender: Coeducational
- Age: 16+
- Website: www.harrow.ac.uk

Harrow College is a further education college in England with two campuses (both in Harrow) - one at the foot of Harrow-on-the-Hill and the other in Harrow Weald. It was established in 1999 by the merger of two tertiary colleges; in 2017 it legally merged with Uxbridge College, and in 2023 merged with Richmond upon Thames College, forming Harrow, Richmond & Uxbridge Colleges (HRUC).

Harrow College is (as of 2013) medium-sized and had over 2,400 full-time and 4,700 part-time learners. It also forms part of the London Borough of Harrow's Harrow Sixth Form Collegiate.

== History ==
The college can date back to the early 20th century; Harrow County School for Girls was founded in Lowlands Road near present-day Harrow town centre in 1914, while Harrow Weald County Grammar School was opened in Brookshill, Harrow Weald in 1933. Until the 1970s these were grammar schools before a re-organisation turned them into sixth form colleges called Lowlands and Harrow Weald respectively.

In 1987 the tertiary colleges Greenhill College and Weald College were established in their place when the borough of Harrow adopted a tertiary provision system. A third tertiary college called Elm Park College was also established, while the former Hatch End-based Harrow College for Further Education closed down to make way for these, and the Catholic St Dominic's Sixth Form College remained unaffected by the tertiary system. Greenhill and Weald colleges eventually merged on 1 August 1999, creating Harrow College.

On 1 August 2017, Harrow College merged with Uxbridge College to form Harrow College & Uxbridge College (HCUC).

On 4 January 2023, HCUC merged with Richmond upon Thames College to form Harrow, Richmond & Uxbridge Colleges (HRUC).

== Location ==
Teaching takes place at the Harrow on the Hill campus on Lowlands Road and at the Harrow Weald campus in Harrow Weald as well as two smaller, dedicated construction-focused units; Whitefriars Centre and Harrow Skills Centre.

In 2015, the college opened two new buildings: The Enterprise Centre at the Harrow on the Hill campus and Spring House for supported learning at the Harrow Weald campus.

Harrow College has been awarded a Centre of Excellence for the Hearing Impaired, which is the only centre of its kind in North West London.

It holds the Pre School Learning Alliance kite mark.

== Curriculum ==
Harrow College provides academic and vocational courses for young people and a range of professional and non-professional programmes for adult students. The college is highly regarded for its ESOL (English for speakers of other languages) and EFL (English as a Foreign Language) courses. The EFL programmes are accredited by the British Council. The Learning Links programme has set a standard in the community for providing courses for students with learning disabilities and difficulties.

== Alumni ==
The list includes former students of Greenhill College and Weald College.

- Jon Foo, actor and martial artist
- Shami Chakrabarti, former director of Liberty
- Kevin Fong, medic and broadcaster
- Tom Fletcher, guitarist in McFly
- Richard Hounslow, British slalom canoeist
- Vilma Jackson (performance artist and actor)
- Farkhunda Zahra Naderi, Afghan former MP, politician and Women's Rights activist
- Matt Lucas, comedian
- Faye McClelland, British triathlete
- Mark Ramprakash, English cricketer
- Master Shortie, rapper
- Paul Staines, political blogger under the name Guido Fawkes
- Jordanne Whiley, Paralympian
- Ricardo P. Lloyd, British actor

=== Harrow County Grammar School for Girls ===
- Diane Abbott
- Carole Jordan
- Lucy Oldfield

=== Harrow Weald County Grammar School ===
- Michael Annals, costume designer
- Dudley Bright, Principal Trombone, London Symphony Orchestra
- Spencer Campbell, television producer and director
- Ken Follett, spy novel author
- Robert Glenister, actor
- Christopher Isham, theoretical physicist at Imperial College London, who investigates quantum gravity
- Prof Roger Kain CBE, Montefiore Professor of Geography at the School of Advanced Study (SAS)
- Ronald Lacey, actor, who played Harris in Porridge
- Prof David Pearce (economist), Professor of Economics from 1983 to 2004 at UCL
- Merlyn Rees, Home Secretary from 1976 to 1979 and Labour MP from 1962 to 1983 for Leeds South and from 1983 to 1992 for Morley and Leeds South (and later taught economics at the school for eleven years throughout the 1950s)
- Michael Rosen, author
- Prof Anthony Thirlwall, Professor of Applied Economics from 1976 to 2004 at the University of Kent, known for Thirlwall's Law
- Nigel Waymouth, designerKing Ghazi of Iraq also graduated from it when he was studying while he was the crown prince

== Former teachers ==
- James N. Britton, taught English at Harrow Weald GS from 1933 to 1938
- Harold Rosen (educationalist) (Harrow Weald Grammar School)
