= Stanmore College =

Coordinates: 51.613°N 0.311°W

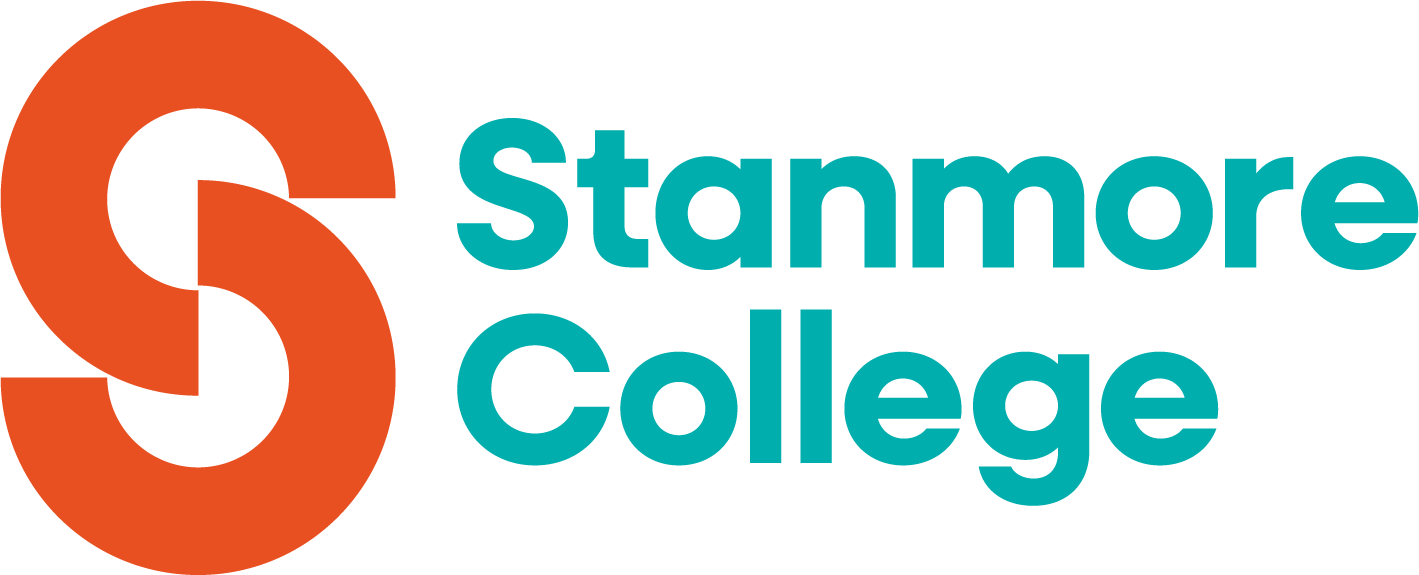

Location
- Old Church lane Stanmore, Middlesex, HA7 4BQ; England

Information
- Type: Further Education
- Motto: Your future starts here
- Established: 1969 – sixth form college 1987 – tertiary college
- Local authority: Harrow
- Department for Education URN: 130440 Tables
- Ofsted: Reports
- Chairman of the Governors: Mrs Hannah Butland
- Principal: Annette Cast
- Gender: Mixed
- Age: 16+
- Enrolment: 2,500 (2020)
- Colours: Teal, Coral
- Website: http://www.stanmore.ac.uk/

Stanmore College is a college for further education in the London Borough of Harrow. It was established in 1987 as one of the borough's three tertiary colleges, originally called Elm Park College. In 1994 it was renamed to its present name to facilitate closer representation to the local community of Stanmore.

The college was rated 'Good' by Ofsted in 2017 and its self-assessment rated it 'Outstanding' in 2020. Students are recruited locally and beyond including a significant amount from Brent, Barnet and Hertfordshire.

As of 2017 there were 1,800 learners, of which just under 1,000 were on full-time 16-18 study programmes. It forms part of the Harrow Sixth Form Collegiate.

== History ==
The college started in 1969 as Harrow Junior College, built in a residential area between Elm Park, Old Church Lane and The Ridgeway. It was notably the first purpose-built sixth form college in the country. It was soon renamed Stanmore Junior College and by 1974 became Stanmore Sixth Form College.

Following the borough's restructuring of post-16 education in 1987, Stanmore Sixth Form College was replaced by a new tertiary college named Elm Park College. It was one of three created by Harrow, the others being Greenhill College and Weald College (both later merged into Harrow College). Elm Park College was renamed Stanmore College on 1 January 1994.

In January 2000 the institute became legally divided between Stanmore Sixth Form College and Stanmore Adult College, for sixth form and adult students respectively. The two merged back into one organisation in 2007. At the time, the college self-styled itself as “the Small College for Big Achievers”. Its A-level pass rate was 99.8% that year.

Stanmore College was one of 16 colleges chosen in the country to receive funding through a programme launched by Boris Johnson, meaning the college will undergo refurbishment.

=== List of Principals ===
- Mr John Day (1967-1987)
- Mr John Mitchell (1987–1989)
- Mr Russell Woodrow (1989–2006)
- Mrs Jacqui Mace (2006–2016)
- Mrs Sarbdip Noonan (2016–2022)
- Mrs Annette Cast (2022-)

== Curriculum ==
Stanmore College provides a wide range of academic and vocational courses, catering to both 16-18-year-old students and adult learners. The college offers full-time study programs designed to help students progress into higher education or employment.

=== 16-18 Education at Stanmore College ===
Stanmore College supports school leavers with a variety of study options, including:

- BTEC Diplomas (Level 1 to Level 3)
- T Levels in Business, Accounting, Digital Software Development, Health, Education and Childcare
- Vocational courses in Business, Science, IT, Media, and more
- GCSE Retakes for students needing to improve their grades

=== T Level Courses – Industry-Focused Qualifications ===
Stanmore College is a leading provider of T Levels, which are two-year technical qualifications developed in collaboration with employers to prepare students for careers in key industries. These courses combine classroom learning with a substantial industry placement, ensuring students gain real-world experience alongside their studies.

The college offers T Levels in the following areas:

- Accounting
- Business
- Early Years Education & Childcare
- Engineering
- IT and Digital Software Development
- Health and Social Care
- Science

T Levels provide an alternative to A Levels, offering a direct route into skilled employment, university, or higher technical education.

=== Adult Learning and Professional Courses ===
For adult learners, the college offers:

- Essential Digital Skills
- Part-time and evening courses for upskilling and career progression
- Access to Higher Education Diplomas (for those looking to enter university without traditional qualifications)
- English & Maths (Functional Skills and GCSEs)
- ESOL (English for Speakers of Other Languages)
- Teacher Training

Stanmore College provides flexible learning options to support adult learners in gaining new qualifications, changing careers, or progressing to higher education.

== Facilities and New Build ==
In September 2024, Stanmore College initiated a comprehensive redevelopment project aimed at modernizing its campus facilities. The £60 million project, funded by the Department for Education's Further Education Improvement Programme, involves the phased demolition of six existing buildings—Oak, Elm, Spruce, Rowan, Willow, and the Boiler building—and the construction of five interconnected blocks, each up to four storeys high.

The redevelopment is designed to provide modern classrooms, recreational areas, and sports facilities such as a gym, health and wellbeing studios, and dance/yoga studios.

Construction is scheduled to be completed by summer 2027, with the college remaining operational throughout the process to ensure continuity of education.

== Notable alumni ==
- Tony McNulty - Politician
- Sushil Wadhwani - Economist
- Taio Cruz - Musician
