= Harold Rosen =

Harold Rosen may refer to:

- Harold Rosen (educationalist) (1919–2008), American born, British socialist educationalist
- Harold Rosen (electrical engineer) (1926–2017), American, known as "the father of the geostationary satellite"
- Harold Rosen (businessman), Executive Director of the Grassroots Business Fund
- Harold Rosen (politician) (1906–1989), member of the Massachusetts House of Representatives
- Harold Rosen (mayor) (1925–2018), mayor of Miami Beach, Florida
