= James N. Britton =

British educator (1908–1994)

James Nimmo Britton BA MA LL.D.
- Born: 18 May 1908; Scarborough, North Yorkshire, England
- Died: 28 February 1994 (aged 85); London, England
- Other name: Jimmy
- Occupation: Educator
- Title: Professor
- Board member of: Bullock Committee
- Spouse: Muriel Robertson
- Children: Celia Britton; Alison Britton
- Relatives: Clare Winnicott (sister); Karl Britton (brother)

Academic background
- Education: University College London (BA, MA)
- Influences: George Kelly, Lev Vygotsky

Academic work
- Discipline: English, Pedagogy
- Institutions: London University: – Institute of Education and Goldsmiths
- Main interests: Poetry, Literature
- Notable works: Language and Learning (1970)
- Notable ideas: Theory of Language and Learning, Cognitive Writing Theory

James Nimmo Britton (18 May 1908 – 28 February 1994) was a British educator at the UCL Institute of Education whose theory of language and learning helped guide research in school writing, while shaping the progressive teaching of language, writing, and literature in both England and the United States after the Dartmouth Conference (1966) of Anglo-American English educators.

== Biography ==
=== Early life ===
James Nimmo Britton was born in Scarborough, England, on 18 May 1908, the second of the four children of James Nimmo Britton (1873–1945), Baptist minister, and his wife, Elsie Clare (1884–1956), daughter of the Revd William Slater, Baptist minister. His older sister was Clare Winnicott née Britton who became an acclaimed psychoanalyst whilst his younger brother Karl Britton became a philosopher.

=== Education and teaching ===
He graduated with a B.A. honours degree in English from University College London, where he held the Campbell Clarke Scholarship and the John Oliver Hobbes Memorial Scholarship. From 1933–1938, he taught English at Harrow Weald County Grammar School, in the state educational system. It was during this time that Britton wrote his first work, English on the Anvil, in which Britton studied the common errors made by pupils and wrote a series of exercises where students deduced how to apply grammar themselves instead of learning by rote the rules of grammar.

=== Editor and military service ===
In 1938, Britton left his teaching post to become education editor for the publishers John Murray of London. Soon afterwards, he joined the Royal Air Force in World War II. Record and Recall: A Cretan Memoir (1988) details an episode in his war experiences when he escaped being captured by German paratroopers who invaded the island of Crete where he helped to staff a radar station in 1941. Returning from overseas, Britton worked at John Murray for several years before completing his M.A. at the University of London. From 1948–1952 he also taught education at the Birmingham College of Art.

=== Academia ===
In 1954, Britton joined the English Education Department at the University of London Institute of Education where he spent the rest of his career, becoming Reader in Education, head of department, and eventually the Goldsmiths Professor.

Owing to his wide international reputation, Britton served as a visiting scholar in numerous institutions around the English-speaking world. In 1963, he worked with teachers in South Africa and later in Australia to advise and consult. In Canada, he was especially associated with the University of British Columbia, the University of Calgary, and the Ontario Institute of Education. In the United States, he spoke at numerous National Council of Teachers of English (NCTE) conferences and held many visiting professorships, notably at Bread Loaf Writers' Conference and New York University. The University of Calgary awarded him an honorary LL.D., and he received NCTE's David H. Russell award in 1977 for Distinguished Research in the Teaching of English. A collection of language & learning essays, The Word for Teaching Is Learning, was published in 1988 to honour his eightieth birthday. In addition, the Conference on English Education recognises Britton's important influence on English teachers throughout the world by annually selecting a winner of the James N. Britton Award for Inquiry in English Language Arts.

=== Language and learning ===
Font-cover of original hardback of James Britton's seminal work – Language and Learning (1970)

Britton's classic study Language and Learning (1970; 2nd Ed., 1992), contains his most fully developed statement about the relationship between children's active language use and their learning. Drawing on extensive samples of actual speech and writing done by his two daughters when they were growing up (Celia Britton, formerly Professor of French, University of Aberdeen, Scotland, and Alison Britton, one of England's leading ceramic artists), Britton showed how individuals use words to make both practical and moral sense of the world. He also helped to introduce, and make accessible, important psychological thinkers in the area of language, identity, and society, from the American George Kelly to the Russian Lev Vygotsky.

=== Learning to write ===
During the 1970s, he headed a major research group (including colleagues Nancy Martin and Harold Rosen) for the British Schools Council, which examined the instructional role of writing in the British Schools. This led to the publication of The Development of Writing Abilities, 11–18 in 1975 and the refinement of his theory of language use, which distinguished between participant and spectator language roles. This work helped teachers to see the importance of having students use expressive language and foregrounded the crucial role of audience in the development of language abilities. At this time, Britton was also an active member of the Bullock Committee, which issued its influential report, A Language for Life, in 1975. A central tenet of the report was the concept of 'language across the curriculum' - well beyond 'English', which was an idea adopted from the theories espoused by Britton.

=== Poetry and storytelling ===
Published in 1957, one of Britton's first works was a carefully selected and graded four part anthology of verse for juniors which both attested to his passion for poetry and his desire to champion the creative aspects of English. Britton returned to this, his foremost pleasure, at the end of his life by gathering together all the verse he had written over more than fifty years and publishing The Flight-Path of My Words: Poems 1940–1992 (1994), his final book. In between, Britton also academically explored the importance of poems and stories in people's lives, through his selected essays in Prospect and Retrospect (1982), and with his penultimate book, Literature in Its Place (1993).

=== Professional bodies ===
Britton also worked hard at establishing professional networks for teachers of English. In 1947, he helped found the London Association for the Teaching of English (LATE), which eventually led to the founding of the National Association for the Teaching of English (NATE) in the UK in 1963. His commitment to helping initiate and sustain an international conversation among teachers of English began with his role as a member of the British delegation to the Dartmouth Conference of 1966. In 1971, at the University of York, Britton was a key supporter of the first grassroots International Conference with its call for language and writing across the curriculum. In 1984, he edited English Teaching: An International Exchange for the International Federation for the Teaching of English (IFTE).

== Collections ==
Britton's personal papers are held at the Institute of Education (IOE), University College London. The archive primarily focuses on Britton's time at the IOE, but also contains materials relating to his publications, correspondence, and involvement at conferences.

== See also ==
- Clare Winnicott

== Bibliography ==
- Britton, J. (1934). English on the Anvil, A Language and Composition Course for Secondary Schools. London: Foyle.
- Britton, J. (1963). Literature. In Britton, J. (Ed.), The arts and current trends in education. London: Evans.
- Britton, J. (1970). Language and learning. London: Allen Lane. [2nd ed., 1992, Portsmouth NH: Boynton/Cook, Heinemann.]
- Britton, J. (1978). I'm Listening. The Journal/Le Journal, (May) 33–36.
- Britton, J. (1982). Prospect and retrospect: Selected essays of James Britton. G. Pradl, Ed. Montclair, NJ: Boynton/Cook.
- Britton, J. (1984). Viewpoints: The distinction between participant and spectator role language in research and practice. Research in the Teaching of English. 18(3), 320–331.
- Britton, J. (1988). Record and Recall: A Cretan Memoir. London: Lightfoot Publishing.
- Britton, J. (1993). Literature in its place. Portsmouth NH: Boynton/Cook, Heinemann.
- Britton, J. (1994). The Flight-Path of My Words: Poems 1940–1992. Bristol, England: Loxwood Stoneleigh.
- Britton, J., Martin, N., & Rosen, H. (1966). Multiple marking of English compositions. London: Schools Council Examinations Bulletin 12, H.M.S.O.
- Britton, J., Burgess, A., Martin, N., McLeod A., & Rosen, R. (1975). The development of writing abilities, 11–18. London: Macmillan Education for the Schools Council.
