= Richmond upon Thames College =

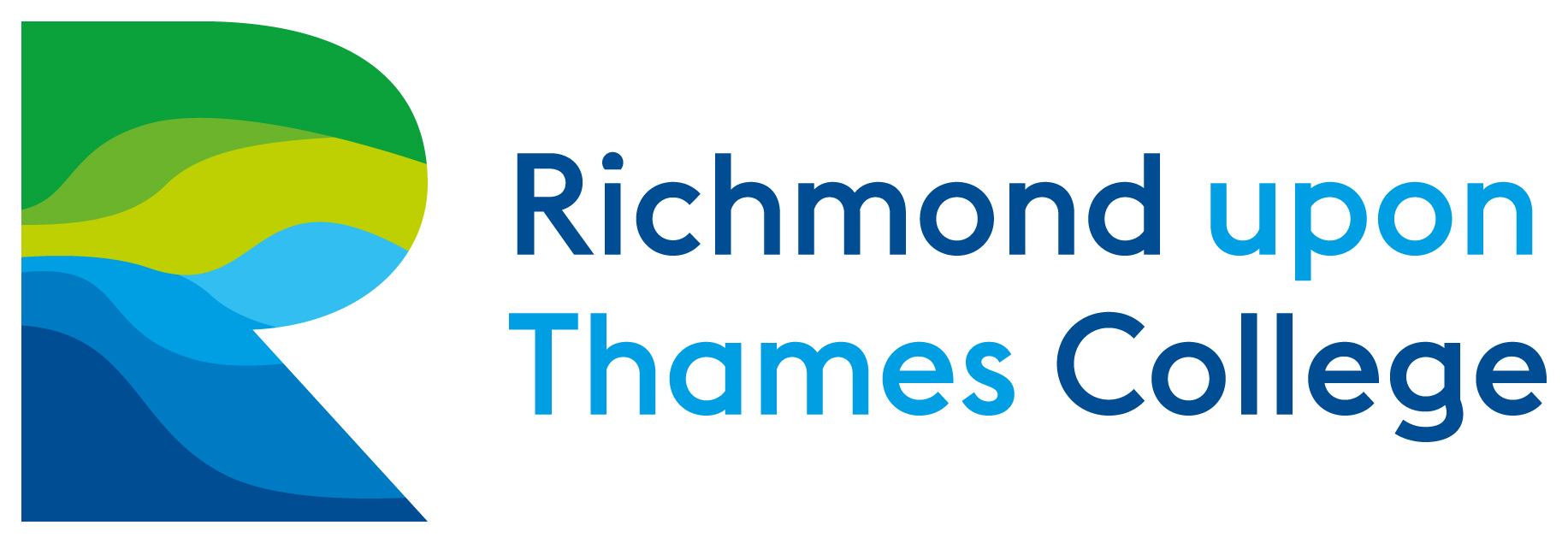
- The new Richmond upon Thames building that opened in spring 2020

Location
- Twickenham, Greater London; England; 51°27′04″N 0°20′28″W

Information
- Type: Public further education college
- Established: 1895 – founding institutions 1977 – Richmond upon Thames tertiary college 2023 – constituent college of Harrow, Richmond & Uxbridge Colleges
- Principal: Gavin Hughes
- Enrollment: 3,600+ (2017)
- Website: www.rutc.ac.uk

Richmond upon Thames College is a large college of further and higher education located on a single site in Twickenham. It provides education and training to 16- to 18-year-olds and adults from across the London Borough of Richmond upon Thames and further afield. The college offers a range of academic and technical vocational qualifications, including A Levels, technical vocational qualifications, higher education courses and apprenticeships. Since 2023, the college is part of a newly merged group with Harrow College and Uxbridge College.

== History ==
The college was formed in 1977 by a merger of the sixth form colleges from Shene School and Thames Valley School with the former Twickenham College of Technology on its site. It was the first tertiary college established in Greater London.

A merger with Richmond Adult & Community College was proposed in 2003 but did not happen. In November 2020, Richmond upon Thames College announced a proposed merger with Harrow College & Uxbridge College (HCUC) that could be completed for autumn 2021 pending confirmation.

An £80 million redevelopment of the 22-acre campus kicked off in 2018. The first phase of the new campus was completed in spring 2020, and further new parts were scheduled to be opened in 2021 and 2022.

A merger with Harrow College & Uxbridge College (HCUC) was confirmed in 2021. The new institution, Harrow, Richmond & Uxbridge Colleges (HRUC), was created on 4 January 2023.

== Location ==
The college is situated in Twickenham, Greater London, a third of a mile from the English national rugby stadium. The nearest railway station is Twickenham and the nearest London Underground connections are Richmond and Hounslow Central. It is also served by London Buses routes, notably the 281 between Tolworth and Twickenham and the 267 between Fulwell and Hammersmith.

== External inspections ==
The college received a "good" rating in all areas from Ofsted in its November 2017 report.

== Notable alumni ==
- Biig Piig (born 1998), musician
- Jen Brister, stand-up comedian
- James Cripps, musician and artist
- Ray Dorset, founder of Mungo Jerry (as Twickenham College of Technology)
- Caroline Flint (born 1961), Labour Party politician who served as Member of Parliament (MP) for Don Valley from 1997 to 2019
- Lawrence Insula, musician and record producer
- Lava La Rue (born 1998), musician and director
- Alan Mehdizadeh (born 1982), stage and screen actor
- David Orobosa Omoregie (born 1998), musician
- Fionn Whitehead (born 1997), actor
