= Clare Winnicott =

Social worker and psychoanalyst (1906–1984)

Clare Winnicott OBE
- Born: Clare Nimmo Britton; 30 September 1906; Scarborough, Yorkshire, England
- Died: 17 April 1984 (aged 77); North Cheam, Sutton, Surrey, England
- Occupations: Social worker, university teacher and psychoanalyst
- Spouse: Donald Woods Winnicott (m. 1951; died 1971)
- Relatives: Karl Britton (brother); James Nimmo Britton (brother)

Clare Winnicott, OBE (born Clare Nimmo Britton; 30 September 1906 – 17 April 1984) was an English social worker, civil servant, psychoanalyst and teacher. She played a pivotal role in the passing of the Children Act 1948. Alongside her husband, D. W. Winnicott, Clare would go on to become a prolific writer and prominent social worker and children's advocate in 20th century England.

== Early life ==
Born in the northern seaside town of Scarborough, Yorkshire and nicknamed "Elsie", Clare was the eldest of four children. Her father, James Nimmo Britton, a Scot who had migrated south, was a gifted Baptist cleric whose oratory skills led to considerable growth in attendance at the numerous churches to which he had been assigned. Her mother was Elsie Clare Slater. James Britton also founded the Avenue Baptist church in Southend-on-Sea where the Britton family was very socially involved. In 1949, Clare's mother was elected the first woman deacon of the Avenue Baptist Church. Clare's skills as a talented communicator and compassionate guardian of those in need can be drawn back to the example set by her mother and father throughout her life as young adult. As a teenager Clare was a leader in her Sunday school, and actively participated in the Christian youth organization, the Girls' Brigade.

Throughout the 1926 General Strike and the Great Depression, the church worked to support the men and women of Great Britain. The church hosted dinners for women who could not afford food and helped unemployed men find work, all organized by Clare's father. Clare's father retired in 1935, and died in 1945.

Clare's family moved frequently during her childhood, first to Clapham, South London in 1912 during World War I. The war had a profound impact on the Britton family as widespread rationing took a heavy toll on the family's standard of living and culminated in the loss of Clare's uncle during the fighting on the Western Front with the British Expeditionary Force. At the conclusion of the war, Clare's family moved to Southend-on-Sea, Essex where she completed high school in 1925.

== Early career and LSE training ==
Clare went on to attend Selly Oak College in Birmingham, a Baptist affiliated school, and earned her qualification as a teacher from 1929 to 1930. After graduating she went to Norwich where she worked for the Young Women's Christian Association from 1931 to 1937. After taking a one-year social science course at the London School of Economics (LSE) from 1937 to 1938, she worked in Merthyr Tydfil, Wales with the Commissioners for Special Areas to assist unemployed juveniles in finding work. While the region continued to suffer the economic hardships of the Great Depression, she instituted the "Boot and Shoe Fund" in order to provide children's shoes for affected families.

=== World War II and evacuees ===
In 1940, during the Second World War, she returned to the LSE to train for a career in social work. She enrolled in the thirteen-month mental health course, Britain's top programme for psychiatric social work. The course included psychoanalytic theory under educational psychologist and psychoanalyst Susan Isaacs, a pupil of John Carl Flugel, who published studies on the intellectual and social development of children and promoted the Nursery school movement. Clare also worked under the child psychiatrist Mildred Creak, who is known for the development of diagnostic criteria for autism. While on the course Clare was recognized as a gifted student, described by one classmate, Marjorie Jones, as "academically brilliant".

The London School of Economics also suffered as a result of the war, and the programme had to be suspended for a year as the school relocated to Cambridge. The school's departments were divided and spread across the campus leaving the students in the social work program isolated. Not only did the war affect the school Clare attended, but the impacts of the Blitz would also find their way to Clare personally and leave a lasting impression on her as a young woman. During the German Luftwaffe's bombing of Great Britain, Clare's maternal grandparents fled Southend-on-Sea after their house was damaged by bomb blasts. The early years of the Second World War proved intensely destructive in her life as, by 1941, her maternal grandmother had died and her younger brother had narrowly evaded capture by German troops during the Battle of Crete.

Unlike her classmates Clare did not pursue a career in a mental health clinic or hospital setting on completing the LSE course. Having witnessed firsthand how the war forced countless English families to evacuate their homes, fathers and brothers sent away to war, while mothers joined the workforce on the Home front, and a great number of children were left separated from their families, she believed that she could make more of an impact with her training by aiding the evacuations with the National Association for Mental Health. She then moved to the Midlands to take a position with the regional health authority. After a few months, she was ordered to assist with the Oxfordshire evacuation scheme. This involved organising care for over eighty children affected by the evacuation. In Oxfordshire she met Donald Winnicott, a medical supervisor, who visited every Friday to check up on the evacuation scheme in the area. Clare explained her ideas about children channeled into the evacuation system and Dr. Winnicott, a paediatrician, shared this vision.

== Work with Donald Winnicott ==
Donald and Clare collaborated on the article, "The Problem of Homeless Children." The article describes the responsibilities of a social worker in the evacuation scheme as well as impacts of the war on child behavior. Many colleagues of Clare and Donald expressed that their ability to collaborate effectively was unparalleled. In 1945, the death of a child in the English foster care system opened a widespread investigation in which Clare participated as a member of the committee investigating the incident alongside Winnicott, whom she had worked with previously on evacuation. The committee, The Report of the Care of Children Committee, discovered over 100,000 children in need of foster care or adoption placement in England and Wales. The committee's findings sent shockwaves across Britain and ultimately led to the passing of the Children Act 1948, an act of Parliament which established a comprehensive childcare service in the United Kingdom. The committee also continued to train social workers and staff on the changing childcare system. The London School of Economics collaborated with the committee to establish Britain's first programme for the education of social workers in the new children's departments. Clare, having gained the respect of the academic and social work communities, was appointed the first "Lecturer in Charge" of the new course. The programme included classes in Child development, legal issues, and sociology. In her courses, she avoided abstractions such as psychoanalytic theory and focused on her students' work in childcare. Donald Winnicott also taught on this programme and, having worked extensively together both in teaching and on the committee, Clare and Donald Winnicott were married on 28 December 1951.

== Work with disrupted children ==
Along with her work on the evacuation scheme, Winnicott also worked with other children including juvenile delinquents, mentally disabled children, and children in foster care. She also took time to work with special mental health cases including enuretics and through therapeutic regression. With each intervention, she realized that environmental changes could have a therapeutic effect. As she gained awareness of the inner world of children, she began to put together her own theories in which she later discussed the importance of "transitional objects."

In her 1945 paper, "Children Who Cannot Play", she discussed the loss or removal of "loved" or attachment items such as blankets or specific toys and how this can impact a child's emotions and behaviour. Even though she had at that stage minimal familiarity with psychoanalytic theory, she elaborated an Object Relations Theory in her paper and drew parallels with her observations.

=== Post-war ===
After the war, she continued to work with children on the evacuation scheme, in foster care, and adoption. This involved work with the Civil Resettlement Units of the War Office in Kingston-on-Thames. She helped assist British Army personnel who had been prisoners of war who had endured psychological trauma. She noted similarities between the men returning home and the children she had worked with previously and drew parallels between the soldiers and deprived children. During this time, her work began to attract public attention.

In 1946, she began teaching a course alongside Leslie Bell at the University of London entitled, "The Child in the Family and the Community." She focused on child development, more specifically child attachment and the importance of play within a child's social group. In 1946, she joined the education department of the National Association of Mental Health to offer courses for staff and childcare workers.

=== Teaching at LSE ===
Clare Winnicott's was appointed to lead the programme on a new social work programme at the London School of Economics (LSE) in 1947. She became well known across the United Kingdom, and this led to invitations to lecture at other universities. One of her students in that period was Olive Stevenson who would become highly influential as a Social Policy academic and administrator.

In 1954, she presented her work at a United Nations seminar on social work. She wrote a paper, "Casework Techniques in the Child Care Services," after her address at the 1954 United Nations Seminar on European Social Services. Her paper was well received and later published in academic journals in Britain and in the United States. New trends led to the closure of the childcare course at the LSE in 1958. It coincided with a forced leave of absence due to meningitis.

=== Psychoanalytic training ===
In 1949, she embarked on a training in psychoanalysis with W. Clifford M. Scott, an analysand of Melanie Klein. She wanted to learn Kleinian analysis but was disappointed when Scott did not work in the expected manner. Scott returned to Canada and she sought to work with Klein herself. After finally working with Klein, she was again disappointed to find Klein's theories focused almost entirely on negative aspects of child health.

She continued her own training with the British Psychoanalytical Society. With her husband she continued to teach at the LSE until 1964. Her 1959 paper, "The Development of Insight", referred among others, to Anna Freud. The implied criticism of Kleinian theory eventually led to a rift between Clare Winnicott and Mrs Klein.

=== Civil service ===
In 1960, having completed her clinical training, she applied for a government post. In 1963 Beti Jones, president of the childcare social work association, backed her for a leading post at the Home Office which she gained in 1964 and led to her re-organising social work training. The 1968 Seebohm Report led to the amalgamation of government social work tasks. Partly as a result, Winnicott lost her post, but she was awarded the Order of the British Empire.

=== DW Winnicott dies ===
Following her husband's death in 1971, she lost her job at the Home Office and returned to psychoanalysis and briefly to the LSE as head of the social work department. The year of her husband's death was also the year she was awarded the Order of the British Empire, which he was unable to witness. For about ten years she taught and supervised in the psychoanalytic section of the British Association of Psychotherapists (BAP).

She ran a small analytic practice and offered clinical supervision to colleagues until she died as a result of skin cancer on April 15, 1984.

== Legacy ==
Clare Winnicott's contributions had a profound impact on childcare and social work, particularly through her contributions to the Curtis Committee, and at the Home Office.

Joel Kanter has argued that Winnicott's legacy as a psychoanalyst suffered due to the more prominent standing of her husband. Others, such as Brett Kahr and F Robert Rodman, have noted her influence over the work of her husband.

The Clare Winnicott Prize, named in her honour, was instituted in 1986 by "GAPS" (Group for the Advancement of Psychodynamics and Psychotherapy in Social Work, inspired by Clare Winnicott and founded in 1971 by Sally Hornby) for an innovative essay on a social work theme by a previously unpublished social work practitioner or student. The award includes publication of the piece in The Journal of Social Work Practice.

== Selected writings ==
- C. Britton and D. W. Winnicott, "The problem of homeless children". The New Era in Home and School 25, 1944, 155–161
- C. Britton, 'Children who cannot play' (London 1945)
- C. Britton, 'Remarks' in "The Oxfordshire Hostels Scheme". Report of Child Guidance Inter Clinic Conference. 1946, 29–35, 42–43
- C. Britton, "Residential management as treatment for difficult children". Human Relations 1 (1), 1947, 2–12
- C. Britton, "Child care" in C. Morris (ed.): Social Work in Great Britain. London 1950
- C. Winnicott, "Casework techniques in the child care services". Social Casework, 36 (1), 1955, 3–13
- C. Winnicott, Child Care and Social Work: A Collection of Papers Written between 1954 and 1963. Hertfordshire: 1964
- C. Winnicott "Communicating with children (I)". Child Care Quarterly Review 18 (3), 1964, 85–93
- C. Winnicott "Communicating with children (II)". Social Work Today 8 (26), 1977, 7–11
- C. Winnicott, 'Fear of Breakdown: A Clinical Example'. International journal of psychoanalysis. 61 (1980). 351–357
- D. W. Winnicott. "A reflection" in S. Grolnick and L. Barkin (eds.) Between Fantasy and Reality. Transitional Objects and Phenomena. New York: 1978, 15–33

== Bibliography ==
Works about Clare Britton Winnicott:

- Kanter, Joel (1 September 2000). "The Untold Story of Clare and Donald Winnicott: How Social Work Influenced Modern Psychoanalysis". Clinical Social Work Journal. 28 (3): 245–261. doi:10.1023/A:1005179617180. S2CID 140946855.
- Kanter, Joel |(ed.) Face to Face with Children. The Life and Work of Clare Winnicott. London, New York: Routledge 2004. ISBN 978-1855759978

== See also ==
- James Robertson
- Michael Eigen
