= SGT =

SGT may refer to

- Sergeant, a rank in many uniformed organizations
- Scotland's Great Trails
- Singapore Time or Singapore Standard Time
- Society of Glass Technology
