= Margaret Amosu =

British-Nigerian librarian

- Born: 3 August 1920; Ilford, England
- Died: 2005 (aged 84–85)
- Education: Harrow Weald County School
- Occupation: Librarian
- Employer: University of Ibadan Chester Beatty Cancer Research Institute
- Spouse: Nunasu Amosu
- Children: 1

Margaret Amosu (3 August 1920 – 2005) was a British-Nigerian librarian. She was librarian at the University of Ibadan from 1963 to 1977.

== Life ==
Margaret Amosu was born on 3 August 1920 in Ilford, near London. She was educated at Harrow Weald County School, where she was taught by James Britten, Nancy Martin and Harold Rosen. In 1938 she joined the Land Army and then worked as a riveter in an aircraft factory. A Communist, trade unionist and internationalist, as shop steward, she ensured women workers received the full rate for their factory jobs.

In 1944 she fell in love with Arthur Melzer, a Czechoslovak communist. In 1945 he discovered that his family had survived German occupation, and returned to them, days before the birth of his daughter Vaughan. Struggling against prejudice as an unmarried mother, Margaret became librarian at the Chester Beatty Cancer Research Institute in 1948. In 1957 she married the Nigerian anti-colonial activist Nunasu Amosu, who was studying in Britain. Their daughter, Akwemaho, was born in 1960, and in 1963 she moved to Ibadan and became librarian at the University of Ibadan. There she published a bibliography of African creative writing, helped develop an Africa-centred curriculum, and oversaw the building of a new library as medical librarian of the country's main teaching hospital.

In 1977 she returned to England, becoming librarian of Phaidon Press in Oxford.

== Works ==
- A preliminary bibliography of creative African writing in the European languages, 1960
- Nigerian theses; a list of theses on Nigerian subjects and of theses by Nigerians, 1965
- (ed. with O. Soyinka and E. O. Osuniana) 25 years of medical research, 1948-1973 : a list of the papers published by past and present members of the Faculty of Medicine of the University of Ibadan from its foundation to November 1973, 1973
