= Curtis Report =

1946 report of a committee on childcare in the UK

The Curtis Report (1946) or the Report of the Care of Children Committee was the report of a committee investigating the care of children "deprived of a normal home life" in England and Wales. It set out expectations for the care of children in care both in the UK and child migrants.

== Context ==
Laws passed in the first decade of the 20th century provided free school meals and free medical inspection for children, taking steps to reduce child poverty beyond what the existing poor law provided. The Ursula Wise column written by Susan Isaacs in Nursery World, and Oliver Untwisted by Muriel Payne advocated for reform of care services.

The Beveridge Report of 1942 advocated the abolition of poor law, which had previously dealt with orphans and other children in need of state care. Some children would also be left homeless when evacuation came to an end, and there was no clear provision to deal with them.

Marjory Allen had campaigned actively on behalf of children in residential care and her letters in national newspapers had caused public scandal at the neglect of children and the lack of a government body to oversee their care.

The Dennis O'Neill case, when a 12-year-old died from abuse by his foster parents, further reinforced the need for changes to child services.

== Committee ==
Myra Curtis was appointed the head of the Care of Children Committee by the Home Secretary, Herbert Morrison, in December 1944. She was a former civil servant and the Principal of Newnham College, and had previously been a member of the committee chaired by Sir Godfrey Russell Vick to investigate remand homes for young offenders so had previous experience investigating residential children's homes. Other members included John Litten, the Principal of the National Children's Home, and Mrs Helen Murtagh, a Birmingham City Councillor and health visitor.

James Clyde, Baron Clyde led a similar investigation by the Committee on Homeless Children in Scotland.

The committee reviewed case files and reports, visited more than 400 institutions and foster homes, across 41 countries, and heard testimony from around 300 witnesses. Donald Winnicott and John Bowlby gave evidence, and the committee were particularly interested in hearing from Clare Britton, who had managed hostels for children during World War II.

== Report ==
The Curtis Report was made available to Members of Parliament on the 13 September 1946. It was critical of the poor conditions in many institutions and the lack of training for childcare providers. It noted that legislation had lagged behind public opinion on appropriate standards of care for children.

The Curtis Report recommended the appointment of children's officers specialising in childcare who would provide personal links between children and organisations. The committee calculated that 300 to 400 new child welfare professionals would be required and that training should begin urgently.

It recommended that the care of deprived children should be overseen by a single authority, which would be responsible for ensuring standards were met in both state and charitable organisations.

The report advocated that children be cared for in places like a "normal family home" such as foster care or adoption, in preference to institutions. It further stated that if institutions were necessary, they should be smaller-scale to provide better attention to each child. The report recommended that siblings should be kept together and that children should be able to keep in contact with relatives where that was safe, and to practice religion in a form appropriate to them. The new cottage homes were staffed by housemothers.

The Curtis Report also commented on children selected for migration, arguing that it was not a desirable method of dealing with children and that whilst it could remain an option for children who wanted to migrate, the government should ensure that standards of care and welfare be comparable to children remaining in the UK.

Curtis wrote a letter to accompany the report in which she asked the Home Secretary to create a separate Act dealing with the report's recommendations, in order to more clearly break from poor law.

== Impact ==
William Hare, 5th Earl of Listowel described the Curtis Report as "a landmark in the history of collective care of children, because it is the outcome of the first public inquiry wide enough in scope to cover every type and class of homeless child."

The Spectator and the Economist actively and promptly campaigned for changes to the law following the publication of the Curtis Report.

A Central Training Council in Child Care was created in 1946 to oversee training of people caring for children.

The Home Office Children Department Inspectorate was established to perform regular and integrated inspections of children's services. Superintendents were appointed in regional offices.

The Curtis Report was presented to the Labour government and led to the enactment of the Children Act 1948 in July 1948, which mandated that every local authority must set up a children's committee to protect children's interests. An Advisory Council on Child Care was created to advise the Home Secretary on good practice in childcare.

For her work on the committee, Myra Curtis was appointed DBE in 1949.

== See also ==
- Seebohm Report
- Child care in the United Kingdom
