= Alison Britton =

British ceramic artist

Alison Claire Britton OBE (born 4 May 1948) is a British ceramic artist, with an international reputation, known for her large sculptural, slab-built vessels.

== Biography ==
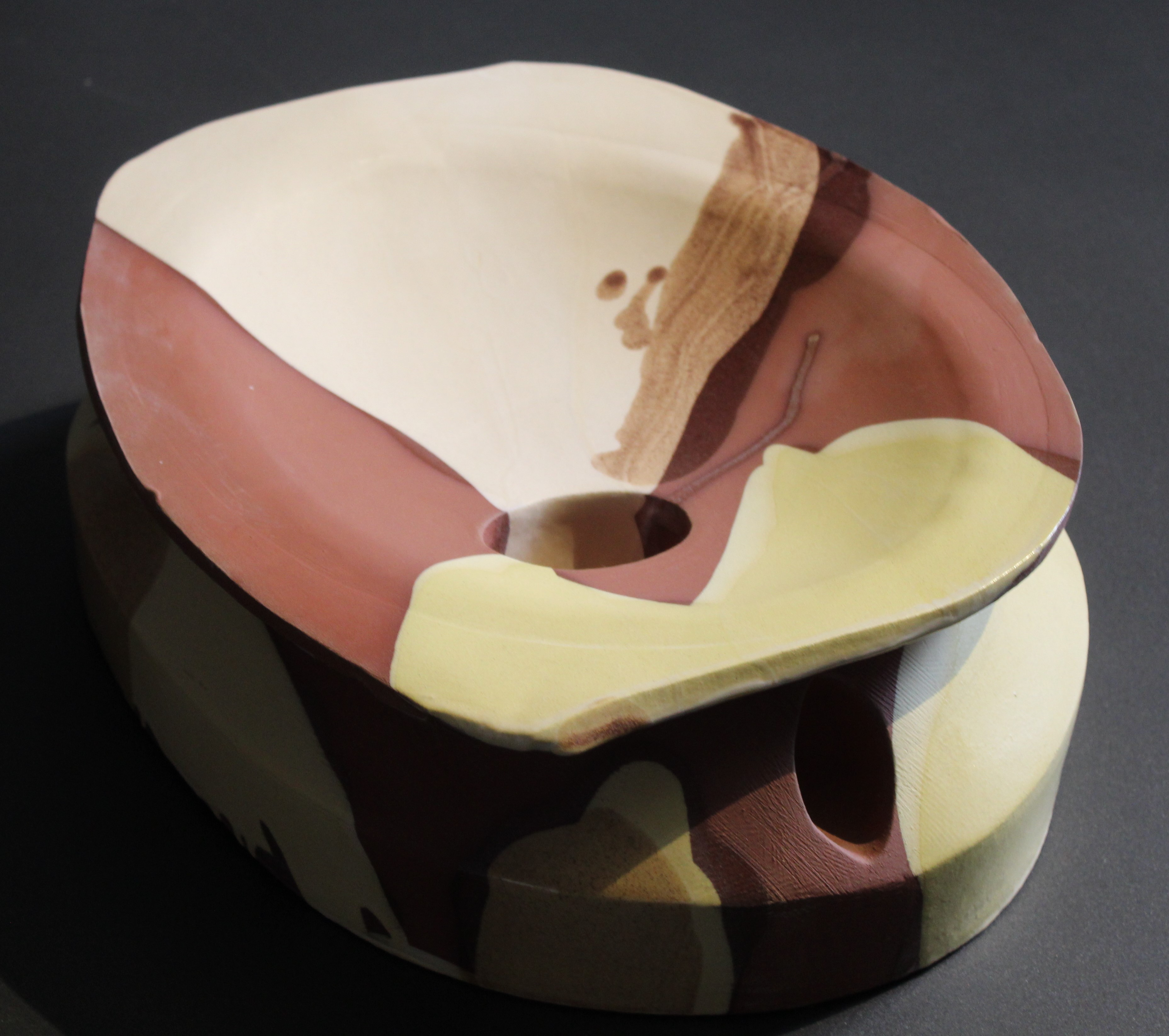
Ruse, 2012, Victoria and Albert Museum, London

Britton was born in Harrow, London, the daughter of the educationalist James N. Britton. She studied at the Leeds College of Art (1966–7), the Central School of Art and Design (1966–7) and the Royal College of Art (1970–73). She became a Fellow of the Royal College of Art in 1990 and has been a senior tutor there since 1998. She was awarded an OBE for her services to art in 1990. In 2019 she was awarded an honorary doctorate from the Royal College of Art.

Her work is found in several collections including the Victoria and Albert Museum in London, the British Council Collection and in the Los Angeles County Museum of Art.

== Bibliography ==
- Britton, Alison. Seeing Things: Collected Writing on Art, Craft and Design. London: Occasional Papers, 2013 ISBN 9780995473072
- Britton, Alison. Seeing Things: Collected Writing on Art, Craft and Design. (2nd Edition) London: Occasional Papers, 2022 ISBN 9780995473072
