= James Cripps =

British musician

James Cripps is an artist and musician from Kensal Rise, London. He studied at Richmond upon Thames College.

His 2009 art exhibition was with other young artists who went by the group name of 'Anklebiter'. The show received with acclaim, the center piece of his work being an abstract version of Bouguereau's The First Mourning.

Cripps fronted the punk band Stavin' Chains who cite their influences from Frank Sinatra to The Birthday Party. The BBC invited them to play The Roundhouse 2009 Emerging Proms The band was dissolved in 2011 when its members formed the band Dogfeet.
