= Housemother =

Caring occupation in British children's homes

Housemother was a job in British children's homes from the 1940s onwards. Housemothers were responsible for small groups of children living in children's homes. They lived in the same accommodation as the children, and in the first decades of the role were responsible for children during the night as well as the day. They carried out personal care tasks for children, and household chores.

The model of residential care managed by housemothers was established following the Curtis Report in 1946; the small group children's homes set up following this report were sometimes called cottage homes. From 1947, there were courses to qualify as a housemother in England and Wales, and in Scotland, such as the Certificate in the Residential Care of Children. There were sometimes assistant housemothers too. Following the Health and Safety at Work etc. Act 1974, housemothers were not always required to be on duty at night as well as in the day.
