= Michael Rosen's Sad Book =

2004 children's book by Michael Rosen

- Author: Michael Rosen
- Illustrator: Quentin Blake
- Publisher: Candlewick Press
- ISBN: 9780744598988
- LC Class: PZ7.R71867

Michael Rosen's Sad Book is a 2004 non-fiction book by English children's author Michael Rosen. Illustrated by Quentin Blake, the book deals with the topic of grief. Although it is marketed as a children's book, Rosen explicitly mentions on the inside book jacket that it is for everyone. The book chronicles Rosen's grief over the loss of his son Eddie, who died of meningococcal septicaemia aged 18.

== Overview ==
Rosen said that the book arose after a group of children asked him questions about his son's death and they were able to discuss it in a "matter-of-fact" way. It begins with a picture of Rosen looking happy, with text explaining that he is sad and only pretending to be happy. The book frequently uses a disconnection between text and image to communicate the complex feelings of grief.

The remainder of the book discusses the different feelings that bereavement brings, and ways of coping with them including distracting oneself and expressing feelings through writing. It also describes how Rosen found his despair lifting and how he was able to deal with his grief and think about the good times he had with his son.

== Reception ==
The Guardian noted that the book was indeed sad but highly recommended it, saying, "Sad Book doesn't hide the darkness. It doesn't try to pretend that suffering and sadness are easy to bear. But it does at least show that it's okay to feel bad sometimes." The Daily Telegraph considered whether it was suitable for children, and felt that parents would need to use the book as a stimulus for discussion and have to explain some of its ideas. Publishers Weekly praised it for its candour and said that it "will resonate with – and help – anyone mourning a loss or dealing with an indefinable sadness".

== Adaptations ==
201 Dance Company premiered a multi-media dance and spoken word adaptation of the book at the Edinburgh Fringe Festival in 2022. A UK tour followed in 2025.

In 2023, the book was adapted into an animated short film entitled Sad Film by animation student Finn Woodruff. Rosen provided narration for the film, while Woodruff recreated and animated several of Blake's original illustrations. The film was produced as part of Woodruff's post-graduation work following his honours course in animation at the University of Westminster.
