= Dennis O'Neill case =

1945 British case of child abuse and death

Dennis O'Neill (3 March 1932 – 9 January 1945) was a 12-year-old Welsh boy whose death at the hands of his foster parents led to an inquiry into and overhaul of fostering provisions in Great Britain.

== Circumstances of death ==
Dennis O'Neill, 12, lived in Newport, Monmouthshire. On 30 May 1944, Dennis and his younger brothers, Terence (Terry), 9, and Frederick (Freddie), 7, were committed to the care of Newport County Borough Council by Newport Juvenile Court on the grounds that they were in need of care and attention. On 5 July 1944 the Newport Education Committee, exercising powers under the Children and Young Persons Act 1933, sent Dennis and Terence to live with Reginald Gough, 31, and his wife Esther, 29, at their remote farm, Bank Farm, in the Hope Valley, near Minsterley, Shropshire, England. Frederick was sent to a Mr. and Mrs. Pickering nearby.

At 1:00 pm on 9 January 1945, Esther Gough telephoned the local doctor to tell him that Dennis was having a fit. The doctor arrived at 3:30 pm to find that he was already dead and was in an appalling condition. An inquest found that he had died of cardiac failure after being struck several heavy blows on the chest, and had also been beaten with a stick on the back. He was undernourished, thin and wasted, and well below normal average weight for his age. He had a number of septic ulcers on his feet and his legs were severely chapped.

On 3 February 1945, Reginald Gough was charged with manslaughter and Esther Gough with willful ill-treatment, neglect, and exposure likely to cause suffering and injury. On 12 February 1945 she, too, was charged with manslaughter.

== Committal ==
On 13 February 1945, the Goughs appeared before Pontesbury Magistrates' Court.

=== Terence O'Neill's testimony ===
On the first day of the committal proceedings, Terence testified that they were usually given three slices of bread and butter each per day, and that and tea was their only sustenance. They stole whatever they could from the pantry to supplement this. Dennis would suck milk from the teats of the farm cows. Every night both boys were given a severe thrashing on their hands and/or legs, sometimes up to 100 blows each.

On 6 January 1945, Dennis had been ordered out to collect sticks. He came home shivering with only a handful of sticks and was forced out again by Gough using his stick. He stood in the yard crying and was dragged to the spinney by his hair by Mrs Gough. That night he was thrashed for taking a bite from a swede. The following day he was stripped naked by Gough and thrashed with a stick so hard that it broke; Gough then thrashed him with another stick until his legs were blue and bleeding. The next day he was unable to stand up and when Terence came home from school he found his brother locked in a cubbyhole in the kitchen. His feet were by now in a terrible condition and Gough hit him to try to make him stop crying. Dennis complained that his back hurt. Gough beat him with his fists again the following morning; he died in the afternoon.

On the second day of the committal proceedings Terence gave another three hours of testimony about their mistreatment. The following day he was recalled again and admitted that the boys had sometimes misbehaved and deserved to be punished. Gough had played cricket and football with them and the Goughs insisted the boys said their prayers every night. This time he said that they all ate the same food.

=== Other testimony ===
Miss Eirlys Edwards, a clerk in Newport Education Department (with no training or experience in matters of child welfare), testified on the second day that she visited Bank Farm on 20 December 1944, and observed that the boys were treated with little affection, and while Terence appeared to be well cared for, Dennis appeared ill and frightened; she asked Mrs Gough to call a doctor to examine him, which she said she would do. She had recommended to her superiors that the boys be removed and Mr W. J. Edmonds, Newport's Deputy Director of Education, confirmed that he had requested Shropshire Education Committee to do so, although the Goughs had not yet been informed of this decision.

On the third day, Police Sergeant Macpherson testified that he had visited the farm following Dennis's death and found that the boys' bedroom was dirty and poorly furnished, whereas the Goughs' room was pleasant, neat and tidy. He said that Mrs Gough stated that Dennis had started complaining that his feet hurt soon after he came to live with them and that he was always late getting up. She had stated that the boys had been fighting the night before Dennis's death and it was this that had caused the marks on his body. She and her husband had, she said, hit the boys only very rarely, and then only on the hand for misbehaving.

== Trial ==
The Goughs were both committed for trial at Shrewsbury Assizes and were refused bail. However, on 27 February 1945, Mr Justice Hilbery transferred the case to Stafford Assizes at the request of counsel.

The trial opened at Stafford on 15 March 1945, before Mr Justice Wrottesley. W. H. Cartwright Sharp KC prosecuted, J. F. Bourke represented Mr Gough, and A. J. Long KC represented Mrs Gough.

The court heard that the Goughs' contract required them to bring up Dennis O'Neill as one of their own children in return for £1 per week. The court heard much the same testimony as in the committal hearings. However, it appeared that Terence had initially been somewhat confused about the sequence of events. The prosecution claimed that Dennis was tied to a bench and beaten with a stick for eating a swede the day before he died.

Dr Holloway Davies, the local doctor called by Mrs Gough, testified that when he arrived Dennis had been dead for between four and six hours. That proved that Dennis had already been dead for some time when Mrs Gough called Davies.

On the second day, Reginald Gough gave evidence. He claimed that he and his wife were kind to the boys and fed them very well. The boys were frequently naughty, but were rarely disciplined. He claimed that the incident with the bench occurred, but he was only having a joke, did not actually tie Dennis to the bench, did not beat him, and they were all laughing about it.

Mrs Gough gave evidence on the third day of the trial. She testified that she had married her husband in February 1942, having left the Women's Auxiliary Air Force (WAAF) in June 1941. They had no children of their own. She corroborated some of Terence's testimony about her husband's treatment of Dennis, and said she was afraid of her husband and that she believed that had she originally told the truth to the police she would also be dead. Her husband had told her that Dennis was dead and instructed her to lie to the doctor.

The judge instructed the jury that they could not find Mrs Gough guilty of manslaughter, since only Mr Gough was strong enough to have inflicted the trauma which killed Dennis, but they could still find her guilty of neglect.

On 19 March 1945, Reginald Gough was found guilty of manslaughter and sentenced to six years in prison. Esther Gough was found guilty of neglect and sentenced to six months' imprisonment. The jury deliberated for only twenty minutes.

It transpired that Gough had been convicted of common assault against his wife in 1942 and she had left him in July of that year, applying for a separation order on the grounds of persistent cruelty on 6 August 1942, but had later returned to live with him. The judge said that he took this into account before sentencing her, but her own ill-treatment was no excuse for her neglect of the boys. In March 1945, Gough appealed but this was dismissed by the Court of Appeal in June 1945. Some sources state incorrectly that the manslaughter conviction was overturned and his sentence increased after he was convicted of murder but this is not the case as evidenced by the fact that in June 1951 he pleaded guilty at Salop Assizes to "a serious offence" against a girl of 15 at Western Lullingfield, Shropshire, between 1 September 1950 and 20 March 1951. The girl subsequently gave birth to a child but the judge felt there were "mitigating circumstances" and did no more than fine Gough £25. Gough changed his name to Richard Lockett and in 1955 was charged with sending "postcards bearing grossly offensive words" to another woman.

== Inquiries ==
=== Parliament ===
The case was first raised in the House of Commons on 8 February 1945, by Kenneth Lindsay MP. It was raised on a number of occasions thereafter.

=== Public inquiry ===
Politicians and the public were shocked by the case, especially that Gough had been given custody of the boys although he was known to the police and had a conviction for violence and that no inspection of the boys' welfare was made until they had been with the Goughs for six months. On 22 March 1945, the Home Secretary, Herbert Morrison, announced that a public inquiry would be held into the case. Sir Walter Monckton KC was appointed to conduct the inquiry.

The inquiry opened at Newport Civic Centre on 10 April 1945. It reported on 28 May 1945. The report criticised both councils involved, but did not name any specific individual(s) and acknowledged that the failings were not deliberate.

=== Shropshire inquiry ===
On 26 March 1945 Shropshire County Council began its own inquiry, although this was held in private. It was chaired by Sir Offley Wakeman. The inquiry reported on 30 June 1945, and called for a thorough reorganisation of the boarding-out of children. It accepted all blame placed upon the council by the public inquiry, but did not place any particular blame on any specific individual(s).

== Results ==
On 1 January 1947 new Home Office and Ministry of Health regulations on the boarding-out of children came into force as a direct result of the Monckton Report. The principal requirements were:

- Each local authority was required to appoint a boarding-out committee, at least three of whose members were to be women and which had to meet at least every three months. The committee was to be responsible for finding suitable foster homes and to exercise supervision over all the authority's foster children.
- An official was required to visit every foster child within a month of their being placed and thereafter at least once every six weeks. They were required to submit a written report, taking into account any complaint made by the child.
- A doctor was to be appointed for every foster child and was to examine the child within one month of their being placed and at least once a year thereafter.
- No child was to be fostered or remain fostered by a person with any criminal conviction rendering them unsuitable to be a foster parent or in any environment likely to be detrimental to them.

The case was a significant contributory factor leading to the Curtis Report of 1946 and the Children Act 1948.

In 1947 Agatha Christie wrote a radio play called Three Blind Mice inspired by the case. She subsequently expanded this into the long-running play The Mousetrap.

Terry O'Neill has published a non-fiction book about the case. Called Someone to Love Us, it was released on 4 March 2010, the day after what would have been Dennis's 78th birthday.
