= Harrow County School for Girls =

Former grammar school in Harrow, UK

Information
- School type: Grammar school
- Established: 1914
- Closed: 1975
- Gender: Girls

Harrow County School for Girls, sometimes called Harrow County Grammar School for Girls, was a grammar school located in Lowlands Road in Harrow, now part of Greater London but in Middlesex at the time of construction. It was established in 1914. It closed in 1975 when the London Borough of Harrow adopted a comprehensive system of education. The site was then used by Lowlands Sixth Form College, later becoming Greenhill College and since 1999 Harrow College.

== Architecture ==
The architects of Middlesex County Council favoured a historicist style for schools, and the original building is described in Nikolaus Pevsner's Buildings of England as being in 'minimal Queen Anne style'.

== Facilities ==
In 1972 the New Scientist carried a report on educational reorganisation in Harrow which noted that the school had four laboratories compared to eight at Harrow County School for Boys.

== Former students ==
Notable ex-pupils of the school include:

- Diane Abbott, politician
- Carole Jordan, astrophysicist
- Lucy Oldfield, chemist
