= Karl Britton =

British philosopher (1909–1983)

Karl William Britton (12 October 1909 – 23 July 1983) was a British philosopher. Throughout his entire career, Britton was interested in the philosophy of John Stuart Mill, on whom he published a book in 1953 which was long regarded as the standard student text.

== Life ==
Britton was born in Scarborough, North Yorkshire, one of four children; his older sister was Clare Winnicott and his older brother, James, was a noted academic. He attended Southend High School and, from 1927 to 1932, Clare College, Cambridge, where he gained his MA (Cantab) in history and moral sciences. In 1931 he was President of the Cambridge Union Society. At Cambridge, Britton was amongst those taught by Wittgenstein, about whom he would later publish his reminisces.

His first academic appointment (1932–1934) was as Choate Fellow at Harvard University. Britton then served as lecturer in philosophy at University College, Aberystwyth (1934– 1937). He then taught at University College, Swansea before, in 1951, becoming Professor of Philosophy at King's College, Durham, later the University of Newcastle upon Tyne, where he remained until his retirement in 1975. He died in Riding Mill, Northumberland, in 1983.

== Works ==
=== Books ===
- Communication: A Philosophical Study of Language, 1939
- John Stuart Mill, 1953, 2nd ed. 1970
- Philosophy and the Meaning of Life, 1969.

=== Papers ===
- "The Truth of Religious Propositions", Analysis, Vol. 3, No. 1/2 (Oct., 1935), pp. 21-27.
- "Epistemological Remarks on the Propositional Calculus", Analysis, Vol. 3, No. 4 (Apr., 1936), pp. 57-63.
- "Introduction to the Metaphysics and Theology of C. S. Peirce", Ethics, Vol. 49, No. 4 (Jul., 1939), pp. 435-465.
- "The Description of Logical Properties", Analysis, Vol. 7, No. 2 (Jun., 1940), pp. 40-45.
- "The Language of Controversy", Philosophy, Vol. 16, No. 64 (Oct., 1941), pp. 412-418.
- "Counting, A Philosophical Analysis", The Journal of Philosophy, Vol. 44, No. 12 (Jun. 5, 1947), pp. 309-318.
- "The Nature of Arithmetic: A Reconsideration of Mill's Views", Proceedings of the Aristotelian Society New Series, Vol. 48 (1947 - 1948), pp. 1-12 .
- "What Does a Moral Judgment Commit Me To?", Proceedings of the Aristotelian Society New Series, Vol. 54 (1953 - 1954), pp. 97-114.
- "About J. O. Wisdom's The Unconscious Origin of Berkeley's Philosophy", Revue Internationale de Philosophie, Vol. 8, No. 30 (4) (1954), pp. 470-473.
- "The Paragon of Knowledge", Philosophy, Vol. 29, No. 110 (Jul., 1954), pp. 216-230.
- "Feelings and Their Expression", Philosophy, Vol. 32, No. 121 (Apr., 1957), pp. 97-111.
- "Utilitarianism: The Appeal to a First Principle", Proceedings of the Aristotelian Society New Series, Vol. 60 (1959 - 1960), pp. 141-154.
- "On Knowing the Difference between Right and Wrong", Proceedings of the Aristotelian Society, Supplementary Volumes, Vol. 37 (1963), pp. 1-10.
- "Concepts of Action and Concepts of Approval", Proceedings of the Aristotelian Society New Series, Vol. 73 (1972 - 1973), pp. 105-117.
- "Symbolic Actions and Objects: 'The Weak Pipe and the Little Drum'", Philosophy, Vol. 54, No. 209 (Jul., 1979), pp. 281-291.
