= Physics and Chemistry of Glasses =

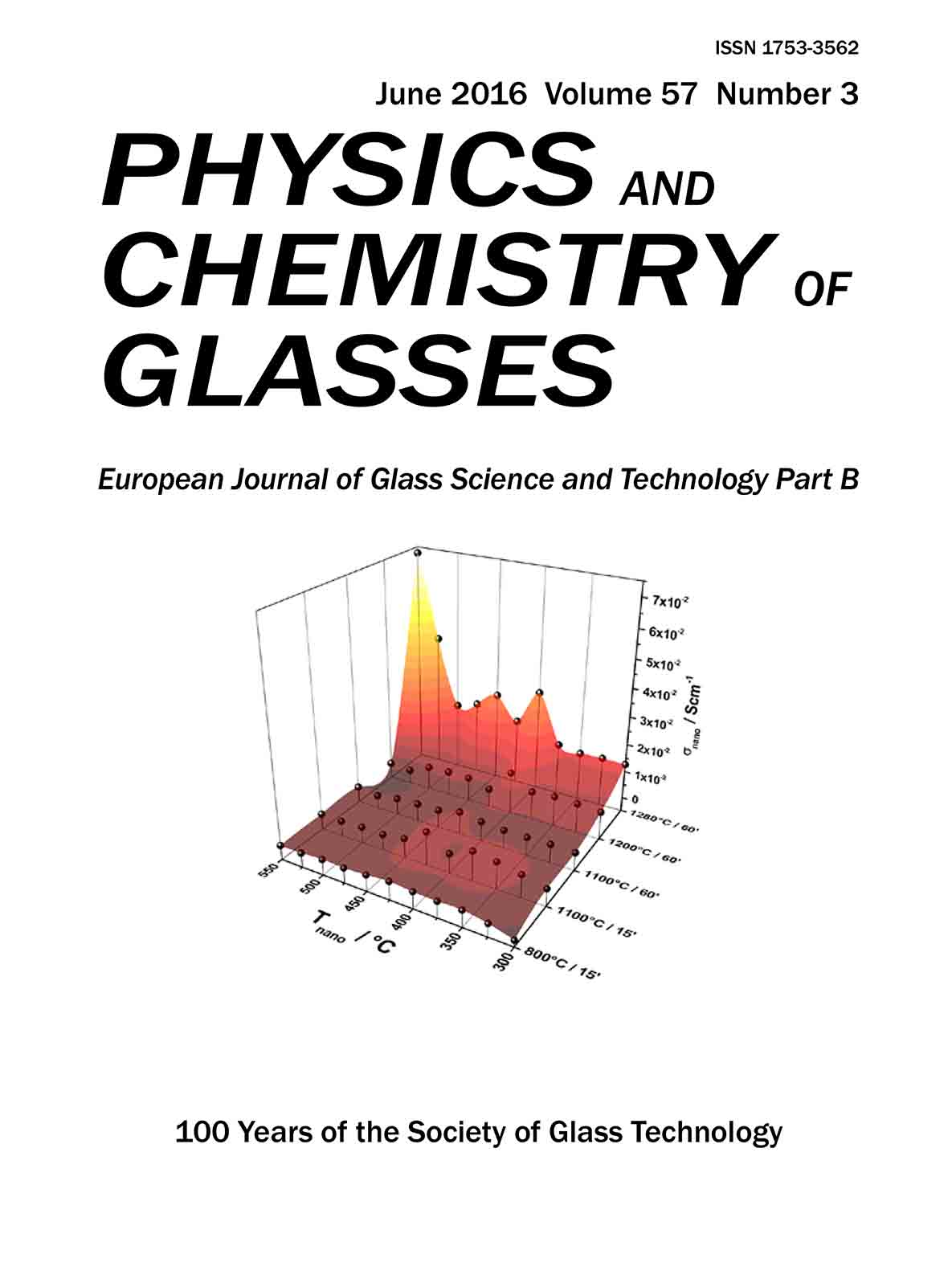
- Discipline: Materials science
- Language: English
- Edited by: R. J. Hand

Publication details
- Former name(s): Physics and Chemistry of Glasses, Glass Science And Technology
- History: 2006–present
- Publisher: Society of Glass Technology
- Frequency: Bimonthly
- Open access: Hybrid
- Impact factor: 0.630 (2015)

Standard abbreviations
- ISO 4: Phys. Chem. Glas.

Indexing
- CODEN: PCGECL
- ISSN: 1753-3562 (print); 1753-3570 (web)
- LCCN: 61038030
- OCLC no.: 475779556

Links
- Journal homepage

Physics and Chemistry of Glasses: European Journal of Glass Science and Technology Part B is a bimonthly peer-reviewed scientific journal published by the Society of Glass Technology. It was established in 2006, from the merger of the Society of Glass Technology's journal Physics and Chemistry of Glasses and the Deutsche Glastechnische Gesellschaft's journal Glass Science and Technology.

== Abstracting and indexing ==
The journal is abstracted and indexed in the Science Citation Index, Current Contents/Physical, Chemical & Earth Sciences, Current Contents/Engineering, Computing & Technology, and Scopus. According to the Journal Citation Reports, the journal has a 2015 impact factor of 0.630.
