= Celia Britton =

British scholar (1946–2024)

Celia Britton FBA
- Born: Celia Margaret Britton; 20 March 1946
- Died: 18 June 2024 (aged 78); Hove, East Sussex, England

Academic background
- Education: New Hall, Cambridge; University of Essex

Academic work
- Discipline: Literary criticism, French
- Sub-discipline: French Caribbean literature; French Caribbean thought; Édouard Glissant; Frantz Fanon; Maryse Condé; Postcolonial theory; Nouveau Roman
- Institutions: King's College London; University of Reading; University of Aberdeen; University College London

Celia Margaret Britton, FBA (20 March 1946 – 18 June 2024) was a British scholar of French Caribbean literature and thought. She was Carnegie Professor of French at the University of Aberdeen from 1991 to 2002 and Professor of French at University College London from 2003 to 2011. She had previously lectured at King's College London and the University of Reading.

== Early life and education ==
Britton was born on 20 March 1946 to James Nimmo Britton and Jessie Muriel Britton. She studied modern and medieval languages at New Hall, Cambridge, graduating with a Bachelor of Arts (BA) degree in 1969; as per tradition, her BA was later promoted to a Master of Arts (MA Cantab) degree. Remaining at New Hall, she studied for a postgraduate diploma in linguistics which she completed in 1970. She then moved to the University of Essex where she undertook postgraduate research in literary stylistics, and she completed her Doctor of Philosophy (PhD) degree in 1973.

== Academic career ==
From 1972 to 1974, while still studying for her doctorate, Britton was a temporary lecturer in French at King's College London. From 1974 to 1991, she was a lecturer in French studies at the University of Reading. Then, from 1991 to 2002, she was Carnegie Professor of French at the University of Aberdeen. Her final position before retirement was a Professor of French at University College London, which she held between 2003 and 2011. In 2011, she retired from full-time academia and was appointed an emeritus professor.

Britton's research focuses on French Caribbean literature and thought. She has published work on Édouard Glissant, a Martinican writer, Frantz Fanon, a Martinique-born philosopher and writer, and Maryse Condé, a Guadeloupean author. Britton has research interests in postcolonial theory, the Nouveau Roman, and ethnography.

From 1996 to 1998, she served as president of the Society for French Studies.

== Personal life ==
Britton died on 18 June 2024 in Hove, East Sussex, England, at the age of 78.

== Honours ==
In 2000, Britton was elected a Fellow of the British Academy (FBA), the United Kingdom's national academy for the humanities and social sciences. In 2003, she was appointed a Chevalier of the Ordre des Palmes Académiques by the French government.

== Selected works ==
- Britton, Celia (1987). Claude Simon: writing the visible. Cambridge: Cambridge University Press. ISBN 978-0521330770.
- Britton, Celia (1992). The Nouveau Roman: Fiction, Theory and Politics. Basingstoke: Macmillan. ISBN 978-0333568132.
- Britton, Celia M. (1999). Edouard Glissant and Postcolonial Theory: Strategies of Language and Resistance. Charlottesville, VA: University Press of Virginia. ISBN 978-0813918488.
- Britton, Celia (2002). Race and the unconscious: Freudianism in French Caribbean thought. Oxford: Legenda. ISBN 978-1900755689.
- Britton, Celia (2008). The sense of community in French Caribbean fiction. Liverpool: Liverpool University Press. ISBN 978-1846311376.
- Britton, Celia (2014). Language and Literary Form in French Caribbean Writing. Liverpool: Liverpool University Press. ISBN 978-1781380369.
