= Uxbridge College =

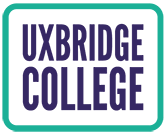

Location
- Park Road; Uxbridge, Greater London, UB8 1NQ; England; 51°32′58″N 0°28′09″W

Information
- Type: Further Education
- Established: 1965 – Uxbridge Technical College; 2017 – constituent college of Harrow College & Uxbridge College; 2023 – constituent college of Harrow, Richmond & Uxbridge Colleges
- Local authority: Hillingdon
- Department for Education URN: 130446 Tables
- Ofsted: Reports
- Chairman of the Governors: Nicholas Davies
- Principal: Dylan McTaggart
- Gender: Mixed
- Age: 16 to no upper age limit
- Enrolment: 7,900.
- Website: http://www.uxbridgecollege.ac.uk/

Uxbridge College is a large general further education college in the London Borough of Hillingdon. In 2017, the college has been merged with Harrow College and in 2023, Richmond upon Thames College became the latest member of the group as they merged to form Harrow, Richmond & Uxbridge College (HRUC), although the colleges retain their individual identities. It has two campuses, in Uxbridge and in Hayes. Harrow College & Uxbridge College (HCUC) jointly had over 7,900 learners as of 2019, the majority of which were on 16-19 study programmes and a majority based at the Uxbridge campus.

== History ==
The college dates back to the founding of Uxbridge Technical College on Park Road, Uxbridge in 1965. This had originally been mooted in the 1930s, and the land reserved at that point. In 1957 the delay in building was raised in Parliament. The college had originally, in 1953, been intended to provide senior levels of qualifications in aeronautical engineering, because it was near Heathrow Airport, but this plan was dropped in 1957. The college was officially opened in 1966 by the then Education Secretary Anthony Crosland.

The campus in Hayes became part of the college in 1987; it had been formerly the site of Townfield Secondary School. The following year, "Technical" was dropped from the college's name.

On 1 August 2017, Uxbridge College merged with Harrow College to form Harrow College & Uxbridge College (HCUC).

On 4 January 2023, Uxbridge College merged with Richmond upon Thames College to form Harrow, Richmond & Uxbridge Colleges (HRUC).

== Facilities ==
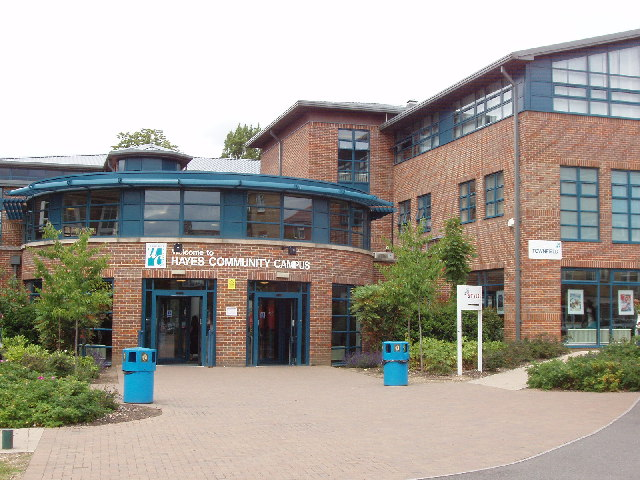
The Hayes Community Campus building off Coldharbour Lane, Hayes

Uxbridge College has spent heavily on its buildings, facilities and IT systems, spending £38 million over the last 12 years. Facilities include the £5 million Mall and teaching centre completed in September 2006, the £6.3 million Technical Institute, its professional-level hair and beauty salons, and training kitchens.

On the Uxbridge campus the Mall offers conference and classroom facilities alongside a coffee and relaxation area. It also houses student and learning support services and includes private offices for confidential meetings.

The Hayes Community Campus offers purpose-built facilities including professional level hair and beauty salons, a theatre for dance and drama performances, rehearsal and recording spaces for musicians, a nursery and a multi-gym.

The London Borough of Hillingdon has refurbished Uxbridge Lido which is now incorporated into a brand new sport and leisure centre with a 50m indoor swimming pool adjacent to Uxbridge College and Hillingdon Athletics Stadium called the Hillingdon Sports and Leisure Complex.

In 2010, Laraine Smith, principal of the college, was appointed an OBE for her services to further education.

In 2011, Uxbridge College launched a new sports department which includes a brand new gymnasium, a £6 million sports hall, lounge area and two new 5-a-side football pitches with third-generation turf and tarmac.

== Performance ==
Following a one-week visit in May 2008, inspectors from the government's education inspection body reported that the college was an 'Outstanding' college. As of 2021, this remains the most recent full inspection of the college by Ofsted. The merged HCUC (Harrow College & Uxbridge College) has had a more recent monitoring visit in June 2019.

== Educational and learning partnerships ==
- University of Greenwich
- Brunel University
- Kingston University
- Bucks New University
- University of West London
- University of Westminster
