= Society of Glass Technology =

British glass manufacturing organisation

Coordinates: 53.47414°N 1.47405°W

The Society of Glass Technology (SGT) is an organisation for individuals and organisations with a professional interest in glass manufacture and usage. The Society is based in the United Kingdom, with its offices in Sheffield, South Yorkshire, England, but it has a worldwide membership.

The objects of the Society "are to encourage and advance the study of the history, art, science, design, manufacture, after treatment, distribution and end use of glass of any and every kind".

The Society was founded by W. E. S. Turner in 1916.

The Society is a founder member of the International Commission on Glass and the European Society of Glass Science and Technology.

== Membership grades ==
- Member individuals interested in the work of the Society
- Fellow "individual members who have met prescribed requirements of education, achievement or service to the Industry and the Society. They may use the designatory letters FSGT".
- Corporate Member Company or organization
- Fellow (Emeritus)The awardee of Fellow Emeritus is a person who subsequent to their election to the Fellowship has rendered to the Society exceptional service.
- Honorary Fellow An Honorary Fellow is a person who, because of reasons of conspicuous service rendered by him to the Society or who, by reasons of noteworthy or distinguished contributions to one or more of the branches of knowledge which comprise glass technology. There are a maximum of 12 Honorary Fellows. To mark the 100th year of the Society in 2016 three additional Centenary Honorary Fellowships were awarded to Dr Richard Hulme, Margaret West and Professor Steve Feller.

== Current Publications ==
The publication of scientific and technical works is a major activity of the Society, and currently it publishes two journals. These were formed in 2006 when the journals of the Society of Glass Technology and the Deutsche Glastechnische Gesellschaft were combined to form the European Journal of Glass Science and Technology.

- Glass Technology: European Journal of Glass Science and Technology Part A (fully peer reviewed plus a news section, 6 issues per year)
- Physics and Chemistry of Glasses: European Journal of Glass Science and Technology Part B (fully peer reviewed, 6 issues per year).
- The Society also publishes books and conference proceedings.

== Former Publications ==
- Journal of the Society of Glass Technology (1917–1959)

From 1960 this was split into two journals:

- Glass Technology (1960–2005)
- Physics and Chemistry of Glasses (1960–2005)

== Awards ==
- Sir Alastair Pilkington Award

The SGT-Sir Alastair Pilkington Award is designed to encourage and recognise excellent work in glass research or innovation achieved by someone who, like Sir Alastair, has come relatively recently into the field of glass studies. This Award is not restricted to hard science or engineering – it spans all dimensions of glass studies, creativity and research; glass art as well as glass science, conservation and museum studies as well as engineering, history and design as well as molecular dynamics.

- Oldfield Award

The Oldfield Award is named for chemist and glass technologist Lucy Oldfield. It is open to UK students and international students. There are cash prizes for 1st 2nd and 3rd. It is presented for research projects carried out by either undergraduate or taught masters students.

- Paul Award

Named after Amalendu Paul (1937–1990), this prize is for the paper presented by a new researcher at the annual conference. PhD candidates can win £250 + free student SGT membership for the year for the best presentation (clarity, technical content) as voted by the Basic Science Committee.
