= Lucy Oldfield =

Chemist and scientific glassblower

Lucy Florence Oldfield
- Born: 18 September 1925; St Pancras, London
- Died: 4 July 1989; Harrow, Middlesex
- Occupation: Chemist

Lucy Florence Oldfield (18 September 1925 – 4 July 1989) was a British chemist and Chairman of the London Section of the Society of Glass Technology. She was awarded a Glass Slipper for her work in glass technology.

== Early life and education ==
Lucy Florence Oldfield was born on 18 September 1925, to Sidney and Florence Oldfield (née Ambrose) in St Pancras, London.

Oldfield was educated at Harrow County School for Girls and then Bedford College, receiving her first Class Honours Degree in Chemistry in 1947. At first Oldfield worked as an analyst for British Drug Houses in London and was eventually accepted as a post graduate research student at Imperial College.

In 1952 Oldfield was awarded a PhD for her research in electrochemistry at Imperial College. In November 1951, Oldfield had completed her practical work and most of her thesis when she joined the GEC Research Laboratories.

== Career ==
It was R.W. Douglas who first engaged Oldfield into the work of glass technology. Her primary interests were in the structure of glass and the relationship between composition, structure and both physical and electrical properties. Oldfield's first job in the glass industry was to try and isolate and identify the defects in the TV tube components being manufactured on a Lynch press at the GEC Lemington Glass Works.

In 1975, Oldfield was named as the inventor of a defect-free production process for laser glass. Laser glass is used to amplify laser light to the higher energies required for scientific experiments.

== Society of Glass Technology ==
In 1958, Oldfield joined the Society of Glass Technology as a personal member later being awarded with the Fellowship in 1965 and in 1967 she was the second person to receive the London Section Redston Award. She served on the Board of Fellows in two different positions over three periods. She was on Council for two periods, 1959 to 1962 and then 1966 to 1969. She was presented as vice president in 1969–1972. She served the committee for twelve years and was chairman of the London section in 1960–1961. Oldfield was both a member of the Basic Science and Technology Committee from its inception, and both the Physical Properties Committee and Chemical Analysis Committee. Additionally, she also represented the Society on BSI committees dealing with standards for street lanterns and electrical lamps. She also served on the Guilds of London Advisory Committee for the glass manufacturing and process industries.

== Death and commemoration ==
Oldfield died on 4 July 1989 in Harrow, Middlesex, aged 63.

The Society of Glass Technology commemorates Dr Oldfield with the annual Oldfield Award, offering three prizes for research projects carried out by either undergraduate or taught masters students.
