= Michael Rosen =

English children's author and poet (born 1946)

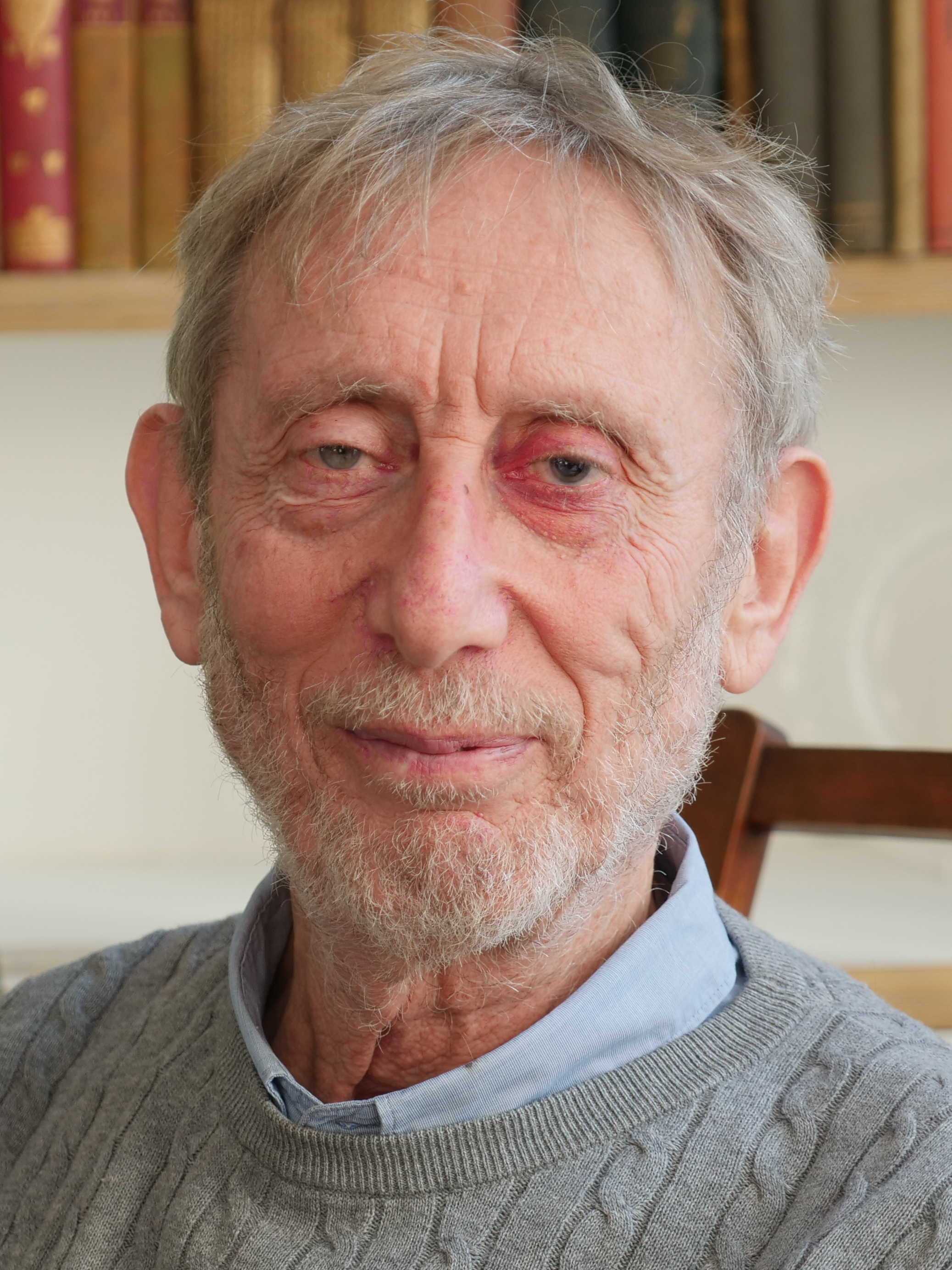
- Rosen in 2022
- Born: Michael Wayne Rosen; 7 May 1946 (age 80); Harrow, Middlesex, England
- Education: Wadham College, Oxford (BA); University of Reading (MA); University of North London (PhD)
- Occupations: Author, broadcaster, poet, activist, academic
- Spouses: Elizabeth Steele (m. 1976; div. 1987) Geraldine Clark (m. 1987; div. 1997): Emma-Louise Williams
- Children: 5 (1 deceased)
- Relatives: Harold Rosen (father) Connie Ruby Rosen née Isakofsky (mother)
- Writing career
- Period: 1974–present
- Genres: Children's literature; Children's poetry
- Notable awards: Children's Laureate 2007–2009; Fred and Anne Jarvis Award 2010; PEN Pinter Prize 2023
- Political party: Respect (2004–2015)
- Website: michaelrosen.co.uk

Michael Wayne Rosen (born 7 May 1946) is an English children's author, poet, presenter, political columnist, broadcaster, activist, and academic, who is a professor of children's literature in the Department of Educational Studies at Goldsmiths, University of London. He has written more than 200 books for children and adults. Select books include We're Going on a Bear Hunt (1989) and Sad Book (2004). He served as Children's Laureate from June 2007 to June 2009. He won the 2023 PEN Pinter Prize, awarded by English PEN, for his "fearless" body of work.

== Early life and education ==
Michael Wayne Rosen was born into a Jewish family in Harrow, Middlesex, on 7 May 1946. His ancestors were Jews from the Pale of Settlement, an area that is now Poland, Romania, and Russia, and his family had connections to The Workers Circle and the Jewish Labour Bund. His middle name was given to him in honour of Wayne C. Booth, a literary critic who was billeted with his father at Shrivenham American University.

Rosen's father, educationalist Harold Rosen (1919–2008), was born in Brockton, Massachusetts, United States, but grew up in the East End of London from the age of two after his mother left his father and returned to her native England. Harold attended Davenant Foundation School and then Regent Street Polytechnic. He was a secondary school teacher before becoming a professor of English at the Institute of Education in London and publishing extensively, especially on the teaching of English to children.

Rosen's mother, Connie Rosen (née Isakofsky, 1920–1976), worked as a secretary at the Daily Worker and later as a primary school teacher and training college lecturer, and programmes for the Home Service, including For Schools Far and Near, The Living Language Series broadcast in 1967, produced by Joan Griffiths; and a series of poetry programmes in 1970. Later in life Connie Rosen wrote articles on education and the book The Language of Primary School Children (Penguin, 1967), with her husband.

Connie Rosen had attended Central Foundation Girls' School, where she made friends such as Bertha Sokoloff. She met Harold in 1935, when both were aged 15, as they were both members of the Young Communist League. They participated in the Battle of Cable Street together. As a young couple, they settled in Pinner, Middlesex. They left the Communist Party in 1957. Rosen never joined, but his parents' activities influenced his childhood.

At the age of 11, Rosen began attending Harrow Weald County Grammar School. He attended state schools in Pinner and Harrow, as well as Watford Grammar School for Boys. He also spent time as an exchange student at Winchester College in 1964, which he recalls fondly. Having discovered Jonathan Miller, he thought, "Wouldn't it be wonderful to know all about science, and know all about art, and be funny and urbane and all that?" His mother was then working for the BBC. Producing a programme featuring poetry, she persuaded him to write for it and used some of his material. He later said, "I went to Middlesex Hospital Medical School, started on the first part of a medical training, jacked it in and went on to do a degree in English at Oxford University. I then worked for the BBC until they chucked me out and I have been a freelance writer, broadcaster, lecturer, performer ever since—that's to say since 1972. Most of my books have been for children, but that's not how I started out. Sometime around the age of twelve and thirteen I began to get a sense that I liked writing, liked trying out different kinds of writing, I tried writing satirical poems about people I knew."

== Career ==
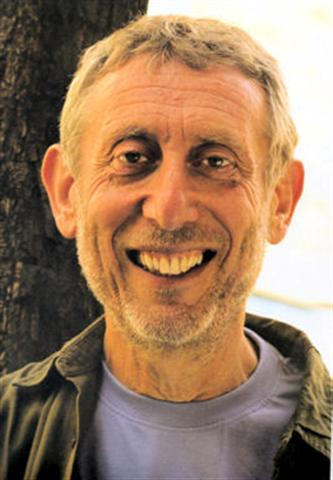
Rosen in 2009

In 1969, Rosen graduated from Wadham College, Oxford, and became a graduate trainee at the BBC. Among the work that he did while there in the 1970s was presenting a series on BBC Schools television called Walrus (write and learn, read, understand, speak). He was also scriptwriter on the children's reading series Sam on Boffs' Island, but Rosen found working for the corporation frustrating: "Their view of 'educational' was narrow. The machine had decided this was the direction to take. Your own creativity was down the spout."

Despite previously having made no secret of his leftist views when he was originally interviewed for a BBC post, he was asked to go freelance in 1972, though in practice he was sacked despite several departments of the BBC wishing to keep employing him. In common with the China expert and journalist Isabel Hilton, among several others at this time, Rosen had failed the vetting procedures that were then in operation. This longstanding practice was only revealed in 1985, and by the time Rosen requested access to his files, they had been destroyed.

In 1974, Mind Your Own Business, his first book of poetry for children, was published. In due course, Rosen established himself with his collections of humorous verse for children, including Wouldn't You Like to Know, You Tell Me and Quick Let's Get Out of Here. Educationalist Morag Styles has described Rosen as "one of the most significant figures in contemporary children's poetry" and one of the first poets "to draw closely on his own childhood experiences and to 'tell it as it was' in the ordinary language children actually use".

Rosen played a key role in opening up children's access to poetry, both through his own writing and with important anthologies such as Culture Shock. He was one of the first poets to make visits to schools throughout the UK and further afield in Australia, Canada and Singapore. His tours continue to enthuse and engage school children about poetry in the present.

We're Going on a Bear Hunt is a children's picture book written by Rosen and illustrated by Helen Oxenbury. The book won the overall Nestlé Smarties Book Prize in 1989, and also won the 0–5 years category. The publisher, Walker Books, celebrated the work's 25th anniversary in 2014 by breaking a Guinness World Record for the Largest Reading Lesson.

In 1993, Rosen gained an MA in Children's Literature from the University of Reading and subsequently gained a PhD from the University of North London. Margaret Meek Spencer supervised his work and continued to support him throughout her life.

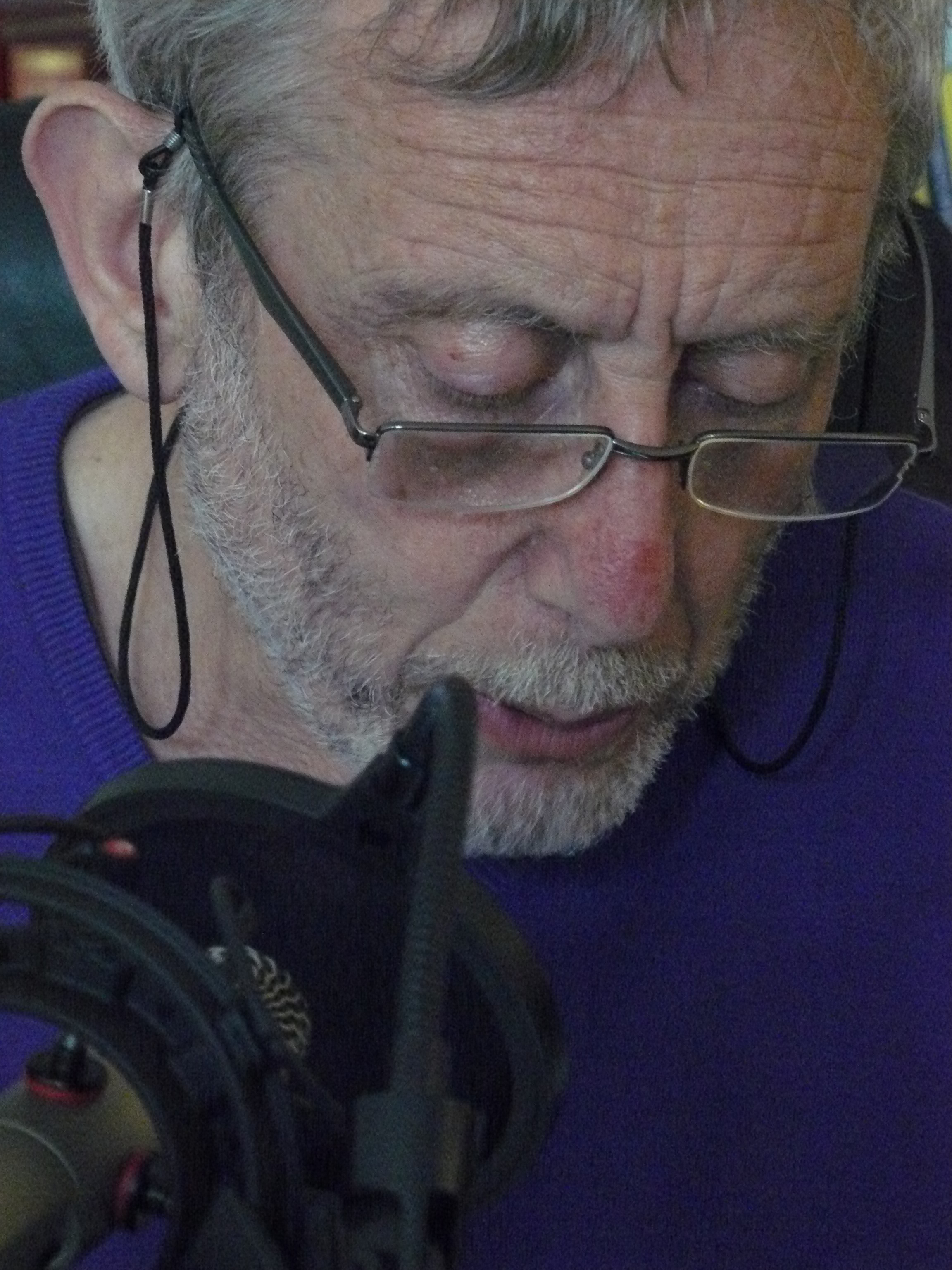
Rosen recording his poem "The Listening Lions" in 2014

Rosen is well established as a broadcaster, presenting a range of documentary features on British radio. He is the presenter of BBC Radio 4's regular magazine programme Word of Mouth, which looks at the English language and the way it is used.

The English Association gave Michael Rosen's Sad Book (2004) an Exceptional Award for the Best Children's Illustrated Books of its year in the 4–11 age range. The book was written by Michael Rosen and illustrated by Quentin Blake. It deals in part with bereavement and followed the publication of Carrying the Elephant: A Memoir of Love and Loss, which was published in November 2002, after the death of his son Eddie in 1999 at aged 18, who features as a child in much of his earlier poetry. Rosen's This Is Not My Nose: A Memoir of Illness and Recovery (2004) is an account of his ten years with undiagnosed hypothyroidism; a course of drugs in 1981 alleviated the condition.

In 2011, he collaborated with his wife, Emma-Louise Williams, to produce the film Under the Cranes, with Rosen providing the original screenplay (a play for voices called Hackney Streets), which Williams took as a basis with which to direct the film. It premiered at the Rio Cinema in Dalston, London, on 30 April 2011, as part of the East End Film Festival.

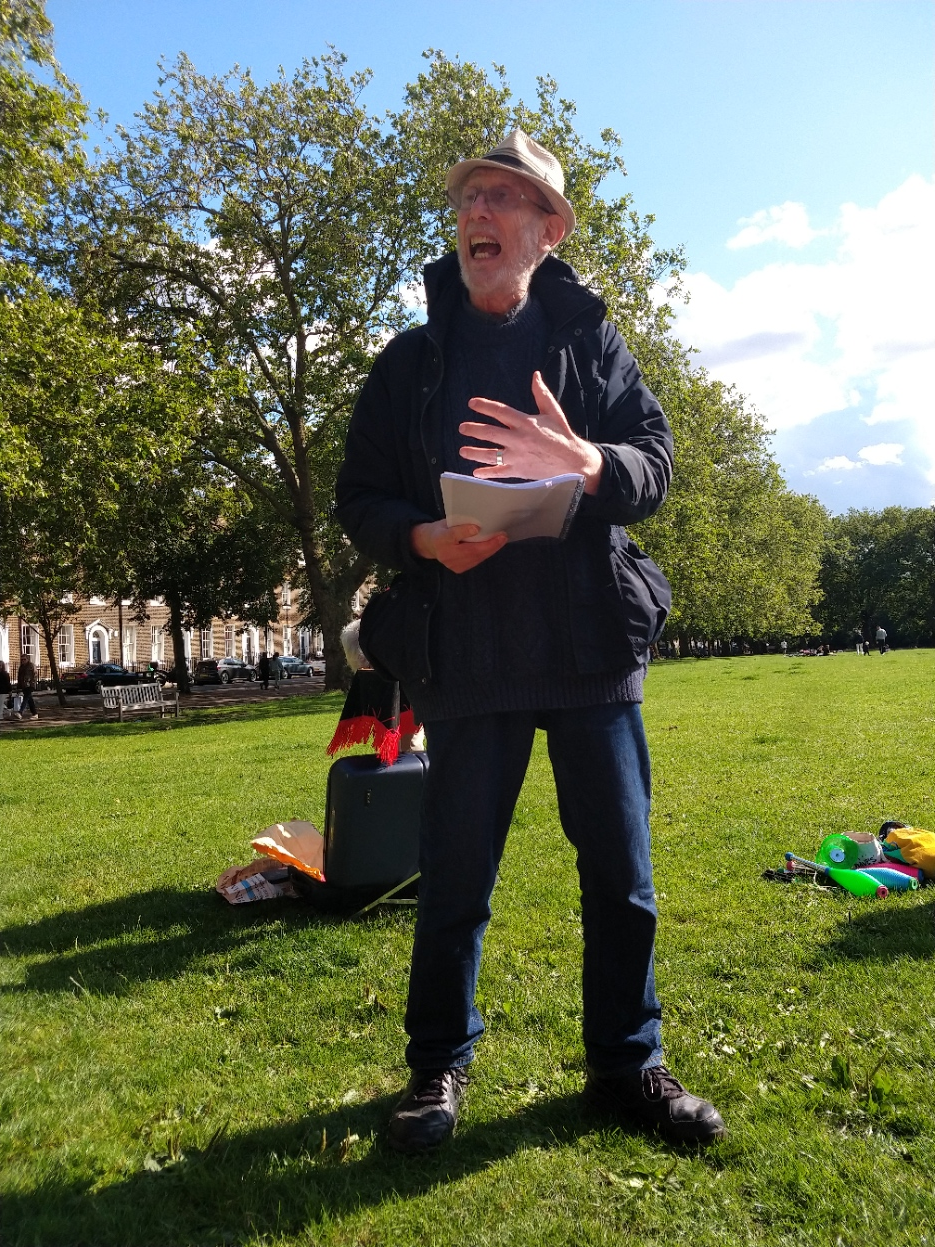
Michael Rosen reciting a poem at a picnic organised by the Jewish Socialists' Group on Highbury Fields, 6 August 2023

Rosen has previously taught children's literature on the MA in education studies at the University of North London and its successor institution, London Metropolitan University. He was formerly a visiting professor of children's literature at Birkbeck, University of London, where he taught children's literature and devised an MA in children's literature, which commenced in October 2010. Since September 2014, he has been at Goldsmiths, University of London, as professor of children's literature in the Department of Educational Studies, teaching an MA in children's literature.

He is also a patron of the Shakespeare Schools Festival, a charity that enables schoolchildren across the UK to perform Shakespeare in professional theatres.

Rosen was the subject of the BBC Radio 4's Desert Island Discs programme on 6 August 2006; his chosen favourite record, book and luxury item were "Black, Brown and White" by Big Bill Broonzy, the Complete Poems of Carl Sandburg, and his deceased son's didgeridoo respectively.

In 2017, Rosen published his memoir So They Call You Pisher! (Verso).

In March 2021, Rosen released the book Many Different Kinds of Love: A Story of Life, Death and the NHS, an account of his experience being hospitalised with COVID-19 a year earlier, including his own poem for the 60th anniversary of the NHS, "These are the Hands", being pinned to his bed or wall.

== Politics ==
=== Education policy ===
Rosen is a long-standing critic of the standardised model of National Curriculum assessment (SATs) and believes English education should focus more on reading. He has accused English SATs of "distorting and wrecking poetry", and described the grammar taught in primary education as "a package of outdated, rigid, misleading, prescriptive, disputed terms".

=== Jeremy Corbyn ===
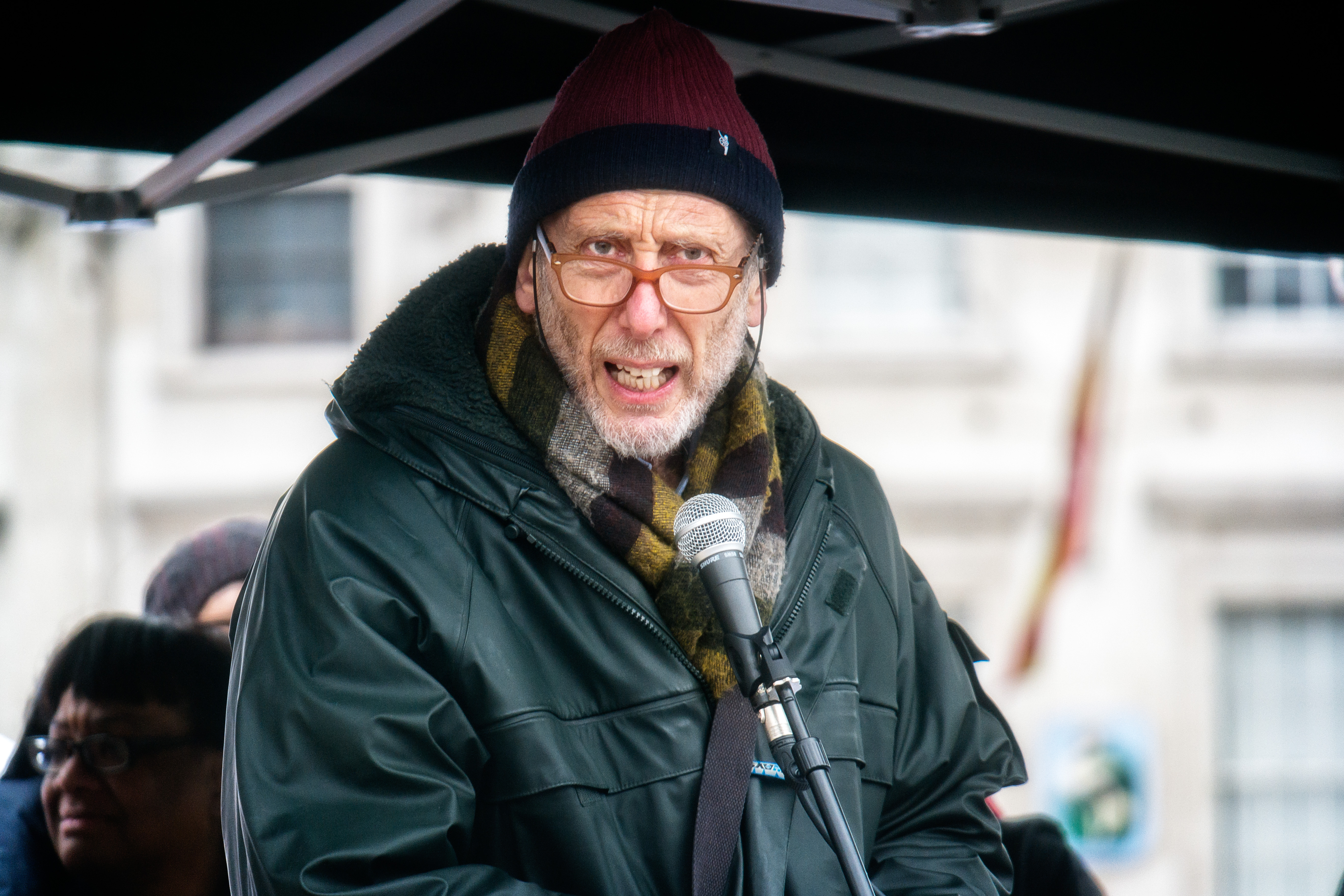
Rosen at an anti-racism rally in London's Trafalgar Square in 2016

In August 2015, Rosen endorsed Jeremy Corbyn's leadership campaign in the Labour Party election. He contributed to Poets for Corbyn, an anthology of poems from 20 writers. In the same month, he was one of many Jewish public figures who signed an open letter criticising The Jewish Chronicle's reporting of Corbyn's association with alleged antisemites. In 2016, along with others, he toured the UK to support Corbyn's bid to become Prime Minister.

In November 2019, along with other Jewish public figures, Rosen signed an open letter supporting Corbyn, describing him as "a beacon of hope in the struggle against emergent far-right nationalism, xenophobia and racism in much of the democratic world" and endorsing him in the 2019 UK general election. In December 2019, along with 42 other leading cultural figures, he signed an open letter endorsing the Labour Party under Corbyn's leadership in the 2019 general election. The letter stated that "Labour's election manifesto under Corbyn's leadership offers a transformative plan that prioritises the needs of people and the planet over private profit and the vested interests of a few".

In May 2021, Pete Newbon posted a photoshopped image of Jeremy Corbyn reading We're Going on a Bear Hunt, replacing the text on the book's page with the antisemitic forgery The Protocols of the Elders of Zion. Rosen claimed the image and its associated tweet as "loathsome and antisemitic". Newbon later commenced a libel action against Rosen, but died before the proceedings completed.

=== Other ===
In August 2010, Rosen contributed to an e-book collection of political poems entitled Emergency Verse – Poetry in Defence of the Welfare State, edited by Alan Morrison.

Rosen stood in the 2004 London Assembly Elections as a Respect Coalition candidate on the additional members list. He is a supporter of the Republic campaign.

He has written columns for the Socialist Worker and spoken at conferences organised by the Socialist Workers Party.

In August 2025, Rosen, along with more than 200 other writers including Zadie Smith and Irvine Welsh, signed a letter calling for an "immediate and complete" boycott of Israel until food, water and aid are given to the people of Gaza.

== Awards and honours ==
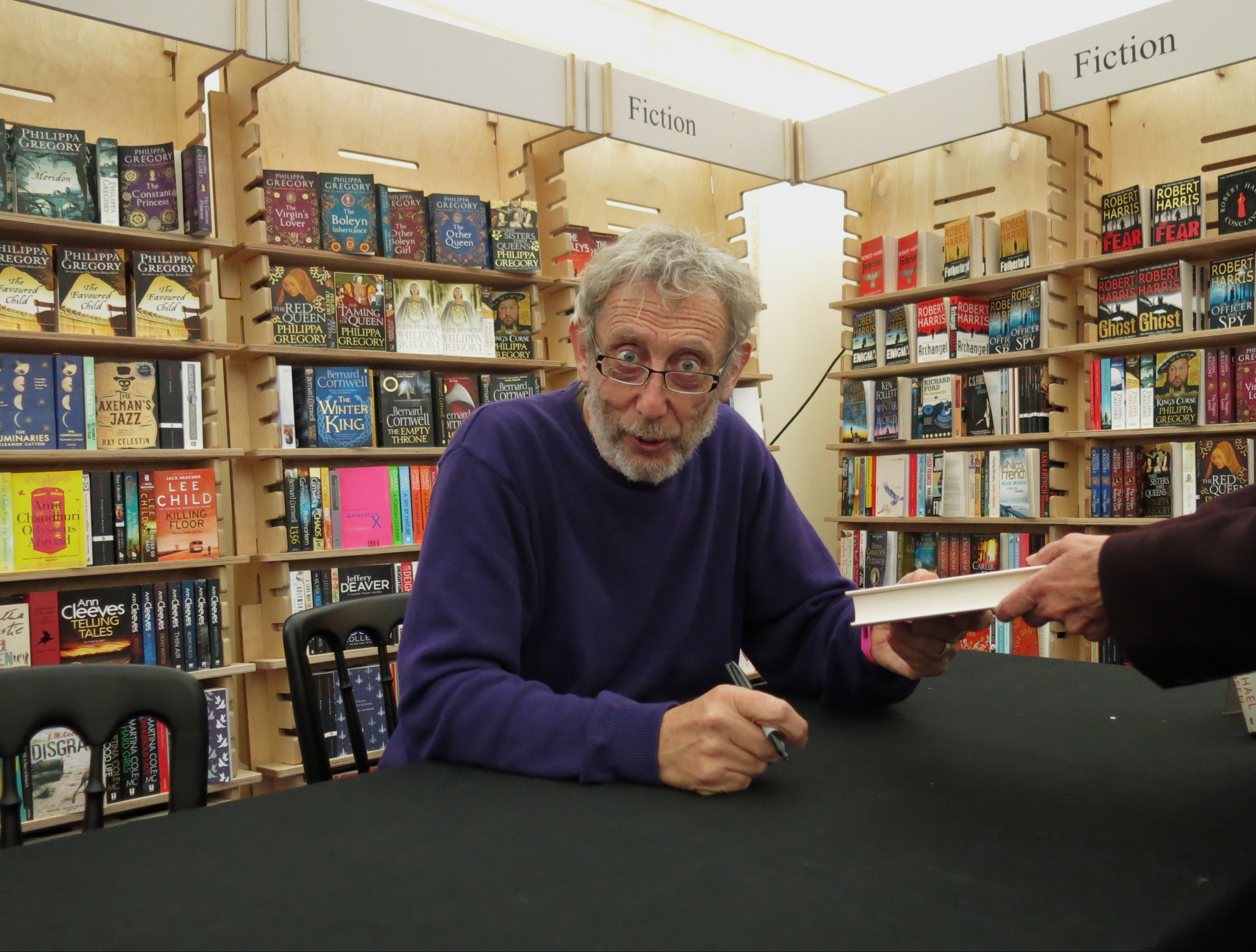
Michael Rosen at the 2017 Cheltenham Literature Festival signing his book The Disappearance of Émile Zola

Rosen was elected a Fellow of the Royal Society of Literature in 2006. He was appointed the sixth British Children's Laureate in June 2007, succeeding Jacqueline Wilson, and held the honour until June 2009, when he was succeeded by Anthony Browne. Rosen signed off from the Laureateship with an article in The Guardian, in which he said, "Sometimes when I sit with children when they have the space to talk and write about things, I have the feeling that I am privileged to be the kind of person who is asked to be part of it". In 2007, he was awarded an honorary doctorate by the University of Exeter.

In January 2008, Rosen was presented with an honorary doctorate by the Tavistock and Portman NHS Trust and the University of East London. In November 2008, he was presented with an honorary master's degree at the University of Worcester and the Chevalier de l'ordre des Arts et des Lettres (Knight of the Order of Arts and Literature) at the French ambassador's residence in London.

In April 2010, Rosen was given the Fred and Anne Jarvis Award from the National Union of Teachers for "campaigning for education". In July 2010, he was awarded an honorary doctorate by Nottingham Trent University.

In April 2011, Rosen was awarded an honorary doctorate at the Institute of Education, University of London, and in July 2011, an honorary doctorate by the University of the West of England. Rosen was selected to be the guest director of the 2013 Brighton Festival.

In 2021, Rosen received the annual J.M. Barrie Lifetime Achievement Award from the charity Action for Children's Arts, "in recognition of his tremendous work championing the arts for children as well as his achievements as a performer and author."

In 2022, Rosen was awarded an honorary fellowship of the Royal College of Nursing by an exceptional and unanimous vote of the RCN Council during the organisation's annual congress; with RCN President Dr Denise Chaffer citing Rosen's lived experience, patient advocacy, and ongoing COVID-19 public awareness work as contributory factors.

In 2023, Rosen was winner of the PEN Pinter Prize, awarded by English PEN to for writers of "outstanding literary merit" who take an "unflinching" look at the world. The judges – Ruth Borthwick (chair), Raymond Antrobus, and Amber Massie-Blomfield – praised Rosen's "ability to address the most serious matters of life in a spirit of joy, humour and hope. Fearless in holding power to account." Announced at the award ceremony on 11 October, Rosen's choice of "international writer of courage" with whom to share the award was Uyghur professor Rahile Dawut.

Wadham College made Rosen an honorary fellow in 2024.

In February of 2026 IBBY International announced Rosen was shorlisted for the Hans Christian Andersen Award. During the Bologna Children's Book Fair it was announced he was the winner of the Author category.

Rosen's book, Oh Dear, Look What I Got!, won the Children's Book of the Year in the non-fiction and illustrated category at the 2026 British Book Awards. It was illustrated by Helen Oxenbury.

== Personal life ==
Rosen has been married three times and has five children and two step-children. His second son Eddie (1980–1999) died at the age of 18 from meningococcal septicaemia, and his death was the inspiration for Rosen's 2004 work Sad Book. Rosen lives in North London with his third wife, Emma-Louise Williams, and their two children.

Rosen performs his poetry for children in videos uploaded to his YouTube channel. His videos have been a subject of YouTube poops (YTPs), typically vulgar video mashups and remixes of existing content. While Rosen has admitted that he does not necessarily mind the vulgarity of these poops, he worries greatly of what children could be exposed to, and what their parents may begin to associate with Rosen's poetry. As such, in May 2012, Rosen issued a warning regarding the YouTube poops on his official website, stating, "Quite a few people have fun taking my videos and making new versions of them, known as 'YouTube poops'. Many of these are not suitable for young children. I am not responsible for either the words or pictures of these." In June 2015, Rosen put a similar warning on his YouTube channel's "about" page. In January 2019, Rosen claimed there were "about 4,000 YTPs" of him performing his poems and stories. He stated, "Some are very funny. [...] I'm fond of the funny ones. I have tried to get the racist, antisemitic ones taken down." In the early morning of 1 April 2020, Mexico's Canal 5 posted on Twitter a distorted version of Rosen's Lunchtime poem, which became a Trending Topic on the site before being deleted at 8 am. In January 2021, a British teacher accidentally sent her primary school aged students an extremely vulgar YouTube poop of Rosen's poem "The Car Trip" entitled "Michael Rosen's Horrible Car Trip" having mistaken it for the original. As of October 2026, Rosen's YouTube channel has amassed 928,000 subscribers and 168 million overall channel views.

In March 2020, during the COVID-19 pandemic, Rosen almost died and was admitted to hospital with suspected COVID-19. He was moved into the ICU and back to a ward, before again being moved back to ICU. He left the ICU after 48 days. He was moved to a ward at Whittington Hospital and returned home in June. In 2021, Rosen reported experiencing symptoms of long COVID, including having lost most of the sight in his left eye and much of the hearing in his left ear, and experienced numbness in his toes.

== Select bibliography ==
- Quick, Let's Get Out of Here (1985) Puffin, illustrated by Quentin Blake
- We're Going on a Bear Hunt (1989) Walker Books, illustrated by Helen Oxenbury ISBN 0689504764
- Carrying the Elephant: A Memoir of Love and Loss (2002) Penguin
- Shakespeare's Romeo and Juliet (2003), illustrated by Jane E. Ray
- Michael Rosen's Sad Book (2004) Candlewick Press, illustrated by Quentin Blake ISBN 9780744598988
- Tiny Little Fly (2010), illustrated by Kevin Waldron
- Fantastic Mr Dahl (2012), illustrated by Quentin Blake
- Uncle Gobb and the Dread Shed (2015), illustrated by Neal Layton
- So They Call You Pisher! (2017)
- The Disappearance of Émile Zola (2017)
- The Missing: The True Story of My Family in World War II (2020) Walker Books
- Many Different Kinds of Love: A Story of Life, Death and the NHS (2021) Ebury Press
- Sticky McStickstick (2021), illustrated by Tony Ross
- Please Write Soon: An Unforgettable Story of Two Cousins in World War II (2022), illustrated by Michael Foreman
- What is a Bong Tree? (2022)
- Getting Better (2023) Ebury Press
- Out Of This World: Poems to make you laugh, smile and think (2024) HarperCollins, illustrated by Ed Vere
- One Day: A True Story of Survival in the Holocaust (2025), illustrated by Benjamin Phillips

Cultural offices
Preceded by Jacqueline Wilson	Children's Laureate of the United Kingdom; 2007–2009	Succeeded by Anthony Browne
