= Michael Eigen =

American psychologist and psychoanalyst

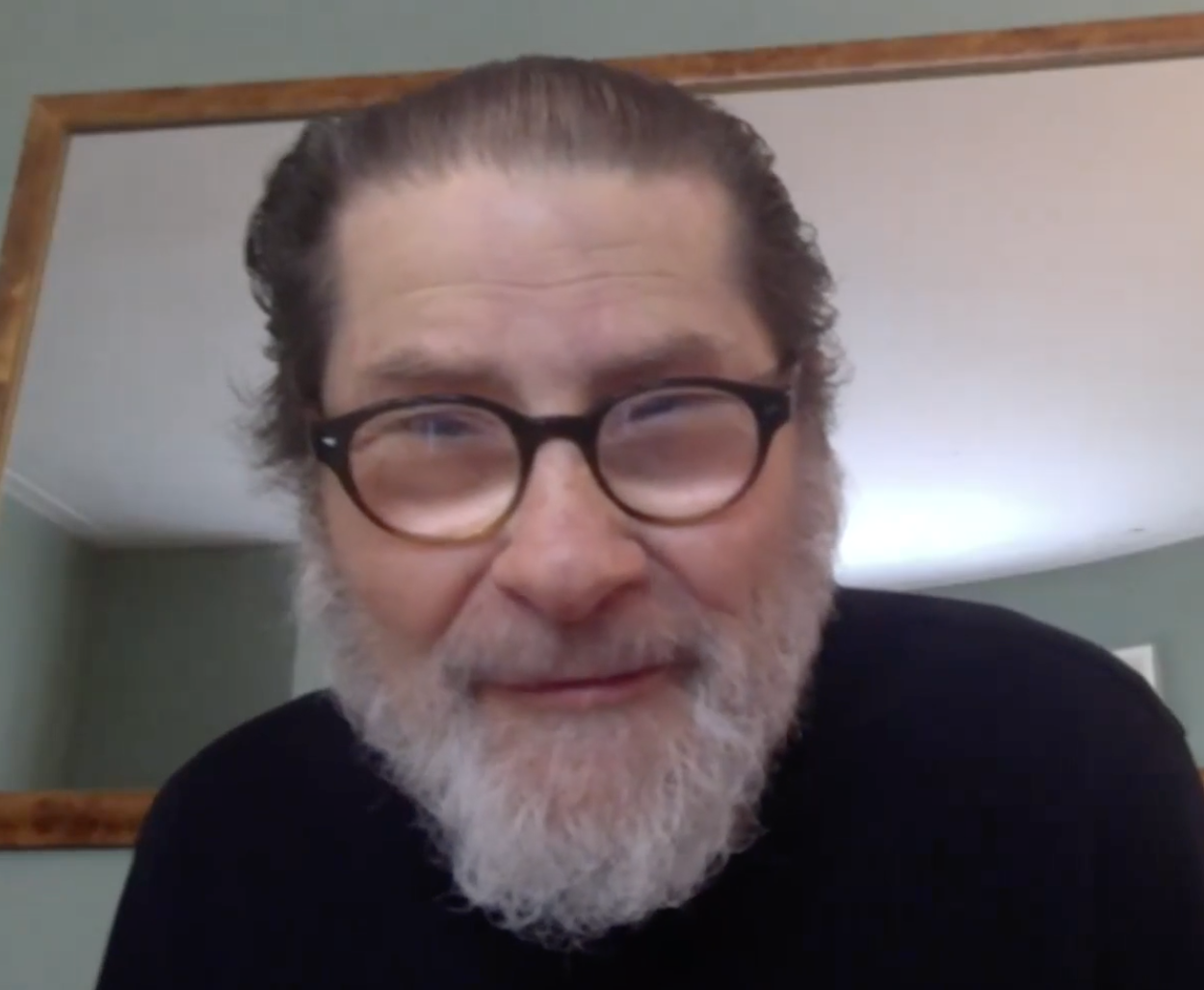
- Born: 11 January 1936; Passaic, New Jersey, United States
- Occupation: Psychoanalyst
- Known for: Mysticism in psychoanalysis
- Spouse: Betty Gitelman
- Children: 2

Michael (Mike) Eigen (born January 11, 1936) is an American psychologist and psychoanalyst. He is the author of 27 books and numerous papers. He has given a private seminar on Donald Winnicott, Wilfred Bion, Jacques Lacan and his own work since the 1970s. Eigen is known for his work with patients "who had been given up on by others", including people who experience psychosis.

== Biography ==
Eigen was born in Passaic, New Jersey, to a Jewish family, the son of Jeanette (née Brody), a teacher, and Sol, a lawyer. Eigen received his B.A. (with honors) in 1957 from the University of Pennsylvania and his PhD in 1974 from The New School. He married Betty Gitelman on December 27, 1980. Betty is also a therapist. Eigen stated that he admires her and says that she “can help and treat people no one else can help.” They have two sons, David and Jacob.

== Therapeutic approach ==
Eigen relates to his patients with humility and curiosity. He learns from his patients. In talking about his approach to therapy, he stated that "I am hoping, praying that something real, useful, something that touches another soul happens, something that helps others feel how much there is to feel, how precious psychic reality is, how precious and complex and amazing we are."

== Mysticism ==
Eigen integrates mysticism and spirituality into his work with psychoanalysis. He draws on the work of a number of analysts and spiritual traditions in this work. He explained that he is "not a scholar, systematic reader, or follower of any school." Eigen is particularly engaged with the work of Wilfred Bion. Eigen described how "Bion uses many images and expressions from religious and mystical life to portray psychoanalytic processes."

== Writings ==
=== Selected articles ===
- "On Breathing and Identity". Journal of Humanistic Psychology, (1977) 17(3), 35–39. 10.1177/002216787701700304
- "The Area of Faith in Winnicott, Lacan, and Bion". International Journal of the Psychoanalytic Association, (1981) 64: 413-33
- "Dream Images". Journal of Religion and Health, (2004) 43(2), 115–122.
- "Beginnings and Endings in Therapy". ISPS-US Newsletter, (2007) 8(2): 8.
- "Incommunicado core and boundless supporting unknown". European Journal of Psychotherapy & Counselling, (2007) 9: 415-22
- "Life kills, aliveness kills". New Therapist, (2012) 76 The Bad Edition.
- "O, Orgasm and Beyond". Psychoanalytic Dialogues, (2015) 25(5), 646–654.
- "Affect Images and States". The Journal of Humanistic Psychology, (2019) 59(5), 714–719.

=== Books ===
- The Psychotic Core (1986)
- The Electrified Tightrope (1993)
- Psychic Deadness (1996)
- The Psychoanalytic Mystic (1998)
- Toxic Nourishment (1999)
- Ecstasy (2001)
- Damaged Bonds (2001)
- Rage (2002)
- The Sensitive Self (2004)
- Emotional Storm (2005)
- Feeling Matters (2006)
- Age of Psychopathy (2006)
- Conversations with Michael Eigen (with Aner Grovin) (2007)
- Flames from the Unconscious (2009)
- Eigen in Seoul: Volume 1: Madness and Murder (2010)
- Eigen in Seoul: Volume 2: Faith and Transformation (2011)
- Contact with the Depths (2011)
- Kabbalah and Psychoanalysis (2012)
- Reshaping the Self: Reflections on Renewal Through Therapy (2013)
- A Felt Sense: More Explorations of Psychoanalysis and Kabbalah (2014)
- The Birth of Experience (2014)
- Faith (2014)
- Image, Sense, Infinities, and Everyday Life (2015)
- Under the Totem: In Search of a Path (2016)
- The Challenge of Being Human (2018)
- Dialogues with Michael Eigen: Psyche Singing, ed.: Loray Daws (2019)
- Eigen in Seoul Volume Three: Pain and Beauty, Terror and Wonder (2021)

== See also ==
- Wilfred Bion
- Jacques Lacan
- Donald Winnicott
- Marion Milner
