= Bullock Report (A Language for Life) =

Front cover of the Bullock Report - A Language for Life (1975)

A Language for Life, better known as the Bullock Report, was a UK government report published in 1975 by an independent committee, chaired by Alan Bullock, set up by the government to consider the teaching of language.

Its primary recommendation was that "every secondary school should develop a policy for language across the curriculum."

The Bullock Report also called for a re-examination of the debate into what English was, how it should be taught, and what needs to be covered. This debate continued for many years, resulting in the Cox Report 1989 and the National Curriculum for English.

While the Bullock Report had a major influence on the thinking of English teachers in the late 1970s and early '80s, it drew some criticism for its undue "optimism" and was gradually moved to the background as the UK placed greater emphasis on education as a practical means to employability.

== Terms of Reference ==
The committee of inquiry was set-up in 1972 by Margaret Thatcher, the then Secretary of State for Education in Ted Heath's Conservative government following the earlier publication of a report by the National Foundation for Educational Research (NFER) entitled "The Trend of Reading Standards". Alan Bullock was appointed the chairman, and the committee was given the following brief:

"To consider in relation to schools:

1. all aspects of teaching the use of English, including reading, writing, and speech;
2. how present practice might be improved and the role that initial and in-service training might play;
3. to what extent arrangements for monitoring the general level of attainment in these skills can be introduced or improved;

and to make recommendations."

== Collections ==
In 1998, the Records of the Committee were transferred to the Institute of Education (University College London) from Bishop Grossteste College.

== Sources ==
- Creighton, W.B. (1977). The Bullock Report: The Coming of the Age of Democracy. Cardiff University.
- Davis, F. R.; Parker, R. P. (1978). Teaching for Literacy: Reflections on the Bullock Report. Ward Lock Pubs.
- Bullock, Alan (1975). A Language for Life (1st ed.). London: Her Majesty's Stationery Office. ISBN 978-0112703266.
