= Harold Rosen (educationalist) =

British educationalist (1919–2008)

- Born: 25 June 1919; Brockton, Massachusetts, US
- Died: 31 July 2008 (aged 89); London, England
- Occupation: Educationalist
- Spouses: Connie Isakofsky (m. 1941; died 1976) Betty Rosen (m. 1978)
- Children: 3, including Michael

Harold Rosen (25 June 1919 – 31 July 2008) was an American-born British educationalist who lived in the UK for most of his life. His particular field was teaching English, and he eventually became an academic at the Institute of Education, part of London University.

In his youth, following the lead of his mother and grandfather, Rosen was a communist activist. After World War II, he became an English teacher and later a teacher trainer. He became a major figure in left-wing thinking in education after leaving the Communist Party in 1957. In the 1960s and 1970s, he played an important part in debates and developments in the fields of language teaching and primary education.

== Biography ==
=== Origins and youth ===
Rosen was born at Brockton, Massachusetts, on 25 June 1919, only son and third child of Morris (Moshe) Rosen, a shoe worker and trade unionist and a Jewish emigrant from Eastern Europe, and his wife, Rose, a disabled garment worker and Communist activist born at Whitechapel in the East End of London. His mother's father, Joseph Hyams, was also a Jewish emigrant from Eastern Europe; he was a "sweatshop worker" in a boys' cap factory and had joined the Social Democratic Federation, Britain's first independent socialist party. When Rosen was two years old, his parents separated, and he was taken to the East End by his mother. He was brought up in a mainly observant Jewish environment but in a strongly secular and Communist home. He recalled: "The whole family were atheists. But my grandfather had a very sophisticated approach to how to relate to the majority of people who were religious. He was very hard on religion but did not make futile gestures to offend religious people." Rosen was educated at the local state elementary and grammar schools.

Rosen took part in the Battle of Cable Street in 1936, defending the East End against a march by the British Union of Fascists.

=== Teacher ===
Rosen studied English at University College London, gaining his degree in 1940. Being an American citizen, he was not subject to UK conscription, and went into teaching, working in a number of schools. In 1945, he was drafted into the US Army and served in the education corps in Germany.

After his discharge, Rosen took his post-graduate certificate of education at the University of London Institute of Education, where he was a keen sportsman in rugby union and track events. He then taught at Harrow Weald Grammar School, in Middlesex. There, he met James Britton and Nancy Martin, who were closely concerned with the development of children's language, and who became his major inspiration and later collaborators. Moving for a shortwhile to Leicestershire, he and his wife Connie made the family home in Pinner. Teaching in Greenford, he found his career stalled by the blacklisting of communists. Throughout this period he was an outspoken critic of British colonial policy.

When the London County Council launched its great initiative in comprehensive education, Rosen moved to Walworth School in south-east London, a pilot comprehensive just off the Old Kent Road. He was Head of English from 1956 to 1958, where he put the teaching of English on fresh basis, moving from merely studying language to using it. This period coincided with his final disenchantment with the CPGB, following the Soviet invasion of Hungary and his disagreements with the Party over structure and organisation. He left the party in 1957, adopting many of the perspectives (without actually joining any particular group) of the New Left, associated with E. P. Thompson, who were strongly interested in problems of class consciousness and working class self-activity, dialectics and praxis.

The theory and practice that were worked out at Walworth are the principal contributions associated with Rosen. Essentially, he demanded that teachers reshape the curriculum to respect the experience and culture brought to the curriculum process by the student. The fundamental part of the learning process is the construction of meaning through language. This is brought about through a dialogue between learners and teachers, and among learners themselves.

However, the socialist humanism of the New Left was complemented by a strong strand of traditional humanism. Rosen was a major proponent of modern literature in education, bringing works by novelists like J. D. Salinger and William Golding into classrooms still largely dominated by the work of earlier centuries.

=== Teacher of teachers ===
Rosen left Walworth to begin a career in teacher education. He worked first in the Borough Road Teacher Training College in Isleworth, Middlesex, and later in the London Institute of Education, where Britton and Martin were highly influential. At first as their collaborator, and later as head of the English department and professor, Rosen became a major influence in teacher training and the teaching of English. Much of his direct influence was exercised through the London Association for the Teaching of English (LATE), which provided a forum for the capital's teachers and teacher trainers.

A major product of this collaborative work was a report Language, the Learner and the School, he wrote with Britton (by this time at Goldsmiths College) and Douglas Barnes of Leeds, and first issued in 1969. While Barnes contributed a penetrating study of actual language use in the classroom, and Britton a paper on the importance of oral language development, Rosen wrote on behalf of LATE, opening up the question of policy. He called for schools to develop a "language policy across the curriculum" that would embed a collaborative and language-focussed model in all subjects and affect every aspect of school life. The Language of Primary School Children (1973) was a collaborative project between Harold and Connie, his wife, under the auspices of the Schools Council. It incorporated research across many local education authorities to present a detailed picture of how language was hammered out in social interactions. This time a special focus was placed on the potential of educational drama. The rise in the number of students from minority ethnic groups brought new challenges, which he welcomed, encouraging teachers to develop new tactics within the general strategy of getting into students' lives and culture. Connie and Harold were strongly influenced in this work by their own critical reading of the sociolinguists Basil Bernstein and William Labov.

These writings played a vital role in stimulating wide debate about the role of language in education and helped force the government to set up an enquiry into the subject. This led to the Bullock Report (A Language for Life) which conceded one of the Rosens' major objectives: "Each school should have an organised policy for language across the curriculum, establishing every teacher's involvement in language and reading development throughout the years of schooling."

=== Later years ===
Rosen remained engaged and interested in every aspect of education and politics to the end of his life. He became a founder member of the Society for Storytelling. His passion for narrative remained compelled him to pass on his own story. Partly this was embodied in his memoir Are You Still Circumcised?: East End Memories. For most of his life, he wrote poetry. A small selection was published in 2003 called Choose Your Frog. He remained a passionate critic of US and UK foreign policy and a supporter of the Palestinian cause. In 2004 and 2005, Rosen was interviewed as part of the Social Change and English, 1945–1965 project, an oral history study of developments in English teaching in post-war secondary schools. Sections of these interviews have now been published.

== Personal life ==
In 1935, Rosen joined the Young Communist League, the youth wing of the Communist Party of Great Britain. There he met Connie Isakofsky; their emotional, political and professional relationship, including their marriage in 1941, lasted until her death from cancer in 1976. They had three sons, Brian (b. 1942), Alan (1944–1945), who died from whooping cough as a baby, and the poet and broadcaster Michael Rosen (b. 1946).

After Connie died in 1976, Rosen married Betty, an English teacher, in 1978. She authored books on narrative and storytelling, and under her influence Harold's later educational writing focused on the nature and role of narrative in the ability to conceptualise and communicate.

Rosen died in 2008 in London at the age of 89.

== Selected publications ==
- Language, the Learner and the School (with Douglas Barnes, Penguin, 1969)
- Language and class: A critical look at the theories of Basil Bernstein (1972)
- The Language of Primary School Children (with Connie Rosen, Penguin, 1973)
- Languages and Dialects of London Schoolchildren: An Investigation (with Tyrrell Burgess, 1980)
- Speaking from memory: a guide to autobiographical acts and practices (1998)
- Are you still circumcised?: East End memories (1999)
