= Tertiary college =

Type of further education college

In England and Wales, a tertiary college is a type of further education (FE) college that offers both academic and vocational courses to both teenagers and adults. Unlike a sixth form college these also have a substantial involvement in the education of adults over 18, therefore tend to have a wide spectrum of curriculum. In its truest form, a "tertiary college" is the sole provider of public post-16 further education in a single local authority; however with the effective halt of new tertiary colleges following the Further and Higher Education Act 1992, the term is nowadays not used by these colleges anymore, referring to themselves as simply the umbrella term of further education colleges.

The first tertiary college was Exeter College, Exeter in 1970. Numerous local authorities implemented the tertiary structure that decade and in the 1980s, including Hampshire, Sheffield, Lancashire, Kirklees, Dudley, Harrow, County Durham, Dorset, Bury, Richmond upon Thames, Knowsley, Sunderland and others. In Wales, tertiary colleges were set up in Gwent and West Glamorgan. The tertiary system reflected the confidence and power at the time of local education authorities (LEA) to plan centrally. Additionally a 1980 paper noted that the tertiary system would encourage more schoolchildren to undertake post-16 study while giving further opportunities in terms of subjects as opposed to secondary schools.

In Derbyshire, the council's approval of tertiary colleges in 1987 caused widespread opposition as it involved closing three schools and removing sixth form provision from ten other schools. However colleges did eventually open in Wilmorton and Mackworth with some of the schools remaining as a compromise.

In 1991 there were 55 tertiary colleges in England across 32 local education authorities. As of 1992 there were 63 tertiary colleges compared to 224 general further education colleges, 116 sixth form colleges, 35 agriculture/horticulture colleges and 13 art and design colleges. Not all colleges necessarily have or had 'Tertiary' in its name - many colleges have since dropped this name from titles even if they are technically still tertiary.

According to a research by Responsive College Unit published in 2003, 16 to 18-year-old students at tertiary colleges had higher achievement rates than other sixth form students as well as FE students at all levels. However other statistics, dating from 1999, point that school sixth forms with 200+ students and sixth form colleges have higher A-level scores.
