= List of Fred and Anne Jarvis Award winners =

National Education Union UK award

The Fred and Anne Jarvis Award
- Awarded for: Contribution to local or national education campaigns
- Presented by: National Education Union (since 2019); National Union of Teachers (2008-2019)
- Established: 2007; 19 years ago
- First award: 2008
- Most recent winner(s): Greg Bottrill (2026)

Named for former National Union of Teachers (NUT) General Secretary Fred Jarvis and his late wife, the Fred and Anne Jarvis Award was established in 2007 and first awarded in 2008. It was originally presented annually by the NUT to individuals outside the union who campaign on education and related issues but in 2017 the award was made to an NUT member. From 2019 the award has been presented by the National Education Union, which has succeeded the NUT. Fred Jarvis died in 2020 but the award continues.

== Winners of the Fred and Anne Jarvis Award ==
Year	Recipient	Awarded for
2008	Margaret Tulloch	A lifetime of education activism including as spokesperson for 16 years for the Campaign for State Education.
2009	Fiona Millar	Campaigning for good quality local comprehensive schools as against academies.
2010	Michael Rosen	Education campaigning.
2011	Robin Alexander	Work on the Cambridge Primary Review, and efforts on behalf of primary education, children and teachers.
2012	Melissa Benn	Championing the cause of comprehensive education.
2013	Malala Yousafzai	Only aged fifteen but since 2008 has spoken out for girls' education in Pakistan. Survived an assassination attempt by a Taliban gunman in 2012.
2014	Michael Lees	A leading campaigner for the removal of asbestos from schools.
2015	Ged Grebby	Chief Executive of the charity Show Racism the Red Card, educating schools, teachers and pupils about combatting racism and providing guidance.
2016	Alan Gibbons	Children's author, and campaigner for the retention of school libraries.
2017	Jonny Crawshaw	NUT member, campaigner for the rights of children in York to receive a good education, and spokesperson for the national organisation Rescue Our Schools.
2018	Warwick Mansell	Education journalism and blogging.
2019	Madeleine Holt	Co-founder of campaign group Rescue Our Schools.
2020	Julie Rayson	Co-founder of an action group which exposed mis-management by a trust at the Whitehaven Academy (award held over until 2021 as Covid prevented the NEU from holding a 2020 annual conference).
2021	Marcus Rashford MBE	Campaigner for free school meals to combat food poverty.
2022	Dr Anne-Marie Imafidon MBE	Campaigner for education to end gender and racial stereotyping.
2023	Onjali Raúf MBE	Children's author, for services to education.
2024	Julia Waters and Hilda Palmer	Waters is a campaigner for the reform of Ofsted; Palmer campaigns for workers' health and safety and was a co-founder of Families Against Corporate Killers.
2025	Kye Gbangbola and Nicole Lawler	Campaigning for awareness of contaminated land and for justice following the death of their son Zane Gbangbola when the family home was poisoned by hydrogen cyanide due to flooding of a field which had previously been used for landfill.
2026	Greg Bottrill	Author and thinker changing perceptions of Early Years education.
