= Teachers' trade unions in the United Kingdom =

Teachers' trades union in the United Kingdom are trades union for teachers in operating in the United Kingdom.

Due to the differing education systems in the UK, most unions only organise in certain parts of the country and some focus on certain members of staff, such as headteachers. Teaching is an unusual profession in that it does not have one leading union, but has many different ones, often with differing aims. Having said that, the NEU and NASUWT jointly represent the vast majority of teachers in England and Wales, while the EIS represents the majority of teachers in Scotland.

For teachers and school staff looking for an alternative to the traditional teaching unions, Edapt provides legal support and advice in England and Wales.

== List of teachers' trade unions ==
The table below lists all the UK's registered teachers' unions in the primary and secondary education sectors (up to age 16), with details of establishment, membership, where they organise and the types of members they accept:

Full name	Short name	Established	Members	England	Northern Ireland	Scotland	Wales	Channel Islands & Isle of Man	Teachers	School leaders	Teaching assistants
Association of Headteachers and Deputes in Scotland	AHDS	1975	1,385			Yes				Yes	
Association of School and College Leaders	ASCL	1977	24,913	Yes	Yes		Yes			Yes	
Community Education section (formerly known as Voice)		2004	43,865	Yes	Yes	Yes	Yes	Yes	Yes	Yes	Yes
Educational Institute of Scotland	EIS	1847	59,371			Yes			Yes	Yes	
Irish National Teachers' Organisation	INTO	1868	6,842		Yes				Yes	Yes	
National Association of Head Teachers	NAHT	1897	27,988	Yes	Yes		Yes	Yes	Yes	Yes	Yes
NASUWT	NASUWT	1976	285,963	Yes	Yes	Yes	Yes	Yes	Yes	Yes	Yes
National Education Union: Association of Teachers and Lecturers section	NEU/ATL	2017 (1978 as ATL)	160,000	Yes	Yes	Yes	Yes	Yes	Yes	Yes	Yes
National Education Union: National Union of Teachers section	NEU/NUT	2017 (1870 as NUT)	497,400	Yes			Yes	Yes	Yes	Yes	
School Leaders Scotland	SLS	1936	Part of the ASCL			Yes				Secondary only	
Scottish Primary Teachers' Association	SPTA	2011	Did not exist			Yes			Primary only	Primary only	
Scottish Secondary Teachers' Association	SSTA	1944	6,609			Yes			Secondary only	Secondary only	
Ulster Teachers' Union	UTU	1919	6,429		Yes				Yes	Yes	
Undeb Cenedlaethol Athrawon Cymru	UCAC	1940	3,879				Yes		Yes	Yes	

== See also ==
- UK labour law
- List of trade unions in the United Kingdom
