= Tolworth Girls' School =

Tolworth Girls' School & Sixth Form
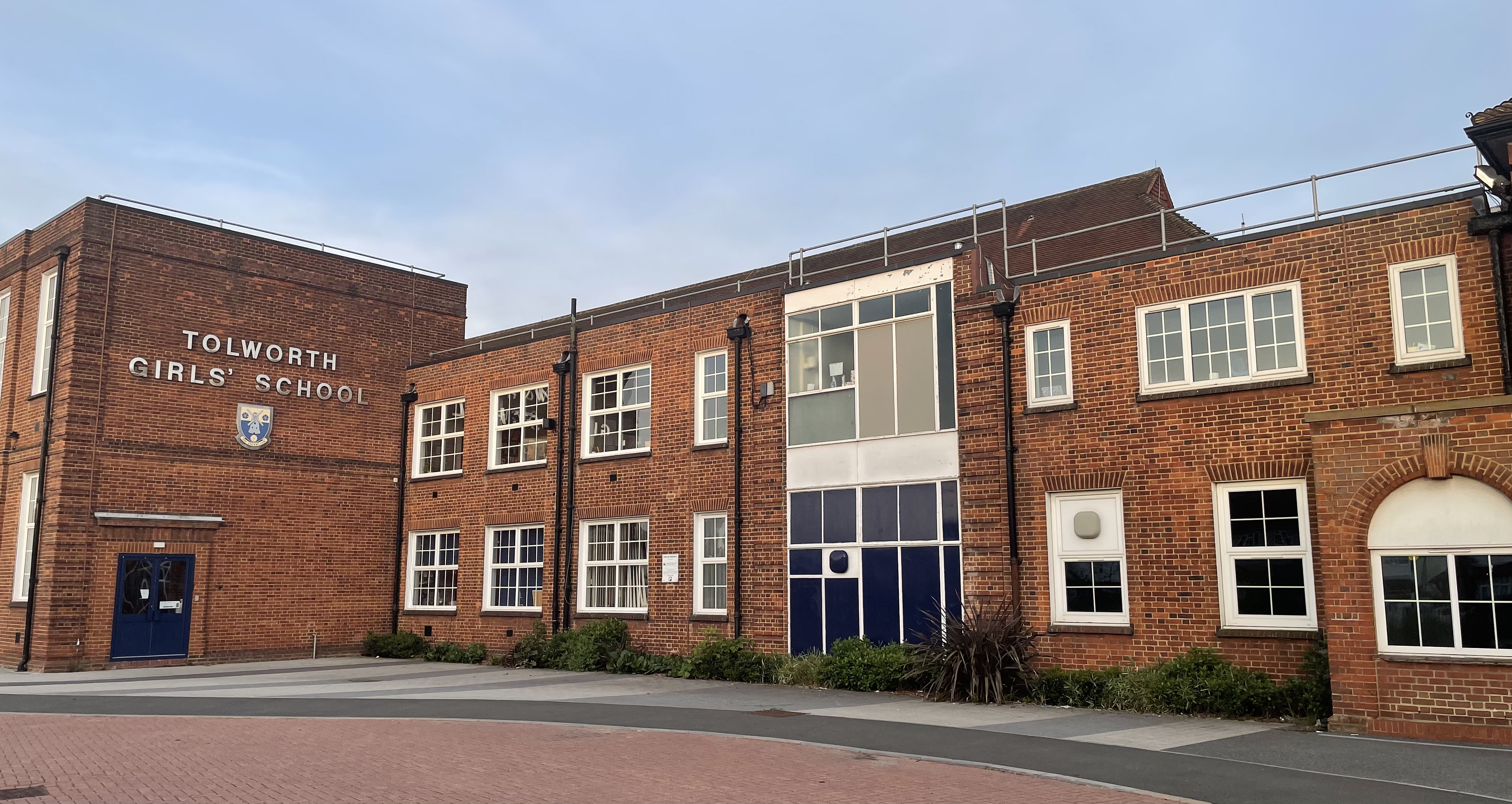
- The school in June 2021

Location
- Tala Close; Surbiton, Greater London (former Surrey), KT6 7EY; England; 51°22′32″N 0°17′47″W

Information
- Type: Academy
- Motto: Sic Luceat Lux (Let your light so shine)
- Established: 1932
- Department for Education URN: 137060 Tables
- Ofsted: Reports
- Head teacher: Jolande Botha-Smith
- Gender: Girls
- Age: 11 to 20
- Enrolment: 1,529
- Houses: Amethyst, Emerald, Garnet, Jade, Opal, Pearl, Sapphire, Topaz
- Colours: Navy Blue and Yellow
- Website: tolworthgirlsschool.co.uk

Tolworth Girls' School is a secondary school and sixth form for girls aged 11–18 in Surbiton, London, England, in the Royal Borough of Kingston Upon Thames.

In 2023 the school had 1,120 girls on roll plus 310 students in the mixed sixth form. The school has received awards including a specialism in Technology, Leading Edge School, Training School and the Artsmark Gold award.

In 2007, 2017 and 2023, it was rated 1-outstanding, by Ofsted. Its link school is Southborough High School, another local school. In August 2011 the school converted to academy status.

It is directly next to the north side of the A3 Kingston Bypass, near the Red Lion Business Park, not far from the A243 junction (Hook underpass), between Tolworth and Hook.

== The Prime Minister's Global Fellowship ==
Students attained places on the Prime Minister's Global Fellowship programme every year from 2008 to 2010. The programme, which closed in 2011, aimed to offer 18- and 19-year-old students from England experience in one of three major emerging economies.

== Notable former pupils ==
- India de Beaufort, actress
- Christine Blower, general secretary of the National Union of Teachers
- Karina Bryant, British judoka, Olympic medal winner in 2012
- Saskia Howard-Clarke, Big Brother 6 (UK) contestant and glamour model
- Rosalyn Landor, actress
- Debbie McGee, magician Paul Daniels’s wife and assistant, dancer and presenter
- Kelly Reilly, actress
- Kim Tiddy, actress
