= Kevin Courtney =

British Trade Union leader

Joint General Secretary of the National Education Union
- In office 1 September 2017 – 31 August 2023 Co-leading with Mary Bousted
- Preceded by: Position established
- Succeeded by: Daniel Kebede

General Secretary of the National Union of Teachers
- In office May 2010 – 1 September 2017
- Preceded by: Christine Blower
- Succeeded by: Union merged with the ATL

Deputy General Secretary of the National Union of Teachers
- In office 2010 – 2016
- Preceded by: Christine Blower
- Succeeded by: "Post vacant"

Personal details
- Born: 16 August 1959 (age 66) Pontypridd, Glamorgan, Wales
- Spouse: Polly Donnison (m. 1989)
- Children: 2
- Education: Trefforest Primary School; Coedylan Comprehensive
- Alma mater: Imperial College London; Chelsea College of Science and Technology
- Occupation: Union leader, former teacher

Kevin Courtney (born 16 August 1959) is a Welsh former school teacher, and the former joint (along with Mary Bousted) General Secretary of the National Education Union, the largest teachers' trade union for England and Wales.

== Early life ==
He was born in Pontypridd, now in Rhondda Cynon Taf, earlier part of Mid Glamorgan, and Glamorgan before 1974. His mother was a cleaner at Glamorgan Polytechnic in Pontypridd, which became the Polytechnic of Wales in 1975, and the University of Glamorgan in 1992. He went to Trefforest Primary School and Coedylan Comprehensive, now called Pontypridd High School.

From 1977-80 he studied Physics at Imperial College London. In 1982 he completed a PGCE at the Chelsea College of Science and Technology.

== Career ==
After graduating, Courtney worked as a physics teacher. While teaching physics at Camden School for Girls, a comprehensive school, he joined Camden National Union of Teachers. In 1998 he founded the NUT's School Teachers Opposed to Performance Pay (STOPP) campaign, to argue against performance-related pay. From 1990–2010 he was the secretary of Camden NUT. He became a member of the NUT's national executive in 2006.

He became deputy General Secretary of the NUT in 2010. He became acting-leader of the NUT in May 2016 when Christine Blower stepped down as general secretary. He has been on the board of the Teaching Awards.

On 15 July 2016, he became the General Secretary of the NUT, in a vote where he received 70% support.

In 2017, the NUT merged with the Association of Teachers and Lecturers (ATL) to form the National Education Union (NEU). Since then, Courtney has served as joint General Secretary of the NEU alongside Mary Bousted, who was General Secretary of the ATL.

Courtney also served until August 2023 on the General Council and Executive Committee of the Trades Union Congress, where since 2019 he (jointly alongside Mary Bousted) was lead member on issues of digital change.

== Politics as a union leader ==
Courtney has said he wants to have National Curriculum assessments tests abolished.

He has worked with the Anti Academies Alliance, a pressure group opposing the transfer of the operation of schools in England from the public sector to private-sector organisations.

He has appeared at the 21st century Marxism conference, where he spoke on "Can the Labour movement defeat the ConDems?"

Courtney is critical of funding cuts to education which he feels lead to larger classes and less well qualified people teaching children. Courtney said, "Whoever caused this economic crisis, it wasn't our five-year-olds in schools now," Courtney also fears many teachers could leave the profession. Courtney said, “If the government does not act decisively and soon, the recruitment and retention crisis will seriously damage our children and young people’s education.” Courtney also stated, “Our own research shows that 81% of teachers have considered leaving the profession in the last year because of workload, driven in a large part by time-consuming data gathering that has little or nothing to do with children’s education. Real-terms pay cuts have put teaching far behind other graduate professions and, in London and other hotspots around the country, very high rents have also contributed to the problem. It is no surprise that, faced with this, teachers leave the profession.”

In June 2021, Courtney was asked his views on the vaccination of children to protect against Covid-19. He told the Daily Telegraph, "If JCVI look at the ethical questions and if they think on the ethical balance – and the MHRA say there is a high degree of safety – then in an ideal world we think it would be better if kids were vaccinated and had three weeks immunity before they come back to school in September." He recognised there were "ethical questions" because children "don't by and large get seriously ill", adding: "So if there is a risk from the vaccine, even if it is an incredibly small risk, an ethical question is raised about whether you give them something with a risk." When the JCVI declined to back mass vaccinations for 12-15 year olds in September 2021, he said “this makes additional safety mitigations in schools all the more important.”

== Personal life ==
He lives in Stoke Newington, in the London Borough of Hackney. He married Polly Donnison in July 1989 in north-east London. They have a son (born November 1989) and a daughter (born November 1993).

Trade union offices
| Preceded by Christine Blower | Deputy General Secretary of the National Union of Teachers; 2010–2016 | Succeeded by Post vacant |
| Preceded by Christine Blower | General Secretary of the National Union of Teachers; 2016–2017 | Succeeded by Union merged with the ATL |
| Preceded by New position | General Secretary of the National Education Union; 2017–2023; With: Mary Bousted | Succeeded by Daniel Kebede |
