= Antipathy =

Dislike of something or somebody

Antipathy is a dislike for something or somebody, the opposite of sympathy. While antipathy may be induced by experience, it sometimes exists without a rational cause-and-effect explanation being present to the individuals involved.

Thus, the origin of antipathy has been subject to various philosophical and psychological explanations, which some people find convincing and others regard as highly speculative. The exploration of a philosophical aspect for antipathy has been found in an essay by John Locke, an early modern 17th century philosopher.

== Interpersonal antipathy ==
Interpersonal antipathy is often irrationally ascribed to mannerisms or certain physical characteristics, which are perceived as signs for character traits (e.g., close, deep set eyes as a sign for dullness or cruelty). Further, the negative feeling sometimes takes place rapidly and without reasoning, functioning below the level of attention, thus resembling an automatic process.

Chester Alexander’s empirical findings suggest that an important characteristic of antipathies is that they are "marginal to reflective consciousness". Alexander based this conclusion on the fact that many of the subjects of the study reported to have never thought much about their antipathies, have not tried to analyze them or discuss them with others.

Sympathy and antipathy modify social behavior. Although it is generally assumed that antipathy causes avoidance, some empirical studies gathered evidence that an antipathetic reaction to objects was not followed by any effort to avoid future encounters.

=== Personality psychology ===
In personality psychology, antipathy may be related to low agreeableness.

=== Pseudo-antipathy ===
Sophie Bryant observed the occurrence of pseudo-antipathy which consists in "the careless and arbitrary interpretation of another person's acts and expressions in accordance with the worst side of one's self". In other words, people tend to project their own faults onto others and dislike or hate them. Pseudo-antipathy is based on the (implicit) knowledge about the negative sides of a person's own character. Bryant compares the resulting feeling with "a certain wrong-headed sense of cleansing".
