= Daniel Kebede =

British trade unionist

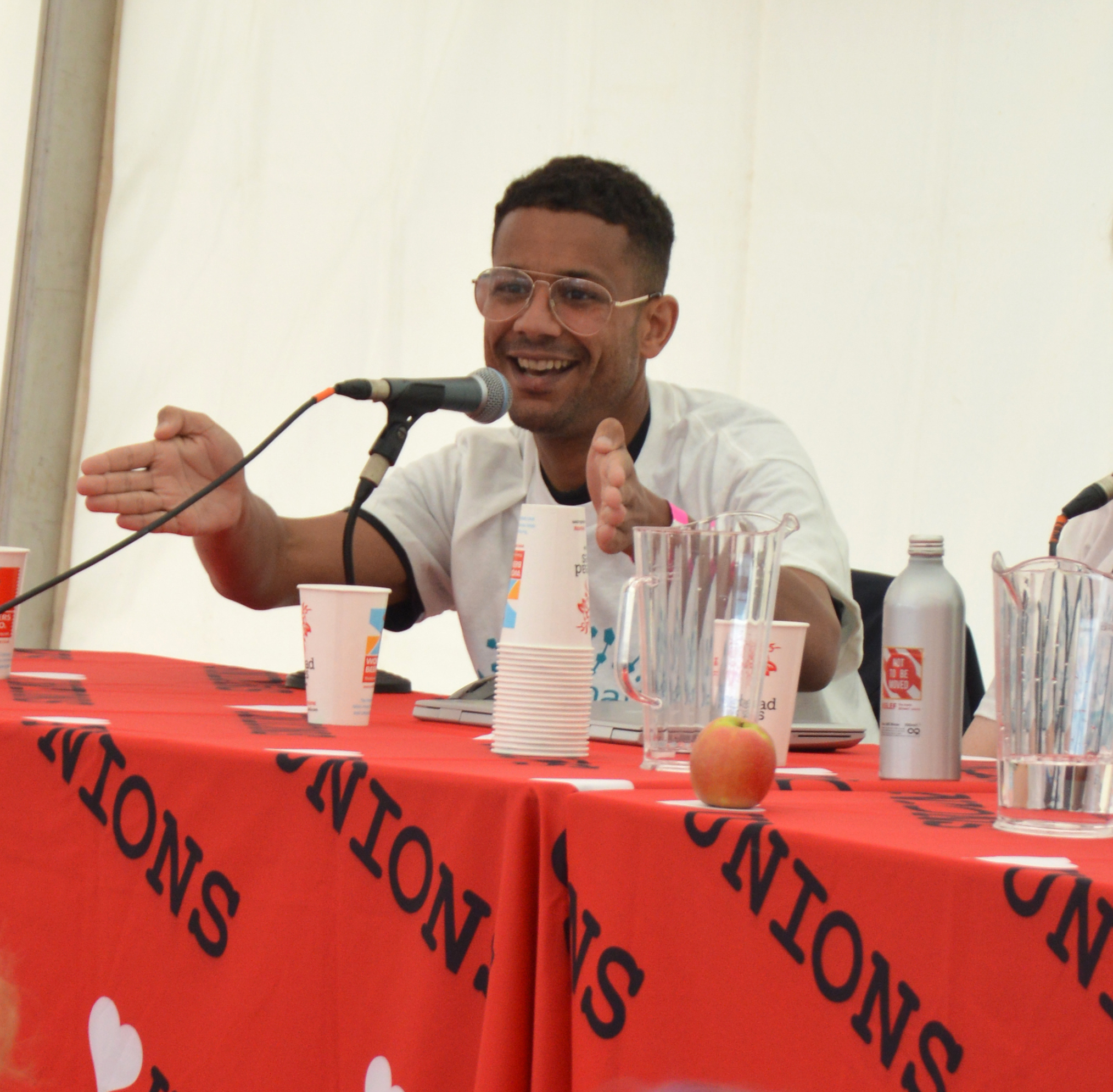
Daniel Kebede in a panel discussion at Tolpuddle Martyrs' Festival in 2024

Daniel Mesfin Kebede (born 1987) is a British trade union leader.

Kebede studied law at the University of Wales before becoming a schoolteacher. He taught in early years, primary and secondary schools, and became active in the National Union of Teachers (NUT). In 2017, he won the union's Blair Peach Award for his contributions to social justice. The NUT later became part of the National Education Union (NEU), and in 2019, Kebede was elected to its executive committee. In 2021, he was elected as the union's president.

Kebede stood to become general secretary of the NEU in 2023 and won, defeating deputy general secretary Niamh Sweeney by 28,636 votes to 12,918. He listed his priorities as ending real term pay cuts, the overwork of staff, and the Ofsted inspection regime, and securing real term increases to school funding. On his election, The Voice described Kebede as "only the fourth Black General Secretary of a union in Britain".

== Personal life ==
Kebede was in a relationship with former Labour MP Laura Pidcock with whom he has a son, born in July 2018.

He has dyslexia.

Trade union offices
Preceded by Robin Bevan	President of the National Education Union; 2021–2022	Succeeded by Louise Atkinson
Preceded by Mary Bousted; Kevin Courtney	General Secretary of the National Education Union; 2023–present	Incumbent
