= Mary Bousted =

British trade unionist (born 1959)

The Right Honourable The Baroness Bousted
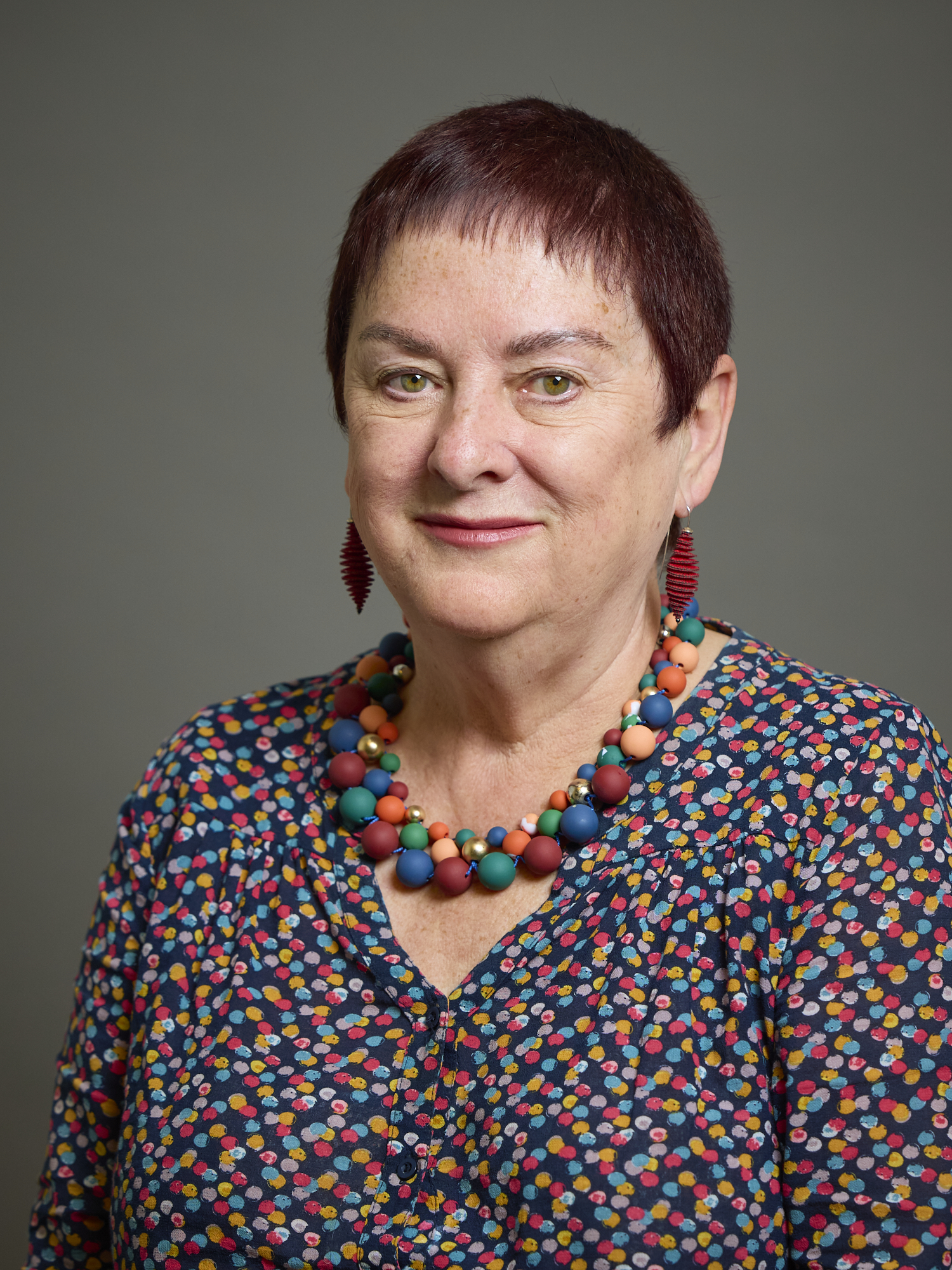
- Official portrait, 2025

General Secretary of the National Education Union
- In office 1 September 2017 – 31 August 2023 Serving with Kevin Courtney
- Preceded by: Position established
- Succeeded by: Daniel Kebede

President of the Trades Union Congress
- In office 14 September 2016 – 13 September 2017
- Preceded by: Liz Snape
- Succeeded by: Sally Hunt

General Secretary of the Association of Teachers and Lecturers
- In office 7 April 2003 – 1 September 2017
- Preceded by: Peter Smith
- Succeeded by: Position abolished

Member of the House of Lords
- Lord Temporal
- Life peerage 27 January 2025

Personal details
- Born: Mary Winefride Bleasdale; 15 September 1959 (age 67) Bolton, England
- Party: Labour
- Spouse: Donald Bousted (m. 1983)
- Children: 1

Academic background
- Education: University of Hull (BA); Collingwood College, Durham (PGCE); UCL Institute of Education (MA); University of York (PhD)
- Thesis: A Socio-Political Analysis of the Personal Growth Ideology of English Teaching (1999)

Academic work
- Institutions: University of York; Edge Hill College; Kingston University

Mary Winefride Bousted, Baroness Bousted (née Bleasdale; born 15 September 1959), is a British trade unionist, educator and life peer. She was the joint general secretary of the National Education Union (NEU) from 2017 to 2023 and previously the general secretary of the Association of Teachers and Lecturers (ATL) from 2003 to 2017.

Born to teachers in Bolton, Bousted worked as an English teacher in London. After moving into higher education, she ran teacher-training programmes at various universities. She became the general secretary of the ATL in 2003 and, after its amalgamation with the National Union of Teachers to form the NEU, subsequently served as the joint general secretary of the NEU alongside Kevin Courtney. She served as the president of the Trades Union Congress for 2016–17. Bousted was appointed to the House of Lords as a Labour Party life peer in 2025.

== Early life ==
Bousted was born Mary Winefride Bleasdale on 15 September 1959 in Bolton to Edward and Winefride Bleasdale. She was the second-youngest of eight children. Her mother was a teacher, and supported the Labour Party. Her father supported the Liberals, and was determined for those at the primary school to pass the eleven-plus. Bousted attended St Osmund's RC Primary School in Breightmet, where her father was the headmaster. She then attended Mount St Joseph School, a Roman Catholic girls' direct grant grammar school.

Bousted gained a Bachelor of Arts (BA) degree in English from the University of Hull, followed by a Postgraduate Certificate in Education (PGCE) from Durham University (Collingwood College) in 1982. She later gained a Master of Arts (MA) degree from the UCL Institute of Education, and a PhD from the University of York in 1999 with a thesis on "a socio-political analysis of the personal growth ideology of English teaching".

== Career ==
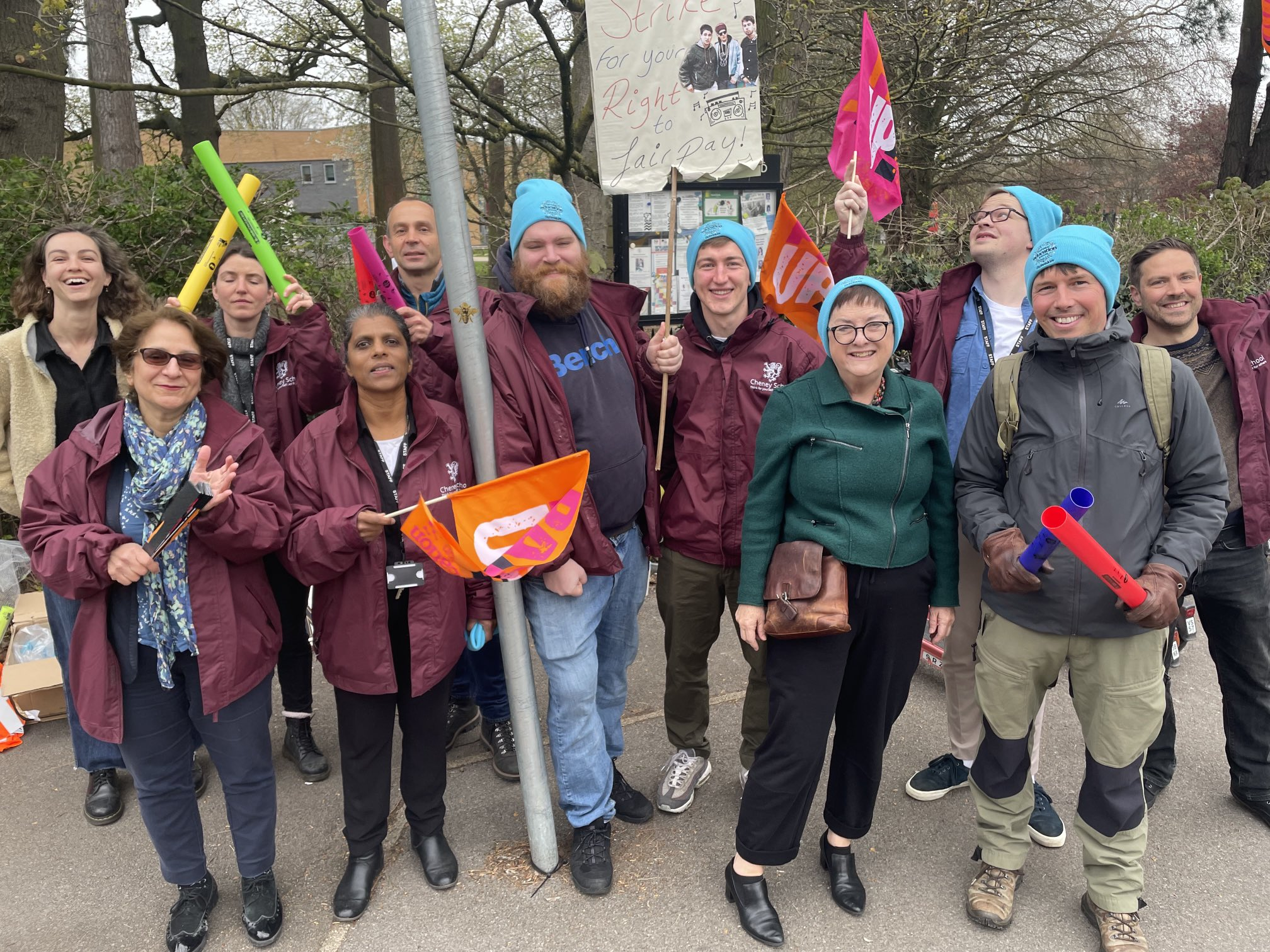
Bousted with a picket line of striking workers outside Cheney School, Oxford, in 2023

Bousted taught English from 1982 to 1987 at Bentley Wood High School in Harrow, London. From 1988 to 1991, she was Head of English at Whitmore High School in Harrow. In 1991, Bousted became a lecturer at the University of York, her alma mater, and was appointed its director of initial teacher training in 1995. From 1997 to 1999, she was Head of Secondary Education at Edge Hill College (which later became Edge Hill University), then the head of the School of Education at Kingston University from 1999 to 2003.

On 7 April 2003, Bousted was elected as the general secretary of the Association of Teachers and Lecturers (ATL) following Peter Smith's retirement, becoming the first woman to lead a major teachers' trade union. In the election she received 6,431 votes and she won against Hank Roberts, who received 6,328 votes. She applied for the role after seeing an advertisement in The Guardian and despite never having been a member of the ATL. Bousted served two terms as a member of the Acas council from 2010 to 2016, and chaired its audit committee. Upon the ATL's merger with the National Union of Teachers (NUT) in September 2017 to form the National Education Union (NEU), she became the NEU's joint general secretary alongside Kevin Courtney, the former head of the NUT. Bousted and Courtney were succeeded by Daniel Kebede as the sole general secretary of the NEU in September 2023.

On 14 September 2016, Bousted was elected President of the Trades Union Congress, replacing Liz Snape of Unison. She was succeeded by Sally Hunt of the University and College Union on 13 September 2017.

Bousted was awarded an honorary Doctor of Education degree by Edge Hill University in 2010. She was granted an honorary professorship in the UCL Institute of Education's Centre for Teachers and Teaching Research in 2024.

In late 2024, Bousted was nominated for a Labour Party life peerage by Prime Minister Keir Starmer. She was created Baroness Bousted, of Bleasdale in the County of Lancashire, on 27 January 2025, and was introduced to the House of Lords on 6 February.

== Personal life ==
Bousted married Donald Bousted in 1983. They have a daughter.

Trade union offices
Preceded by Peter Smith	General Secretary of the Association of Teachers and Lecturers; 2003–2017	Merged into the National Education Union
Preceded by Liz Snape	President of the Trades Union Congress; 2016–2017	Succeeded by Sally Hunt
New office	General Secretary of the National Education Union; 2017–2023; Served alongside: Kevin Courtney	Succeeded by Daniel Kebede
