= Stockwell College of Education =

Teacher's college in London (1860–1980)

Coordinates: 51.4034°N 0.0215°E

- Motto: Noblesse oblige
- Type: Public
- Active: 1860–1980
- Location: Bromley, Greater London, UK

Stockwell College of Education was a teacher-training college based in South London, England. It was located in Stockwell, South London from 1860 to 1935 and then relocated to the grounds of Bromley Palace, Bromley until its closure in 1980.

== History ==
The College was founded in 1860 on a site at Stockwell, South London, by the British & Foreign School Society, for the purpose of training teachers. This continued the work of the Quaker Joseph Lancaster who had previously trained teachers in his school at Southwark. In 1861 the 75 female students of Borough Road College were transferred to the new establishment. The college awarded degree and postgraduate courses.

Students included pupil-teachers like Isabel Cleghorn who came to London with a scholarship in the 1870s. She returned to Sheffield where she led a school for thirty years and became the first woman to lead the National Union of Teachers.

In 1935 the college relocated to Bromley Palace, the former palace of the Bishops of Rochester. The 18th century house was adapted and extended to provide accommodation for the 114 women students.

During the Second World War (from 1940 to 1945) the college temporarily relocated to Watcombe Park, Devon.

Postcard showing the college buildings (circa 1970s)

On the return to Bromley in 1945, some buildings had been destroyed by bombs, public air raid shelters had been built on the site, high blast walls had been constructed that obscured some windows, the grounds had been let out to allotments, and the fabric of the Old Palace itself had been badly damaged. Over the following years some redevelopment and improvement of the site took place, and some temporary accommodation was found in Wanstead Road, a mile away from the site. The post-war building programme included:

- 1966 - The Ann Springman and Joseph Lancaster halls of residence (each accommodating 72 students)
- 1967 - Music House and West Lodge extension.
- 1968 - Thanet Hall of Residence (75 students) in Wanstead Road. Completion of North Wing, Rochester Wing and Library.
- 1969 - Adaptations in the Old Palace.
- 1970 - St. Blaise Building.

By 1960 there were approximately 200 women students following one or two year courses of training leading to the Teacher’s Certificate, plus a small group of men and women following a one-year supplementary course in Mathematics.

On 1 August 1960 responsibility for the college was transferred from the British and Foreign School Society to the Kent Education Committee. In April 1965, following the re-organisation of the Greater London Council and London Boroughs, the college buildings became the property of the London Borough of Bromley. The college became administered by a Joint Education Committee of Kent County Council and of the London Borough of Bromley.

From 1961 to 1972 the college progressed towards the target of 1,200 students as set by the Department of Education & Science.

From 1960 most students were admitted to the three-year initial teacher training course, which led to the Certificate in Education of the University of London. In 1968 a four year course leading to a Bachelor of Honours degree was introduced. In 1969 the college began to admit postgraduate students to a one-year course leading to the University’s Graduate Certificate in Education. Options were available for training for infant, junior and secondary age ranges, in a full range of subjects. In addition, the college offered a range of courses approved by the Department of Education & Science for serving teachers.

This period of expansion and development was halted in December 1972 by publication of the UK government’s White Paper, “Education—a Framework for Expansion”. The government imposed a policy of regression with a reduction of teacher training places; the college’s allocation was reduced from a target of 400 in 1972 to one of 95 in 1977. Finally, in June 1977 the Secretary of State for Education directed that there should be no further intake for initial teacher training courses.

To comply with government policy the college, while continuing its main and historic task of teacher education, actively moved into the broader spectrum of higher education. Courses were developed and validated by the University of London, leading to ordinary and honours degrees, which progressively replaced the Certificate in Education and B.Ed. education.

From 1977 to 1980 student numbers were progressively reduced. Two degree programmes, Education with Educational Broadcasting, and Music with Film and Television Studies, were transferred to Christ Church College, Canterbury, for a September 1980 entry.

The college closed on 31 August 1980. The site became part of Bromley Civic Centre in 1982.
