= Comprehensive Future =

English organisation against selective education

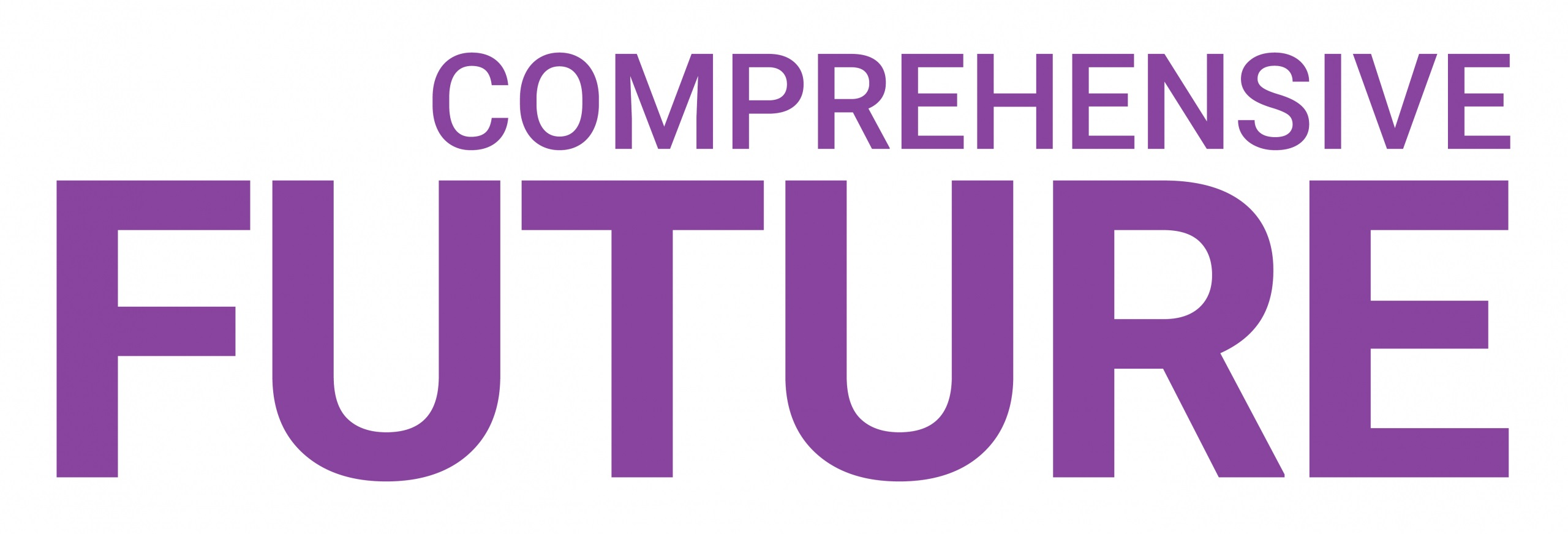
- Formation: 2003; 23 years ago
- Location: England
- Members: 1,100 members and supporters (2022)
- Chair: Nuala Burgess
- Website: comprehensivefuture.org.uk

Comprehensive Future is a campaign organisation in England that advocates for comprehensive secondary education and opposes academic selection through grammar schools and the 11-plus examination. The organisation seeks to promote non-selective schools to address educational inequality. Its campaigning focuses on grammar school admissions, social mobility and access to education for pupils with Special Educational Needs and Disabilities (SEND).

== History ==
Comprehensive Future was founded in 2003 by Margaret Tulloch, spokesperson for Campaign for State Education, Member of Parliament David Chaytor and the late Malcolm Horne whose personal campaigning against the iniquities of selective education dates back to 1965.

== Investigative research ==
In 2018, Comprehensive Future’s investigative work led to the Times Newspaper reporting, "Grammars paid 20 times more to expand than comprehensives." In response to questions about this from Shadow Education Secretary, Angela Rayner, the Schools Minister Nick Gibb confirmed grammar schools would no longer be able to apply for this funding. However, as Ian Widdows of the National Association of Secondary Moderns pointed out, the government had by then ring fenced £50m annual funding for grammars so the only thing which had changed was greater transparency.

In 2018, BBC News covered Comprehensive Future's research into the low numbers of children from lower socio-economic groups admitted to selective schools.

In 2024, their investigation into the 11-plus entrance exams revealed that grammar schools were raising tens of thousands of pounds each year as highlighted by The Guardian.

The group has also engaged with Department for Education (DfE) over its policies aimed at getting more pupils from lower income families into grammar schools.

== Legislative reform ==
In December 2022, the organisation's patron, Baroness Blower, introduced the School (Reform of Pupil Selection) Bill as a Private Member's Bill in the House of Lords. This proposed the gradual phasing out of academic selection across England and had the backing of Manchester Mayor and member of Comprehensive Future Andy Burnham and Tony Blair's former press secretary Alastair Campbell. Burnham joined Comprehensive Future, "In another minor act of defiance" over what he saw as a creeping snobbery about education. He described the benefits of comprehensive education as, "everyone educated together, seeing life from all sides and a broad curriculum catering for all talents."

== Organisation ==
Comprehensive Future is governed by an elected steering group. The current chair is Dr Nuala Burgess, with former GMB union general secretary John Edmonds and writer and journalist Melissa Benn serving as vice-chairs. The campaign's other patrons include Michael Rosen and former Labour Party leader Neil Kinnock.

== See also ==
- Comprehensive school
- Grammar schools in England
- 11-plus
- Educational inequality in the United Kingdom
