= Allan Levene =

British American information technology specialist

Allan Levene (born July 23, 1949) is a British-American information technology specialist. He is the first person to run for Congress in multiple states simultaneously. He was planning to simultaneously run for the United States House of Representatives in four different districts: Hawaii's 1st congressional district, Minnesota's 6th congressional district, Michigan's 14th congressional district, and his home district, Georgia's 11th congressional district as a member of the Republican Party. Due to ballot difficulties, he ended up running in two districts, Georgia's 11th District and Hawaii's 1st, which makes him the first person to run for Congress in multiple states at the same time. On May 20, 2014, Levene was defeated in the Georgia Republican primary. On August 9, 2014, Levene was defeated in the Hawaii Republican primary.

== Early life and career ==
Levene grew up in West Ham, London, in a middle-class family. His father ran a car storage facility called "Levene's Garages", while his mother was a homemaker. He attended Plaistow Grammar School. Levene emigrated to the United States when he was 21 years old. He worked as a life insurance salesman in San Diego to pay for college, then became a certified financial planner, specializing in municipal bonds.

Levene became a naturalized citizen of the United States. He formerly lived in Metro Detroit, before settling in Atlanta at the age of 32, to live with his wife and run a computer consulting business. His computer business has led him to spend time in Minnesota.

== Politics ==
Levene developed an interest in politics, and he challenged Phil Gingrey, the incumbent member of the United States House of Representatives in Georgia's 11th congressional district, in the Republican primary election. Gingrey won the primary with 81% of the vote and Levene qualified to run in the general election as a write-in candidate.

With Gingrey running for the United States Senate in 2014, Levene decided to run again for Gingrey's seat. To increase his chances of winning, he also declared his candidacy in Minnesota's 6th congressional district and Michigan's 14th congressional district, districts where he'd formerly lived and worked, and Hawaii's 1st congressional district, because he feels "living in Hawaii wouldn’t be bad". He confirmed that this was allowable with the Federal Election Commission, as long as he kept donations for each race separate, and with the secretaries of state for all four states. The United States Constitution only requires residency at the time of the general election. If he wins a primary, he will establish residency in that state and drop his other bids. His main focus was on winning the primary in Georgia, where the primary election was held on 20 May 2014.

Levene withdrew from the Minnesota race because of lack of 6th district voter interest and failed to obtain the 1,000 valid signatures in Michigan. After failing to obtain the required signatures in Michigan, his application to run for the New Hampshire's 1st district was denied by the N.H. Secretary of State. He was included on the Georgia and Hawaii primary Republican ballots.

Levene lost the primaries in Georgia and in Hawaii. He says that he'll run again if he can raise significant campaign contributions, lacking in his first multi-state races.

== Foreign policy ==
Levene has proposed a coastal enclave of "New Israel" in South Texas along the Laguna Madre, to be located south of Baffin Bay and east of U.S. Route 77, as an alternative Middle East peace proposal to be granted in exchange for the evacuation of Israeli settlements in the Palestinian West Bank. The enclave would not reach the Rio Grande Valley at the southernmost tip of Texas, however, and hence would leave the existing Mexico–United States border intact.

Under this arrangement, Israel would continue to exist within its pre-1967 borders, with "New Israel" as an added overseas territory, intended to stimulate both the Israeli and Texan economies by a brisk border trade. Levene considers the proposal feasible because of the low population density in this part of Texas (particularly, Kenedy County has a population of only 416).

Levene's platform included the elimination of U.S. federal corporate taxes to make the U.S. the world's largest tax haven. He believed that trillions of dollars of foreign investment funds would instantly flow into the United States. It would be invested in new facilities by foreign investors and corporations sparking a new economic boom, and a massive increase in employment. The millions of new jobs would substantially reduce federal and state unemployment expenditures and the new income taxes generated would substantially offset the loss of federal corporate tax revenue.

He also wanted to develop a practical alternative to a Term Limits Amendment. His idea was to eliminate the congressional pensions of all incumbents who ran for office again after a maximum of twelve years in the House or Senate. He believed that the motivation to retire and take a potentially substantial lifetime pension would overcome the desire to run for office after this period. As a part of that proposal, all raised campaign funds would be given to charity after each election cycle so that all candidate started each campaign at zero, and that candidate loans to committees would be banned. Levene believed that this would create a fairer system without incumbents having vastly more money than challengers.

== See also ==
- Galveston Movement
- Two-state solution
