= Christine Blower, Baroness Blower =

British trade unionist (born 1951)

The Right Honourable The Baroness Blower
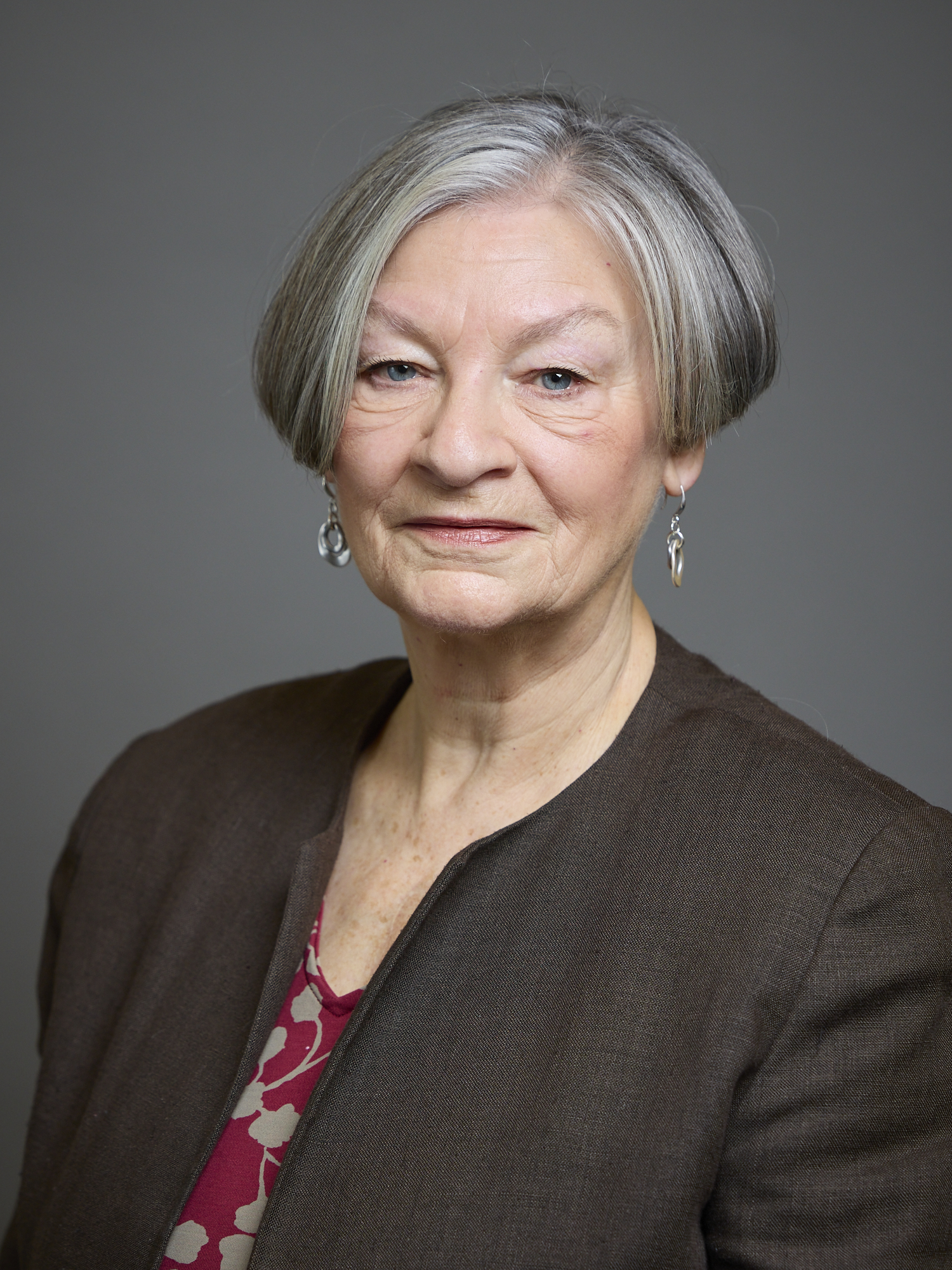
- Blower in 2024
- Born: 20 April 1951 (age 75); Surrey, England
- Office: General Secretary of the National Union of Teachers
- Term: 2009–2016
- Predecessor: Steve Sinnott
- Successor: Kevin Courtney
- Political party: Labour
- Spouse: Dennis Charman
- Children: Two

Member of the House of Lords
- Lord Temporal
- Life peerage 15 October 2019

Christine Blower, Baroness Blower (born 20 April 1951) is a British schoolteacher and trade unionist who served as the eleventh General Secretary of the National Union of Teachers, a trade union representing qualified teachers across England and Wales. In March 2018, she stood for election and was shortlisted for the position of the Labour Party's General Secretary. She is the Vice Chair of the pressure group Unite Against Fascism.

== Early life ==
She was born in Surrey, part of the Home Counties.

Her father was a coalminer in his younger days in the north east of England, and then a GPO engineer, as well as a Labour supporter.

She grew up in Chessington and attended Ellingham County Primary School and then Tolworth Girls School, a bi-lateral school where she was educated in the grammar stream. Having contemplated a career in law or probation work, she instead trained as a teacher.

== Teaching career ==
In 1973, she took her first teaching post, at Holland Park School, a comprehensive in Kensington and Chelsea which was then part of the Inner London Education Authority, where she taught French. At the time, the school had changed from streamed teaching to mixed-ability teaching, a style of teaching she prefers as it does not "create the sheep and goats situation that comprehensives were set up to avoid". Her daughter Sophie later attended the school.

In 1980, she became Head of Modern Languages at St Edmund's Secondary School in Fulham, then Head of Department at Quintin Kynaston School in Westminster in 1983.

With the threatened break up of the ILEA, Blower moved back to Hammersmith and Fulham in 1990 and concentrated on working with young teenagers at risk of care or custody at Farm Lane Adolescent Resource Centre. After its closure, she was redeployed as a member of the local authority's Behaviour Support Team. As she explained in 1997, "The brief of the team is to try and deal with the behaviour in order to calm the children down, get them focussed in on tasks so they can stay in the mainstream".

=== National Union of Teachers ===
Blower joined the NUT at the start of her teaching career. Between 1986 and 2004 she held various posts in the West London association, including Secretary.

She was elected to the National Executive of the NUT between 1992 and 2000.

Other positions include national vice-president in 1996 and then the 125th national president of the NUT from 28 March 1997 to 10 April 1998, succeeding Carole Regan. Blower used this platform to argue for a greater role for teachers in the running of Pupil Referral Units and for "properly resourced nursery provision". She was a critic of grammar schools, SATs and the schools regulator. Of the latter, she argued that "much of what people have to do for Ofsted is an utter waste of time".

Blower failed in her bid to be elected as general secretary in 1999, with incumbent Doug McAvoy re-elected with a 17,000 majority. She was later elected Deputy general secretary on 28 January 2005 under his successor Steve Sinnott.

After the sudden death of Sinnott while in post, she became acting general secretary on 5 April 2008, and led the union's first national strike in two decades – over teachers' pay – a fortnight later.

On 5 May 2009, she was elected unopposed as the first woman general secretary of the NUT.

In February 2013, in line with the NUT, Blower was among those who gave their support to the People's Assembly in a letter published by The Guardian newspaper. She also gave a speech at the People's Assembly Conference held at Westminster Central Hall on 22 June 2013.

=== SATs ===
Blower has aligned herself to long-standing NUT criticisms of the standard assessment tests (or SATs) in schools, including the national boycotts led by the union in 1993 and 2010.

Her opposition has centred on the tests' use in the compilation of national league tables, which the NUT would also like to see abolished. Blower has referred to the tests as "high stakes", with teachers under pressure to narrow the curriculum, "skewing everything to enable their pupils to jump through a series of unnecessary hoops". Addressing the Government's position in the magazine Tribune, she wrote: "Tests do not drive up standards. They just cause additional stress for pupils, teachers and parents. Teachers are continually rushing to deliver a huge curriculum that ends up unbalanced because of the pressure to reach Government-imposed targets. Many feel that they cannot depart from the restrictions of the national curriculum".

Under Blower's leadership, the NUT has published its proposals for alternative approaches to assessment, most recently in conjunction with the NAHT in 2009 and with ATL in 2010. A further document co-authored by the three unions was published in December 2010.

In her presidential address to NUT Conference on 29 March 1997, Blower reported that in the previous year her daughter Sophie had been withdrawn from the Key Stage 2 tests.

She told delegates, "As a parent and a teacher, I will continue to support campaigns to rid education of blanket testing of our children." There was much criticism of this 'direct action' in the press, but defending herself, Blower argued that "[Sophie] did something considerably more useful with her time than if she'd been at school during the tests". This element of her speech was portrayed by some as an example of hard left militancy.

=== Academies and free schools ===
The NUT under Blower's leadership has been a vocal critic of the Academies programme, both in its original New Labour model through to the expansions brought about by the Academies Act 2010 which favours schools rated "outstanding" by Ofsted.

Policy introduced by Michael Gove also allows for free schools, newly founded and directly funded schools intended to fulfil a local need and with freedoms very similar to Academies. The NUT opposes Free Schools and Blower has voiced concerns that they are able to employ teaching staff without Qualified Teacher Status.

Both of these types of school are outside LEA control and have the potential to make Collective bargaining more difficult.

Blower has disputed the success of the Swedish system as well as American charter schools, both regularly cited by Michael Gove as exemplars of narrowing the social divide.

In a cover story for The Spectator magazine in August 2010, it was claimed that NUT activists were "bullying" head teachers known to be considering academy conversion and, with it, a break from local authority control.

== Politics ==
Blower was a Labour member until the early 1990s. In 1982, she stood as a Labour candidate for East Putney ward on Wandsworth Council, but was not elected, with the three seats being held by the Conservative Party; one of the winning Conservatives whom Blower stood against was future MP Christopher Chope.

Speaking before the May 1997 general election, she distanced herself from Labour leader Tony Blair's New Labour rebranding of the party. Two years later, she told a journalist that she was "to the left of old Labour" and confirmed that she had no affiliation to any political party or group. However, in 2000, she was a member of the London Socialist Alliance, ahead of the Greater London Assembly Elections. She said at the time that it "was formed to prevent disillusionment with Labour giving a new birth to the far right as it did in the 1970s". At this election, she ran for election as the party candidate in West Central and on the multi-member party list system; she was unsuccessful on both.

In March 2016, ahead of her departure as general secretary of the NUT, Blower announced that she would be joining the Labour Party "led by Jeremy Corbyn, to fight for the better world we know is possible". She was shortlisted for the post of Labour's general secretary in 2018, but the role instead went to her opponent, fellow trade unionist Jennie Formby.

Blower was nominated for a life peerage in the 2019 Prime Minister's Resignation Honours. She was created Baroness Blower, of Starch Green in the London Borough of Hammersmith and Fulham, on 15 October 2019. As a Labour peer, she has sat in the House of Lords since 4 November 2019.

On 13 October 2020, Blower was appointed as a Director of the Peace & Justice Project, which was created by suspended Labour MP and former leader of the Labour Party Jeremy Corbyn. In 17 January 2021, Blower appeared as a featured panellist at the launch of the Peace & Justice Project. On 27 March 2023 she resigned as a Director.

== Family ==
Her partner of thirty seven years, Dennis Charman, a retired teacher, was secretary of Hammersmith and Fulham NUT.

Her two daughters have taken the double-barrelled surname Charman-Blower. Sophie attended the University of Edinburgh, where she acted as Edinburgh spokesperson for the Stop the War coalition, whilst studying ancient civilisations of the Mediterranean and Middle East. She followed this up with an MA in human rights law at SOAS, University of London, and now works for Marie Stopes International. She attempted to be selected as the Labour candidate for the London Assembly constituency of West Central in 2020, but was unsuccessful.

== Elections contested ==
London Assembly election

| Date of election | Constituency | Party | Votes | % |
|---|---|---|---|---|
| 2000 | West Central | LSA | 2,720 | 2.6 |

| Date of election | Party | Votes | % | Results | Notes |
|---|---|---|---|---|---|
| 2000 | LSA | 27,073 | 1.6 | Not elected | Multi-member party list |

Trade union offices
| Preceded by Carole Regan | President of the National Union of Teachers; 1997–1998 | Succeeded by Maureen Skevington |
| Preceded by Steve Sinnott | Deputy General Secretary of the National Union of Teachers; 2005–2009 | Succeeded by Kevin Courtney |
| Preceded by Steve Sinnott | General Secretary of the National Union of Teachers; 2009 – May 2016 | Succeeded by Kevin Courtney |
