= Marshall Jackman =

British trade unionist and politician

Marshall James Jackman (1860 – 2 August 1938) was a British trade unionist and politician, who served on the London County Council.

== Life ==
Born in Exeter, Jackman became a pupil teacher, then trained as a teacher at the Borough Road College in London. He became an assistant master, then a master, and finally a school inspector, for the London County Council.

Jackman was also active in the National Union of Teachers, in which he worked closely with Thomas Macnamara. He served on its executive from 1893, and was the union's president in 1900, and again in 1910. He was succeeded as President in 1911 by Isabel Cleghorn who was the unions first woman to hold the position.

Jackman joined the Labour Party, and after he retired, he won a seat in Hackney South at the 1928 London County Council election, serving until 1934. He then moved to Cornwall, where he died four years later.

Trade union offices
Preceded by Thomas Clancy	President of the National Union of Teachers; 1900	Succeeded by James Blacker
Preceded by C. W. Hole	President of the National Union of Teachers; 1910	Succeeded by Isabel Cleghorn
