= Liz Snape =

British trade unionist

Elizabeth Mary Snape MBE (born February 1961) is a British trade unionist.

Snape was born in Liverpool, and grew up in West Derby, Moreton and Maghull. She studied Spanish and Russian at Liverpool Polytechnic, where she became president of the student union, and also joined the Labour Party. She moved to London in 1989, where she found work with the National and Local Government Officers' Association (NALGO). Through the union she met Dave Prentis, the two entering a long-term relationship and having two children together.

NALGO became part of Unison in 1993, and Snape gradually rose to prominence in the union. She served as the Trades Union Congress (TUC) representative on the Women at Work Commission in 2004. In 2006, she became Unison's Director of Policy and Public Affairs, and then in 2011 was appointed as one of its three assistant general secretaries. She has served on the General Council of the TUC for many years, and was President of the TUC from 2015 to 2016.

Snape was made a Member of the Order of the British Empire in 2007.

Trade union offices
Preceded by Leslie Manasseh	President of the Trades Union Congress; 2015–2016	Succeeded by Mary Bousted
