= Royal Commission on Secondary Education =

Royal Commission on Secondary Education in England was a Royal Commission which reported in 1895 and was chaired by James Bryce, 1st Viscount Bryce.

It was the first Royal Commission to include women as full Commissioners, with Sophie Bryant, Lady Lucy Cavendish and Eleanor Mildred Sidgwick taking part.

The Commission was concerned with the organisation and administration of secondary education in England and Wales.

The recommendations in the Commission's report led to the Board of Education Act 1899 and the creation of a Board of Education, the fore-runner to the UKs Ministry of Education.
