= William Bridgland Steer =

British trade unionist and politician

William Bridgland Steer (1867 – 26 March 1939) was a British trade unionist and politician.

Born in East Grinstead, Steer attended East Grinstead Board School and then Westminster Training College, qualifying as a teacher with a degree from London University. He moved to Derby to become an assistant schoolmaster, and became active in the Derby Teachers' Association and the Derby Class Teachers’ Association, serving as president of each in the early 1900s. From 1904, he worked at Derby Municipal Secondary School.

Steer was active in the National Union of Teachers (NUT), and was first elected to its executive committee in 1905. Also prominent in the National Federation of Class Teachers, he was its president in 1907, and its treasurer from 1910 until 1927. He served as President of the NUT from 1914 to 1916.

During World War I, Steer served on the Workers' National War Emergency Committee, and from the end of the war he sat on the Secondary School Burnham Committee. He also became active in the Labour Party, standing for it in Dudley at the 1918 United Kingdom general election, where he took second place with 39.8% of the vote, and in Walthamstow East in 1922, where he again managed second place, this time with 32.6% of the votes cast.

Steer was elected to Derby Borough Council, and served as chair of the city's education committee. He retired from teaching in 1927, opening the Oakcroft Press, and writing a number of educational books for children.

Trade union offices
| Preceded by A. W. Dakers | President of the National Union of Teachers; 1914–1916 | Succeeded by Charles Williamson Crook |
