= Frederick Mander =

British trade unionist

Sir Frederick Mander
- Born: 12 July 1883; Luton, Bedfordshire
- Died: 27 February 1964
- Occupation: Headmaster

Sir Frederick Mander FEIS (12 July 1883 – 27 February 1964) was a headmaster and trade unionist and the General Secretary of the National Union of Teachers (NUT) from 1931 to 1947.

Mander was born in Luton in Bedfordshire, the son of Arthur Mander, an iron plate worker, and his wife, Carrie Ellingham. At birth he was registered as Fred, and this name appeared on his marriage certificate in 1911, but in later years he was known as Frederick. Mander was educated at the Luton Higher Grade School before training to become a teacher at Westminster Training College. He obtained an external BSc degree from the University of London. He was already a schoolmaster when he married Hilda Irene Sargent (1883/4–1965) on 2 September 1911.

Mander was the headmaster of a school in Luton from 1915 to 1931. He joined the National Union of Teachers (NUT) and was elected to its executive committee in 1922. In 1923 he was involved in the Lowestoft Strike, when at least 167 teachers struck for eleven months in protest at the Local Education Authority's decision to reduce teachers' salaries by 10 per cent. The actions of the LEA were widely condemned after the NUT were able to prove that the non-union 'blackleg' teachers employed by the LEA were inadequate. Following the strikers' action, in 1926 the Board of Education ruled that teachers' salaries should be agreed at a national level by the Burnham Committee. Mander became Vice-President of the NUT in 1926 and President in 1927. He resigned as headmaster of his Luton school to become the NUT's General Secretary, a position he held from 1931 to 1947, when he retired. In 1931 Mander opposed government demands that teachers' pay should be reduced by up to 30 per cent because of the economic crisis at that time. The reduction was eventually limited to 10 per cent. He was knighted in 1938.

He was the Vice President of the National Foundation for Educational Research from 1948 until his death in 1964.

The Mander College of Further Education in Bedford College was built in 1959 and was named after him. Mander was Chairman of Bedfordshire County Council between 1952 and 1962, and was a member of the Executive of the Association of Education Committees. He was the President of the Bedfordshire Natural History Society.

Sir Frederick Mander died at the Luton and Dunstable Hospital in 1964 aged 80. He was survived by his wife and two sons and a daughter.

Trade union offices
| Preceded by Fred Barraclough | President of the National Union of Teachers; 1927–1928 | Succeeded by William Willis Hill |
| Preceded by Sir Frank Goldstone | General Secretary of the National Union of Teachers; 1931–1947 | Succeeded by Ronald Gould |
