= Plaistow County Grammar School =

Location
- Prince Regent Lane; Plaistow, Greater London, E13 8SG; England; 51.5223°N 0.0304°E

Information
- Type: Grammar School
- Motto: Non Quo, Sed Quomodo (Not To What End, But How), Deo Confidimus (In God We Trust)
- Established: 1945
- Closed: 1972
- Local authority: Newham
- Department for Education URN: 102783 Tables
- Final Headmaster: Gerard Ward
- Gender: Mixed
- Age: 11 to 18
- Houses: Barking, Beckton, Cumberland, Regent
- Publication: The Plaistovian

Plaistow County Grammar School, also known as "Plaistow Grammar" or "PGS", was a local authority mixed gender Grammar school established in 1945 and located on Prince Regent Lane (A112) in Plaistow, in the County Borough of West Ham and then the London Borough of Newham in east London. It was disestablished in 1972 upon its merging to create a Comprehensive school.

== History ==
The school first opened in 1926 as Plaistow Secondary School on the site in the south of the borough, and was designed to cater for 250 pupils A second quadrangle was completed in 1930 increasing the capacity to 600, reaching a similar enrolment to that of West Ham Secondary School (until 1925 known as West Ham Central Secondary School), its counterpart in the north of the borough. In 1930 the school magazine The Plaistovian (Plaistovian meaning of or belonging to Plaistow) was launched and publication continued until the school was merged in 1972. Among the initial editorial staff was pupil Norman Price who later became Chairman of the Board of Inland Revenue and obtain a knighthood.

The Latin motto of the original secondary school was Non Quo, Sed Quomodo. Dr Harold Priestley's book Plaistow Sec: The Story of a School, credits this to Miss M "Maggie" Lamb, MA, an English teacher who joined the school in 1927 and who translated it as "Not to what end, but how" (also translated as "Not by whom but in what manner"), in other words the end does not justify the means or (colloquially) "It ain't what you do it's the way that you do it". In the 1950s the motto of the County Borough of West Ham, Deo Confidimus (translated as "In God we trust"), was adopted. After West Ham joined with the County Borough of East Ham and small parts of Barking and Woolwich to form the London Borough of Newham in 1965, the school's motto remained.

Before and during the second world war, pupils and staff were evacuated at various times to (briefly) Wellington in Somerset, then to Weymouth in Dorset, South Molton in Devon, Helston and Newquay, both in Cornwall.

The school became Plaistow Grammar School in September 1945 as a result of the Education Act of 1944, and subsequently Plaistow County Grammar School.

The school's badge was featured in the 16 July 1960 issue (No.1829) of the British comic The Rover.

In 1972, following the 1965 changes in educational infrastructure proposed by the Ministry of Education, the school was merged with Faraday Secondary Modern School of Denmark Street, E13, to become Cumberland Comprehensive School. The name Cumberland Comprehensive was taken from Cumberland Road, which ran past Faraday Secondary Modern and past the Cumberland Road Playing Fields which abutted the grammar school and were routinely used by it for physical education. Cumberland operated across both sites, with the lower school occupying the former Faraday premises and the upper school using the former grammar school buildings.

== Houses ==
Plaistow Secondary School and Plaistow Grammar operated a House system to create competition, rivalry and team spirit. Pupils were allocated to one of four Houses – Barking, Regent, Beckton and Cumberland (named after four roads to the north, east, south and west of the school). Each House had a distinctive colour worn for sports and during physical education.

== Admissions ==
The selective admission to the grammar school was gained through the Eleven plus exam although in some cases pupils were able to transfer from a Secondary modern school on evaluation by the local education authority.

== Curriculum ==
The broad curriculum was focused on academic rather than vocational education, and included languages, sciences, art, and music subjects, culminating in RSA, CSE, GCE O-level and GCE A-level exams, while other certificates were also offered. Examination results became among the best in the borough, with many pupils gaining entrance to university.

== Notable alumni ==
- Paul Bach, journalist
- Joe Brown, MBE, singer/entertainer
- Paul Brush, soccer player
- Sir Ben Helfgott, MBE, Olympic weightlifter
- Fred Jarvis, CBE, trade unionist
- Allan Levene, information technology specialist
- Malcolm McFee, actor
- Sir Norman Price, KCB, chairman of the board of Inland Revenue
- Chris Stamp, music producer and manager, psychodrama therapist
- Terence Stamp, actor

== Current use ==
Cumberland eventually moved to a single site. The borough of Newham adopted a re-organised sixth form education system, establishing the Newham Sixth Form College which, after some new construction work, moved in to the Prince Regent Lane premises and opened its doors to students in September 1992. The majority of the old, single-storey, Plaistow Grammar classrooms still exist but, over the years, many new buildings have been added by the college.
