= Fred Jarvis =

British trade unionist (1924–2020)

Fred Jarvis CBE
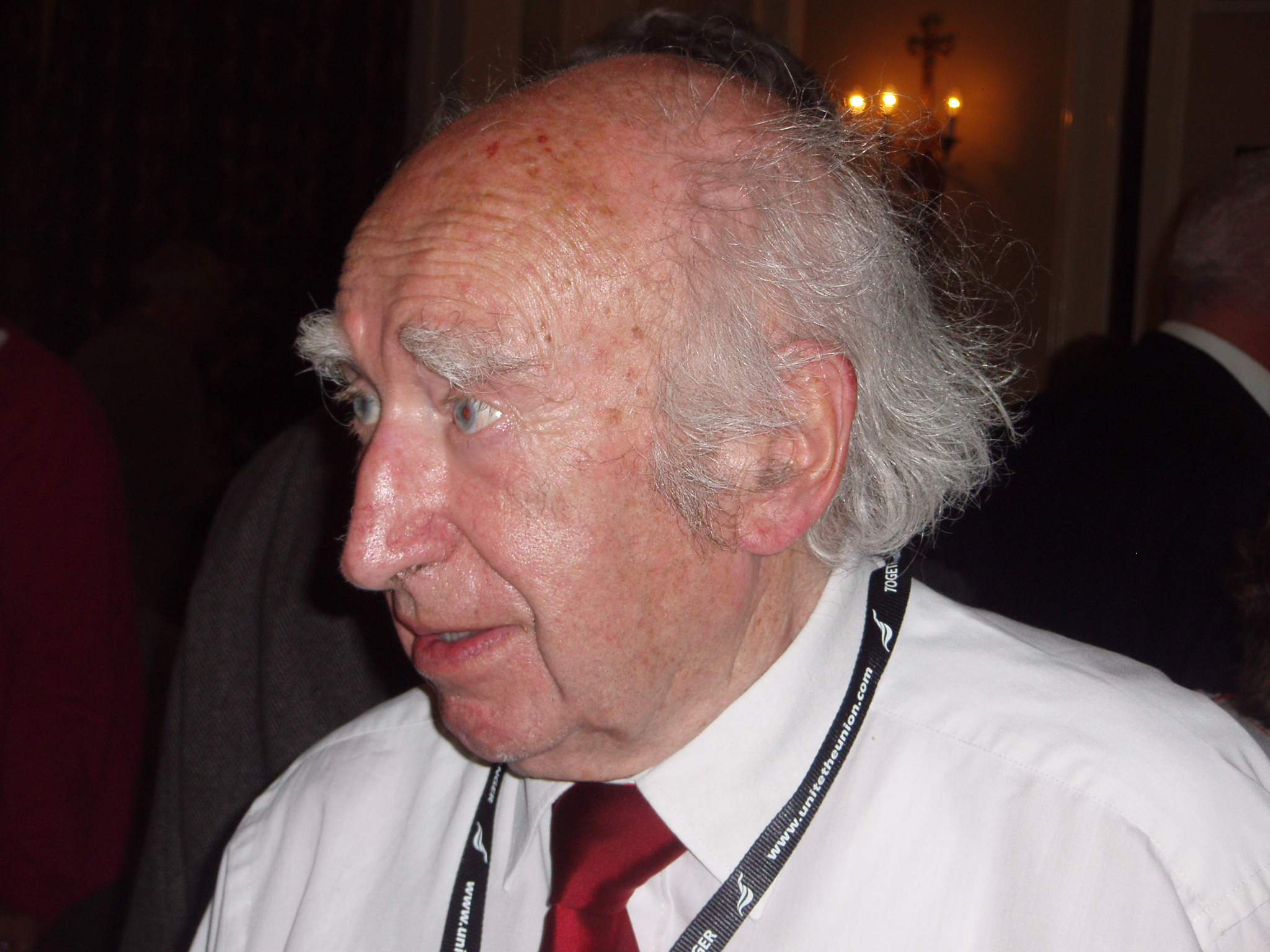
- Jarvis at the Labour Party Conference (2009)
- Born: Frederick Frank Jarvis; 8 September 1924; West Ham (formerly part of Essex)
- Died: 15 June 2020 (aged 95); Barnet, London
- Education: Plaistow Secondary School; Wallasey Grammar School
- Alma mater: University of Liverpool; St Catherine's College, Oxford
- Political party: Labour Party
- Spouse: Anne Colegrove (m. 1954; died 2007)
- Children: 2
- Awards: 2008 - Labour Party’s National Merit Award; 2009 - NUS Lifetime Contribution Award; 2013 - Times Educational Supplement Lifetime Service to Education
- Military career
- Allegiance: United Kingdom
- Branch: British Army
- Rank: Sergeant
- Units: 76th (Highland) Field Regiment, Royal Artillery; British occupation zone in Germany
- Conflicts: World War II; Normandy landings

President of the Trades Union Congress
- In office 1987
- Preceded by: Ken Gill
- Succeeded by: Clive Jenkins

General Secretary of the National Union of Teachers
- In office 1975-1989
- Preceded by: Edward Britton
- Succeeded by: Doug McAvoy

President of the National Union of Students
- In office 1954-1955
- Preceded by: John M Thompson
- Succeeded by: Frank H Copplestone
- Website: fredjarvis.co.uk

Frederick Frank Jarvis CBE (8 September 1924 – 15 June 2020) was a British trade union leader. He was President of the National Union of Students (NUS) from 1952 to 1954 and General Secretary of the National Union of Teachers (NUT) from 1975 to 1989. Jarvis served as President of the Trades Union Congress in 1987, the first Oxford graduate to hold that position.

== Early life and education ==
Jarvis was born in West Ham, at that time in Essex but now part of the London Borough of Newham, into a working class family. He retained his Cockney accent as an adult. As a child, he attended Plaistow Secondary School in what was then the County Borough of West Ham in Essex. His father worked in a flour mill. His mother believed in the importance of education for her sons. At the start of World War II, the family moved to Wallasey where he attended Wallasey Grammar School and joined the Progressive Youth Movement.

Later in the war, he joined the Army, taking part in the Normandy landings.

In 1947, he attended University of Liverpool for a Diploma in Social Sciences, and went on to obtain a BA (Hons) in Philosophy, Politics and Economics at St Catherine's College, Oxford. He married Anne Colegrove, herself a vice-president of the NUS, in 1954.

== Political activity ==
In 1951, Jarvis fought the safely-Conservative seat of Wallasey on behalf of the Labour Party, and lost to the incumbent, Ernest Marples, by 15,705 votes.

== Personal life ==
Jarvis was married to the former Anne Colegrove from 1954 to her death in 2007. Anne Jarvis was a teacher and was herself active in politics, notably serving as a local councillor in Barnet, where they had resided since 1954. They had two children.

Jarvis was a lifelong supporter of West Ham United Football Club.

A keen photographer, Jarvis had an exhibition of his work at the TUC Centre in 2010 in aid of the North London Hospice.

In 2014 he published his autobiography You Never Know Your Luck.

Jarvis died on 15 June 2020 at the age of 95.

== Honours and recognitions ==
Jarvis received the Labour Party's National Merit Award in 2008. The following year, he was awarded the Lifetime Commitment Award by the NUS, the organisation he once presided over. In 2013, Times Educational Supplement awarded him its first Lifetime Service to Education award.

Jarvis was appointed Commander of the Order of the British Empire (CBE) in the 2015 New Year Honours.

== Fred and Anne Jarvis Award ==
Named after Jarvis and his late wife, the Fred and Anne Jarvis Award was established in 2007 and presented annually by the NUT. Originally for individuals outside the NUT who have campaigned tirelessly for children and young people, in 2017 the award was given to a NUT member. From 2019 the award has been presented by the National Education Union, which has succeeded the NUT.

Winners include writers Robin Alexander, Melissa Benn, Alan Gibbons, Fiona Millar and Onjali Q. Raúf MBE, former child prodigy Dr Anne-Marie Imafidon MBE, England international footballer Marcus Rashford MBE, former Children's Laureate Michael Rosen and Nobel Peace Prize laureate Malala Yousafzai.

== Footnotes ==
Trade union offices
| Preceded by John M. Thompson | President of the National Union of Students; 1952–1954 | Succeeded by Frank H. Copplestone |
| Preceded by Ernest Naisbitt | Deputy General Secretary of the National Union of Teachers; 1970–1974 | Succeeded by Doug McAvoy |
| Preceded by Sir Edward Britton | General Secretary of the National Union of Teachers; 1975–1989 | Succeeded by Doug McAvoy |
| Preceded by Ken Gill | President of the Trades Union Congress; 1987 | Succeeded by Clive Jenkins |
| Preceded by Bill Sirs | Trades Union Congress representative to the AFL-CIO; 1987 | Succeeded by Alec Smith |
