= The Kingsway Academy =

Former co-educational secondary school in Leasowe, Wirral, England

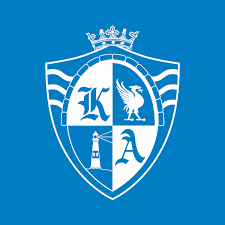

Location
- Birket Avenue; Leasowe, Merseyside, CH46 1RB; England; 53.41211°N 3.09421°W

Information
- Type: Academy
- Founder: Amanda Cawood
- Closed: August 31, 2018
- Trust: Northern Schools Trust
- Department for Education URN: 141131 Tables
- Ofsted: Reports
- Chair of the Governing Body: Lyndsay Macaulay
- Executive Principal: Shelagh Potter
- Gender: Coeducational
- Age: 11 to 18
- Houses: Lever, Paxton, Rathbone, Tate
- Colours: Yellow, green, red, blue
- Website: kingsway.academy

The Kingsway Academy (formerly Wallasey School) was a coeducational secondary school and sixth form located in Leasowe in the English county of Merseyside.

Wallasey Grammar School in the Wirral area was first constructed on St George's Road. A picture was painted by Victorian artist John Henry Robinson (1852–1922) of the first school building, and another by Harold Hopps (1879–1967) In 1876 it moved to Withens Lane. It moved again to a site purchased from the Navy in 1911, moving its former premises on Flag Field. The site once occupied by the now defunct grammar school is now occupied by Liscard Primary School. A Technical College was opened next door in 1963. The grammar moved to Leasowe in 1967, and later became Wallasey Comprehensive School.

Previously a community school administered by Wirral Metropolitan Borough Council, Wallasey School converted to academy status in February 2015. However the school had already been renamed The Kingsway Academy in September 2014.

On 3 July 2017 it was confirmed by the school that it would close down in August 2018. The Kingsway Academy then officially closed on 31 August 2018.

== Notable former pupils ==
=== Wallasey Grammar School ===
- Brooke Benjamin FRS, physicist, known for nonlinear differential equations
- Peter Benson (actor)
- Robert Campbell (art gallery director)
- Arthur Christiansen, editor from 1933 to 1957 of the Daily Express
- Alan Clarke, television and film director, who directed the 1987 film Rita, Sue and Bob Too
- William Crampton, vexillologist (flags)
- Fred Jarvis, trade union leader
- Albert Edward Litherland FRS FRSC, physicist
- Neil McKechnie, swimmer in the 400m freestyle at the 1956 Summer Olympics in Melbourne
- Fred Perry, tennis player (briefly in 1920)
- Major-General Freddie Plaskett CB MBE, Director-General from 1981 to 1988 of the Road Haulage Association
- Graham Stark, actor, notably as policemen in The Pink Panther films
- Cyril Taylor (doctor), pioneered NHS health centres, and President from 1980 to 1989 of the Socialist Health Association
- Sir Malcolm Thornton, Conservative MP from 1979 to 1983 for Liverpool Garston, and from 1983 to 1997 for Crosby (replacing Shirley Williams)
- Victor Tindall CBE, rugby union international, and later Professor of Obstetrics and Gynaecology from 1972 at the University of Manchester
- Robert Williams FRS, chemist, won the Royal Medal in 1995
- Sir Alan Herries Wilson FRS, mathematician, Chairman from 1963 to 1973 of Glaxo, and President from 1963 to 1964 of the Institute of Physics
- Peter Worsley, sociologist who coined the term Third World, and Professor of Sociology from 1964 at the University of Manchester

== See also ==
- List of English and Welsh endowed schools (19th century)
