= Isabel Cleghorn =

British educationist and suffragist (1852–1922)

- Born: 14 March 1852; Rochester, Kent, England
- Died: 4 December 1922 (aged 70); Sheffield, England
- Education: Stockwell Training College
- Occupation: headteacher
- Known for: educationalist
- Predecessor: Marshall Jackman (as NUT President)

Isabel Cleghorn LLA (14 March 1852 – 4 December 1922) was a British educationist and suffragist. She was the headteacher at Heeley which is now part of Sheffield and she was the first woman President of the National Union of Teachers in 1911.

== Life ==
Cleghorn was born in Rochester. Her parents were Mary Ann (born Robinson) and Alexander Cleghorn. She became a pupil-teacher and she was awarded a scholarship to go to London to be trained at Stockwell Training College.

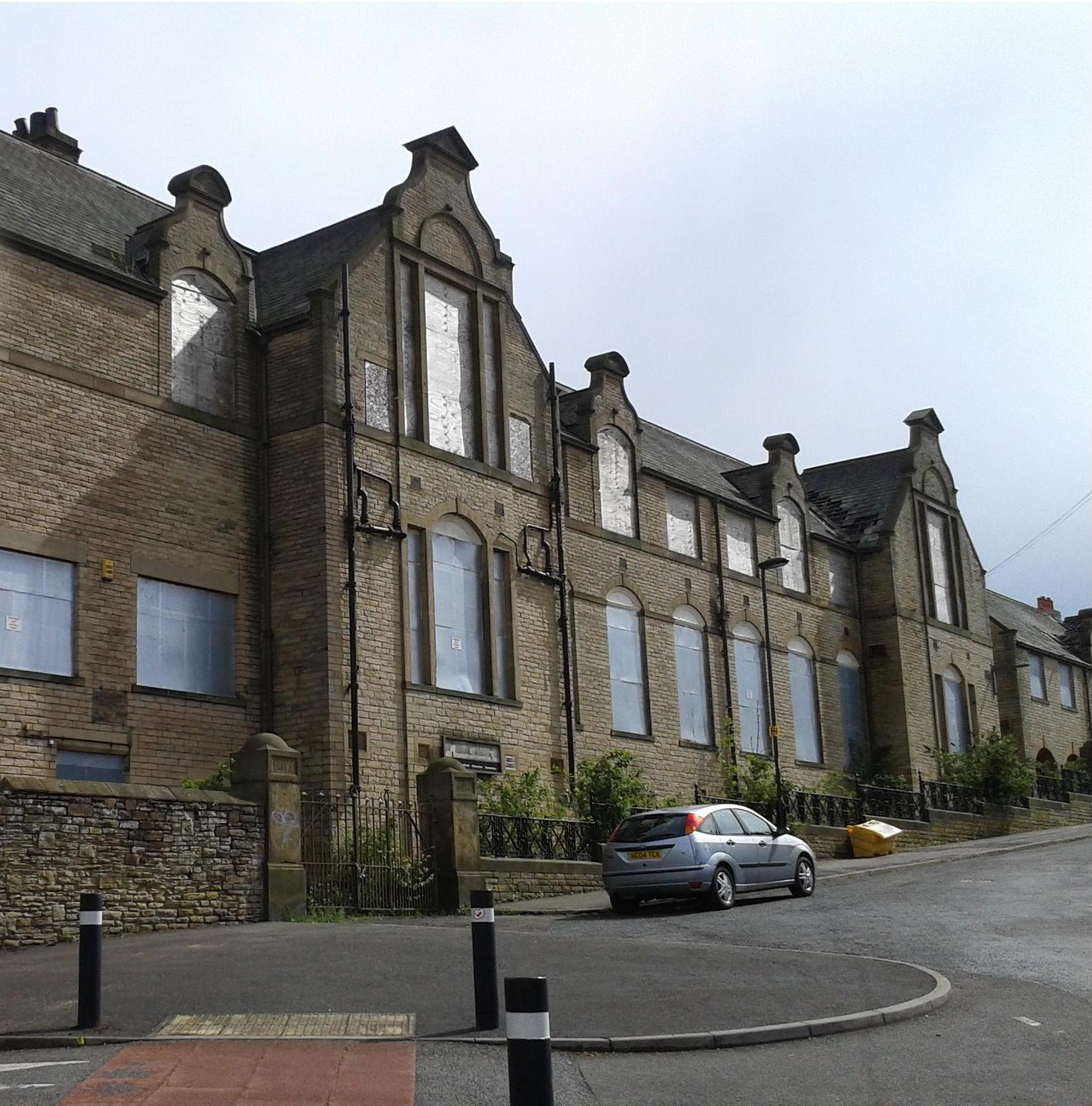
The former Heeley Bank School in 2013

She became the headteacher of the Heeley Bank School for Girls when it opened in 1880. The school was in the Heeley area of Sheffield. She soon began a correspondence course with the University of St Andrews for their Lady Literate in Arts qualification which she gained in 1888.

In 1896 her book, Needlework for Scholarship Students, was published. This was a book that could be used at Sheffield Pupil Teacher Centre where she had been a teacher of sewing from 1889.

In 1907 she began to serve on consultative committees of the national Board of Education with other suffragists like Sophie Bryant.

She was the first woman to lead the Sheffield Teachers Association and the Sheffield Headreachers Association. She went on to succeed Marshall Jackman as President of the National Union of Teachers in 1911 and she was the union's first woman member to hold the position. She brought forward a proposal that the union should support the call for women's suffrage. It was defeated as it was in 1912, 1913 and 1914.

== Death and legacy ==
Cleghorn died at her home in Sheffield. Her figure was recreated by a theatre company to explain women's suffrage and their advancement.

Trade union offices
Preceded by Marshall Jackman	President of the National Union of Teachers; 1911	Succeeded by Walter David Bentliff
