= Melissa Benn =

British journalist and writer (born 1957)

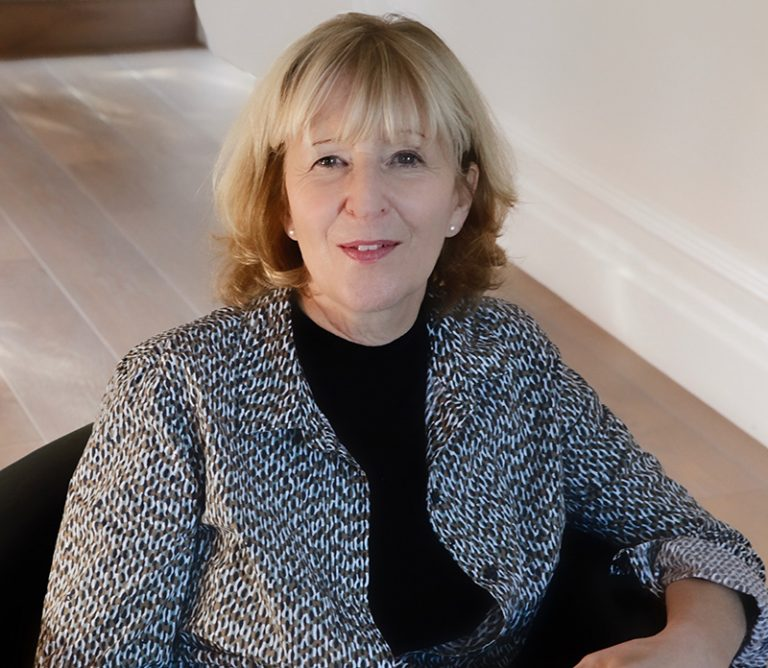
- Born: Melissa Ann Benn; 1957 (age 68–69); Hammersmith, London, England
- Education: London School of Economics
- Spouse: Paul Gordon
- Children: 2
- Parents: Tony Benn (father); Caroline DeCamp (mother)
- Relatives: Stephen Benn, 3rd Viscount Stansgate (brother); Hilary Benn (brother); Emily Benn (niece)
- Awards: Fred and Anne Jarvis Award
- Website: melissabenn.co.uk

Melissa Ann Benn (born 1957) is a British journalist and writer. She is known for her writing on a wide range of subjects, including contemporary women’s lives and feminism, and for her campaigning in support of comprehensive education. Benn set up the Local Schools Network in 2010, a pro-state schools pressure group, was Chair of Comprehensive Future from 2014-2018 and is a founder member of the Private Education Policy Forum.

She has published four books on education: A tribute to Caroline Benn: Education and Democracy; School Wars, a study of the UK's post-war comprehensive education system, The Truth About Our Schools, and Life Lessons: The Case for a National Education Service.

Benn has also written extensively on the lives of women, in a number of essays and in her two studies: Madonna and Child: Towards a New Politics of Motherhood and What Should We Tell our Daughters? The Pleasures and Pressures of Growing up Female. Benn has also authored two novels, Public Lives and One of Us.

== Career ==
Benn gained a First at the London School of Economics, where she studied history. After leaving university, Benn spent several years working at the National Council for Civil Liberties (NCCL), as an assistant to Patricia Hewitt, later Secretary of State for Health in Tony Blair's government, and then as a researcher at the Open University, under Professor Stuart Hall, working on deaths in custody. While at the NCCL, Benn co-authored Sexual Harassment at Work – the first ever publication on the subject in this country – and the Rape Controversy, an examination of laws and policies around rape. She was the researcher for the seminal study of the British Women’s Liberation Movement, Sweet Freedom, by Anna Coote and Beatrix Campbell.

Benn has worked as a freelance researcher, writer and journalist over many several decades, contributing to a number of publications including; Spare Rib, City Limits, Cosmopolitan, The Guardian, The London Review of Books, New Statesman, the Financial Times, Mslexia, Teach Secondary, and Marxism Today. Her essays on women's lives have been published in several collections, including Feminism and Censorship, Women of the Revolution: Forty Years of Feminism, an anthology of writings about women, originally published in The Guardian, New Gender Agenda, Moving Targets: Women, Murder and Representation, and The Mother in Psychoanalysis and Beyond: Matricide and maternal subjectivity. Benn has also published in The Political Quarterly, and has written about Labour's first leader Keir Hardie.

Since the early 2000s, Benn has become an advocate for comprehensive schools and a critic of many aspects of government policy on education. In 2006, with Fiona Millar, she wrote a pamphlet entitled A Comprehensive Future: Quality and Equality for All our Children, which was launched at the House of Commons in January 2006 at a meeting addressed by the former leader of the Labour Party Neil Kinnock and former Secretary of State for Education Estelle Morris.

In 2010, Benn helped form the Local Schools Network, a pro-state schools pressure group and is a founder member of the Private Education Policy Forum which undertakes detailed research into aspects of private education and policy related to it. In 2012, Benn won the Fred and Anne Jarvis Award, presented by the National Union of Teachers for her campaigning on and advocacy of comprehensive education.

In 2019, she was appointed to the Centenary Commission on Adult Education, reviewing a hundred years of adult education in Britain and making proposals for reform. In April 2023, she was appointed a member of Beyond Ofsted inquiry, Chaired by Lord Jim Knight, the inquiry set up to develop a set of principles for underpinning a better school inspection system and proposals for an alternative approach. The findings of the inquiry were published, and presented to a meeting at the House of Commons, in November 2023.

Benn has taught journalism and non-fiction writing over a number of years, including at City University and the Arvon Foundation. In 2015, she was a judge for the David Cohen Prize, awarded biennially in recognition of an individual’s lifetime achievement in literature. In 2023, she was appointed a Royal Literary Fund fellow at Lucy Cavendish College, Cambridge. She worked at the College for two years as a Fellow and for a further year as a Writing Tutor.

In 2023, Benn was invited to give the first ever Fred Jarvis Memorial lecture in which she discussed the dangers of the rise of a New Education Establishment, and their possible influence on any incoming Labour government. In 2024, she co-edited and wrote the introduction to an edited collection of her father's speeches, articles and writings, The Most Dangerous Man in Britain? The Political Writing of Tony Benn. The book was shortlisted in the biography category of the Tenth Westminster book awards. Benn was also appointed Visiting Professor in the School of Education, Language and Psychology at York St John University in 2023.

As well as Benn's books on education, she has contributed several essays to contemporary collections, including Images of Sweden 2 (on Sweden’s free school reforms), Teacher Education in Crisis: The State, the Market and the Universities in England, Beyond Belief: Why School Accountability is Broken and How to Fix It, and Unfinished Business: The Life and Legacy of Sir Tim Brighouse.

== Books ==
Benn's first book, Death in the City, co-authored with Ken Worpole, was an exploration of deaths at the hands of the police and in policy custody in London. Benn was a founder member and the first Chair of Inquest, the organisation set up to support the bereaved families following deaths involving the state.

Her first novel, Public Lives, published in 1995, was described by writer Margaret Forster as "remarkably sophisticated for a first novel". In 1998, Jonathan Cape published Benn's Madonna and Child: towards a modern politics of motherhood, which caused some controversy. The reviewers for The Guardian and The Observer criticised the book, while the Literary Review called it "a reflective, rich and rewarding investigation into the ...conditions of mothers' lives". The Guardian featured Benn as one of a number of Britain's leading feminist writers at the time.

Benn co-edited, with Clyde Chitty, A Tribute to Caroline Benn: Education and Democracy (2004), collecting various papers relevant to the campaign for comprehensive education, an issue on which her mother had been a prominent campaigner.

Her second novel, One of Us, a story of two families set against the backdrop of the 2003 invasion of Iraq, was published in 2008 receiving several positive reviews. The Independent on Sunday chose it as a 2008 Book of the Year, describing the novel as Extraordinary… an emotional and political tour de force. According to The Guardian, "Benn is wonderful on the telling details of family life... [she] has succeeded in bringing the ancient themes of Sophocles up to date with a keen eye, a subtle intelligence, and an unwavering decency". The novel was shortlisted for a British Book Award.

School Wars (2011) is an investigation of the UK's post-war comprehensive education system and was widely reviewed and discussed. Anthony Seldon, writing in The Observer, called it "a tremendous book. It is a passionate polemic about the most important policy divide of the day…[which] marks [Benn] out as one of Britain's foremost advocates of comprehensive education". In March 2012, the New Statesman publishes a dairy of Benn's own "school wars", in which he describes the experience of debating with many of her major critics in the year subsequent to publication.

The Truth About Our Schools, co-authored with Janet Downs, challenged many of the myths perpetrated during the Coalition era about the aims and achievements of comprehensive education. Benn became the Chair of Comprehensive Future in 2014, serving in this role for four years. As Chair, she played a prominent role in opposition to Prime Minister Theresa May's plans to expand grammar schools. Benn remains a Vice Chair of Comprehensive Future and sits on the Board of Forum, a journal advocating comprehensive education.

What Should We Tell Our Daughters? was published in 2013. Writing in The Independent, Sheila Rowbotham described "Benn's writing as [...] profoundly reasonable, while infused with a spirit of creative rebellion, pleasure and fun". According to the Financial Times, "Benn grapples eloquently with character, self, confidence, anger, the unquantifiable but elemental traits that make us human". In a number of debates and meetings, Benn spoke widely about the themes of the book.

In 2018, Benn published Life Lessons: The Case for a National Education Service "setting out a radical agenda for an education system that looks beyond raw results and obsession with exams".^{[1]} Angela Rayner, who was then Labour's shadow education secretary, called the book "an essential argument for an equal and fair education system, and a vital contribution to our National Education Service, one of Labour s flagship policy proposals."

In 2025, on the centenary of her father's birth, Benn co-edited and wrote the introduction to a collection of his speeches, articles and writings. Entitled The Most Dangerous Man in Britain? The Political Writing of Tony Benn, the book was shortlisted in the biography category of the Tenth Westminster book awards.

== Personal life ==
Melissa Benn was born in Hammersmith, London, to politician Tony Benn and writer-educationalist Caroline Benn. She has three brothers, Joshua Benn, Hilary Benn and Stephen Benn, 3rd Viscount Stansgate, making her a member of the political Benn family. She attended Fox Primary School and Holland Park School and graduated with a first in History from the London School of Economics. Benn's husband Paul Gordon, a notable psychotherapist and writer, died in 2024. Their two daughters were both educated at local non-selective schools, in accordance with their support for comprehensive education.

== Other publications ==
- Sexual Harassment at Work (NCCL pamphlet; 1982)
- The Rape Controversy, with Tess Gill and Anna Coote (NCCL pamphlet; second and third editions only, 1983, 1986)
- Courts and Sentencing (Children's Legal Centre pamphlet; 1987)
- A Comprehensive Future: Quality and Equality for all our Children (non-fiction; Compass, 2006)
