= Ronald Gould (trade unionist) =

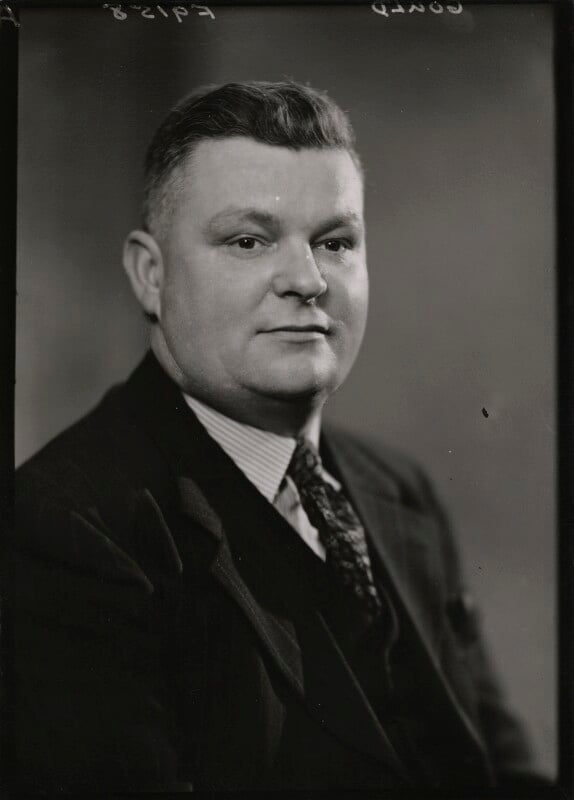
Gould in 1947

Sir Ronald Gould (9 October 1904 – 11 April 1986) was General Secretary of the National Union of Teachers in the United Kingdom from 1947–1970. He was the son of the Labour MP Frederick Gould.

== Early life ==
He was born in Midsomer Norton, Somerset. His father, Frederick Gould, was a bootmaker who was later Labour MP of nearby Frome.

His mother, Emma Gay, had been a servant to the Monckton family at Clevedon; her duties including looking after their children including the young Sir Walter Monckton. She was a descendant of the playwright John Gay. Fred and Emma were both musical: he was a baritone and she a soprano.

At the age of three-and-a-half Ronald attended the local Methodist infants' school. At seven he transferred to a local middle school. After that he attended grammar school in Shepton Mallet, before going to Westminster College, London for teacher training.

== Career ==
He completed his teacher training in 1924 and was offered a temporary teaching post at Milk Street Council School in Frome, before taking up a post at Radstock Council School, Radstock, Somerset. At the outbreak of the war in 1939, Somerset County Council appointed him as Educational Liaison Officer with responsibilities for evacuated children from London, Ilford and East Ham. He was also appointed as chairman of the local invasion committee. After becoming a teacher, he regularly attended meetings of the Radstock N.U.T. association. He was elected to the local committee and then to the Somerset County Association. He attended his first national NUT meeting in 1931. He made his first speech at the conference a few years later in Scarborough.

He became head teacher of Welton Council School (now Welton Primary School in Midsomer Norton). In 1936 he was elected to the NUT Executive. In 1942, Ernest Bevin, Minister of Labour, invited him to join a committee enquiring into the reasons for poor recruitment into coalmining. In April 1943 he was inducted as President of the NUT, a post he held for a year. By 1946 he was chairman of Radstock Urban District Council and also a magistrate. In 1947 he became General Secretary of the National Union of Teachers, a post he held until 1970. He was also the first President of the World Confederation of Organisations of the Teaching Profession. In 1955 he received his knighthood.

== Later life ==
He retired in 1970. In 1976, he published his autobiography. His wife Nellie died in 1979. He died in 1986.

== Family life ==
His wife was Nellie Denning Fish (8 March 1904 – 22 May 1979), from Radstock, daughter of Joseph Willie Fish and Rose Denning. He had two sons, Terence and Derek.

== Views and impact ==
Ronald Gould's tenure as General Secretary of the N.U.T. was at a period of immense change in UK schooling, heralded by the post-war Education reforms. The Education Act 1944 paved the way for much of this change. Gould saw the importance of "establishing equality of opportunity" via free secondary education, greater access to higher education, the virtual abolition of selection and the introduction of comprehensive schools.

The Times described his tenure as General Secretary of the National Union of Teachers as "immensely popular". Generally regarded as an effective leader, it has been suggested he was reluctant to support militancy amongst teachers, preferring to keep the membership of the union together.

Trade union offices
Preceded by W. Griffith	President of the National Union of Teachers; 1943–1944	Succeeded by G. C. T. Giles
Preceded by Sir Frederick Mander	General Secretary of National Union of Teachers; 1947-1970	Succeeded by Edward Britton
