= Paul Bach =

- Born: 13 November 1938; Forest Gate, London, England
- Died: 18 September 2011 (aged 72)
- Occupation: Magazine editor
- Years active: 1955 to 2002

Paul Bach (born Paul George Roger Bach on 13 November 1938 in Forest Gate in London – died on 18 September 2011) was a regional press journalist and editor, at one time the editor-in-chief of the Celtic Press group and group editor of the Stratford Express series of newspapers, and the founder-editor of Saga Magazine, which, under his editorship, became for a time Britain's largest-circulation monthly magazine.

== Working life ==
Straight from leaving school Bach went into journalism, working as a reporter on a local weekly newspaper. He went on to edit and work for several local and regional newspapers in various parts of England and Wales. While he was News Editor at the Merthyr Express, the newspaper won the Hannen Swaffer award in 1967 for its coverage of the Aberfan disaster of 1966.

In 1979 Bach began working for then family-owned Saga Holidays, joining the company as editor of Saga News. He transformed it into the monthly Saga Magazine, launched in 1984. As its founder-editor, he grew it within a decade into the biggest-selling monthly magazine in Britain, overtaking Reader's Digest, as its circulation grew to 1.25 million.

Bach described the magazine as general interest rather than "grey". Under his leadership, major political figures like Lord Carrington, Margaret Thatcher, Mo Mowlam and former US Senator George Mitchell were interviewed for the magazine, and Her Majesty The Queen invited it on a royal away-day. Leading writers such as Paul Lewis, Michael Parkinson, Clement Freud and Keith Waterhouse provided contributions, and celebrities such as Raquel Welch, Sir Cliff Richard, Sting, Twiggy, Pierce Brosnan, Anita Roddick, Kevin Keegan, Goldie Hawn and (controversially) Mick Jagger appeared on the cover. Under Bach the magazine was among the first to campaign for the preservation of the English village, calling on the UK government to stop the closure of rural banks and post offices.

In 2001 Bach co-edited "My Story 1: Memoirs of Everyday Life from the Readers of Saga Magazine" and "My Story 2: Further Memoirs of the 20th Century from the Readers of Saga Magazine".

Bach edited Saga Magazine until retiring in 2002.

== Personal life ==
Paul Bach attended Plaistow County Grammar School from 1950 to 1955. His father was a professor of languages at King's College, London.

A widower (his wife Florence having died some nine months previously), Bach died on 18 September 2011. He was survived by three sons.
