= Steve Sinnott =

British trade union leader

- Born: 24 June 1951; Liverpool, England, UK
- Died: 5 April 2008 (aged 56)
- Occupations: Teacher, trade union leader
- Known for: National Union of Teachers General Secretary 2004–2008

Steve Sinnott (24 June 1951 – 5 April 2008) was the General Secretary of the National Union of Teachers from 2004 until his death in 2008.

Born in Liverpool, Sinnott became deputy General Secretary of the National Union of Teachers in 1994 in the middle of his year as National President of the Union.

Sinnott was the first President of the Union to have attended a comprehensive school. He took a four-year BA in Social Sciences at Middlesex Polytechnic, graduating in 1974, and a PGCE at Edge Hill College in Ormskirk in 1975.

His first teaching post in 1975 was at Shorefields Comprehensive, Liverpool, where he taught humanities. In 1979 he moved to Broughton High School near Preston, where he became head of economics and business studies. He stayed with the school until his election as NUT Deputy General Secretary in November 1994.

Sinnott was an outspoken critic of both teaching salaries and the British Government's City academies, and in his role as General Secretary of the Union, he was to have led the first national teachers strike in the UK since 1987, over the issue of pay. Following his death from a heart attack, the Union said that the strike would still go ahead.

A UK charity, The Steve Sinnott Foundation, was established in 2009 by Sinnott's wife and three of his former colleagues. It works to promote the achievement of the Millennium Development Goals for education.

Trade union offices
Preceded by Marian Darke	President of the National Union of Teachers; 1994	Succeeded by J. Bills
Preceded by Mary Hufford	Deputy General Secretary of the National Union of Teachers; 1994–2005	Succeeded by Christine Blower
Preceded by Doug McAvoy	General Secretary of National Union of Teachers; 2004–2008	Succeeded by Christine Blower
