= School Teachers Opposed to Performance Pay =

British organisation of teachers

School Teachers Opposed to Performance Pay (STOPP) was launched in the UK by teachers in the National Union of Teachers in 1999 in response to the introduction of performance management and the "threshold". It organised a number of protest events, including a march and rally in London in February 2000.

The National Union of Teachers from its inception has opposed performance-related pay.

In 2006, the organisation became active again when the government of the UK proposed to use performance management in schools as a way of promoting performance related pay.
