= Sophie Bryant =

Irish mathematician (1850–1922)

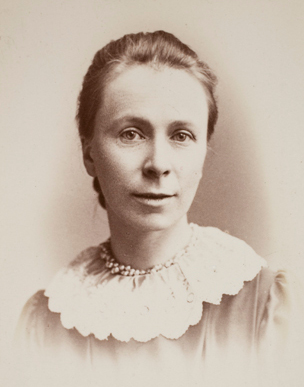
- Sophie Bryant
- Born: 15 February 1850; Sandymount, Dublin, United Kingdom of Great Britain and Ireland
- Died: 14 August 1922 (aged 72); Chamonix, France
- Occupations: Mathematician and educator

Sophie Willock Bryant (15 February 1850 – 14 August 1922) was an Anglo-Irish mathematician, educator, feminist and activist. She was the first woman to receive a DSc in England; one of the first to serve on a Royal Commission and on the Senate of the University of London.

== Early life and education ==
Bryant was born Sophie Willock in Dublin in 1850. Her father was Revd Dr William Willock DD, Fellow and Tutor of Trinity College, Dublin. She was educated at home, largely by her father. As a teenager she moved to London, when her father was appointed Professor of Geometry at the University of London in 1863, and she attended Bedford College. At the age of nineteen she married Dr William Hicks Bryant, a surgeon ten years older than she was, who died of cirrhosis within a year.

== Career ==
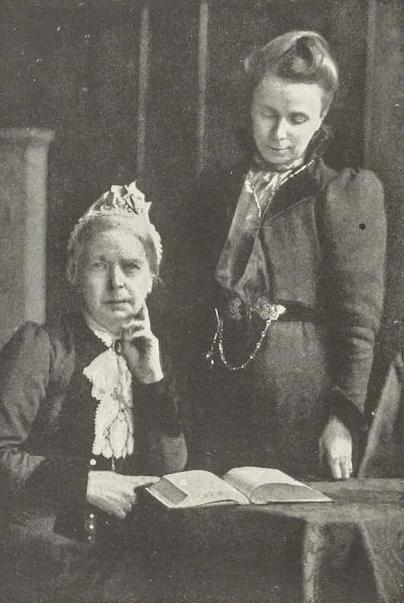
Frances Mary Buss and Sophie Bryant

In 1875 Bryant became a teacher and was invited by Frances Mary Buss to join the staff of North London Collegiate School. In 1895 she succeeded Miss Buss as headmistress of North London Collegiate, serving until 1918.

When the University of London opened its degree courses to women in 1878, she started attending. In 1881, she became one of the first women to obtain a First Class Honours degree, in her case a BSc, in the first year that a British university awarded degrees to women. This was in Mental and Moral Sciences (Philosophy). She was awarded second class honours in mathematics. In 1884, she was awarded the degree of Doctor of Science in Mental and Moral Sciences. In 1882 she was the third woman to be elected to the London Mathematical Society, and was the first active female member, publishing her first paper with the Society in 1884. Together with Charles Smith, Bryant edited three volumes of Euclid's Elements of Geometry, for the use of schools (Euclid's Elements of Geometry, books I and II (1897); Euclid's Elements of Geometry, books III and IV (1899); Euclid's Elements of Geometry, books VI and IX (1901)).

Sophie Bryant was a pioneer in education for women. She was the first woman to receive a DSc in England; one of the first three women to be appointed to a Royal Commission, the Bryce commission on Secondary Education in 1894–1895; and one of the first three women to be appointed to the Senate of the University of London. When Trinity College Dublin opened its degrees to women, Bryant was one of the first to be awarded an honorary doctorate. She was also instrumental in setting up the Cambridge Training College for Women, now Hughes Hall, Cambridge. She is also said to have been one of the first women to own a bicycle.

While in London, she was a member of the London Ethical Society, an early humanist community which advocated moral living independent of religion. She was interested in Irish politics, wrote books on Irish history and ancient Irish law (Celtic Ireland (1889), The Genius of the Gael (1913)), and was an ardent Irish nationalist from a Protestant family background. She was president of the Irish National Literary Society in 1914. She supported women's suffrage but advocated postponement until women were better educated. She serve on consultative committees of the national Board of Education with other suffragists like Isabel Cleghorn.

== Later life and death ==
Bryant loved physical activity and the outdoors. She rowed, cycled, and swam, and twice climbed the Matterhorn. She died in a hiking accident in the Alps in 1922, aged 72.
