= Doug McAvoy =

British trade union leader (1939–2019)

Doug McAvoy (2 January 1939 – 12 May 2019) was a British trade union leader. He was General Secretary of the National Union of Teachers from 1989 to 2004.

A teacher, McAvoy was secretary of Newcastle-upon-Tyne NUT and became a member of the National Executive of the Union in 1970. He was appointed Deputy General-Secretary designate in 1974, a post he held until 1989, when he became the first directly elected General Secretary.

Trade union offices
Preceded by Fred Jarvis	Deputy General Secretary of the National Union of Teachers; 1974–1989	Succeeded by Mary Hufford
Preceded by Fred Jarvis	General Secretary of the National Union of Teachers; 1989–2004	Succeeded by Steve Sinnott
