= National Education Union =

UK trade union

- Founded: 1 September 2017; 8 years ago
- Members: 487,420 (2024)
- General Secretary: Daniel Kebede
- Affiliations: TUC
- Website: neu.org.uk

The National Education Union (NEU) is a trade union in the United Kingdom for school teachers, further education lecturers, education support staff and teaching assistants.

== Governance and administration ==
The NEU came into being on 1 September 2017. At that time a Joint Executive Council was formed with the existing structures of the NUT and ATL continuing to function as sections of the new union. Full amalgamation took place on 1 January 2019 and a new Executive Committee was elected.

The existing general secretaries of the NUT and ATL, Kevin Courtney and Mary Bousted, served as joint general secretaries of the new union until March 2023, when Daniel Kebede was elected as a single general secretary.

== History ==
=== National Union of Teachers ===
The NUT was established at a meeting at King's College London on 25 June 1870 as the National Union of Elementary Teachers (NUET) to represent all school teachers in England and Wales, combining a number of local teacher associations which had formed across the country following the Elementary Education Act 1870 (33 & 34 Vict. c. 75). After toying with the idea of changing the name to the National Union of English Teachers, the name National Union of Teachers (NUT) was finally adopted at Annual Conference in April 1889.

=== Association of Teachers and Lecturers ===
The origins of ATL go back to 1884 when 180 women met to create the Association of Assistant Mistresses (AAM). These women worked in schools founded for higher education of girls. Their concern was primarily for the pupils. However, in 1921, the AAM appointed representatives to the newly formed Burnham Committee on Salaries in Secondary Schools

The Association of Assistant Masters in Secondary Schools (AMA) was formed in 1891. Its purpose was to protect and improve the conditions of service of secondary teachers. Between 1899 and 1908 it played an influential part in obtaining security of tenure for assistant teachers through the Endowed Schools Act.

In 1978 AAM and AMA merged to form the Assistant Masters and Mistresses Association (AMMA), with a membership of approximately 75,000. The name was changed in 1993 to the Association of Teachers and Lecturers (ATL).

=== National Education Union ===
The NUT and ATL agreed to pursue a merger during their Special conferences held on 5 November 2016. A ballot of members of both unions took place between 27 February and 21 March 2017. The results were announced the following day and resulted in 97% of NUT members and 73% of ATL members who returned their ballot papers supporting the merger proposals.

With 445,601 members as of 2022, it is the largest education union in the UK and Europe.

In 2024 the membership was 487,420.

== Logo and corporate identity ==
A logo for the new union was launched on 30 June 2017. The logo features a starburst of pentagons with the name of the union written at the centre. Despite being a proper noun, the name is stylised in the logo in all lower case letters as "national education union" rather than "National Education Union". The union uses the strapline "together we'll shape the future of education".

== Fred and Anne Jarvis Award ==
Named after former NUT General Secretary Fred Jarvis (who died in 2020) and his wife Anne (who died in 2007), the Fred and Anne Jarvis Award was established by the NUT in 2007 and presented annually, originally to individuals other than NUT members who campaigned for all children and young people. From 2019 the award has been presented by the NEU.

== Leadership ==
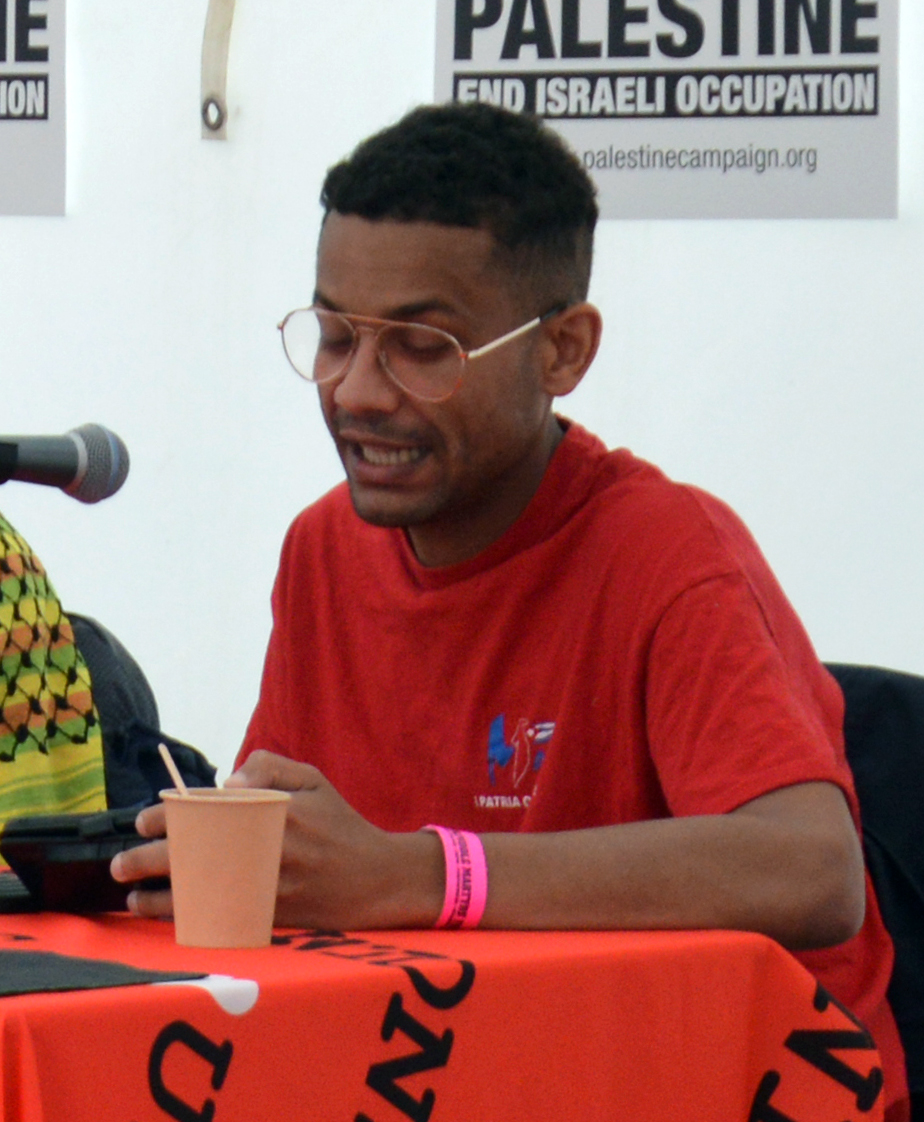
General secretary Daniel Kebede

=== General Secretaries ===
2017: Mary Bousted and Kevin Courtney
2023: Daniel Kebede

== See also ==
- Education in the United Kingdom
- Teachers' trade unions in the United Kingdom
