= National Union of Teachers =

Former trade union for school teachers (1870–2017)

- National Union of Teachers
- Merged into: National Education Union
- Founded: 1870
- Dissolved: 1 September 2017
- Headquarters: London, WC1; United Kingdom
- Location(s): England Wales Channel Islands Isle of Man
- Members: 372,136 (2015)
- Key people: Kevin Courtney, General Secretary; Philipa Harvey, President
- Affiliations: TUC, EI
- Website: www.teachers.org.uk

The National Union of Teachers (NUT; /ˈnʌt/) was a trade union for school teachers in England, Wales, the Channel Islands and the Isle of Man. It was a member of the Trades Union Congress. In March 2017, NUT members endorsed a proposed merger with the Association of Teachers and Lecturers to form a new union known as the National Education Union, which came into existence on 1 September 2017. The union recruited only qualified teachers and those training to be qualified teachers into membership and on dissolution had almost 400,000 members, making it the largest teachers' union in the United Kingdom.

== Campaigns ==
The NUT campaigned on educational issues and working conditions for its members. Among the NUT's policies in 2017 were:

- Fair pay for teachers
- Work-life balance for teachers
- Against academies
- Abolition of National Curriculum Tests (SATs)
- One union for all teachers

The NUT offered legal protection to its members. The NUT established two financial services companies for teachers, Teachers Assurance in 1877 and the Teachers Building Society in 1966.

== History ==
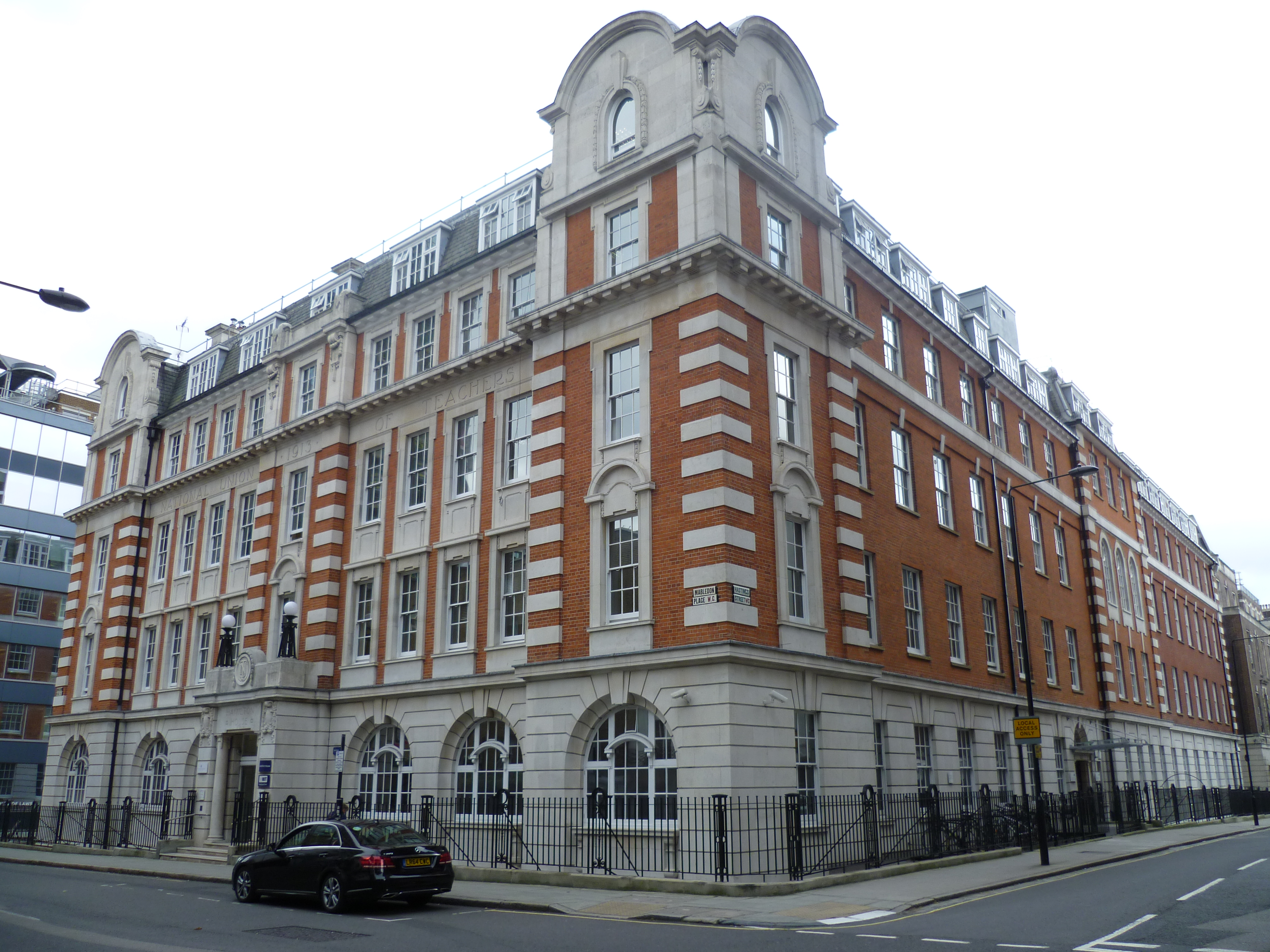
Headquarters of the NUT at Hamilton House

The NUT was established at a meeting at King's College London on 25 June 1870 as the National Union of Elementary Teachers (NUET) to represent all school teachers in England and Wales combining a number of local teacher associations which had formed across the country following the Elementary Education Act 1870 (33 & 34 Vict. c. 75). After toying with the idea of changing the name to the National Union of English Teachers, the name National Union of Teachers (NUT) was finally adopted at Annual Conference in April 1889.

In 1919, in response to an NUT referendum approving the principle of equal pay, a ginger group, the National Association of Men Teachers (NAMT), was formed within the NUT to further the interests of male teachers. The NAMT changed its name in 1920 to the National Association of Schoolmasters (NAS) and seceded finally from the NUT in 1922. The secession came about indirectly following a decision at the NAS Conference that year to prohibit NAS members from continuing to also be members of the NUT after the 31 December 1922. The NAS is now amalgamated into the NASUWT, the second-largest teaching union in the UK.

The NUT first established its offices at 7 Adam Street, Adelphi, London WC on the appointment of the first full-time Secretary in 1873. In 1889 it moved its headquarters to Bolton House, 67/71 Russell Square, London WC. In 1915, it moved its headquarters to Hamilton House, Mabledon Place, London WC1H 9BD, where it has remained ever since, except during the Second World War, when the NUT rented Toddington Manor, Gloucestershire in order to avoid air raids.

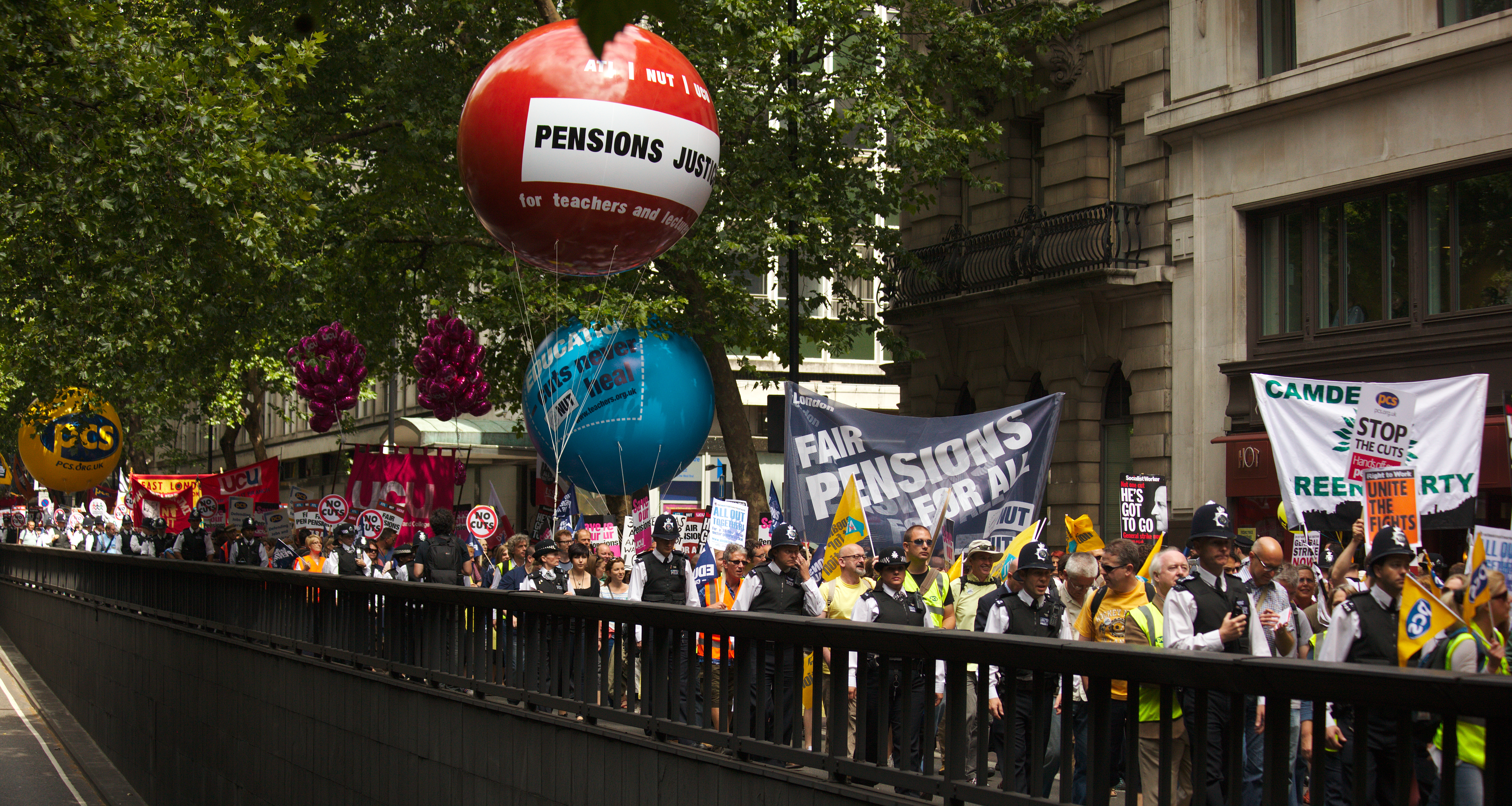
Striking teachers and public sector workers march down the Kingsway, London, flanked by police on 30 June, as part of the 2011 United Kingdom anti-austerity protests.

== Leadership ==
=== General Secretaries ===
The General Secretary was the leader of the NUT. From 1989, the General Secretary was elected by the union's membership, with each term lasting five years.

- William Lawson, 1870–1873
- Thomas Heller, 1873–1891
- James Yoxall, 1892–1924
- Frank Goldstone, 1924–1931
- Frederick Mander, 1931–1947
- Ronald Gould, 1947–1970
- Edward Britton, 1970–1975
- Fred Jarvis, 1975–1989
- Doug McAvoy, 1989–2004
- Steve Sinnott, 2004–2008 (died in office)
- Christine Blower, 2008–2016 (acting until May 2009)
- Kevin Courtney, 2016–2017

=== Deputy General Secretaries ===
1960s: Ernest Naisbitt
1970: Fred Jarvis
1974: Doug McAvoy
c.1989: Mary Hufford
1994: Steve Sinnott
2005: Christine Blower
2010: Kevin Courtney
2016: Post vacant

=== Presidents ===
1870: John James Graves
1871: J. Langton
1872: W. Osborn
1873: T. Smith
1874: H. J. Moore
1875: J. H. Devonshire
1876: G. Seldon
1877: W. Gardner
1878: T. N. Day
1879: J. W. Grove
1880: G. J. Rankilor
1881: J. R. Langler
1882: R. Sykes
1883: C. J. Dawson
1884: R. Greenwood
1885: R. Wild
1886: A. Trail
1887: G. Girling
1888: W. J. Pope
1889: R. Wild
1890: H. J. Walker
1891: G. Collins
1892: James Yoxall
1893: Charles Bowden
1894: Ernest Gray
1895: T. B. Ellery
1896: Thomas Macnamara
1897: C. J. Addiscott
1898: Richard Waddington
1899: Thomas Clancy
1900: Marshall Jackman
1901: James Blacker
1902: Allen Croft
1903: H. Coward
1904: George Sharples
1905: Tom John
1906: T. P. Sykes
1907: A. R. Pickles
1908: W. A. Nicholls
1909: C. W. Hole
1910: Marshall Jackman
1911: Isabel Cleghorn
1912: Walter David Bentliff
1913: A. W. Dakers
1914: William Bridgland Steer
1915: William Bridgland Steer
1916: Charles Williamson Crook
1917: Thomas Underdown
1918: Essie Conway
1919: W. P. Folland
1920: J. F. Wood
1921: G. H. Powell
1922: William Cove
1923: E. J. Sainsbury
1924: M. Conway
1925: C. T. Wing
1926: Fred Barraclough
1927: Frederick Mander
1928: William Willis Hill
1929: C. W. Cowen
1930: Leah Manning
1931: Angus Roberts
1932: A. E. Henshall
1933: H. N. Penlington
1934: H. Humphrey
1935: J. W. H. Brown
1936: D. Edwards
1937: R. J. Patten
1938: Elsie Vera Parker
1939: George Chipperfield
1940: George Chipperfield
1941: George Chipperfield
1942: W. Griffith
1943: Ronald Gould
1944: GCT Giles
1945: Isabel Haswell
1946: Ralph Morley
1947: J. W. Lawton
1948: William J. Rodda
1949: Gwynne Rees
1950: Sophie Christie Bertie
1951: A. Granville Prior
1952: C. A. Roberts
1953: O. Barnett
1954: F. J. Evans
1955: Herbert J. Nursery
1956: Edward Britton
1957: John Archbold
1958: E. S. Owen
1959: A. F. Cooke
1960: S. W. Exworthy
1961: G. A. Chappell
1962: John England
1963: Harry Dawson
1964: Muriel Stewart
1965: Edward Homer
1966: Oliver Whitfield
1967: D. G. Gilbert
1968: W. E. Davies
1969: C. B. Johnson
1970: C. W. Elliot
1971: J. T. Jones
1972: H. Allison
1973: Max Morris
1974: J. Caulfield
1975: E. Clayton
1976: A. Wilshire
1977: J. Gray
1978: D. G. Bonner
1979: J. Murphy
1980: P. Kennedy
1981: J. Chambers
1982: A. Budd
1983: D. Winters
1984: Peter Griffin
1985: W. Green
1986: R. Richardson
1987: D. Morgan
1988: M. Horne
1989: June Fisher
1990: Barbara Lloyd
1991: Anne Moran
1992: Pat Hawkes
1993: Marian Darke
1994: Steve Sinnott
1995: J. Bills
1996: Carole Regan
1997: Christine Blower
1998: Maureen Skevington
1999: Judith Elderkin
2000: Tony Brockman
2001: John Illingworth
2002: Kathryn Stallard
2003: Lesley Auger
2004: Mary Compton
2005: Hilary Bills
2006: Judy Moorhouse
2007: Baljeet Ghale
2008: Bill Greenshields
2009: Martin Reed
2010: Gill Goodswen
2011: Nina Franklin
2012: Marilyn Harrop
2013: Beth Davies
2014: Max Hyde
2015: Philipa Harvey
2016: Anne Swift

== Annual Conference ==
The NUT annual conference took place every spring. The timing always coincided with Easter weekend: starting on Good Friday and ending on Easter Tuesday and took place in various locations. The last NUT Conference was held in Cardiff in 2017. Following the NUT amalgamation with the Association of Teachers and Lecturers on 1 September 2017 there will be a National Education Union - NUT Section held in Brighton in 2018.

== Fred and Anne Jarvis Award ==
Named after former General Secretary Fred Jarvis and his late wife, the Fred and Anne Jarvis Award was established in 2007 and was presented annually by the NUT to individuals other than NUT members who campaigned tirelessly for all children and young people. For a list of winners of the Fred and Anne Jarvis Award see List of Fred and Anne Jarvis Award winners.

== See also ==
- National Association of Schoolmasters Union of Women Teachers
- Association of Teachers and Lecturers
- Education in the United Kingdom
