= History of the trust movement in Scotland =

The enterprise trust movement in Scotland encourages entrepreneurial activity throughout Scotland with the aim of developing, support and fostering growth of small to medium-sized enterprises (SME's).

In Scotland, the Enterprise Trust model was originally established in the early 1980s in an environment when the Scottish economy was undergoing significant change. Traditional industries such as coal mining, steel, shipbuilding and heavy engineering were all in decline. This period of economic transition impacted significantly on communities across Scotland and in response, enterprise trusts were established as locally led initiatives to support the regeneration of these communities through focusing on small businesses.

Trusts have as their core activity the goal of encouraging and supporting entrepreneurial activity, helping to create successful new businesses and supporting the development and growth of small to medium-sized enterprises (SMEs) generally employing up to 25 people. The involvement of the private sector on trust boards was a new concept at the time and designed to provide a mix of knowledge and experience in the design and operation of business support programmes. It has been recognised that SME's are an engine of innovation in the new economy and they are;

- the biggest creators of new jobs
- better at moving people into employment from unemployment
- employ more disabled people, females and older people
- offer more flexible employment
- treat people more fairly

By the end of the 1990s there were over 40 trusts operating across Scotland all delivering a range of business creation and support contracts in their respective local areas. However, from 2000 onwards there was a gradual consolidation in the sector with many smaller trusts merging to form more regionally based operations. At the same time, some trusts moved away from business support and development contracts and into other complementary business areas, although still retaining their core ethos of support to new business creation and development.

Scottish Liberal Democrat deputy head Jo Swinson has praised the benefits of such Scottish Enterprises as East Dunbartonshire for the assistance they have provided in fostering local businesses. Regeneration throughout Scotland has also been further assisted by agencies such as the Scottish Government export agency Scottish Development International (SDI), run by the Scottish government, Scottish Enterprise and Highlands and Islands Enterprise who have helped 900 Scottish businesses to internationalise.

The Enterprise Trusts are run as not-for-profit organisations with any surpluses generated re-invested in the provision of services for the benefit of customers.

== Similar services ==
The United Kingdom offer other regional services:

- Business Link
- nibusinessinfo, Northern Ireland (run by Invest Northern Ireland)
- Flexible Support for Business, Wales.
