= Higher apprenticeship =

Vocational training

A Higher Apprenticeship is the vocational equivalent to a Foundation University degree. This programme will deliver a level 4-5 qualification and can only be undertaken if a level 3 equivalent has already been achieved. However, more recently a number of Training Providers that offer higher apprenticeships do not always require these qualifications. Relevant experience could lead to an interview with the training provider before being accepted onto the programme.

Higher apprenticeships now account for 31.9% of all apprenticeship starts, with 80,700 new starters on the higher apprenticeship during 2020/21. The higher apprenticeship is the only apprenticeship to have grown over the last three years, moving from 59,800 new starts in 2018/19 and 66,700 in 2019/20 to the current level of over 80,000 over the last 12 months.

== Requirements ==
Higher apprenticeships have been designed for learners 18 years of age or older.

Candidates interested in this programme must already have a level 3 qualification such as an advanced apprenticeship, A levels or an International Baccalaureate. However, some training providers will offer the programme if you have relevant experience.

== Frameworks ==
Higher Apprenticeships are now available in over 40 job areas.

== See also ==
- National Apprenticeship Service
- Apprenticeship Levy
- Degree apprenticeship
- Apprenticeships in the United Kingdom
