= Apprenticeships in the United Kingdom =

Apprenticeships have a long tradition in the United Kingdom, dating back to around the 12th century. They were flourishing by the 14th century and were the major form of training in manufacturing and services in the sixteenth to eighteenth centuries. Apprenticeship declined during the Industrial Revolution as large firms and factories emerged, offering other ways to gain skills and more jobs were semi-skilled. They remained important in many occupations, however, throughout the 19th and 20th centuries. In modern times, apprenticeships were formalised in 1964 by act of parliament and they continue to be in widespread use to this day.

== Background ==
An apprenticeship is a system for training a new generation of practitioners of a trade or profession with on-the-job training and often some accompanying study (classroom work and reading). Apprenticeships can also enable practitioners to gain a licence to practise in a regulated profession. Most of their training is done while working for an employer who helps the apprentices learn their trade or profession, in exchange for their continued labour for an agreed period after they have achieved measurable competencies.

== History ==
=== Early history ===
Apprenticeships have a long tradition in the United Kingdom, dating back to around the 12th century and flourishing by the 14th century. During the sixteenth and seventeenth century, a large share of training in towns took place in London: almost 80% of urban apprentices in England would be found in the city, having travelled from across the nation. The parents or guardians of a minor would agree with a master craftsman or tradesman the conditions for an apprenticeship. This contract would then bind the youth for 5–9 years (e.g., from age 14 to 21). Apprentices' families would sometimes pay a "premium" or fee to the craftsman and the contract would usually be recorded in a written indenture.

In towns and cities with guilds, apprenticeship would often be subject to guild or city regulation, setting minimum terms of service, or limiting the number of apprentices that a master could train at any one time. The most important source of oversight of apprenticeship contracts was through the courts operated by towns or cities, such as the Lord Mayor's Court of London, which heard large numbers of disputes each year. Elsewhere, Justices of the Peace could judge disputes. Guilds also often kept records of who became an apprentice, and this would often provide a qualification for later becoming a freeman of a guild or a citizen of a city. Many youths would train in villages or communities that lacked guilds, however, so avoiding the impact of these regulations.

In the 16th century, the payment of a "premium" to the master was not at all common, but such fees became relatively common by the end of the 17th century, though they varied greatly from trade to trade. The payment of a one-off fee could be very difficult for some parents, limiting who was able to undertake apprenticeships. In the 18th-century, apprenticeship premiums were taxed, and the registers of the Stamp Duty that recorded tax payments mostly survive, showing that roughly one in ten teenage males served an apprenticeship for which they paid fees, and that the majority paid five to ten pounds to their master.

In theory no wage had to be paid to an apprentice since the technical training was provided in return for the labour given, and wages were illegal in some cities, such as London. However, it was usual to pay small sums to apprentices, sometimes with which to buy, or instead of, new clothes. By the 18th century regular payments, at least in the last two or three years of the apprentice's term, became usual and those who lived apart from their masters were frequently paid a regular wage. This was sometimes called the "half-pay" system or "colting", payments being made weekly or monthly to the apprentice or to his parents. In these cases, the apprentice often went home from Saturday night to Monday morning. This was the norm in the 19th century but this system had existed in some trades since the 16th century.

In 1563, the Statute of Artificers and Apprentices was passed to regulate work and wages in England. It aimed to prevent workers leaving agriculture and included rules limiting access to apprenticeship system, as well as famously forbidding anyone from practising a trade or craft without first serving a 7-year period as an apprentice to a master. In practice, the sons of artisans might qualify by working with their father outside a formal contract, but the law remained unclear on this and many did enter indentures.

From 1601, 'parish' apprenticeships under the Elizabethan Poor Law came to be used as a way of providing for poor, illegitimate and orphaned children of both sexes alongside the regular system of skilled apprenticeships, which tended to provide for boys from slightly more affluent backgrounds. These parish apprenticeships, which could be created with the assent of two Justices of the Peace, supplied apprentices for occupations of lower status such as farm labouring, brickmaking and menial household service.

=== Nineteenth century ===
In the early years of the Industrial Revolution entrepreneurs began to resist the restrictions of the apprenticeship system, and a legal ruling established that the Statute of Apprentices did not apply to trades that were not in existence when it was passed in 1563, thus excluding many new 18th century industries. In 1814 the requirement that a free worker in a skilled trade needed to have served an apprenticeship was abolished. However with the abolition of slavery, the Slavery Abolition Act 1833 established an apprenticeship system whereby formerly enslaved Africans where obliged to work three quarters of their time for their former owners, This was reckoned at 40½ hours per week. (The full week of 54 hours comprised five full days of 8 hours per day, with Saturday a half-day and Sunday off.)

By the end of the century, in the railway industry an ordinary apprenticeship involved a fee, with a higher fee required for a 'premium apprenticeship'. This offered greater breadth and depth of education for trainees aiming eventually at the higher grades.

=== System introduced in 1964 ===
The mainstay of training in industry has been the apprenticeship system (combining academic and practice), and the main concern has been to avoid skill shortages in traditionally skilled occupations and higher technician and engineering professionals, e.g., through the UK Industry Training Boards (ITBs) set up under the 1964 Act. The aims were to ensure an adequate supply of training at all levels; to improve the quality and quantity of training; and to share the costs of training among employers. The ITBs were empowered to publish training recommendations, which contained full details of the tasks to be learned, the syllabus to be followed, the standards to be reached and vocational courses to be followed. These were often accompanied by training manuals, which were in effect practitioners' guides to apprentice training, and some ITBs provide training in their own centres. The ITBs did much to formalise what could have been a haphazard training experience and greatly improved its quality. The years from the mid-1960s to the mid-1970s saw the highest levels of apprentice recruitment, yet even so, out of a school leaving cohort of about 750,000, only about 110,000 (mostly boys) became apprentices. The apprenticeship system aimed at highly developed craft and higher technician skills for an elite minority of the workforce, the majority of whom were trained in industries that declined rapidly from 1973 onwards, and by the 1980s it was clear that in manufacturing this decline was permanent.

Since the 1950s, the UK high technology industry (Aerospace, Nuclear, Oil & Gas, Automotive, Telecommunications, Power Generation and Distribution etc.) trained its higher technicians and professional engineers via the traditional indentured apprenticeship system of learning – usually a 4–6 year process from age 16–21. There were 4 types of traditional apprenticeship: craft, technician, higher technician, and graduate. Craft, technician and higher technician apprenticeships usually took 4 to 5 years while a graduate apprenticeship was a short 2-year experience usually while at university or post graduate experience. Non-graduate technician apprenticeships were often referred to as "technical apprenticeships". The traditional apprenticeship framework in the 1950s, 1960s and 1970s was designed to allow young people (from 16 years old) an alternative path to A Levels to achieve both an academic qualification (equivalent to today's level 4 or 5 NVQs) and competency-based skills for knowledge work. Often referred to as the "Golden Age" of work and employment for bright young people, the traditional technical apprenticeship framework was open to young people who had a minimum of 4 GCE O-Levels to enroll in an Ordinary National Certificate or Diploma (ONC, OND) or a City & Guilds engineering technician course. Apprentices could progress to the Higher National Certificate, Higher National Diploma (HNC, HND) or advanced City and Guilds course such as Full Technological Certification. Apprenticeship positions at elite companies often had hundreds of applications for a placement. Academic learning during an apprenticeship was achieved either via block release or day release at a local technical institute. An OND or HND was usually obtained via the block release approach whereby an apprentice would be released for periods of up to 3 months to study academic courses full-time and then return to the employer for applied work experience. For entrance into the higher technical engineering apprenticeships, GCE O-Levels had to include Mathematics, Physics, and English language. The academic level of subjects such as mathematics, physics, chemistry on ONC/OND, and some City & Guilds advanced technician courses, was equivalent to A level mathematics, physics and chemistry. The academic science subjects were based on applied science in subjects such as thermodynamics, fluid mechanics, mechanics of machines, dynamics and statics, electrical science and electronics. These are often referred to as the engineering sciences. HNC and HND were broadly equivalent to subjects in the first year of a bachelor's degree in engineering but not studied to the same intensity or mathematical depth. HNC was accepted as entrance into the first year of an engineering degree and high performance on an HND course could allow a student direct entry into the second year of a degree. Few apprentices followed this path since it would have meant 10–12 years in further and higher education. For the few that did follow this path they accomplished a solid foundation of competency-based work training via apprenticeship and attained a higher academic qualification at a university or Polytechnic combining both forms of education; vocational plus academic. During the 1970s, City and Guilds assumed responsibility for the administration of HNC and HND courses.

The City and Guilds of London Institute the forerunner of Imperial College engineering school has been offering vocational education through apprenticeships since the 1870s from basic craft skills (mechanic, hairdresser, chef, plumbing, carpentry, bricklaying, etc.) all the way up to qualifications equivalent to university master's degrees and doctorates. The City and Guilds diploma of fellowship is awarded to individuals who are nationally recognised through peer review as having achieved the very highest level in competency-based achievement. The first award of FCGI was approved by Council in December 1892 and awarded in 1893 to Mr H A Humphrey, Engineering Manager of the Refined Bicarbonate and Crystal Plant Departments of Brunner, Mond & Co. His award was for material improvements in the manufacture of bicarbonate of soda. The system of nomination was administered within Imperial College, with recommendations being passed to the Council of the Institute for approval. About 500–600 people have been awarded Fellowship.

== Traditional framework ==
The traditional apprenticeship framework's purpose was to provide a supply of young people seeking to enter work-based learning via apprenticeships by offering structured high-value learning and transferable skills and knowledge. Apprenticeship training was enabled by linking industry with local technical colleges and professional engineering institutions. The apprenticeship framework offered a clear pathway and competency outcomes that addressed the issues facing the industry sector and specific companies. This system was in place since the 1950s. The system provided young people with an alternative to staying in full-time education post- 16/18 to gain purely academic qualifications without work-based learning. The apprenticeship system of the 1950s, 1960s and 1970s provided the necessary preparation for young people to qualify as a Craft trade (Machinist, Toolmaker, Fitter, Plumber, Welder, Mechanic, Millwright etc.), or Technician (quality inspector, draughtsman, designer, planner, work study, programmer), or Technician Engineer (tool design, product design, methods, stress and structural analysis, machine design etc.) and enabled a path to a fully qualified Chartered Engineer in a specific discipline (Mechanical, Electrical, Civil, Aeronautical, Chemical, Building, Structural, Manufacturing etc.). The Chartered Engineer qualification was usually achieved aged 28 and above. Apprentices undertook a variety of job roles in numerous shop floor and office technical functions to assist the work of master craftsmen, technicians, engineers, and managers in the design, development, manufacture and maintenance of products and production systems.

It was possible for apprentices to progress from national certificates and diplomas to engineering degrees if they had the aptitude. The system allowed young people to find their level and still achieve milestones along the path from apprenticeship into higher education via a polytechnic or university. Though rare, it was possible for an apprentice to advance from vocational studies, to undergraduate degree, to graduate study and earn a master's degree or a PhD. The system was effective; industry was assured of a supply of practically educated and work-skilled staff, local technical colleges offered industry relevant courses that had a high measure of academic content and an apprentice was prepared for professional life or higher education by the age of 21. With the exception of advanced technology companies particularly in aerospace (BAE systems, Rolls-Royce, Bombardier) this system declined with the decline of general manufacturing industry in the UK.

Traditional apprenticeships reached their lowest point in the 1980s: by that time, training programmes declined. The exception to this was in the high technology engineering areas of aerospace, chemicals, nuclear, automotive, power and energy systems where apprentices continued to serve the structured four- to five-year programmes of both practical and academic study to qualify as engineering technician or Incorporate Engineer (engineering technologist) and go on to earn a master of engineering degree and qualify as a Chartered Engineer (UK); the UK gold standard engineering qualification. Engineering technicians and technologists undertook combined theory and practice typically for example at a technical college for one day and two evenings per week on a City & Guilds programme or Ordinary National Certificate / Higher National Certificate course. Becoming a chartered engineer via the apprenticeship route normally involved 10 – 12 years of academic and vocational training at a combination of an employer, college of further education and/or university. In 1986 National Vocational Qualifications (NVQs) commenced to stem a great fall in vocational training. By 1990, apprenticeship had reached an approximate low, at 2/3 of 1% of total employment.

=== Revitalisation from 1990s onward ===
In 1994, the UK Government introduced Modern Apprenticeships (renamed Apprenticeships in England, Wales and Northern Ireland), based on frameworks today of the Sector Skills Councils. In 2009, the National Apprenticeship Service was founded to coordinate apprenticeships in England. Apprenticeship frameworks contain a number of separately certified elements:

- a knowledge-based element, typically certified through a qualification known as a 'Technical Certificate' (not mandatory in the Scottish Modern Apprenticeship);
- a competence-based element, typically certified through an NVQ (in Scotland this can be through an SVQ or an alternative competence-based qualification);
- Functional Skills which are in all cases minimum levels of Mathematics and English attainment and in some cases additionally IT (in Scotland, Core Skills); and
- Employment Rights and Responsibilities (ERR) to show that the Apprentice has had a full induction to the company or training programme, and is aware of those rights and responsibilities that are essential in the workplace; this usually requires the creation of a personal portfolio of activities, reading and instruction sessions, but is not examined.
- A path with parity involving university-only education.

In Scotland, Modern Apprenticeship Frameworks are approved by the Modern Apprenticeship Group (MAG) and it, with the support of the Scottish Government, has determined that from January 2010, all Frameworks submitted to it for approval, must have the mandatory elements credit rated for the Scottish Credit and Qualifications Framework (SCQF).

As of 2009, there are over 180 apprenticeship frameworks. The current scheme extends beyond manufacturing and high technology industry to parts of the service sector with no apprenticeship tradition. In 2008, Creative & Cultural Skills, the Sector Skills Council, introduced a set of Creative Apprenticeships awarded by EDI. A freelance apprenticeship framework was also approved and uses freelance professionals to mentor freelance apprentices. The Freelance Apprenticeship was first written and proposed by Karen Akroyd (Access To Music) in 2008. In 2011, Freelance Music Apprenticeships are available in music colleges in Birmingham, Manchester and London. The Department of Education under its 2007–2010 name stated their intention to make apprenticeships a "mainstream part of England's education system".

Employers who offer apprenticeship places have an employment contract with their apprentices, but off-the-job training and assessment is wholly funded by the state for apprentices aged between 16–18 years. In England, Government only contributes 50% of the cost of training for apprentices aged 19–24 years. Apprenticeships at Level 3 or above for those aged 24 or over no longer receive state funding, although there is a state loan facility in place by which individuals or companies can cover the cost of study and assessment and repay the state by installments over an extended period at preferential rates of interest.

Government funding agencies (in England, the Skills Funding Agency) contract with "learning providers" to deliver apprenticeships, and may accredit them as a National Skills Academy. These organisations provide off-the-job tuition and manage the bureaucratic workload associated with the apprenticeships. Providers are usually private training companies but might also be further education colleges, voluntary sector organisations, Chambers of Commerce or employers themselves.

=== Structure of apprenticeships in 2000s ===
The UK government has implemented an apprenticeship structure which in many ways resembles the traditional architecture of the 1950s, 1960s and 1970s. There are three levels of apprenticeship available spanning 2–6 years of progression. It is possible for ambitious apprentices to progress from level 2 (intermediate) to level 7 ( master's degree) over many years of training and education. Learners start at a level which reflects their current qualifications and the opportunities available in the sector of interest:

Intermediate Apprenticeship (Level 2; equivalent to five good GCSE passes): provides learners with the skills and qualifications for their chosen career and allow entry (if desired) to an Advanced Apprenticeship. To be accepted learners need to be enthusiastic, keen to learn and have a reasonable standard of education; most employers require applicants to have two or more GCSEs (A*-C), including English and Maths.

Advanced Apprenticeship (Level 3; equivalent to two A-level passes): to start this programme, learners should have five GCSEs (grade A*-C) or have completed an Intermediate Apprenticeship. This will provide them with the skills and qualifications needed for their career and allow entry (if desired) to a Higher Apprenticeship or degree level qualification. Advanced apprenticeships can last between two and four years.

Higher Apprenticeship (Level 4/5; equivalent to a Foundation Degree): to start this programme, learners should have a Level 3 qualification (A-Levels, Advanced Diploma or International Baccalaureate) or have completed an Advanced Apprenticeship. Higher apprenticeships are designed for students who are aged 18 or over.

Degree Apprenticeship (Level 5/6; achieve bachelor's degree) and (Level 7 Masters): to start this programme, learners should have a level 3/4 qualification (A-Levels, Advanced Diploma or International Baccalaureate) relevant to occupation or have completed an Advanced Apprenticeship also relevant to occupation. It differs from a 'Higher Apprenticeship' due to graduating with a bachelor's degree at an accredited university. Degree apprenticeships can last between two and four years.

Under the current UK system, commencing from 2013, groups of employers ('trailblazers') develop new apprenticeships, working together to design apprenticeship standards and assessment approaches. As at July 2015, there were 140 Trailblazer employer groups which had so far collectively delivered or were in the process of delivering over 350 apprenticeship standards.

In industries where self-employment or unpaid employment are the typical form of work, an "alternative English apprenticeship" may be used (in England). Alternative English apprenticeships also operate where an apprentice has been made redundant but continues with their training although not in a paid apprenticeship position, and for elite athletes training with a view to competing in the Olympics, Paralympics or Commonwealth Games. This form of apprenticeship is regulated by the Apprenticeships (Alternative English Completion Conditions) Regulations 2012. Apprentices who have been made redundant but continue with their training must complete their apprenticeship within six months of their redundancy.

=== Numbers of apprentices ===
As of January 2021, there were 253,100 new starters across all of the above apprenticeships. The Advanced apprenticeship is the largest of them, with 108,100 new starts, followed by the higher apprenticeship with 80,700 before the intermediate apprenticeship, with 64,300. Although the advanced apprenticeship has always been the most popular format, until the 2020/21 cycle the Higher Apprenticeship had always had the lowest number of new starters. The low take-up of apprenticeships in the road transport sector, especially among smaller logistics companies, has been highlighted as a concern which will likely maintain shortages of HGV drivers in the UK.

== Apprenticeship Levy ==
Since April 2017, an Apprenticeship Levy has been in place to fund apprenticeships.

== Public sector ==
Many UK public bodies are subject to a statutory target to employ an average of at least 2.3% of their staff as new start apprentices over the period from 1 April 2017 to 31 March 2021, and to "have regard" to this target when planning their recruitment and career development activities. Since 1 September 2015 central government departments, their agencies and non-departmental public bodies have been required to use the procurement of contracts worth £10 million or more and lasting for 12 months or longer, to support skills development and the Government's apprenticeship commitment. An earlier version of this guidance limited the obligation to major construction and infrastructure projects with capital values in excess of £50m.

== See also ==
- National Apprenticeship Service
- Deck Cadet
- Apprentices Act 1536
- Apprenticeship Ambassadors Network
- Apprenticeships, Skills, Children and Learning Act 2009
- Apprenticeship Levy
- Higher apprenticeship
- Degree apprenticeship
- Post-Apprenticeship Recognition Scheme
