= International Ranger Federation =

The International Ranger Federation is an organisation which represents Park Rangers and Park Wardens across the world.

Many countries have agencies that undertake the protection and management of natural areas. The rangers within these organisations are represented at the international level by the International Ranger Federation (IRF). The IRF seeks to represent Park Rangers on a professional level. A number of countries also have affiliated organisations with the same goals.

== History ==
The International Ranger Federation (IRF) was founded in 1992 with a signed agreement between the Countryside Management Association (CMA), representing rangers in England and Wales; the Scottish Countryside Rangers Association (SCRA); and the U.S. Association of National Park Rangers (ANPR). The IRF is a non-profit organisation established to raise awareness and support the critical work that Rangers do in conserving the world's natural and cultural heritage.

== Purpose ==
The IRF aims to empower rangers by supporting their national or state ranger organisations, or assisting in the establishment of local ranger associations in countries where they do not currently exist. The goals of the IRF are to provide a forum for rangers from around the world to share their successes and failures in protecting the world's heritage and to promote information and technology transfer from countries in which protected area management enjoys broad public and government support to countries in which protected area management is less well supported.

== Membership ==
Membership is structured through seven regions, each represented by a regional representative. As of 2019, the IRF has over 100 associations of rangers. Over 60 countries that have applied for one of three membership types: Regular, Provisional & Associate Membership.

== World Ranger Congress ==
Every 3 years, the World Ranger Congress is held by a host country.

- 11th: 2027 – Puerto Iguazu, Argentina (forthcoming)
- 10th: 2024 – Hyères, France
- 9th: 2019 – Chitwan, Nepal
- 8th: 2016 – Estes Park, Colorado, US
- 7th: 2012 – Arusha, Tanzania
- 6th: 2009 – Santa Cruz, Bolivia
- 5th: 2006 – Stirling, Scotland
- 4th: 2003 – Wilsons Promontory National Park, Australia
- 3rd: 2000 – Kruger National Park, South Africa
- 2nd: 1997 – San Jose, Costa Rica
- 1st: 1995 – Zakopane, Poland

== Affiliated organisations ==
The Australian Ranger Federation (ARF), Associazione Italiana Guardie dei Parchi e delle Aree Protette (AIGAP), Association of National Park Rangers (ANPR)
