= CCDA =

CCDA may refer to:

- Canadian Council of Directors of Apprenticeship
- Cisco CCDA certification
- Consolidated Clinical Document Architecture
