= Pipe fitting =

Pipe fitting may refer to:

- The work of pipefitters, who install or repair piping or tubing systems
- Piping and plumbing fittings, adapters used in pipe systems
