= Robert Grieve (town planner) =

Professor Sir Robert (Bob) Grieve (Kt.) MA(Glas), DLitt(H-W), LLD(Strath), Drhc(Edin), MICE, FRTPI, HonFRIAS, HonFRSGS

1st Chairman of the Highlands and Islands Development Board
- In office 1965–1970
- Succeeded by: Sir Andrew Gilchrist

1st Professor of Town and Regional Planning, University of Glasgow
- In office 1964–1974
- Succeeded by: Gordon Cameron

Chief Planning Officer for Scotland at the Scottish Office
- In office 1960–1964

Personal details
- Born: 11 December 1910 Maryhill, Glasgow, Scotland
- Died: 25 October 1995 (aged 84) Edinburgh, Scotland
- Spouse: Mary Blackburn
- Children: Ann, Elizabeth, Iain and William
- Parent: Catherine
- Education: Royal College of Science and Technology
- Profession: Civil Engineer and Town Planner

Sir Robert Grieve FRSE RTPI RIAS FRSGS LLD DLit (11 December 1910 – 25 October 1995) was a Scottish polymath: engineer, planner, academic, mountaineer, poet, raconteur and visionary. Grieve played a pivotal part in both the Clyde Valley Regional Plan and the Highlands and Islands Development Board. Reflecting on his career, he described it as a process of "falling up the ladder".

== Biography ==
=== Early life ===
Grieve was born on 11 December 1910 in Maryhill, Glasgow in a tenement, one of six children to Peter Grieve and his wife, Catherine Boyle. Grieve's father, was a Clydeside boilermaker who did little with his family other than provide a weekly wage packet. His mother, Catherine, was radically socialist, well read and a caring and faithful Roman Catholic. Catherine took Grieve out of the local Roman Catholic School, recognising his potential and intelligence. She was upset that she could not send Grieve to St Aloysius or other fee-paying Roman Catholic school, instead sending him to North Kelvinside school.

The greatest influences on Grieve in his early years were his mother and his uncle Tom. He later described his mother as "a caged tigress". Grieve was taken on "enormous walks" by his uncle. They would travel by tram to get to the countryside. This is where Grieve first saw "the hills of the Campsies in the distance, and once far away the bulk of Ben Lomond".

Grieve learnt values from his uncle and mother of nature and book loving, and a questioning and critical mind. He rarely spoke of his uncle without being moved to tears.

At weekends and holidays Grieve continued walking in the nearby countryside in the Campsie Fells, Loch Lomondside, the Trossachs and the west coast. Looking in at Glasgow, rather than being immersed in it, spaked his determination to alter and improve city dwellers' lives.

=== Early career ===
Grieve trained and qualified as a civil engineer at the Royal College of Science and Technology. While working for the Glasgow Corporation, Grieve was further encouraged to take night classes and become a qualified town planner, passing the final exam of the Town Planning Institute in 1937.

In the 1930s, Grieve held various posts in local government, including with Paisley Burgh Council and Renfrew County Council. Grieve also had periods of unemployment. During these times he would nurture his passion for climbing and walking in the hills.

In 1940, Grieve was responsible for the construction of air-raid shelters in Clydebank. He used his engineering skills to devise a novel strategy of distributing and locating shelters so that they could be reached from peoples homes in the shortest possible time. Grieve is credited with having saved significant numbers of civilians during the Clydebank Blitz.

Later Grieve claimed that there was a time when Scotland had only two qualified town planners, of which he was one.

=== Marriage and children ===
In 1933. Grieve married Mary Blackburn, always known as May. They had four children, Ann, Elizabeth, Iain and William.

Grieve was very close with his wife Mary who supported him in his endeavours. She was described as a charming lady who kept Grieve in Scotland when he was offered a position as government Chief Planner in London.

After a long illness May Grieve died in 1984, which caused Grieve profound anguish.

=== Clyde Valley Regional Plan ===
From 1944, Grieve worked on the Clyde Valley Regional Plan. According to a later colleague Alec Kerr: "He was always involved in seminal works, and he was the person to ask the searching question which simulated [sic] reasonable thought and forced people to think in depth about what they were proposing."

Grieve's influences on the plan included the framework for moving Glasgow's overspill into new towns, and ensuring that new towns were not only economic development centres but also viable communities.

The preservation of Eaglesham and the concept of East Kilbride were both examples of Grieve's concern for properly balanced communities.

While the best known name on the Clyde Valley Regional Plan was that of architect Sir Patrick Abercrombie, Grieve and Hugh McCalman did most of the work. Grieve was originally tasked with completing the plan's chapter on recreation. The chapter was so good that Grieve was asked to contribute more and more by Sir Robert Matthew. Grieve's concern was the social aspects of planning and how it would effect people. As a result, he was sometimes in conflict with his friend, the civil servant James McGuinness, head of the Scottish Economic Planning Department.

The Clyde Valley Regional Plan had a major influence on the development of Glasgow.

=== Chief Planning Officer for Scotland ===
In 1946, Grieve joined the Department of Health in the Scottish Office in a new planning division, initially as regional planning officer for the Highlands and Islands. Later he became regional planning officer for the Clyde Valley.

In the years 1960 to 1964, Grieve was given the new Scottish Office post of Chief Planning Officer for Scotland. An example of Grieve's searching questions was his challenge, in 1962, to Glasgow Corporation's plans to build 650 high-rise blocks of flats within the city. The only blocks to be built were the Red Road Flats which have since been demolished.

During his time as chief planning officer, Grieve had influence on road transport planning for the Central Belt and the planning of new towns in Scotland.

=== Chair of Town and Regional Planning, University of Glasgow ===
In 1964, the University of Glasgow invited Grieve to become their first Professor of Town and Regional Planning, a post he held until he retired in 1974.

He was knighted by Queen Elizabeth II in 1969.

At Glasgow Grieve created a Masters programme in planning that was social-science based. The initial intention was that the programme be independent of recognition by the Royal Town Planning Institute. Grieve's views on urban development were similar to work being developed by Donald Robertson, his close friend, another professor in the Department of Social & Economic Research. In his seminars and lectures, Grieve practised breadth in education, following Patrick Geddes, another great Scottish planner, with recitations of Scots poetry, particularly of the modern makars.

=== Highlands and Islands Development Board ===
When the Highlands and Islands Development Board (HIDB) was established in 1965, the first choice of the then Secretary of State for Scotland, Willie Ross, for the chairmanship was Grieve. William Kerr Fraser said of Grieve "The Secretary of State wanted a man of radical approach who both knew the Highlands and was well known in the Highlands." Kerr Fraser also said of Grieve that "He dreamed dreams and was almost fey – but converted them into reality. He saw things against a large canvas. Above all, Bob Grieve did not keep his head below the parapet."

The University of Glasgow agreed to his five year, full time secondment to the HIDB on condition that he could be consulted by the university on the development of his department of Town and Regional Planning and its research activities.

Grieve set a long-term goal of the establishment of a university of the Highlands & Islands during his first year as chairman.

Encouraged by international interest, the HIDB in conjunction with the British Council ran an annual seminar for overseas students, especially from the Third World, in Plockton. These seminars were chaired and planned by Grieve and extended his influence on planning and planners beyond the UK to an international audience.

=== Recreation ===
In Who's Who, Grieve listed poetry and mountaineering as his leisure pursuits.

Early influences were Jack London and H. G. Wells. While he had read the great philosophers, he could also quote from Zen and the Art of Motorcycle Maintenance by Robert M. Pirsig. He had read it many times and scrawled annotations on his copy.

One of his aphorisms was "unscrewing the inscrutable" to describe a deliberate and careful thought process on complex matters.

In 1967, BBC Scotland invited Grieve to introduce the poems and songs for their Burns' Night programme.

Grieve was a keen and skilled mountaineer and became president of both the Scottish Mountaineering Council and the Scottish Mountaineering Club.

=== Other chairmanships and presidencies ===
Grieve was chairman of the Royal Fine Art Commission for Scotland 1978–1983. Charles Prosser, secretary of the Royal Fine Arts Commission for Scotland, remembered Grieve as a great chairman, and pointed to a paragraph in the commission's 1982 annual report:

"The design for the British National Oil Corporation headquarters in St Vincent Street, Glasgow, was strongly opposed by us and to a greater or lesser extent by all the voluntary amenity bodies who studied it. The chairman of BNOC wrote to the effect that he and his corporation are as well able to assess design quality as we are. We think this opinion to be no more pertinent than any opinions we might have on how to run an oil company."

Grieve was also chairman of the Highlands and Islands Development Consultative Council 1978–1986.

Grieve chaired an enquiry for Glasgow into their housing conditions, in the 1980s.

In 1988, Grieve chaired the Campaign for a Scottish Assembly committee that drafted the Claim of Right for Scotland, which was published in June 1988.

Grieve was president of many bodies, including: Friends of Loch Lomond; the Inverness Civic Trust; numerous mountaineering organisations; the New Glasgow Society; the Saltire Society; the Scottish Branch of the Royal Town Planning Institute; the Scottish Countryside Rangers Association; and the Scottish Rights of Way Society.

=== Death and afterwards ===
Grieve died after a long illness in Edinburgh on 25 October 1995. His son William summed up Grieve's life in his death notice incorporating a favourite phrase of his father's: "Throughout his life he exchanged the unexceptionable sentiment for the terror of action."

The University of Glasgow has named the Sir Robert Grieve Dissertation Prizes after him.

== Published works ==
- Grieve on Geddes (1991) the Sir Patrick Geddes Memorial Trust, Scotland.

Grieve collaborated on and part authored several professional reports and books. He also had many articles and papers in technical and professional journals.

== Awards ==
In the 1969 Queen's Birthday Honours List Grieve was created a Knight Bachelor .

In 1976, Heriot-Watt University appointed Grieve as an honorary professor. Grieve was also honoured by Strathclyde University and the University of Edinburgh.

In 1974, the Royal Town Planning Institute awarded Grieve their gold medal, the tenth to be awarded in sixty years.

Grieve was an Honorary Fellow of the Royal Scottish Geographical Society and the Royal Incorporation of Architects in Scotland.

In 1980, Grieve was elected a Fellow of the Royal Society of Edinburgh.

In 1990, Grieve received the Lord Provost of Glasgow's award for Outstanding Public Service.
