= Red Seal Program =

Program that sets common standards for tradespeople in Canada

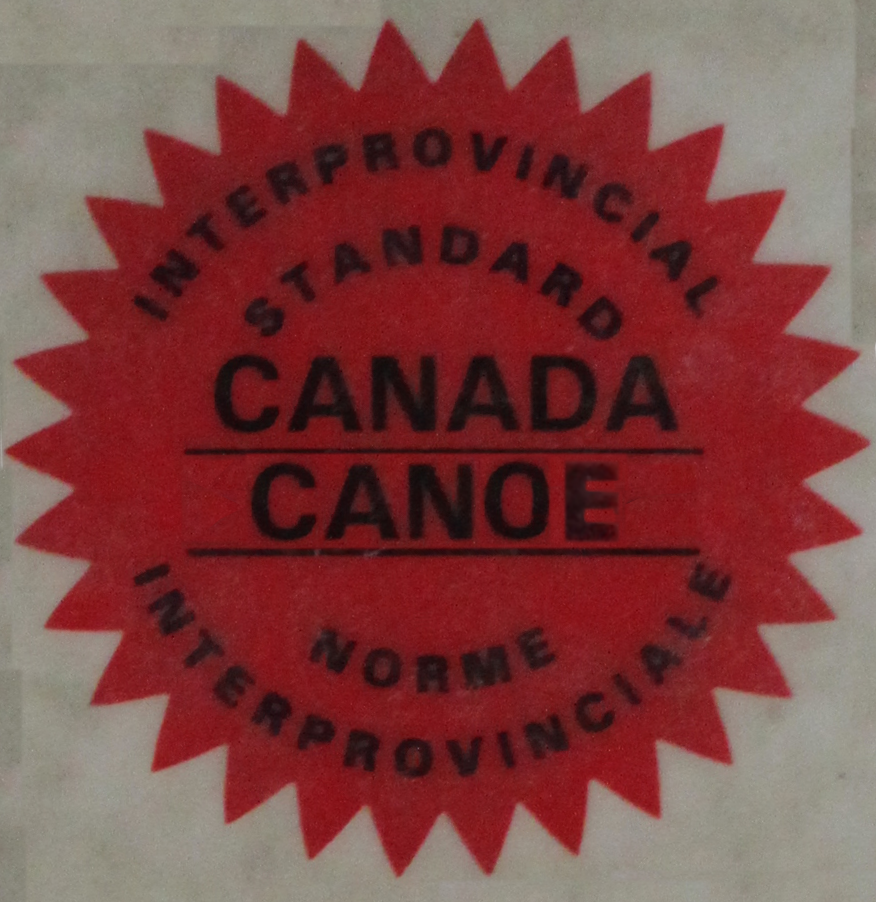
Specimen of a Red Seal Endorsement (Red Seal number goes where the word "canoe" is.)

Red Seal Program, specifically known as The Interprovincial Standards Red Seal Program, is a program that sets common standards for tradespeople in Canada. It is a partnership between the Canadian federal government, the provinces and the territories.

The Red Seal program is under the jurisdiction of the Canadian Council of Directors of Apprenticeship (CCDA) It was created in 1959 as a result of the first National Conference on Apprenticeship in Trades and Industries, held in Ottawa in 1952. Not all provinces/territories participate in all the Red Seal trades.

There are 54 trades currently recognized in the Red Seal program. They include auto mechanic, carpenter, cook, electrician, heavy equipment operator, ironworker, machinist, millwright, pipefitter, plumber, roofer, tool and die maker, and welder.

== Operations ==
When tradespersons complete their apprenticeships and pass the Red Seal examination they receive a Red Seal Endorsement ("RSE") on their provincial/territorial trade certificate, usually called a "Certificate of Qualification".

Chapter 7 of the Canada Free Trade Agreement (formerly the Agreement on Internal Trade) generally requires provincial and territorial governments to recognize individuals who hold certain trade certificates issued by a Canadian province or territory as having met the requirements to practice their occupation elsewhere in Canada.

Provinces and territories are responsible for administering apprenticeship training and trade certification in their respective jurisdictions, including the administration of the Red Seal Program. Each province and territory administers and regulates apprenticeship and certification under their own legislation:

- Prince Edward Island's program is regulated by the Apprenticeship and Trades Qualification Act
- Nova Scotia's program is regulated by the Apprenticeship and Trades Qualification Act
- Newfoundland's program is regulated by the Apprenticeship and Certification Act
- New Brunswick's program is regulated by the Apprenticeship and Occupational Certification Act
- Quebec's program is regulated by the Manpower Vocational Training and Qualification Act
- Ontario 's program is regulated by the Building Opportunities in the Skilled Trades Act.
- Manitoba's program is regulated by the Apprenticeship and Certification Act.
- Saskatchewan's program is regulated by the Apprenticeship and Trade Certification Act
- Alberta's program is regulated by the Apprenticeship and Industry Training Act
- British Columbia's program is regulated by the Skilled Trades BC Act
- Nunavut's program is regulated by the Trade and Occupations Certification Act
- The Yukon Territories' program is regulated by the Apprenticeship Training Act
- The Northwest Territories' program is regulated by the Apprenticeship, Trade, and Occupation Certification Act

Most provinces and territories use the Red Seal examination as the final certification exam in designated Red Seal trades. Many employers only hire persons with this qualification to avoid varying standards among the provinces.
