= SCRA =

SCRA may refer to:

- Securities Contracts (Regulation) Act, 1956
- Scottish Children's Reporter Administration
- Scottish Countryside Rangers Association
- Servicemembers Civil Relief Act
- South Carolina Research Authority, a research organization in South Carolina
- Southern Contemporary Rock Assembly, an Australian jazz-rock group (1971–72)
- Special Class Railway Apprentice, an Indian railway apprenticeship
- Sugar City Ratepayers Alliance, a Fijian political party
- SC Rheindorf Altach, an Austrian association football team based in Altach
- Supreme Court Reports Annotated of the Supreme Court of the Philippines; used in case citations
- Synthetic Cannabinoids, as in Synthetic Cannabinoid Receptor Agonist
