= Lena Wilson (executive) =

Scottish businessperson (born c.1965)

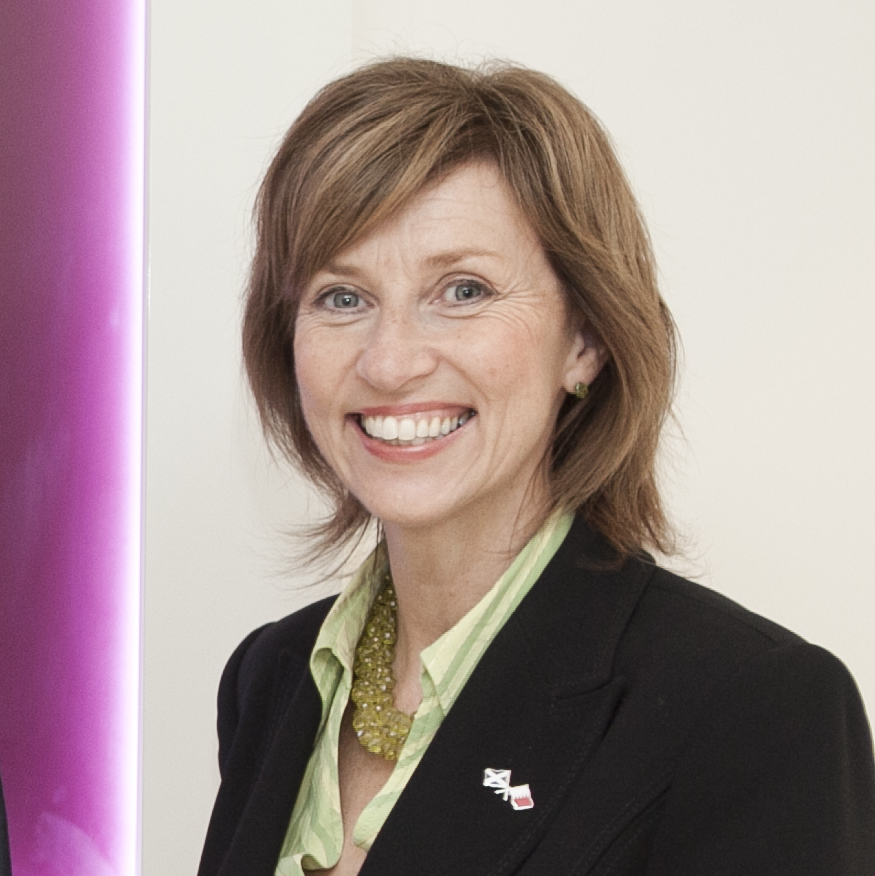
- Born: Lena Cooper Wilson c.1965 Yorkhill, Glasgow
- Education: Glasgow Caledonian University and University of Strathclyde
- Occupation: Executive
- Known for: CEO of Scottish Enterprise
- Successor: Steve Dunlop

Lena Cooper Wilson CBE (born c. 1965) is a United Kingdom Scottish executive and bank employee. She rose to be the CEO of Scottish Enterprise. She went on to directorships with a number of organisations.

== Early life and career ==
Wilson was born in Yorkhill which is part of Glasgow near Partick in about 1965. At the age of two her parents moved to East Kilbride so that her father could work for Rolls-Royce plc. He stepped down in role to become a labourer to give the family a more rural outlook. Wilson was keen at school but she wasn't attracted to science and engineering. When she went to university she studied Business Administration at Glasgow Caledonian University with a vague ambition of becoming a diplomat or working for the United Nations. She realised that she needed to find the money to travel to London for work and her first job was advertised as a "Girl Friday" when such adverts were legal in Britain.

Wilson became the Chief Executive of Scottish Enterprise in 2009. She had previously lead Scotland’s international trade and investment arm "Scottish Development International".

Wilson was involved when Scottish First Minister Alex Salmond signed the Masdar agreement with Sultan Ahmed Al Jaber on behalf of UAE's Masdar Institute of Science and Technology at the World Future Energy Summit in 2012. Hundreds will co-operate on the development of wind power.

Wilson was awarded a CBE in 2015 for her contribution to "economic development" in Scotland. Wilson lead the government's Scottish O&G job taskforce whose task was completed in 2017 and the same year she left Scottish Enterprise in October. She had received criticism from the Scottish Parliament over taking a paid, non-executive directorship with the multinational product testing and certification company Interek. Wilson had been paid £214,000 a year by Scottish Enterprise and she was replaced by Steve Dunlop. Dunlop was offered £168,000 a year and he was said to be one of the top paid civil servants in Scotland.

Wilson also joined the board of the Royal Bank of Scotland in 2017.

In 2019, she became the chair of the accountancy firm "Chiene and Tait" which is based in Edinburgh In the same year, she was elected to be a fellow of the Royal Society of Edinburgh.

In 2025 the University of Strathclyde made Wilson their Alumnus of the Year.
