= Degree apprenticeship =

HIgher education programme in England and Wales

In 2015 the UK government rolled out the degree apprenticeship programme in England and Wales which was developed as part of the higher apprenticeship standard. The programme is the equivalent of a master's or bachelor's degree which offers a level 6 – 7 qualification. Training for this qualification includes working in a full-time job as well as studying at a partner university or training provider. Depending on the institution of study, the delivery model for the taught element is either distance learning, or the student attends university in person on day release from their employer.

The equivalent programme in Scotland launched in 2016 is given the alternative name of a graduate apprenticeship, and is administered by Skills Development Scotland,

In 2022 Euan Blair's company Multiverse became the first solely apprenticeship provider to receive powers to award degrees.

== Requirements ==
Degree apprenticeships have been designed for learners 18 years of age or older.

Candidates interested in this programme must already have a Level 3 qualification such as an advanced/modern apprenticeship, A-Levels or an International Baccalaureate. However, some programmes may require further training.

In the equivalent Scottish Graduate Apprenticeship programme, the requirement is a Level 6 (or better) qualification in the Scottish Credit and Qualifications Framework (SQA) - which is Highers or a modern apprenticeship leading to a Higher National Certificate (HNC).

== See also ==
- Professional Science Master's Degree
