= Scottish Special Housing Association =

The Scottish Special Housing Association was established in 1937 to provide good-quality social housing. It had headquarters in Edinburgh's West End, Palmerston Place and Manor Place, Edinburgh, where it employed a large team of architects, engineers and quantity surveyors. It was responsible for the construction of many social housing estates, including "Area D" of the Hutchesontown Comprehensive Development Area ("D" was one of the more successful schemes in the area compared to the infamous "C" and "E" developments), and peripheral estates of Arden, Toryglen and Wyndford, all in Glasgow. It was an early adopter of Computer Aided Architectural Design.

Its chairman from 1968 to 1972 was Sir William Gray who went on to be Lord Provost of Glasgow.

SSHA had a large Direct Labour Organisation (DLO) which helped develop a no-fines concrete building technique which was used to build thousands of houses.

In 1989 it was abolished (as a direct result of Conservative policy on privatisation under Margaret Thatcher) and some of its functions transferred to Scottish Homes. The 75,000 housing units were transferred to housing associations and co-operatives between 1990 and 2005.
