= Post-Apprenticeship Recognition Scheme =

- Icon for the Post-Apprenticeship Recognition Scheme
- Type: Certification
- Awarded for: Successful completion of a UK apprenticeship to an excellent standard
- Sponsored by: The Chartered Institution for Further Education, Association of Apprentices
- Country: United Kingdom
- Eligibility: completed a UK-based apprenticeship completion certificate sponsorship
- Post-nominals: CSA, CAA, CHA, CGA
- Motto: E Libertate Praestantia
- Website: https://associationofapprentices.org.uk/pars/

The Post-Apprenticeship Recognition Scheme, also known as PARS, is a certification granted to completed apprentices in the United Kingdom. It was created recognise the unique educational route and skills gained throughout an apprenticeship, in addition to advocating for parity of esteem between apprenticeships and other learning options such as full-time higher education.

== History ==
The Post-Apprenticeship Recognition Scheme was launched in November 2023. The launch event was at the House of Lords, with notable attendees including Baron Lingfield, Peter Estlin and Jason Holt.

The first awards were bestowed at Mansion House in 2024 during National Apprenticeship Week.

== Eligibility ==
To be eligible for the Post-Apprenticeship Recognition Scheme, candidates must:

1. have completed an apprenticeship in the UK
2. be in possession of their official apprenticeship completion certificate
3. have the support of their employer, provider or another industry-linked contact

== Grades ==
The Post-Apprenticeship Recognition Scheme has four grades, based on the highest level of apprenticeship completed by the candidate. Bearers are entitled to use the post-nominal letters corresponding with their certification.

Certification name	Postnominals	Qualification level (England, Wales and Northern Ireland)	Qualification level (Scotland)
Certificate of Standard Apprenticeship	CSA	2	5
Certificate of Advanced Apprenticeship	CAA	3	6
Certificate of Higher Apprenticeship	CHA	4 & 5	7 & 8
Certificate of Graduate Apprenticeship	CGA	6 & 7	9 - 12
