= Business Gateway =

Business Gateway is a Scottish Government resource that offers advice and guidance to startup companies and established companies across Scotland. Business Gateway is the Scottish equivalent of Business Link, aiming to provide free, impartial, and confidential advice to anyone who uses the service.

The Scottish Government funded programme provides free business support to small and medium enterprises in Scotland. An extension of the Small Business Gateway (2001), it was introduced in July 2003 and is currently delivered by 12 councils in the Lowlands and 6 in the Highlands and Islands. Responsibility for management of the Business Gateway contracts was transferred to local government from Scottish Enterprise on 1 April 2008. The transfer arrangements made provision for lead local authorities in the Lowlands; where there was more than one local authority in the contract area, they were required to nominate a lead local authority to manage the contract. The Business Gateway service was introduced in the Highlands and Islands in September 2009 with service delivery based on the 6 areas there. The 2011 evaluation of Business Gateway, endorsed by the Business Gateway Scotland Board (BGSB) and the Scottish Government, recommended that the lead local authority arrangements be continued for the new Business Gateway contracts from 1 October 2012.

There are three key service areas which together form the core areas which Business Gateway offers across Scotland. Often other services are available and may be subject to local variations depending on markets and local authority focus. The core service covers three areas:

== Start-Up Advisory Service ==
The principal components are training workshops and advisory services. The Start-Up Advisory Service covers both pre-start and start-up/early stage support. The advisory services (one-to-one support) focus on higher value start-up businesses which are capable, with the support of Business Gateway, of employing staff. A start-up is a business that has been trading for less than 6 months. The advisor support will help the business achieve their growth objectives and aspirations. For start-up businesses not expected to employ staff, the support is predominantly through the Business Gateway website, workshops on specific business areas, the Business Gateway Enquiry Service and referrals to other services. Additional local support services may also be available to this group at the discretion of the local provider/Local Authority.

== Growth Advisory Service ==
The principal components are training workshops and advisory services. The Growth Advisory Service is available to businesses with the potential to meet growth thresholds identified by the Local Authority. The Growth Advisory Service makes nominated one-to-one advisor support available to the customer to help them achieve their growth objectives through delivery of an Action Plan for Growth.

== Local Services ==
In addition to the core services outlined above, the Business Gateway Local Services package provides Local Authority designed services which complement but do not duplicate existing Business Gateway national core services. The purpose of this element of the service is to ensure that Business Gateway services are able to:

- respond quickly and appropriately to changes in the needs of the local business base; and
- accurately reflect the specific pressures felt by local businesses.

These interventions include: Business Gateway recovery/sustainability advisory support; expert help and specialist support; localised bespoke training workshops; and networking events to inequality groups. Business Gateway providers in Scotland are a mix of contractors and Local Authority in house operations. The service is overseen by a Management Group which is currently (Jan 2018) being restructured and benefits from a national operations unit based in Edinburgh.
