= Pipefitter =

Tradesman who works with mechanical pipes

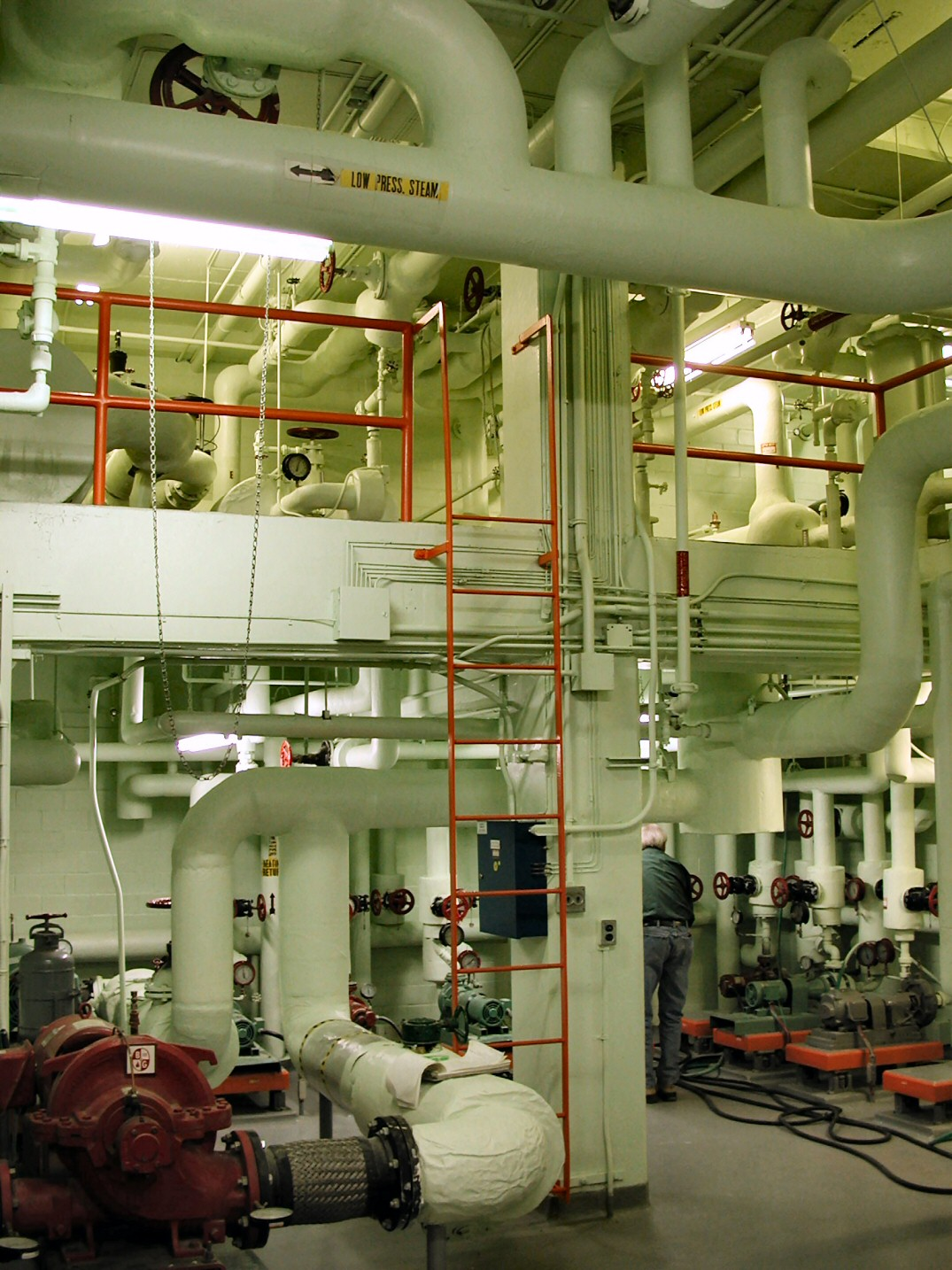
Large-scale piping system in an HVAC mechanical room

A pipefitter, or steamfitter, is a tradesman who installs, assembles, fabricates, maintains, and repairs mechanical piping systems. Pipefitters usually begin as helpers or apprentices. Journeyman pipefitters deal with industrial/commercial/marine piping and heating/cooling systems. Typical industrial process pipe is under high pressure, which requires metals such as carbon steel, stainless steel, and many different alloy metals fused together through precise cutting, threading, grooving, bending, and welding. A plumber concentrates on lower pressure piping systems for sewage and potable tap water in the industrial, commercial, institutional, or residential atmosphere. Utility piping typically consists of copper, PVC, CPVC, polyethylene, and galvanized pipe, which is typically glued, soldered, or threaded. Other types of piping systems include steam, ventilation, hydraulics, chemicals, fuel, and oil.

In Canada, pipefitting is classified as a compulsory trade, and carries a voluntary "red seal" inter-provincial standards endorsement. Pipefitter apprenticeships are controlled and regulated provincially, and in some cases allow for advance standing in similar trades upon completion.

In the United States, many states require pipefitters to be licensed. Requirements differ from state to state, but most include a four- to five-year apprenticeship. Union pipefitters are required to pass an apprenticeship test (often called a "turn-out exam") before becoming a licensed journeyman. Others can be certified by NCCER (formerly the National Center for Construction Education and Research).

== Occupational summary ==
Pipefitters install, assemble, fabricate, maintain, repair, and troubleshoot pipe carrying fuel, chemicals, water, steam, and air in heating, cooling, lubricating, and various other process piping systems. Pipefitters are employed in the maintenance departments of power stations, refineries, offshore installations, factories, and similar establishments, by pipefitting contractors.

=== Scope of work ===
- Blueprint reading
- Detailing
- CAD drawing coordinators
- Layout
- Pipe threading
- Pipe grinding
- Plasma cutting
- Gas arc cutting
- Rigging
- Brazing
- Soldering
- Mitering
- Tube bending
- Valve installation and repair
- Mechanical pipe cutting and grooving
- Supports and hanger installation
- Preparation and installation of medical gas piping
- Welding (GMAW, GTAW, SMAW, Orbital)

== Trade groups ==
In North America, union pipefitters are members of the United Association. Wages vary from area to area, based on demands for experienced personnel and existing contracts between local unions and contractors. The United Association is also affiliated with the piping trades unions in Ireland and Australia.

== Differences between pipefitting and pipelaying ==
Pipefitters should not be confused with pipelayers. Both trades involve pipe and valves and both use some of the same tools. However, pipelayers usually work outside, laying pipe underground or on the seabed, whereas pipefitters typically work inside, installing piping in buildings, aeroplanes, or ships.

One author summarizes the different tasks as follows:

Pipe layers operate the backhoes and trenching machinery that dig the trenches to accommodate the placement of sanitary sewer pipes and stormwater sewer drainpipes. They use surveyor’s equipment to ensure the trenches have the proper slope and install the pieces of pipe in the trenches, joining the ends with cement, glue, or welding equipment. Using an always-open or always-closed valve called a tap, pipe layers connect them to a wider system and bury the pipes.

whereas,

Pipe fitters plan and test piping and tubing layouts; cut, bend or fabricate pipe or tubing segments; and join those segments by threading them, using lead joints, welding, brazing, cementing, or soldering them together. They install manual, pneumatic, hydraulic and electric valves in pipes to control the flow through the pipes or tubes. These workers create the system of tubes in boilers and make holes in walls and bulkheads to accommodate the passage of the pipes they install.

== Occupational hazards ==
Pipe fitters are often exposed to hazardous or dangerous materials, such as asbestos, lead, ammonia, steam, flammable gases, various resins and solvents including benzene and various refrigerants. Much progress was made in the 20th century toward eliminating or reducing hazardous materials exposures. Many aspects of hazardous materials are now regulated by law in most countries, including asbestos usage and removal and refrigerant selection and handling. A major occupational hazard that pipefitters face is welding and torch cutting fumes, including from heavy metals and chlorinated compounds, and ultraviolet light. Additionally, they face hazards from contact with solvents, adhesives, and epoxies during the repair or installation of polymer pipes and from exposure to materials and liquids in old pipes during repair or removal.

Other occupational hazards include exposure to the weather, heavy lifting, crushing hazards, lacerations, and other risks normal to the construction industry.

== See also ==
- Piping and plumbing fitting
