= South of Scotland Enterprise =

Development agency operating in Southern Scotland

Agency overview
- Formed: 2020
- Type: Executive non-departmental public body
- Jurisdiction: Scotland
- Headquarters: Carmont House, The Crichton, Bankhead Road, Dumfries
- Agency executives: Jane Morrison-Ross, Chief Executive; Russel Griggs, Chair
- Website: www.southofscotlandenterprise.com

South of Scotland Enterprise is the development agency for southern Scotland, covering the council areas of Scottish Borders and Dumfries and Galloway. It is an executive non-departmental public body of the Scottish Government, and was established in 2020, following the passage of the South of Scotland Enterprise Act 2019.

It is one of three development agencies in Scotland, operating alongside Scottish Enterprise (which covers the central belt and eastern Scotland), and Highlands and Islands Enterprise (which covers the northern and western parts of the country). The three agencies jointly operate Scottish Development International which exists to assist Scottish companies grow their export markets.

Its remit includes market research surveys, including its business panel survey, funding land development projects as well as tourism and heritage development.
