= Professional Science Master's Degree =

Advanced academic degree

The Professional Science Master's degree (abbreviated as PSM or P.S.M.) is an interdisciplinary master's degree program which integrates advanced technical training with business and professional leadership skills. In contrast to traditional research-based Master of Science or Master of Arts degrees, the Professional Science Master's degree is usually offered by a degree-granting university in partnership with an industry partner in specific emerging fields such as forensic science, computational chemistry, applied mathematics, bioinformatics, and data science. Because of this industry partnership, PSM degree holders have high level of employability after graduation. PSM programs can be completed in sixteen months to two years of full-time or part-time study including a professional internship or a capstone project.

== History ==
Recognizing that traditional graduate-level science training may not be suitable for non-academic careers, the Alfred P. Sloan Foundation, in 1997, began to support master's-level degree programs designed to provide science, technology, engineering, and mathematics ("STEM") students with a pathway into science-based careers. These Professional Science Master's degrees combine a science or mathematics curriculum with a professional component designed to provide graduates with the necessary skills for a career in business, government, or nonprofit agencies.

Originally funding fourteen campuses, the Sloan Foundation expanded its support directly or indirectly to over fifty institutions, collectively offering over 100 different PSM programs. As of 2017, there are 356 PSM programs at over 165 institutions. In 2005, the Foundation funded the Council of Graduate Schools to be an “institutional base for PSM growth, with the goal of making the degree a normal, recognized, widely accepted academic offering”. In furtherance of this objective, the Sloan Foundation also provided support to found the National Professional Science Master's Association, a professional organization of PSM directors and alumni intended to “provide a collective voice for PSM degree programs”.

In 2007, Congress passed the America COMPETES Act which placed special emphasis on improving America's economic competitiveness by strengthening STEM education. The COMPETES Act specifically mentioned the importance of the PSM degree to the nation's overall competitiveness. Additionally, a 2008 report issued by the National Research Council of the National Academies urged the continued expansion of the PSM degree. In 2009, the National Science Foundation, under the auspices of the American Recovery and Reinvestment Act, facilitated funding of twenty-two different PSM programs by appropriating funds for a Science Master's program.

== Professional Science Master's Programs Nationwide ==
- Rutgers University
- Temple University
- New Jersey Institute of Technology
- University of Utah

== See also ==
- Degree apprenticeship, a UK program embedded in an apprenticeship

== Bibliography ==
- Alfred P. Sloan Foundation. (2008). Science Education: Professional Science Master's Degree. Retrieved August 3, 2010, from http://www.sloan.org/program/15 .
- ______________________. (2008). Professional Science Master's Degree: History. Retrieved August 3, 2010, from http://www.sloan.org/program/15/page/67 .
- Committee on Enhancing the Master's Degree in Natural Sciences. (2008). Science Professionals: Master's Education for a Competitive World. Washington, D.C.: National Research Council of the National Academies. Retrieved August 3, 2010, from http://www.nap.edu/catalog.php?record_id=12064 .
- Council of Graduate Schools. (2007). Statement on the America COMPETES Act. Retrieved August 3, 2010, from http://www.cgsnet.org/portals/0/pdf/GR_AmericaCOMPETES_0307.pdf .
- National Science Foundation. (2009). Program Solicitation: Science Master's Program. Retrieved August 3, 2010, from https://www.nsf.gov/pubs/2009/nsf09607/nsf09607.htm .
- National Professional Science Master's Association. (2010). About Us. Retrieved August 3, 2010, from http://www.npsma.org/mc/page.do?sitePageId=101812&orgId=npsma .
- Simms, Leslie. (2006). Professional Master's Education: A CGS Guide to Establishing Programs. Washington, D.C.: Council of Graduate Schools.
