= William Gray (Lord Provost) =

Scottish businessman (1928–2000)

Sir William Stevenson Gray LLD (3 May 1928 – 9 July 2000) was a 20th century Scottish business director and Chairman of Clan FM who served as Lord Provost of Glasgow from 1972 to 1975. He was Chairman of the Scottish Special Housing Association from 1966 to 1972 and also the first Chairman of the Scottish Development Agency in 1975.

== Life ==
Gray was born in Glasgow on 3 May 1928. He was educated at Hillhead High School then studied law at Glasgow University. He became a solicitor in 1958. He joined the Glasgow council in 1958 representing Yoker ward.

After his positions at SSHA he was chairman of the Clyde Tourist Association from 1972 to 1975, concurrently with his role as Lord Provost. He retired from the council in 1975 to become chairman of the SDA.

Gray was knighted by Queen Elizabeth II in June 1974.

Gray died of a heart attack on 9 July 2000 at Glasgow Western Infirmary.

== Artistic recognition ==
Gray was portrayed by painter Alan Sutherland.
