= Compulsory trade =

In Canada, a compulsory trade is a skilled trade that requires government certification of those engaged in the trade. In general, a formal training program such as an apprenticeship is required, and a practitioner must be certified as a journeyperson prior to licensure. Conversely, a voluntary trade is a trade where a certification or license is not required to practise.

In Ontario, for example, there are 23 skilled trades that are designated "compulsory" as of July 2021.
