= Nonuniversal theory =

Theory of cognitive development

Nonuniversal theory is a theory of cognitive development first created by David Henry Feldman, a professor at the Eliot-Pearson School of Child Development at Tufts University. The theory proposes that development occurs in domain-specific stages (versus the universal stages of Piaget and others). The stages are: novice, apprentice, journeyman, craftsman, expert and master.

The transition of one stage to the next is one of the core concepts of the theory. In it, development begins with the consolidation of a skill set. Outlying skills are brought closer together through integration of advanced skills or development of delayed skills. The next step is elaboration, where new skills are added. This is followed by a period of stagnation, followed by a phase in which a novel skill emerges which is more advanced than the others. This novel skill then pulls the other skills along with it in a phase called reversion. Then the process repeats itself with another stage of consolidation. This continues until the learner reaches the master level.

The drive for personal skill development doesn't always cease at this particular point, it can cease at any phase and typically ceases during a protracted stagnation phase.

== Sources ==
- Feldman, D. H. (ed.) (1994) Beyond Universals in Cognitive Development: Second Edition. Westport, Connecticut: Ablex Publishing. ISBN 1-56750-032-3 (first edition: 1980)
