= Highlands and Islands Enterprise =

Government agency in Highland, Scotland

Highlands and Islands Enterprise (HIE)
- Scottish Gaelic: Iomairt na Gàidhealtachd 's nan Eilean

Agency overview
- Formed: 1965 (as HIDB); reformed as HIE in 1991
- Preceding agency: Highland and Islands Development Board (HIBD)
- Type: Executive non-departmental public body
- Jurisdiction: Scotland
- Headquarters: An Lòchran, 10 Inverness Campus, Inverness
- Agency executives: Alistair Dodds, Chair; Stuart Black, Chief Executive
- Website: www.hie.co.uk

Highlands and Islands Enterprise (HIE; Scottish Gaelic: Iomairt na Gàidhealtachd 's nan Eilean) is the development agency for the Highlands and Islands of Scotland, an executive non-departmental public body of the Scottish Government with the role to "help build a prosperous, sustainable and inclusive economy across the Highlands and Islands, attracting more people to live, work, study, invest and visit there."

== History ==
HIE is the successor body to the Highlands and Islands Development Board (HIDB), which was launched on 1 November 1965, and was responsible for distributing government grants for economic and cultural development of the Highlands. The first chair of the HIDB was Professor Robert Grieve. Retired diplomat Sir Andrew Gilchrist was its chairman from 1970 until 1976. One strand of its work was to develop community co-operatives.

In 1991 HIDB was replaced by Highlands and Islands Enterprise, which also took over responsibilities from the Training Agency to form HIE. Iain Robertson, appointed as Chief Executive of the HIDB in 1990, continued to chair the new body. The new organisation aimed to be more decentralised, with decision making and budget control being devolved to a network of 10 Local Enterprise Companies, each with their own CEO.

A major reshaping of the organisation in 1993 saw the number of divisions reduced from seven to five. In 2008 a further major restructure occurred, with careers advice and national training programmes transferred to a new national body – Skills Development Scotland.

In 2014, HIE provided funding for the construction of the Harris distillery.

Charlotte Wright was appointed as chief executive in June 2017, after holding the position of interim chief executive since the previous August.

== Area covered by HIE ==
The area covered by HIE corresponds to International Territorial Level UKM6 (green areas on map)

The HIDB originally covered the area defined as crofting counties: Shetland, Orkney, Caithness, Sutherland, Ross-shire, Inverness-shire and Argyll. In 1975 the area covered was expanded to include the islands of Arran and Bute and those parts of the newly-formed Highland council area that were not already within its remit. In 1979 the HIDB area extended to also include the Clyde islands of Great and Little Cumbrae, and in 1986 it was extended again to cover Moray. The current areas covered by HIE are:

- Argyll and the Islands, covering Argyll and Bute except for the Helensburgh and Lomond area, plus Arran and the Cumbraes in North Ayrshire
- Highland:
  - Caithness and Sutherland
  - Inner Moray Firth (including Inverness)
  - Lochaber, Skye and Wester Ross
- Moray
- Shetland
- Orkney
- Outer Hebrides

== Strategy ==
Highlands and Islands Enterprise's approach to economic and community development centres on working to build sustainable economic growth in all parts of the region. They are guided in this by the Scottish Government Economic Strategy, and by the Scottish Economic Recovery Plan.

HIE operates across 13 offices throughout the Highlands and Islands including 10 Area Offices, from Benbecula to Forres and Lerwick to Lochgilphead.

HIE's purpose is to deliver the Scottish Government's Economic Strategy which aims to create a more successful country, with opportunities for all of Scotland to flourish, through increasing sustainable economic growth. The strategy sets five strategic objectives, for Scotland to become:

- Wealthier and fairer
- Smarter
- Healthier
- Safer and stronger
- Greener

The HIE Operating Plan outlines the investment priorities for its annual budget in line with the national economic strategy.

The Scottish Government's skills strategy, Skills for Scotland, also informs HIE's remit.

The skills strategy highlights the importance to economic growth of equipping people with skills, expertise and knowledge, and ensuring their full and productive use.

While Skills Development Scotland is the leading body in this field, HIE continues to have a strong interest in aspects of skills in the region. In particular, it supports workforce development. HIE also helped to create learning infrastructure and assisted UHI Millennium Institute in becoming the University of the Highlands and Islands. HIE are now based on the new university campus at An Lochrann.

The equivalent organisation for central and eastern Scotland is Scottish Enterprise; the development agency for the south of the country is South of Scotland Enterprise. The three development agencies jointly operate Scottish Development International, which seeks to support Scottish companies to grow their exports.
