= Skills Development Scotland =

Public body in Scotland which provides support for career advancement

- Scottish Gaelic: Leasachadh Sgilean na h-Alba

Agency overview
- Formed: 1 April 2008
- Type: Executive non-departmental public body
- Jurisdiction: Scotland
- Headquarters: Monteith House, 11 George Square, Glasgow
- Employees: 1,661 (Q1 2022)
- Annual budget: £224.2m (2022-23)
- Agency executive: Damien Yeates, Chief Executive
- Website: www.skillsdevelopmentscotland.co.uk

Skills Development Scotland (SDS) (Scottish Gaelic: Leasachadh Sgilean na h-Alba) is the national skills agency of Scotland. It is an executive non-departmental public body of the Scottish Government.

== History ==
Created on 1 April 2008, SDS is a merger of former organisations and services which delivered skills related services across Scotland.

The former organisations or services that now make up SDS are:

- Careers Scotland
- Elements of Scottish Enterprise's skills function
- Elements of Highlands & Islands Enterprise's skills function
- Scottish University for Industry (learndirect Scotland, learndirect Scotland for business, ILA Scotland and The Big Plus)
- Training for Work
- Skillseekers
- Modern Apprenticeships
- Graduate Apprenticeships

In 2010, the agency found itself facing funding cuts of more than £20 million and needing to find 125 voluntary redundancies, one tenth of its workforce.

== Structure ==
Skills Development Scotland has a presence in most major towns across Scotland.

== The Big Plus ==
The Big Plus is an awareness raising campaign in Scotland targeting adults who might be unable to achieve their aspirations due to a lack of literacy and/or numeracy skills. Formerly part of the Scottish University for Industry, it is now part of Skills Development Scotland.

Adults who respond to the media promotion are put in touch with a local learning provider where they are invited to participate in a program of personal, dedicated learning activities at a local centre. The program aims to help participants reach a level of skills that will enable them to actively engage, with confidence, in personal, family, community and work life. Learning programs are provided by Scottish local authorities and are free to resident applicants.
