= Business Link =

UK government-funded business advice and guidance service

- Formation: 1992
- Legal status: Non-profit service
- Purpose: Business support in England
- Location: England, in up to 89 regional offices
- Region served: England
- Budget: £105m (over 3 years)

Business Link was a government-funded business advice and guidance service established in England in 1992. It consisted of an online portal managed by HM Revenue and Customs (HMRC) and a national telephone helpline.

The service's network of local and regional advisors (under the auspices of the Department for Business, Innovation and Skills) was axed in 2011. The online portal was replaced (along with Directgov) by the Gov.uk website on 17 October 2012, although migration of all services to Gov.uk branding took several years and the telephone helpline was retained for some time.

This government programme is not to be confused with Business Link Magazine Group, a magazine publisher founded in 1988.

== Origins and launch ==
The concept for Business Link was established in 1992 by Michael Heseltine, then President of the Board of Trade, when he was in charge of the Department of Trade and Industry. The initiative was at first referred to as "One Stop Shop", and was launched as Business Link in December 1992. It replaced a number of services which were considered to be fragmented, such as the Department of Employment's 'Small business development service'.

At the time, research led the government to believe small businesses were reluctant to invest in growth, that they failed to plan ahead and invest in training, that they were swamped with paperwork and relied on too few customers. These barriers to growth were the driving forces behind the need for the new service.

Previously, the Enterprise Initiative ran from 1988 to 1994. This government-funded scheme was designed to encourage take-up of external advice (consultancy) by small businesses, by offering grant incentives. During this three-year period applications were received from 135,700 businesses. A Wren and Storey report concluded that £1,000 of grant assistance increased sales in a business by £30,000 and created a new job. An alternative study by Bennett and Robson estimated that take-up of external advice trebled in small businesses with the incentive of grant provision. The Enterprise Initiative compounded support for intervention in the small business market place.

In 2011, Heseltine said "I knew that there were very large numbers of small and medium sized enterprises out there who were running on the most rudimentary systems. If they had a problem, many of them didn't come from a background where they knew of anyone who could help or advise them. We wanted a team of people who could hold their hand, listen to their problems, have a working knowledge of what business is about, make suggestions, ask questions and be a friend in need."

=== Resistance ===
Despite being a Conservative-sponsored initiative with apparent cross party support, the proposal for a government-funded "one stop shop" immediately hit political resistance.

Reflecting on this period in 2011, Heseltine stated that "you would have the left wing, which wouldn't have any real interest in effective management of the capitalist system. And you would have a very powerful element on the right wing of politics that would think it's a matter for the capitalist system to manage itself and government intervention, as they would call it, would be very unattractive. In truth, when I did it, I did comprehensive presentations to Conservative back benchers so that they could see what I believed an industrial policy was about. What they felt it was likely to be about were things like backing winners, or subsidising losers. Now I wasn't in favour of certainly the latter, but once I had done the presentations, I had no complaints."

Initially, Heseltine approached the private sector to deliver a Business Link type service, specifically the British Chambers of Commerce. However, these meetings were unsuccessful. The reasons for this failure are disputed, however Heseltine stated that Chambers "should have set up this combined advisory service. They should have gone to Government and said, look you've got all these services, work with us and create the one stop shop. That's what they should have done. We did it for them. I think they regarded Business Link as an intrusion into their fiefdom. But the reason we created Business Link was because the Chambers weren't doing a good enough job. So there was tension there from the beginning."

=== Creation and evolution of the network ===
The Department of Trade (DTI) predicted 54 Business Links would launch by the end of 1993. Progress was much slower than anticipated due to each bidder and proposal having to be evaluated by a National Assessment Panel. Achieving and maintaining the ISO 9001 Quality Management Standard and Investors in People accreditation was a mandatory requirement, and each successful Business Link operator was granted a three-year license. By the end of 1993 (during which time the government spent some £3m on the programme), only three branches of the service had been formed. The first opened in Leicester on 27 September 1993, with others following in Birmingham and Congleton. Halfway through 1994 only 21 Business Link operators were in place.

At the end of 1996 the national roll-out was complete. At its peak, Business Link operated through 89 regional offices employing 650 personal business advisors.

In 2005, administration of Business Link services was transferred to the regional development agencies, who mostly chose to contract business support out to private companies.

=== Reception ===
The Business Link network employed personal business advisors (PBAs), who worked primarily with businesses that employed between 10 and 249 people (small and medium-sized enterprises). In February 1996, the Institute of Directors published a research paper stating that their members were worried about the declared focus on growth businesses employing between 10 and 249, because this might hurt smaller businesses and disadvantage start ups. However, contrary to popular belief at the time, businesses of all sizes were able to access Business Link services from the start. In November 1996, Richard Page, the Minister for Small Business, Industry and Energy, stated in the House of Commons that he was "disturbed to hear that the impression has been given that we are not there to help all businesses irrespective of size. My clear message is that Business Link is there to help any business man or woman, irrespective of size of company, because from little acorns grow the big oak trees".

This contradiction may be explained by the DTI directive requiring the individual new Business Link partnerships to generate at least 25% of their income from outside central government within five years of launch, with the express advice that the most likely source would be the end consumers. As a result, the Business Links wanted their PBAs to work with growth-oriented businesses but this proved difficult to enforce and implement.

PBAs were recruited from those who ran businesses. At first some were self-employed earning commission but this did not prove to be self-sustaining.

== Services ==
=== Regional network ===
Business Link's face-to-face service operated on a regional basis across England and was funded by the relevant regional development agencies (RDAs). The service used an IDBT (information, diagnostic, brokerage and transaction) model to advise businesses. Regional Business Links ran a variety of events and workshops on topical issues and general business skills.

The service was evaluated on a number of occasions. These assessments generally found positive impacts of Business Link on companies that received advice. However, some commentators worried about the cost of Business Link and the variability of advice. Some of the Business Links were chosen to provide more intensive support to fewer companies and these seemed to do comparatively well. Other Business Links showed less success with a 'spreading the jam thinly' model.

The Business Link regional advisory service offered advice and support to businesses until November 2011. It was then abolished along with the regional development agencies, although the Business Link website and the national helpline continued to operate. Local enterprise partnerships (LEPs) were expected to drive regional economic growth in the absence of the Business Link regional advisory service.

Various business link companies have engaged in direct competition with the private sector and with governmental organisations such as ACAS. This includes the provision of employment law advice direct to businesses via cold calling, mail shots, emails and their websites. However, evaluations of Business Link showed that those taking advice from Business Link were thereafter more likely to work with private consultants as they learned about the benefits of advice.

=== Website ===
The Business Link website in September 2012

The Business Link website was launched in May 2004 as part of the Transformational Government programme (an initiative to consolidate UK government websites). It was administered by the private company Serco on behalf of the government. In 2010 a report from the Central Office of Information found that the site's annual costs were £35m, and it had around 1.2 million users.

Information on the site came in the form of guides (pages of text information), interactive tools (in which businesses could get personalized information) and transactions (in which businesses could for example, calculate their VAT).

== Closure ==
Despite the evidence that the advisers were the most effective part of Business Link, the Cameron–Clegg coalition, elected in 2010, declared their intention to abolish the regional business adviser programmes. New local enterprise partnerships would take their place but the national website and telephone service would continue.

The website was replaced by the Gov.uk public information website on 17 October 2012. Content was migrated to the new website, maintaining previous links to redirect users. Several online services continued, largely unchanged, for a number of years: examples included Contracts Finder (until late 2014) and the Universal Jobmatch service for employers (until at least 2016).

== Similar services ==
Business Link only operated in England. The remainder of the UK still has similar regional services:

- Business Gateway, Scotland
- NIbusinessinfo.co.uk, Northern Ireland (run by Invest Northern Ireland)
- Business Wales

Regional providers used a rebranded version of the Business Link website. The Northern Ireland website retained for a time the vast majority of the Business Link website information.

Most OECD countries provide similar services although they may organise them differently. Examples are the SBDC in the US and ALMI in Sweden.

== See also ==
- Federation of Small Businesses
