= Apprenticeship =

Training for trades

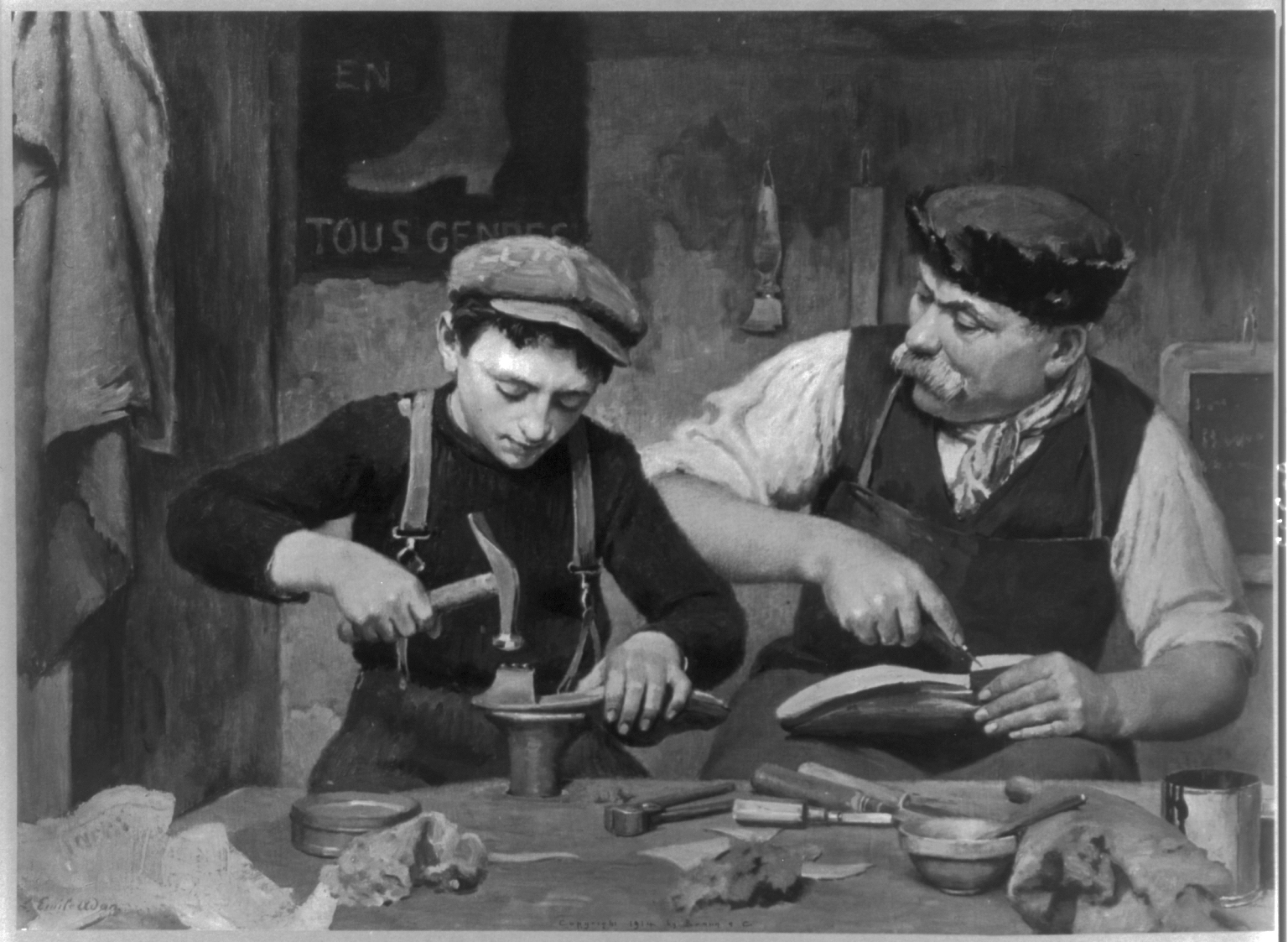
A shoemaker and his apprentice c. 1914

Electricians are often trained through apprenticeships.

Apprenticeship is a system for training potential new practitioners of a trade or profession with on-the-job training and often some accompanying study. Apprenticeships may also enable practitioners to gain a license to practice in a regulated occupation. Most of their training is done while working for an experienced employer who helps the apprentices learn their trade or profession, in exchange for their continued labor for an agreed period after they have achieved measurable competencies.

Apprenticeship lengths vary significantly across sectors, professions, roles and cultures. In some cases, people who successfully complete an apprenticeship can reach the "journeyman" or professional certification level of competence. In other cases, they can be offered a permanent job at the company that provided the placement. Although the formal boundaries and terminology of the apprentice/journeyman/master system often do not extend outside guilds and trade unions, the concept of on-the-job training leading to competence over a period of years is found in any field of skilled labor.

== Terminology ==
There is no global consensus on a single term for apprenticeship. Depending on the culture, country and sector, the same or similar definitions are used to describe the terms apprenticeship, internship, and trainee-ship. The latter two terms may be preferred in the health sector. One example is internships in medicine for physicians and trainee-ships for nurses – and western countries. Apprenticeship is the preferred term of the European Commission and the one selected for use by the European Center for the Development of Vocational Training (CEDEFOP), which has developed many studies on the subject. Some non-European countries adapt European apprenticeship practices.

== History ==
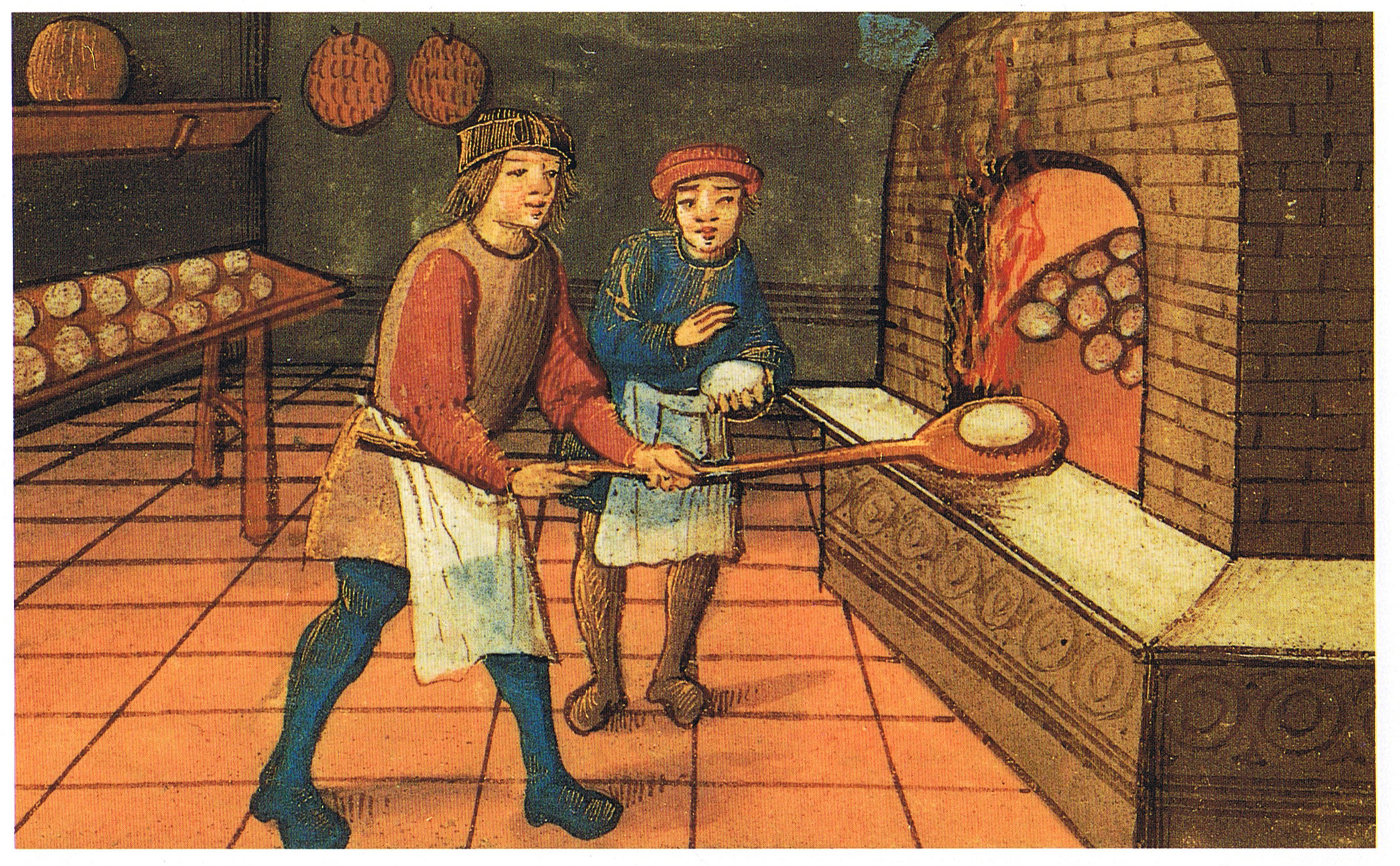
A medieval baker with his apprentice. The Bodleian Library, Oxford, England.

Apprenticeship existed in the classical world, and early contracts survive on papyrii from Egypt in 18 B.C. The system of apprenticeship is again visible in Europe from the twelfth century, when apprenticeship contracts survive in Genoa. In the Late Middle Ages, apprenticeship in some parts of Europe came to be supervised by craft guilds and town governments. A master craftsman was entitled to employ young people as an inexpensive form of labour in exchange for providing food, lodging and formal training in the craft. Most apprentices were males, but female apprentices were found in crafts such as seamstress, tailor, cordwainer, baker and stationer. Apprentices usually began at ten to fifteen years of age, and would live in the master craftsman's household. The contract between the craftsman, the apprentice and, generally, the apprentice's parents would often be governed by an indenture. Most apprentices aspired to becoming master craftsmen themselves on completion of their contract (which varied widely from two to seven or more years), but some would spend time as a journeyman and a significant proportion would never acquire their own workshop. In Coventry those completing seven-year apprenticeships with stuff merchants were entitled to become freemen of the city.

Apprenticeship was adopted into military of the West African kingdom of Dahomey. Soldiers in the army were recruited as young as seven or eight years old, as they initially served as shield carriers for regular soldiers. After years of apprenticeship and military experience, the recruits were allowed to join the army as regular soldiers. With a combination of lifelong military experience and monetary incentives, a cohesive and well-disciplined military emerged in Dahomey.

== Types ==
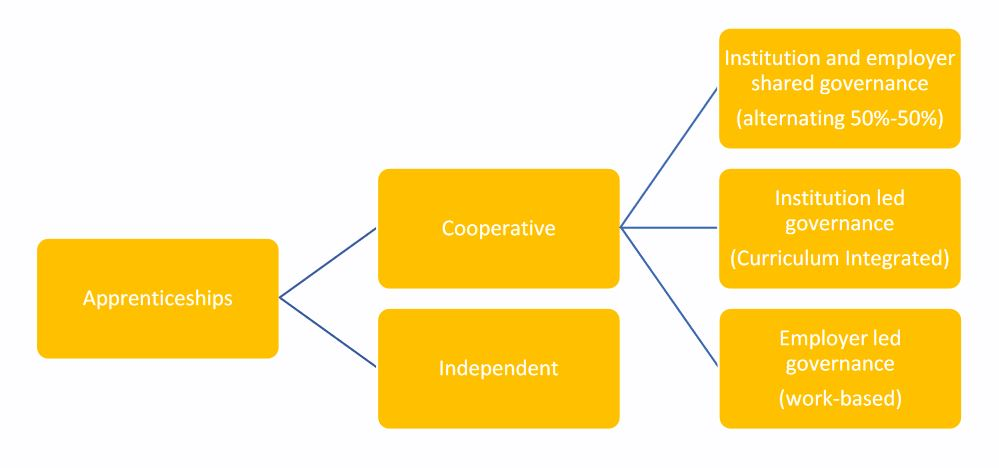
Typology of Apprenticeships

Apprenticeships can be divided into two main categories: independent and cooperative.

Independent apprenticeships are those organized and managed by employers, without any involvement from educational institutions or link to an educational curriculum. Apprentices may be in an education program at the same time, but there is no formal relation between the studies and the apprenticeship.

Cooperative apprenticeships are those organized and managed in cooperation between educational institutions and employers. They are always associated with a curriculum, and are designed as a means for students to put theory into practice, and to gain knowledge in a way that supports professional autonomy.

Cooperative apprenticeships can further vary in terms of governance, with some being led more by the employer and others more by educational institutions. Below is a summary of the main characteristics of the various types by governance:

Governance type	Education level	Program type	Average length	Balance theory/practice	Location of learning	Contract
Institution and Employer shared Governance	ISCED 6	Institution- & work-integrated	3–4 years	Alternating theory & practice (50%–50%)	Institution- & work-integrated	Yes
Institution led Governance (long cycle)	ISCED 6	Higher Vocational Education, Professional Higher Education, Higher Education	2–3 years	Short placements from few weeks to 6 months	Institution- & work-integrated	Yes
Institution led Governance (short cycle)	ISCED 6	Higher Vocational Education, Professional Higher Education, Higher Education	2–3 years	Placements from 30 to 40% of the curriculum	Institution- & work-integrated	Yes
Employer led Governance	ISCED 5–6	Higher Vocational Education, Professional Higher Education	1 year	Employed for a minimum of 30 hours per week, 20% of learning hours must be off-the-job	Work-based	Yes

== Apprenticeship systems worldwide ==
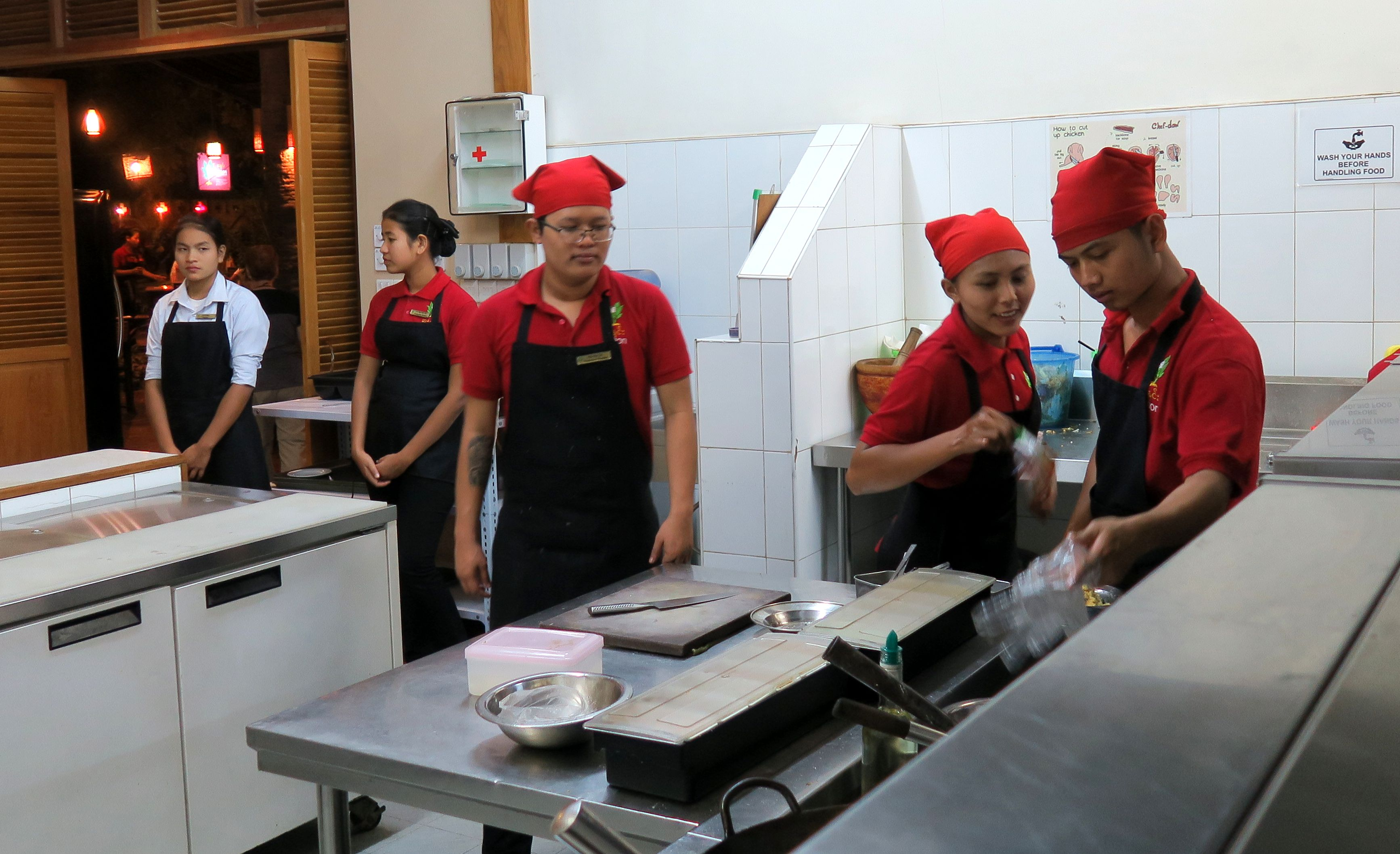
Students in a vocational training restaurant, Bagan (Myanmar)

=== Australia ===
Australian apprenticeships encompass all apprenticeships and traineeships covering all industry sectors in Australia and are used to achieve both entry-level training and mid-career upskilling objectives. There were 475,000 Australian apprentices in-training as at 31 March 2012, an increase of 2.4% from the previous year. Australian government employer and employee incentives may be applicable, while state and territory governments may provide public funding support for the training element of the initiative. Australian apprenticeships combine time at work with formal training and can be full-time, part-time or school-based.

Australian apprentice and traineeship services promote retention, so the trainees are matched with employers using aptitude tests, tips, and information guides. Information and resources on potential apprenticeship and traineeship occupations are available in over sixty industries.

The distinction between the terms "apprentices" and "trainees" lies mainly around traditional trades and the time it takes to gain a qualification. The Australian government uses Australian apprenticeship centres to administer and facilitate Australian apprenticeships so that funding can be disseminated to eligible businesses, apprentices and trainees, supporting the whole process as it underpins the future skills of Australian industry. Australia also has a safety net in place for businesses and Australian apprentices with its group Training scheme. This is where businesses that are not able to employ the Australian apprentice for the full period until they qualify, are able to lease or hire the Australian apprentice from a group training organisation. It is a safety net, because the group training organisation is the employer and provides continuity of employment and training for the Australian apprentices.

In addition, group training organisations (GTO) have other benefits such as additional support for both the Host employer and the trainee/apprentice through an industry consultant who visits regularly to make sure that the trainee/apprentice are fulfilling their work and training obligations with their host employer. There is the additional benefit of the trainee/apprentice being employed by the GTO reducing the payroll/superannuation and other legislative requirements on the host employer who pays as invoiced per agreement.

=== Austria ===
Apprenticeship training in Austria is organized in a school system with long-term training parts. It is thus possible to get the Matura needed to enter university. WIFI company-based training of apprentices is complemented by compulsory attendance of a part-time vocational school for apprentices (Berufsschule). It lasts two to four years – the duration varies among the 250 legally recognized apprenticeship trades.

About 40 percent of all Austrian teenagers enter apprenticeship training upon completion of compulsory education (at age 15). This number has been stable since the 1950s.

The five most popular trades are: Retail Salesperson (5,000 people complete this apprenticeship per year), clerk (3,500 / year), car mechanic (2,000 / year), hairdresser (1,700 / year), cook (1,600 / year). There are many smaller trades with small numbers of apprentices, e.g. "EDV-Systemtechniker" (Sysadmin), which is completed by fewer than 100 people a year.

The Apprenticeship Leave Certificate provides the apprentice with access to two different vocational careers. On the one hand, it is a prerequisite for the admission to the Master Craftsman Exam and for qualification tests, and on the other hand it gives access to higher education via the TVE-Exam or the Higher Education Entrance Exam which are prerequisites for taking up studies at colleges, universities, "Fachhochschulen", post-secondary courses and post-secondary colleges.

The person responsible for overseeing the training inside the company is called "Lehrherr" or "Ausbilder". An Ausbilder must prove that he has the professional qualifications needed to educate another person, has no criminal record and is an otherwise-respectable person. The law states that "the person wanting to educate a young apprentice must prove that he has an ethical way of living and the civic qualities of a good citizen".

=== Canada ===
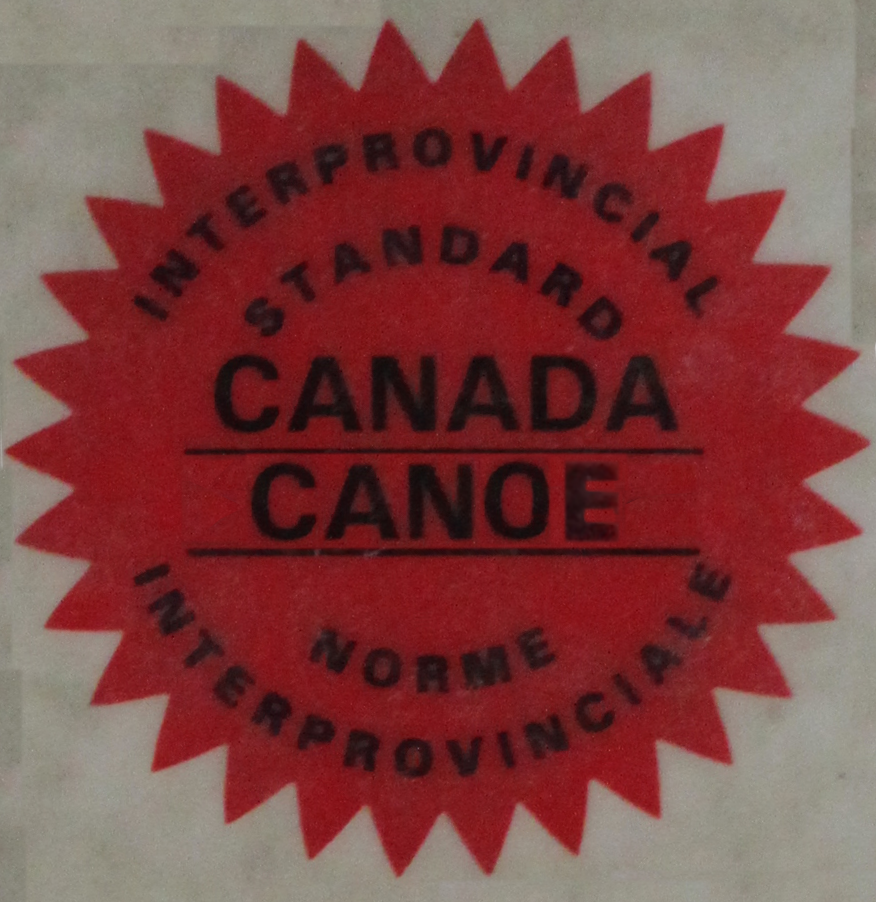
Canadian Inter-provincial 'Red Seal' certification (License number was replaced with the word 'CANOE'.)

In Canada, apprenticeships tend to be formalized for craft trades and technician level qualifications. At the completion of the provincial exam, they may write the Provincial Standard exam. British Columbia is one province that uses these exams as the provincial exam. This means a qualification for the province will satisfy the whole country. The inter-provincial exam questions are agreed upon by all provinces of the time. At the time there were only four provinces, Nova Scotia, New Brunswick, Upper Canada (now Ontario), and Lower Canada (now Quebec).

In Canada, each province has its own apprenticeship program, which may be the only route into jobs within compulsory trades.

Organisations such as the Canadian Council of Directors of Apprenticeship and Employment and Social Development Canada help to oversee the programmes.

=== Czech Republic ===
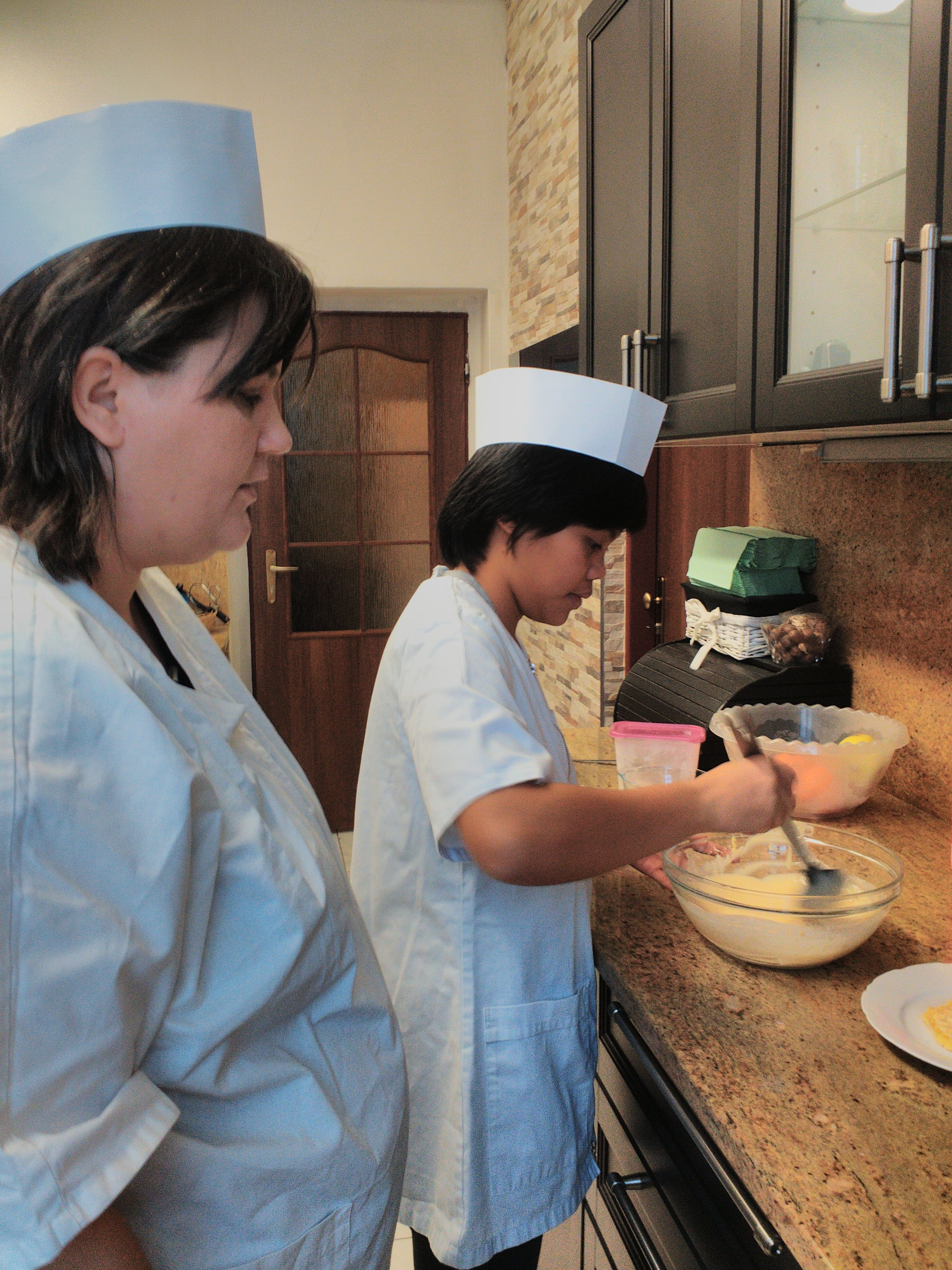
Cook with her apprentice, Euroinstitut vocational school, Czech Republic

In the Czech Republic, the term "vocational school" (učiliště) can refer to the two, three or four years of secondary practical education. Apprenticeship Training is implemented under Education Act (školský zákon). Apprentices spend about 30–60% of their time in companies (sociální partneři školy) and the rest in formal education. Depending on the profession, they may work for two to three days a week in the company and then spend two or three days at a vocational school.

=== France ===
In France, apprenticeships also developed between the ninth and thirteenth centuries, with French guilds structured around apprentices, journeymen and master craftsmen, continuing in this way until 1791, when the guilds were suppressed.

The first laws regarding apprenticeships were passed in 1851. From 1919, young people had to take 150 hours of theory and general lessons in their subject a year. This minimum training time rose to 360 hours a year in 1961, then 400 in 1986.

The first training centres for apprentices (centres de formation d'apprentis, CFAs) appeared in 1961, and in 1971 apprenticeships were legally made part of professional training. In 1986 the age limit for beginning an apprenticeship was raised from 20 to 25. From 1987 the range of qualifications achievable through an apprenticeship was widened to include the brevet professionnel (certificate of vocational aptitude), the bac professionnel (vocational baccalaureate diploma), the brevet de technicien supérieur (advanced technician's certificate), engineering diplomas, master's degree and more.

On January 18, 2005, President Jacques Chirac announced the introduction of a law on a programme for social cohesion comprising the three pillars of employment, housing and equal opportunities. The French government pledged to further develop apprenticeship as a path to success at school and to employment, based on its success: in 2005, 80% of young French people who had completed an apprenticeship entered employment. In France, the term apprenticeship often denotes manual labor but it also includes other jobs like secretary, manager, engineer, shop assistant... The plan aimed to raise the number of apprentices from 365,000 in 2005 to 500,000 in 2009. To achieve this aim, the government is, for example, granting tax relief for companies when they take on apprentices. (Since 1925 a tax has been levied to pay for apprenticeships.) The minister in charge of the campaign, Jean-Louis Borloo, also hoped to improve the image of apprenticeships with an information campaign, as they are often connected with academic failure at school and an ability to grasp only practical skills and not theory. After the civil unrest end of 2005, the government, led by prime minister Dominique de Villepin, announced a new law. Dubbed "law on equality of chances", it created the First Employment Contract as well as manual apprenticeship from 14 years of age. From this age, students are allowed to quit the compulsory school system in order to quickly learn a vocation.

=== Germany ===
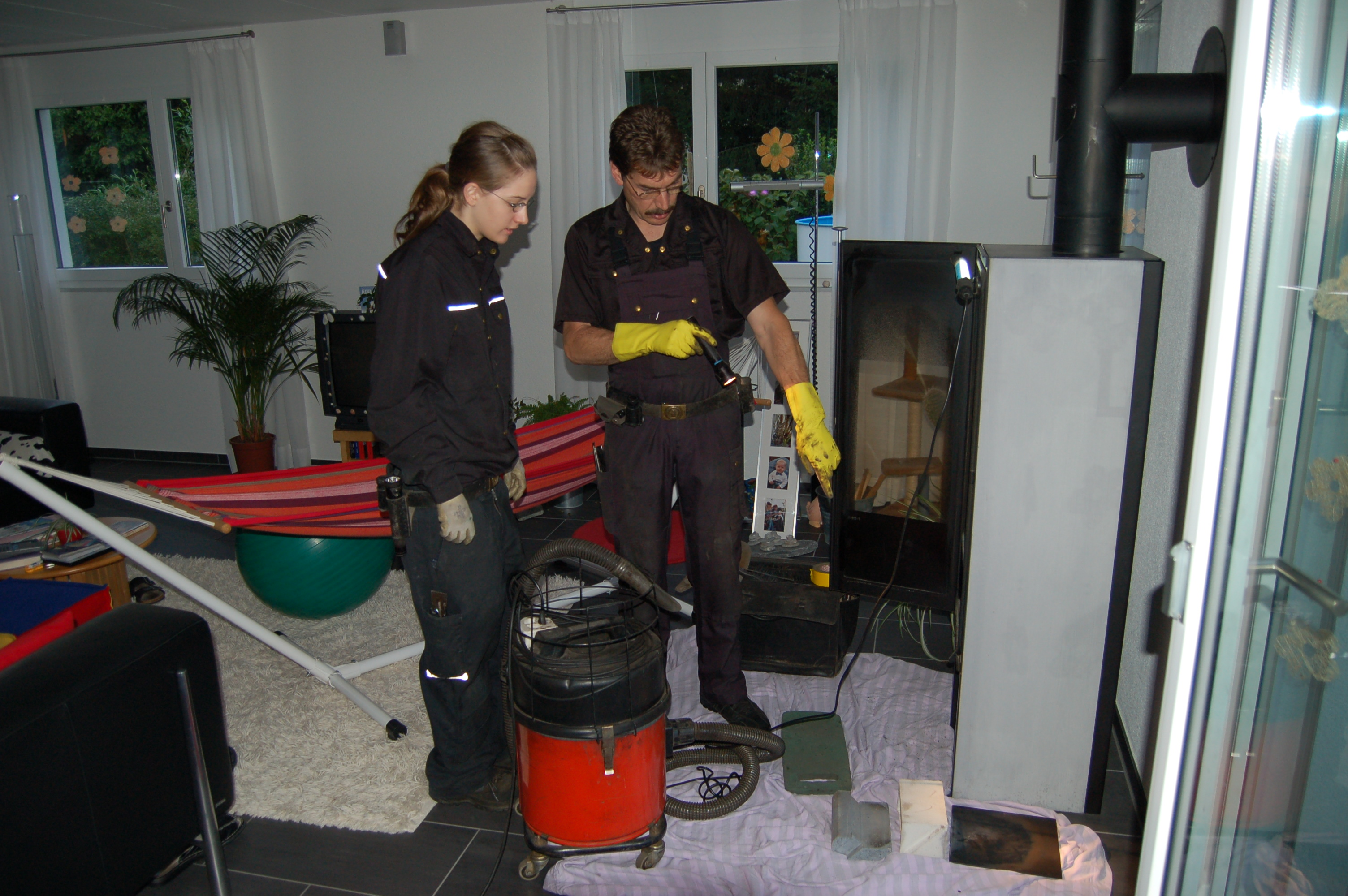
A master chimney sweep and apprentice in 2008

Apprenticeships are part of Germany's dual education system, which combines a practical education in a company and a theoretical one in a vocational school. The lessons in vocational school can either happen once or twice a week, or in whole week blocks. During their apprenticeship, apprentices can earn a salary, which gets higher every year, with the average apprentice earning €1,066 before taxes. The average apprenticeship takes between 2 and 3.5 years. As of 2024, there are 327 officially recognized apprenticeship trades.

=== India ===
In India, the Apprentices Act was enacted in 1961. It regulates the programme of training of apprentices in the industry so as to conform to the syllabi, period of training etc. as laid down by the Central Apprenticeship Council and to utilise fully the facilities available in industry for imparting practical training with a view to meeting the requirements of skilled manpower for industry.

The Apprentices Act enacted in 1961 and was implemented effectively in 1962. Initially, the Act envisaged training of trade apprentices. The Act was amended in 1973 to include training of graduate and diploma engineers as "Graduate" & "Technician" Apprentices. The Act was further amended in 1986 to bring within its purview the training of the 10+2 vocational stream as "Technician (Vocational)" Apprentices.

==== Responsibility of implementing Apprentices Act ====
Overall responsibility is with the Directorate General of Employment & Training (DGE&T) in the Union Ministry of Skill Development and Entrepreneurship.

- For Trades Apprentices (ITI-Passed/Fresher): DGE&T is also responsible for implementation of the Act in respect of Trade Apprentices in the Central Govt. Undertakings & Departments. This is done through six Regional Directorates of Apprenticeship Training located at Kolkata, Mumbai, Chennai, Hyderabad, Kanpur and Faridabad. While State Apprenticeship Advisers are responsible for implementation of the Act in respect of Trade Apprentices in State Government Undertakings/ Departments and Private Establishments.
- For Graduate, Technician (Polytechnic Diploma holder) and Technician (H.S Vocational-Passed) Apprentices: Department of Education in the Ministry of Human Resource Development is responsible for implementation of the through four Boards of Apprenticeship Training located at Chennai, Kanpur, Kolkata and Mumbai.

=== Ireland ===
In Ireland the apprenticeships are split into two main categories: "craft" and "new". The main craft trades and professions have been designated by SOLAS and come within the scope of the Statutory Apprenticeship system, which is organised by SOLAS in co-operation with the Department of Education, employers and unions. An Apprenticeship Council is also in place. An apprenticeship provides on-the-job training with an employer. It usually alternates between off-the-job training in an education centre and on-the-job training at an employer's workplace. An apprenticeship generally lasts for 4 years, during which time there are 3 different periods in off-the-job training. This training phase takes place in an Education and Training Board (ETB) Training Centre while the subsequent off-the-job training phases take place in an Institute of Technology. After on-going assessments through on-the-job competence testing as well as off-the-job modular assessments and examinations, if passed successfully the apprentice is awarded an Advanced Certificate in craft (level 6 on the National Framework of Qualifications).

New apprenticeships in other areas of industry were introduced from 2016, and can lead to an award between Levels 5–10 on the National Framework of Qualifications. Each apprenticeship programme lasts between 2 and 4 years. Industry-led groups which work with education and training providers and other partners, oversee the development and roll-out of new apprenticeships. New apprenticeships in ICT, finance and hospitality include software development, accounting technician and commis chef.

=== Liberia ===
In Liberia, tailor apprenticeships engage with more skilled tailors to learn the craft and the skills that may be taught in more traditional school settings. They learn from master tailors, which gives the apprentices a promised job once their training is completed. Apprentices must have a grasp on patterns, measurement, and other mathematics skills. They demonstrate full concept mastery before moving on to the next piece of clothing. Instead of formal testing for evaluation, articles of clothing must meet the quality standards before they can be sold and before the apprentice can begin a new design.

=== Nigeria ===
The Igbo apprentice system is a framework of formal and informal indentured agreements between parties that ultimately facilitate burgeoning entrepreneurial communities within the Igbos. It is an economic model practiced widely by Igbos and originated in South-Eastern Nigeria. Its purposes were and still remains to spur economic growth and stability, and sustainable livelihood by financing and investing in human resources through vocational training.

=== Pakistan ===
In Pakistan, apprenticeship training is implemented under the National Apprenticeship Ordinance 1962 and Apprenticeship Rules 1966, which regulate programs across industries in conjunction with Technical and Vocational Education and Training (TVET) institutes. For companies with over fifty workers in apprenticeable trades, it is mandatory to do apprenticeship training. All costs, including wages, are covered by the industry. Enforcement is carried out by provincial governments through various TEVTAs, such as Punjab TEVTA, Sindh TEVTA, KP TEVTA, Balochistan TEVTA, and AJK TEVTA.

The training period varies by trade, from one to four years. As of 2015, more than 30,000 apprentices were being trained in 2,751 industries across 276 trades. This accounts for less than 10% of the over 350,000 institution-based vocational trainees produced annually.

The Government of Pakistan, through the National Vocational & Technical Training Commission, has begun reforms to modernize the apprenticeship system. Key aspects include:

- Expansion into services, agriculture, and mining sectors
- Cost-sharing between the industry and government
- Formalization of informal apprenticeships
- Alignment with the National Vocational Qualifications Framework (Pakistan NVQF)
- Increased female participation
- Financial incentives for industries exceeding apprentice requirements
- Joint assessment and certification by the industry, Chamber of Commerce, and government

=== Switzerland ===
In Switzerland, after the end of compulsory schooling, two thirds of young people follow a vocational training. Ninety percent of them are in the dual education system.

Switzerland has an apprenticeship similarly to Germany and Austria. The educational system is ternar, which is basically dual education system with mandatory practical courses. The length of an apprenticeship can be 2, 3 or 4 years.

==== Length ====
Apprenticeships with a length of 2 years are for persons with weaker school results. The certificate awarded after successfully completing a 2-year apprenticeship is called "Attestation de formation professionnelle" (AFP) in French, "Eidgenössisches Berufsattest" (EBA) in German and "Certificato federale di formazione pratica" (CFP) in Italian. It could be translated as "Attestation of professional formation".

Apprenticeship with a length of 3 or 4 years are the most common ones. The certificate awarded after successfully completing a 3 or 4-year apprenticeship is called "Certificat Fédéral de Capacité" (CFC) in French, "Eidgenössisches Fähigkeitszeugnis" (EFZ) in German and "Attestato federale di capacità" (AFC) in Italian. It could be translated as "Federal Certificate of Proficiency".

Some crafts, such as electrician, are educated in lengths of 3 and 4 years. In this case, an Electrician with 4 years apprenticeship gets more theoretical background than one with 3 years apprenticeship. Some languages have different names for a craft depending on the length of the apprenticeship; this can be lost in translation.

Each of the over 300 nationwide defined vocational profiles has defined framework – conditions as length of education, theoretical and practical learning goals and certification conditions.

==== Age of the apprentices ====
Typically an apprenticeship can commence for individuals once they are aged 15 or 18 after finishing general education. Some apprenticeships have a recommend or required age of 18. There is formally no maximum age, however, for persons above 21 it is hard to find a company due to companies preferring younger ages due to the lower cost of labour.

=== Turkey ===
In Turkey, apprenticeship has been part of the small business culture for centuries since the time of Seljuk Turks who claimed Anatolia as their homeland in the 11th century.

There are three levels of apprenticeship. The first level is the apprentice, i.e., the "çırak" in Turkish. The second level is pre-master which is called, "kalfa" in Turkish. The mastery level is called as "usta" and is the highest level of achievement. An 'usta' is eligible to take in and accept new 'ciraks' to train and bring them up. The training process usually starts when the small boy is of age 10–11 and becomes a full-grown master at the age of 20–25. Many years of hard work and disciplining under the authority of the master is the key to the young apprentice's education and learning process.

In Turkey today there are many vocational schools that train children to gain skills to learn a new profession. The student after graduation looks for a job at the nearest local marketplace usually under the authority of a master.

=== United Kingdom ===
Welsh Government video: case study; 2016

Apprenticeships in the United Kingdom have a long tradition, with records dating back to around the 12th century. Apprenticeships were flourishing in English towns and villages by the 14th century and were the main source of training in manufacturing and service occupations until the nineteenth century. Apprenticeship declined during and after the Industrial Revolution as other forms of on-the-job training within the new firms and factories expanded, and a larger share of manufacturing work became low or semi-skilled. In modern times, apprenticeships were formalised in 1964 by act of parliament and they continue to be in widespread use in all four nations, with hundreds of apprenticeships to choose from.

=== United States ===
Apprenticeship offices in the United States

Apprenticeship programs in the United States are regulated by the Smith–Hughes Act (1917), The National Industrial Recovery Act (1933), and National Apprenticeship Act, also known as the "Fitzgerald Act."

The number of American apprentices has increased from 375,000 in 2014 to 500,000 in 2016, while the federal government intends to see 750,000 by 2019, particularly by expanding the apprenticeship model to include white-collar occupations such as information technology.

== Analogues at universities and professional development ==
The modern concept of an internship is similar to an apprenticeship but not as rigorous. Universities still use apprenticeship schemes in their production of scholars: bachelors are promoted to masters and then produce a thesis under the oversight of a supervisor before the corporate body of the university recognises the achievement of the standard of a doctorate. Another view of this system is of graduate students in the role of apprentices, post-doctoral fellows as journeymen, and professors as masters . In the "Wealth of Nations" Adam Smith states that:

Seven years seem anciently to have been, all over Europe, the usual term established for the duration of apprenticeships in the greater part of incorporated trades. All such incorporations were anciently called universities, which indeed is the proper Latin name for any incorporation whatever. The university of smiths, the university of tailors, etc., are expressions which we commonly meet with in the old charters of ancient towns [...] As to have wrought seven years under a master properly qualified was necessary in order to entitle any person to become a master, and to have himself apprenticed in a common trade; so to have studied seven years under a master properly qualified was necessary to entitle him to become a master, teacher, or doctor (words anciently synonymous) in the liberal arts, and to have scholars or apprentices (words likewise originally synonymous) to study under him.

Also similar to apprenticeships are the professional development arrangements for new graduates in the professions of accountancy, engineering, management consulting, and the law. A British example was training contracts known as 'articles of clerkship'. The learning curve in modern professional service firms, such as law firms, consultancies or accountancies, generally resembles the traditional master-apprentice model: the newcomer to the firm is assigned to one or several more experienced colleagues (ideally partners in the firm) and learns their skills on the job.

== In fiction ==
A bildungsroman is a literary genre that focuses on the psychological and moral growth and change of the protagonist from childhood to adulthood (coming of age). The birth of the bildungsroman is normally dated to the publication of Wilhelm Meister's Apprenticeship by Johann Wolfgang von Goethe in 1795–96.

== See also ==
- Apprenticeship levy
- Apprentices mobility
- Career and technical education
- Apprenticeship in freemasonry
- Education
- Educational theory of apprenticeship
- Experiential learning
- Dual education system
- German model
- Guru-disciple tradition
- Indentured servitude
- Mentorship
- Nonuniversal theory
- School-to-work transition
- Trainee
- Tradesman
- Vocational education

== Sources ==
- Bakhtin, Mikhail (1996). "The Bildungsroman and its Significance in the History of Realism". In Emerson, Caryl; Holquist, Michael (eds.). Speech Genres and Other Late Essays. Austin, TX: University of Texas Press. pp. 10–59. ISBN 978-0-292-79256-2. OCLC 956882417.
- Jeffers, Thomas L. (2005). Apprenticeships: The Bildungsroman from Goethe to Santayana. New York: Palgrave. ISBN 1-4039-6607-9.
- Lynch, Jack (1999). "Glossary of Literary and Rhetorical Terms". Guide to Literary Terms. Rutgers University. Archived from the original on 5 August 2011.
