= Australian Ranger Federation =

The Australian Ranger Federation represents Australian park rangers.

== History ==
The Australian Ranger Association (ARA) was formed in Adelaide, South Australia in 1996 to provide representation and a national approach to the Rangers profession within Australia. The ARA focused on setting industry national standards for protected areas; professional networks; sharing of training, endorsement of specific standout providers; social networks for moral boosting and renewed energy. Individual state/territory ranger bodies generally started as industrial organisations but slowly over time and through engagement at a national level morphed to more professional level. The growing representation in each state/territory of separate industrial organisations allowed the ARA to develop representation on professional issues.

The ARA was renamed into the Australian Ranger Federation in 2004. This change was made to better reflect the professional focus of the organisation and more closely affiliate with the International Ranger Federation (IRF). The description of Federation in the title was also considered to better represent the ideals of members. The Australian Rangers Federation developed a network and provided a forum for rangers to communication on professional issues.

Each state and territory progressively established its own association, and directly affiliated with the IRF. The operations of the Australian Rangers Federation become duplicated and obsolete. The ARF was further renamed into the Council of Australian Ranger Associations (CARA) at the Queensland Rangers Association AGM in 2008, re-establish itself the principle professional body representing people that work in the conservation of natural and cultural heritage on conserved lands. Many of the state and territory association retain close links with industrial organisations, government conservation agencies, and NGO’s.

== Purpose ==
The Australian Ranger Association (ARA) was established to provide representation and a national approach to the Rangers profession within Australia. The association was successful in establishing a national network that enabled Rangers to communicate directly and discuss industrial and professional workplace issues.

The Australian Rangers Federation (ARF) was a professional body supporting Rangers and other professional officers involved in the conservation and management of our natural and cultural resources. The ARF represents its members at an international level through the International Ranger Federation (IRF). Membership to the ARF provided automatic membership to the IRF, and provision to attend the IRF world congresses. The ARF represented Australian Rangers through providing forums that enable international communication and rangers to discuss topics of interest and exchange ideas.

The Council of Australian Ranger Associations (CARA) comprises representation from each state and territory associations in Australia which are themselves directly affiliated with the IRF. CARA is a professional body that represents and supports Rangers and other professional officers involved in the conservation and management of our natural and cultural resources. CARA represents not just only rangers, but all people that work within and supportive roles of staff of government and private conservation organisations.

== Operations ==
Membership to the individual state or territory association automatically entitles members to CARA and the IRF. Members of each state territory association have the opportunity to attend the IRF World congress, CARA annual general meetings, and input to the operations of CARA and the IRF.

Each state/territory association undertake the facilitation of CARA on an annual rotation basis. Representatives from each member state/territory association meet annual to discuss the operations of CARA and to maintain communication between each association

CARA is working with NGO’s and state conservation agencies to improve the profession within Australia. This includes:

- Implementing a National Survey, to gauge and develop support for the state and territory associations,
- Improving and implementing exchange and placement programs, and
- A National Rangers Congress.

== Affiliated organisations ==
- The Western Australian Park Rangers Association
- The Northern Territory National Parks Rangers Association
- The Protected Area Workers Association of NSW and ACT
- The Queensland Ranger Association
- The Tasmanian Rangers Association
- The South Australian Ranger Association
- The Association of Rangers and Conservationists Victoria
