= Canadian Council of Directors of Apprenticeship =

The Canadian Council of Directors of Apprenticeship is a partnership between Canada's federal, provincial and territorial governments. It supports the development of skilled trades in Canada and manages the Interprovincial Standards Red Seal Program.

It works to harmonize apprenticeship standards across different jurisdictions. The council itself has no powers, but the representatives may hold regulatory powers through specific provincial/territorial legislation.

== Composition ==
The Council has 15 members: One official from each provincial or territorial jurisdiction, who is responsible for the apprenticeship programs in each area, and two representatives from the Federal government: one from the Department of Employment, and one from Social Development Canada.

== Awards ==
It runs 3 different awards programs.

The Darryl Cruickshank Memorial Award is awarded every 2 years on even numbered years to someone in industry who "demonstrated inspirational leadership in the promotion and development of apprenticeship training for aspiring skilled tradespersons"

The Red Seal Award of Excellence is awarded every 2 years on odd numbered years to someone in who is "providing outstanding achievement in the development and promotion of apprenticeship training in Canada.

The CCDA Award for Excellence in Apprenticeship Education "award honours apprenticeship educators and training instructors who deliver innovative and top quality instructional programming to apprentices in Red Seal Trades." and is awarded every 2 years on odd years.
