= Scottish Enterprise =

Government agency in Glasgow City, Scotland

- Scottish Gaelic: Iomairt na h-Alba
- Scottish Enterprise logo

Agency overview
- Formed: 1 April 1991; 35 years ago
- Type: Executive non-departmental public body
- Jurisdiction: Scotland
- Headquarters: Atrium Court, Glasgow, G2 6HQ
- Agency executives: Professor Sir Jim McDonald, Chairman; Adrian Gillespie, Chief Executive
- Parent department: Scottish Government
- Key document: Enterprise and New Towns (Scotland) Act 1990
- Website: www.scottish-enterprise.com

Scottish Enterprise (Scottish Gaelic: Iomairt na h-Alba) is a non-departmental public body of the Scottish Government which encourages economic development, enterprise, innovation, international and investment in business. The body covers the eastern and central parts of Scotland whilst similar bodies, Highlands and Islands Enterprise and South of Scotland Enterprise, operate in north-western and southern Scotland, respectively.

== History ==
The body is a successor in part to the wide-ranging Scottish Development Agency which was established in 1975. The first Chairman of the SDA was Sir William Gray former Lord Provost of Glasgow. and the first Chief Executive was Dr, later Sir Lewis Robertson. The first year of its operation was 1977/78 with its functions described here in its first Annual Report 1978.

Scottish Enterprise was created on 1 April 1991 under the Enterprise and New Towns (Scotland) Act 1990. That act dissolved the Scottish Development Agency (SDA), created in 1975 and the Highlands and Islands Development Board forming Scottish Enterprise alongside Highlands and Islands Enterprise.

Scottish Enterprise was created with a structure of Local Enterprise Companies (LECs). Initially these were Limited Companies with boards led by local businesspeople, but from 2000 they became wholly owned subsidiaries of Scottish Enterprise and were subsequently wound up.

International trade and investment arm Scottish Development International was established in 2001 by merging the export promotion agency, Scottish Trade International (STI; 1991–2001) and the foreign direct investment and inward investment agency, Locate in Scotland (LiS; 1981–2001). It is jointly operated by Scottish Enterprise, Highlands and Islands Enterprise and South of Scotland Enterprise.

On 1 April 2008, the skills function of Scottish Enterprise moved out of the organisation to the newly formed Skills Development Scotland.

Lena Wilson became the Chief Executive in 2009. She had previously led Scottish Development International.

Lena Wilson left Scottish Enterprise in October 2017 after she was awarded a CBE for her contribution to Scotland in 2015. Wilson had also lead the government's "Scottish Oil & Gas jobs taskforce" whose task was completed in 2017. She had received criticism from the Scottish Parliament over taking a paid, non-executive directorship with the multinational product testing and certification company Intertek. Wilson had been paid £214,000 a year and she was replaced by Steve Dunlop, Chief Executive of Scottish Canals, who was offered £168,000. Steve Dunlop was still one of the top paid civil servants in Scotland. Dunlop resigned in 2020 and Linda Hanna became the interim CEO in the same month, with Adrian Gillespie taking over as CEO in June 2021.

== Structure ==
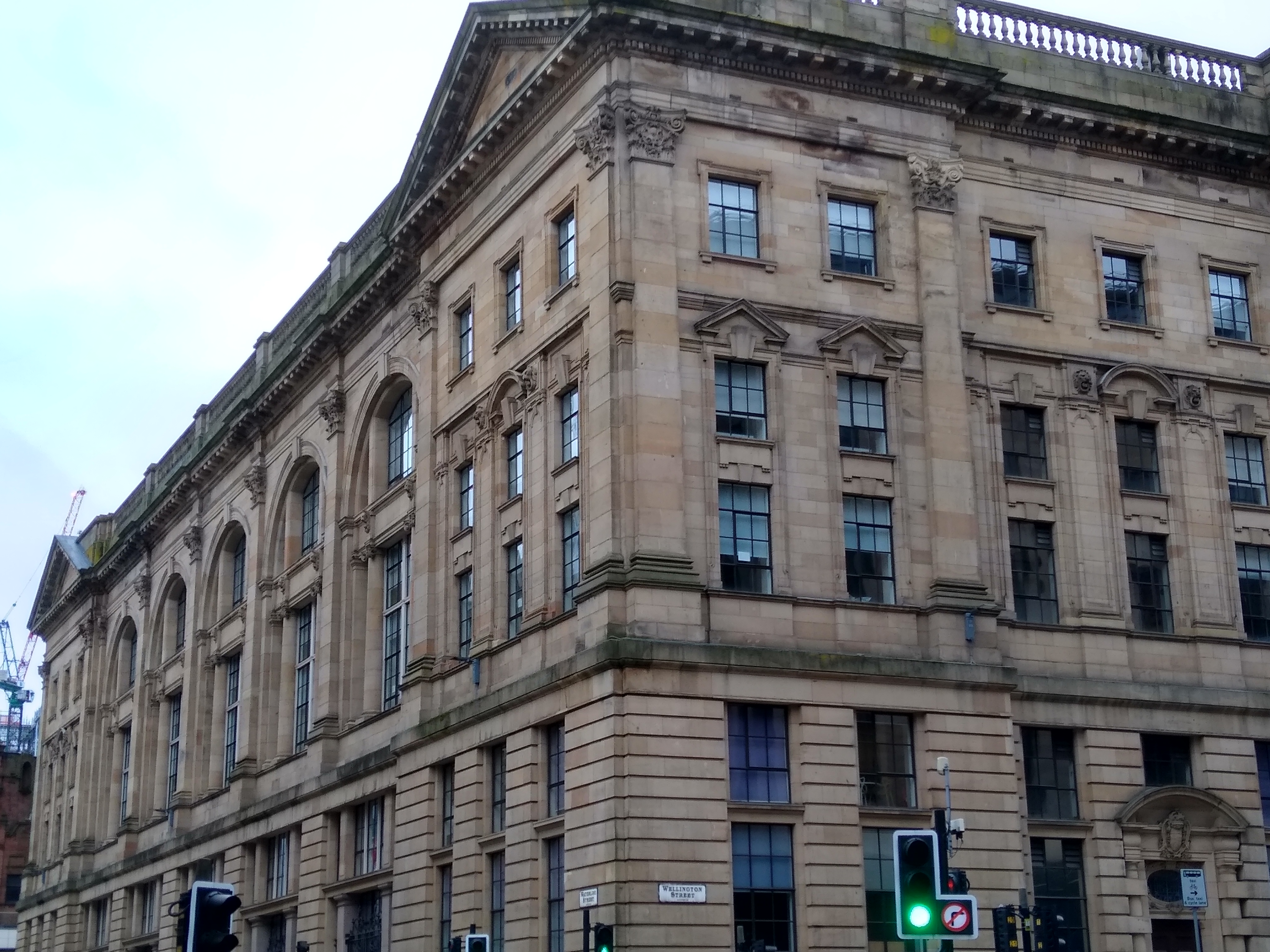
Atrium Court in Glasgow, current headquarters of Scottish Enterprise

Scottish Enterprise has around 1,100 staff based in ten offices across the UK, and offices in a further 20 overseas countries.

Organisational structure consists of a board headed by chairman, Willie Mackie to oversee fulfilment of the objectives established by the Scottish Government and an executive leadership team responsible for the day-to-day running of the organisation. The leadership team consists of:

- Adrian Gillespie - Chief Executive Officer
- Jane Martin, Managing Director of Innovation and Investment
- Gill McNeill, Chief People Officer of Digital, People and Communications
- Rhona Allison, Managing Director, Productivity and Business Growth
- Kerry Sharp, Chief Finance and Investment Officer
- Reuben Aitken, Managing Director, Energy Transition and International Operations

== Finances ==
Scottish Enterprise is a non-departmental public body of the Scottish Government, although it also raises part of its budget from other sources such as property rental and disposal of assets. The Scottish Government's draft spending plans for 2018/2019 allocated £256 million to Scottish Enterprise and Scottish Development International.

== Partners ==
Scottish Enterprise works with a range of other local, national and international strategic partners, from industry and the public sector to help deliver its wider range of services and sector-specific support across international trade, innovation, investment and growth.

These include:

- Scottish National Investment Bank (since 2020)
- Skills Development Scotland
- VisitScotland
- Business Gateway
- Scottish Funding Council
- Department for International Trade

Scottish Enterprise's international interests are supported by Scottish Development International, the international arm of Scotland's enterprise agencies.
