= Apprenticeship Levy =

Employment levy in the UK

The Apprenticeship Levy is a UK tax on employers which is used to fund apprenticeship training.

Introduced at the start of the 2017/18 tax year, it is payable by all employers with an annual pay bill of more than £3 million, at a rate of 0.5% of their total pay bill. It is collected through the Pay as you Earn process alongside other employment taxes.

== History ==
The Apprenticeship Levy was announced by Chancellor of the Exchequer George Osborne in the July 2015 budget which was held following that year's General Election. It was subsequently incorporated into law by Part 6 of the Finance Act 2016. and came into effect at the start of the 2017/18 UK tax year on 6 April 2017. It was projected to raise £2.675 billion in its first year of operation.

== Operation ==
The Apprenticeship Levy is paid by employers with annual pay bills in excess of £3 million. In this context, the pay bill is defined as the earnings liable to class 1 secondary National Insurance contributions. The levy is payable at 0.5% of the total pay bill (i.e. not just the element over £3 million) minus an annual "levy allowance" of £15,000, although the total amount payable equates to exactly 0.5% of the element over £3 million.

The levy due by an employer is paid to HMRC through the Pay-as-you-earn (PAYE) process alongside payment of Income Tax, National Insurance contributions and money deducted from employees' wages in order to repay Student Loans.

There are separate arrangements for the use of the money collected through the levy in each of England, Scotland, Wales and Northern Ireland, since apprenticeships are a devolved policy.

=== Use of funding in England ===
In England, the use of the levy for funding apprenticeships is the responsibility of the Department for Education, delivered through the Education and Skills Funding Agency.

The Levy paid by each employer is held in a 'digital fund' which the employer can use to pay for apprenticeship training. A 10% government contribution is added to each monthly payment. Funds in the digital fund remain available for 24 months from the date of payment. Any amount that remains unspent after that period will expire and will be reclaimed by HMRC, including the 10% contribution.

Payment from the digital fund is made directly to training providers on a monthly basis, for as long as the apprentice remains on the scheme (i.e., until the apprenticeship is completed or the apprentice leaves). Any apprenticeship that is terminated less than 42 days after the start of the apprenticeship will not qualify for any payment.

Initially, Levy-paying firms could only share 10% of their levy with other businesses. When this provision was introduced, a firm could also only nominate one other company to receive its levy fund, but from July 2018 this was extended to as many firms as the levy-payer wished. On 1 October, Philip Hammond MP, Chancellor of the Exchequer, announced that from April 2019 firms would be able to share up to 25% of their levy with other businesses in their supply chain, a move which was welcomed by businesses.
