= Scottish Development International =

Agency overview
- Formed: 2001; 25 years ago
- Preceding agencies: Locate in Scotland; Scottish Trade International
- Jurisdiction: Scotland
- Parent department: Scottish Enterprise; Highlands and Islands Enterprise
- Website: https://www.sdi.co.uk/

Scottish Development International (SDI) is the international arm of the Scottish Government and Scotland's enterprise agencies, Scottish Enterprise, Highlands and Islands Enterprise and South of Scotland Enterprise. The agency supports international investors in Scotland to help set up and grow in Scotland as a gateway to wider European and global markets.

== History ==
Scottish Development International was established in 2001 by merging the export promotion agency, Scottish Trade International (STI; 1991–2001) and the foreign direct investment and inward investment agency, Locate in Scotland (LiS; 1981–2001).

The agency currently has over 40 offices in around 20 countries across the globe.

The agency claimed its actions led to the creation of 7,839 jobs in Scotland in 2016/17.

== In North America ==
SDI's North American offices in the United States are in San Jose (California), Chicago (Illinois), Cambridge (Massachusetts), and Houston (Texas). Canadian offices are in Toronto (Ontario) and Calgary (Alberta). In the US, SDI promotes Scottish businesses and products at Tartan Day/Week events, and at American trade events such as the golf-oriented PGA Merchandise Show in Orlando, Florida, and the Atlanta International Gift and Home Furnishings Market. According to SDI, the US is Scotland's top destination for exports, which as of 2019 amounted to £6 billion, 17% of Scotland's total international trade.
