= Scottish Countryside Rangers Association =

The Scottish Countryside Rangers' Association (SCRA) is the professional association supporting rangers and other countryside professionals in Scotland. Formed in 1974, the association has a strong tradition of supporting its members through the provision of advice, training and the facilitation of networking opportunities.

Over recent years, efforts of the association have included organising the International Ranger Federation's 2006 World Ranger Congress in Stirling (in partnership with the Countryside Management Association of England and Wales), producing the Ranger Standards Manual, and starting to implement a programme of continuing professional development for rangers working in Scotland.

Over 300 rangers work in Scotland, employed by local government, by public bodies such as Forestry Commission Scotland and Historic Scotland, and by non-governmental organisations such as the Scottish Wildlife Trust.
