= Franklin Sixth Form College =

Sixth form school in Grimsby, England

Location
- Chelmsford Avenue; Grimsby, North East Lincolnshire, DN34 5BY; England; 53°33′16″N 0°06′19″W

Information
- Type: Sixth form
- Motto: To provide the best possible life chances for our community
- Established: 1990
- Founder: Humberside County Council
- Local authority: North East Lincolnshire
- Department for Education URN: 130586 Tables
- Ofsted: Reports
- Corporation chair: Mike Fox
- Principal: Wendy Ellis
- Staff: 179 total (2011); 107 teaching 72 non-teaching
- Gender: Mixed
- Age: 16 to 19
- Enrolment: 2,740 total (2010–11); 1,705 aged 16–18; 1,034 aged 19+
- Website: http://www.franklin.ac.uk

Franklin Sixth Form College is a sixth form college on Chelmsford Avenue in Grimsby, North East Lincolnshire, England, serving more than 2,700 students, including adult learners.

== Location ==
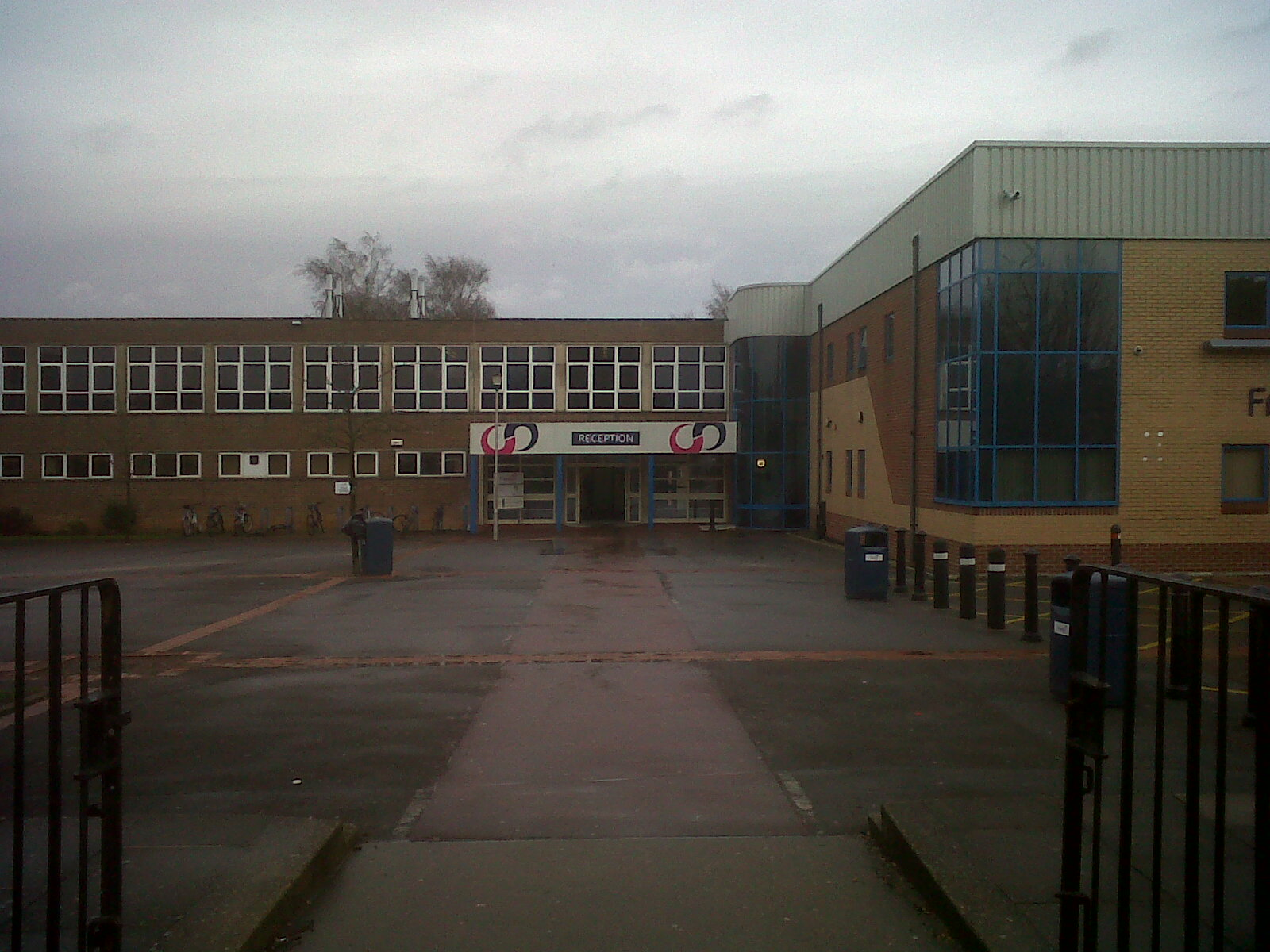
The main entrance to the college before renovations added new office space, on Chelmsford Avenue

One of 92 sixth form colleges in England, Franklin College is situated west of Grimsby town centre, in the Grange area of the town. It is located on Chelmsford Avenue, which can be accessed from Laceby Road (A46). The Grimsby Institute's East Coast School of Art, and the Ormiston Maritime Academy (previously known as Hereford Technology School), are located down the adjacent Westward Ho.

== Admissions ==
While Franklin College is primarily for students aged 16–19 who want to study for A levels, mature students are also welcome to enrol, and evening classes are available, some based throughout Grimsby and Cleethorpes. It currently serves in excess of 1,700 full-time students aged 16–18 from the whole of North East Lincolnshire and surrounding areas, in addition to more than a thousand adult learners aged 19 or over.

== History ==
=== Establishment ===
The Conservatives councillors on the council wanted to call it the Grimsby Sixth Form College. Councillors voted by 8–2 to call it the Franklin Sixth Form College on Tuesday 13 February 1990, by Labour councillors after the Labour councillor Jack Franklin, who died in 1980; his wife died in 1988. It cost £2.4m and tool 18 months, being built by Top Con Limited, to rebuild the site into a college.

On the local council, not all of the councillors agreed on the state of Grimsby's education. The Conservative group on the education committee had frequently referred to low standards and inadequate exam results. But the Labour group, led by committee chairman Max Bird, had said that establishment of the college had led to more staying on at 17, and more A levels were being taken. But the previous sixth forms at local schools had been failing, leading to the sixth forms being closed in 1990, apart from Lindsey School and the Toll Bar School.

=== Opening ===
The college was founded in September 1990 by Humberside County Council, Franklin College was named after two councillors, Jack and Florence Franklin, who had devoted much time to the area. The site opened on Monday 10 September 1990, with 620 from Barton to Market Rasen.

Nearby city Kingston upon Hull had gained two sixth form colleges the year before. The first principal was Peter Newcome, who retired in late 2009 and was replaced by principal Trevor Wray. The current principal is now Peter Kennedy. The college site had at one time been occupied by Chelmsford Secondary Modern School before its closure.

Initially planned to be a small sixth form with about 450 students due to low further education uptake in the area, the college has exceeded that number and currently serves more than 1,700 full-time students aged 16–18.

It was initially run by Humberside Education Committee until 1993, then administered by the FEFC. Following the FEFC's abolition in 2001, the college was run by the newly formed Yorkshire LSC, which was itself replaced by the YPLA in April 2010. The YPLA was abolished in 2012 and replaced with the Education Funding Agency and the Skills Funding Agency. Both the EFA and SFA were abolished in March 2017 and their responsibilities transferred to the Education and Skills Funding Agency. Humberside was abolished in 1996, and the college now resides within the region of North East Lincolnshire LEA, but is not part of or controlled by the authority.

It initially offered Spanish, Russian French and German at A level.

== Academic record ==
The report published by Ofsted following an inspection of the college in 2008 describes school success rate as "consistently at or above the national average at all levels for all ages", and rated the college as Grade 2 (good) in all six criteria (effectiveness of provision, capacity to improve, achievement and standards, quality of provision, leadership and management, and equality of opportunity).

In 2009 the college came first in North East Lincolnshire for points per student.

In 2011, 100% of students left the college with at least two A levels or equivalent qualifications, and 95% achieved the equivalent of three A level passes. 41.2% of A level entries in 2010 earned A*–B grades. This breaks down as 24.1% B grades, 12.7% A grades, and 4.4% A* grades. The average UCAS Tariff point score per student upon graduation was 349.75. For comparison, the same year 8.1% of all A level entries were awarded an A* grade, 18.9% received an A, and 25.2% received a B. This places Franklin College below the national average.

Following an Ofsted inspection in 2018, the college was awarded a 'Good' rating.

== Facilities ==
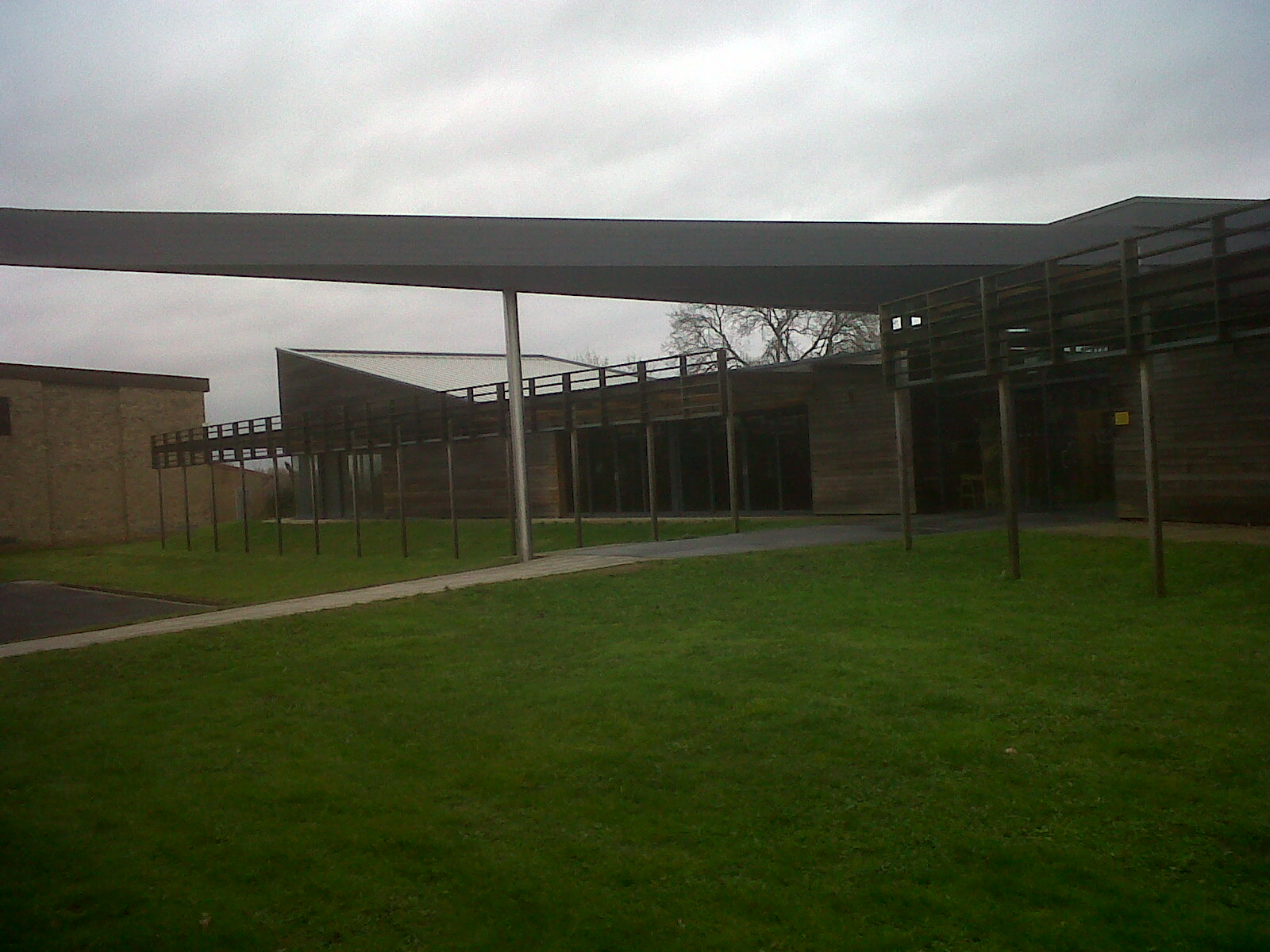
The £1 million art block that opened in 2007

In 2007, the college opened a new £1 million art block, equipped for subjects such as art and photography.

The site had a Youth Enterprise company. Radio Franklin College opened in March 1992.

Franklin College also possesses a library and study area that provides a wide selection of fiction and non-fiction books and DVDs. Previously called the Learning Resource Centre (LRC), this was renovated and renamed the Learning Centre in late 2011.

Construction of a new £1 million extension, consisting of classrooms for IT and health on the college site, began in November 2011.

In 2023, the college opened a new learning centre called The Bridge following a £1.7 million investment.

== Sport ==
In 1991, it formed a rugby union team. The other local sixth form colleges had rugby union teams.

== Notable alumni ==
- Keeley Donovan – BBC weather forecaster who studied media at Franklin
- Matt Kennard (actor)
- Melanie Onn, Labour MP for Great Grimsby since 2015
- Matthew Stiff – opera singer and former member of G4
