= Common Application Process =

English school and college application scheme

The Common Application Process (CAP) is a new England-wide scheme for course applications to schools and colleges after the ages of 14 and 16, via the internet.

== English state schools and colleges ==
It is used, and will be used, by schools for admission to sixth forms or GCSE courses. Each Connexions area (usually one local education authority or an education partnership of two nearby LEAs) may have a separate Common Application Process (CAP) website. This standardises the application, and allows students to know the whole complement of choices available - not just those in their local town, or local school or college.

The name Common Application Process, using websites for each Connexions area (LEA), is applying the UCAS method (of applying for university courses) to school admissions - to widen knowledge of the scope of courses available. It makes it a more up-front and transparent method, less informal, of applying to further education and GCSE courses. It also saves time and duplication, by not re-inventing the wheel each time a school has to design an application system - it has been combined into one for each Connexions area. It has only been possible since improved access to the internet has made it viable.

It is aimed specifically at people at school or college ages 14 to 19 and is linked to the local Connexions office (Connexions Centre) for that area. It is the infrastructure and interface for applications to education after 14, allowing easy access to the Area Wide Prospectus (AWP) for that Connexions area. It is a joined-up service of education application - Connexions itself is designed similarly as a joined-up service.

Education of the age bracket from 14-19 was partly maintained by Learning and Skills Councils (LSCs) before replaced by Young People's Learning Agency (YPLA). The provision of 14-19 education has now been placed much more in the hands of local education authorities. Education at the 14-19 level is planned by Area Strategy Groups (ASGs) within each Connexions area, which look after the relevant district council areas.

Where the term Common Application Process is used in the context of English schools, it denotes an unambiguous and uniform method of application across the Connexions area. It is the responsibility of the relevant area (LEA or similar) to provide a CAP for all the courses available after 14.

However although it is a common application, access to more demanding academic courses after 16 will depend on exam success at 16, and therefore not available to all.

=== Project history ===
At the moment the CAP is being trialled in some LEAs (or partnerships). The fundamental intention of the vast government IT project is to attract more people to stay on for training after 16, if only by preventing ignorance.

== See also ==
- Working Group for 14–19 Reform
- National Apprenticeship Service
- Common Application - American version of UCAS
- Common application procedure - individual institutions or groups of institutions may use this name for a standard procedure for applications
