= Career Development Institute =

For the youngsters by the Government

The Career Development Institute is the British professional association for career development.

== History ==
It was founded in 1922. Previous to 1948, it was the Association of Juvenile Employment Officers, who worked in a Juvenile Employment Bureau. It was known as the National Association of Youth Employment Officers until April 1961, when it became the Institute of Youth Employment Officers. It was the Institute of Careers Officers from the late 1960s until October 1991, becoming the Institute of Career Guidance from 22 October 1991, and the Institute of Career Guidance from 1 November 2000.

In the 1960s, its staff were widely referred to as youth employment officers; there were around 1,500 of these by 1965.

In the 1960s, it worked with the government Youth Employment Service. In 1962, a report it had commissioned found that apprenticeships widely varied, and some apprenticeship schemes were not really apprenticeships. In the 1960s, it worked with the Association of Chief Education Officers Percy Walton, the Secretary, took part in the BBC2 ten-part series Just the Job on Monday 13 January 1969, repeated on BBC1 in July 1969.

In 1971 there were 2,000 careers officers in the UK, for 7,000 secondary schools. In January 1972, the President, Katherine Hall, spoke at a three-day conference of the British Psychological Society, at the University of Warwick, where also Zander Wedderburn of Heriot-Watt University spoke about the effects of shift work, and Hywel Murrell of the University of Wales Institute of Science and Technology (UWIST) spoke; he had invented the term ergonomics in 1949, and founded the organisation which is now The Chartered Institute of Ergonomics and Human Factors. The Employment and Training Act 1973 made it a legal requirement for local authorities to provide careers guidance; this was revoked by the Trade Union Reform and Employment Rights Act 1993.

Cheshire was the first county to offer careers guidance via computer from September 1973 to June 1974. It was run with the IBM UK Scientific Centre, at two schools, Ellesmere Port Grammar School and the Winsford Verdin Comprehensive School.

In November 1981 the Conservative government proposed the removal of 16 of Britain's 23 industrial training boards. The YTS scheme was introduced in September 1983. In May 1984 it launched the week-long Jobsearch '84, then Jobsearch '85 the next year, and in May 1986, June 1987, and April 1988, in conjunction with BBC Radio 1, which hosted phone-ins; by May 1989 it became Careers Service Week. The Technical and Vocational Education Initiative (TVEI) was launched in the late 1980s.

In the early 1990s it published Stepping into Europe, a guide to working in Europe, and Europps, for the EC. Youth unemployment statistics have been collated since 1992. The Conservative government privatised the Careers Service in 1994, but it was well-funded, and was a halcyon era for careers guidance in the UK, although was before the plentiful careers information later being available over the internet. When the Labour government entered, it heavily prioritised the 16–19 age range, and largely viewed capable well-qualified people, over that age range as unimportant, or 'not an urgent priority'. The Labour government formed organisations, such as the Social Exclusion Unit; the government saw people needing career guidance, often as possible victims of society. Connexions, established by the Learning and Skills Act 2000, was there to help people on the margins of society, and was less about offering professional guidance, which the previous Careers Service had done; if you required professional guidance, you were probably not on the margins of society. Connexions was, essentially, a demeaning or trivial view of careers guidance; only people with learning difficulties over the age of 19 could be helped, so it would offer nothing whatsoever to university graduates looking for work. The Connexions Card launched in June 2002, apparently for 16–19 year olds, barely had any credible effect, and was mostly taken up by more-affluent opportunist teenagers, probably on the make, instead. Connexions was not really for people entering the well-heeled professions; it was largely for people who would struggle to get five good GCSEs.

== Structure ==
The organisation is today headquartered in the West Midlands. It had 16 regional branches in the 1990s.

== Function ==
It produced a journal called Youth Employment, in the 1960s.

=== Annual conference ===
- October 1932, Birmingham, discussed vocational psychology
- May 1950, Margate Winter Gardens, the Mayor of Margate, who was the Chairman of Kent Education Committee, gave an address, where he said that it was a melancholic fact that only one in three youth wanted a job in industry, after leaving school, and that the rest sought the safe, soft jobs; he said that people should love their jobs, or they were in for penal servitude, for the rest of their life; the Labour MP for Faversham from 1945 to 1964 Percy Wells, a former TGWU official, gave a talk on trade unions and apprenticeships; he said that bad ventilation had done harm to youths in factories
- May 1951 Saltburn Spa, at Saltburn-by-the-Sea, around two hundred delegates were given a talk by William Piercy, 1st Baron Piercy, Chairman of the National Youth Employment Council, and another speaker said that one 20-minute talk from a youth employment officer, did not provide enough guidance; Saltburn and Marske-by-the-Sea Urban District council spent £60 on a civic reception for the event, which a councillor said 'we are £60 out of pocket' to help 'a small percentage of the population', but another councillor thought that it was £60 worth of good advertising
- May 1952 Eastbourne Winter Gardens, the president, a youth employment officer from Cardiff, took exception with a recent speech of Sir Ronald Gould (trade unionist), general secretary of the NUT and son of former Labour MP Frederick Gould, who said that boys and girls going into the world of work at age 15 was 'a calamity'; the president also said the Minister of Education had not shown much interest in vocational guidance; a representative from the Headmasters Association (now the Association of School and College Leaders) spoke to around 250 delegates, and the Education Act 1944 was discussed, with the raising of the school age to 15, and the recent introduction of the GCE; there was an increasing view that grammar school education was incomplete, for those that left at 16; a talk was given by Dr Maurice Thomas, headteacher of Tottenham County School, who had written the 1945 book Young People in Industry, 1750–1945, published by Thomas Nelson (publisher)
- May 1953, Harrogate, a Bradford delegate said that youths were being transported 30 to 40 miles from Doncaster mining areas, to work in Bradford spinning mills, and that travelling-to-work time should be taken into account, in the 44 hour legal maximum work time for youths
- May 1954, Hastings White Rock Pavilion (White Rock Theatre since 1985), Katherine Hughes, of Lambeth, wanted girls to be offered apprenticeships, in the way that boys were; William Cartledge of Wolverhampton wanted the term 'apprentice' to be more defined, to safeguard youths being 'taken in by blind-alley jobs', as some employers 'dressed up job titles'
- May 1955, Buxton
- May 1956 Southsea Pier, attended by Richard Law, 1st Baron Coleraine, Chairman of the National Youth Employment Council, and University of Birmingham sociology lecturer A. H. Halsey although to be later a sociology consultant for introduction of comprehensive education in the mid-1960s, A.H. Halsey said that working class children in grammar schools were gaining a need to do better than their parents, and that there was an increasing need of working-class parents to have a grammar school education for their children; the Association president said that high wages being offered for unskilled work at age 16 to 18, was not helpful in the long-term for children taking up skilled work, and that parents should perhaps take a longer view, and also that grammar-school-educated children should not choose work below the limit of their capacity, again to perhaps take the longer view; the Employment and Training Act 1948, which had established the Youth Employment Service, also laid down guidelines for school-leaving reports, which some delegates believed only discussed school results, and not enough background information; delegates also thought that the Youth Employment Service could be more involved at an earlier age, and to encourage more work experience schemes at school; HMS Starling (U66) and HMS Vigo (D31), of the Portsmouth Squadron, took around 100 delegates around Portsmouth Harbour; the Association president, from Vicars Cross in Chester, described the Education Act 1944, as the 'greatest piece of social legislation of all time', and that grammar schools should be training leaders, for commerce and industry, as well as the professions and universities; he said that academically inclined females should not be deterred from choosing mathematical courses, by snobbery, or social precedent; technical schools should also offer a broad education, not just to offer training for one trade only; he warned that a first-class education was no good, without a good moral upbringing, as well
- May 1958, Brighton, there was discussion about whether Youth Employment Services received enough relative funding, which the Association of Education Committees did not think was enough
- May 1959, Margate Winter Gardens, opened by Conservative MP Richard Wood, Baron Holderness, son of Edward Wood, 1st Earl of Halifax, the conference was joint-hosted with the International Vocational Guidance Association; delegates visited HMS Paladin (G69), which was moored
- May 1960, Albert Halls, Stirling, the first time that the conference was held in Scotland; school-leavers on apprenticeships had risen from 109,114 in 1956 to 119,332 in 1959, but the proportions had dropped from 18% to 15.4%
- April 1961, University of Birmingham, attended by John Hare, 1st Viscount Blakenham, the Minister of Labour (now called Secretary of State for Employment), also visited by Conservative MP Robert Carr (later Home Secretary from 1972 to 1974), who had written a report on industrial training, Labour MP Reg Prentice (later Education Secretary from 1974 to 1975), Sir William Alexander of the Association of Education Committees, and an economic forecast lecture was given by Sir Charles Frederick Carter, Stanley Jevons Professor of Political Economy at the University of Manchester
- May 1962, Dorset
- April 1963, Blackpool, attended by the Minister of Education
- September 1965, London
- October 1966, Worcestershire
- September 1970, Queen's University Belfast, attended by Frank Pakenham, 7th Earl of Longford, Chairman of the NYEC
- September 1971, Swansea, proposals were to lower the minimum age of 18 for process and shift work
- September 1973, Nottingham, attended by Maurice Macmillan, the Secretary of State for Employment
- September 1975 Lancaster University
- September 1976, Oban, Scotland
- September 1977, Cambridge
- September 1978, Exeter
- October 1983, Eastbourne
- September 1986, Cardiff, attended by Employment Secretary David Young, Baron Young of Graffham
- September 1987, University of Birmingham, where Sir John Banham, director general of the CBI, spoke, and Bill Morris, Baron Morris of Handsworth of the TGWU
- September 1992, Lancaster University, addressed by Bishop of Liverpool David Sheppard
- September 1994, University of Reading, the National Careers Guidance Conference, opened by Ann Widdecombe, with Sue Slipman, and a speaker from the National Institute for Careers Education and Counselling
- September 1995, University of Liverpool, the speakers were the University of Liverpool professor of applied economics Patrick Minford, Labour MP Angela Eagle, and a discussion was hosted by Valerie Singleton
- September 1996, Edinburgh, Labour MP Stephen Byers outlined that a Labour government would give interest-free loans to the long-term unemployed
- September 1997, University of Warwick
- November 2010, Belfast, where the government launched the all-age National Careers Service, to replace the Connexions service from April 2012, with Sir John Hayes; Connexions had been costing about £200m a year; the Aimhigher widening-participation service would be withdrawn too.
- November 2015, Mercure Holland House Hotel and Spa, Cardiff
- June 2022, University of Derby
- December 2023, Birmingham
- November 2024, The Studio, Birmingham
- November 2025, The Studio, Birmingham

=== Awards ===
Its annual awards started in 1997.

- November 1999, National Careers Awards at the University of Warwick

== See also ==
- Association of Colleges, represents sixth form colleges
- Job Ideas and Information Generator Computer Assisted Learning, known as JIIG-CAL, developed by psychologist Jim Closs at the University of Edinburgh, in the early 1980s
- National Institute of Industrial Psychology, also offered advice
- Vocational Guidance Association, founded in 1958 by Cedric Pyle
