= National Employer Service =

The National Employer Service (NES) was a service of the Learning and Skills Council which became the Skills Funding Agency. Its purpose was to offer specialist advice and funding for further education to national, multi-site employers with more than 5000 employees.

The service worked with 150 companies including BT Group, Sainsbury's, Tesco and McDonald's.

First established in 2003 as the National Contracting Service, its role evolved from centrally delivering government funding towards working in partnership with large employers, providing specialist advice on the development of large scale work-based training programmes.

This co-investment approach to frontline training involved channeling public investment to areas where it delivered the greatest value for money.

In a speech on the subject, the then Conservative party leader David Cameron incorrectly identified the National Employer Service as a Quango in its own right.

The National Employer Service was based at the Skills Funding Agency's national office in Cheylesmore House, Cheylesmore, Coventry and was one of a number of specialist services housed within the wider agency.

In October 2010, the National Employer Service was incorporated into the National Apprenticeship Service.

== See also ==
- Learning and Skills Council
- Skills Funding Agency
- Higher Education Funding Council for England
- Lifelong learning
- Qualifications and Curriculum Authority
- Vocational education
