= Youth Employment Service =

Historic UK government agency

The Youth Employment Service was a British government agency from the 1950s to the 1970s, aimed at school-leavers (teenagers).

== History ==
From the late 1910s, many Local Education Authorities in England and Wales had set up Youth Employment Services, started by the Education (Choice of Employment) Act 1910, for up to the age of 17. Scotland had not been allowed to do this. The Education Act 1918 allowed LEAs to guidance up to the age of 18.

The Unemployment Insurance Act 1923 allowed LEAs to cover juveniles in an unemployment insurance scheme. In 1927 the Ministry of Labour established the National Advisory Council for Juvenile Employment.

The Employment and Training Act 1948 was passed by the Labour government of 1945-51, and section 10 of this act established and employment advisory service for all young people under 18 who attended school. By January 1949, 43 county councils and 73 county boroughs in England and Wales, and 3 town councils and 10 county councils in Scotland had submitted plans for their youth employment services.

Each individual youth employment bureau would have a youth employment committee, with local teachers, employers, employees, and representatives of the local council. London County Council would have 17 YES offices, from September 1949, costing £70,400 per year.

Around 100 public schools had formed the Public Schools Appointments Bureau, formed in 1950, to provide the same function as the Youth Employment Service.

From 1948 until 1960 there was also National Service, for 18 yr olds. Due to fluctuations in the birth rate, the numbers of 18 year olds would again reach the numbers in 1938 by 1960.

When a person left school at 18, they would fill in a vocational guidance record card. From 1953, this record card no longer had the individual views of each youth employment officer, as it was not thought to be definitive information, and was largely unsubstantiated opinion.

From 1951 to 1952 vacancies for under-18s dropped from around 18,000 to around 11,000. Under-18 unemployment claimants rose from around 1,900 to around 6,400, in 1952.

In the early 1950s a large proportion of girls wanted to be air hostesses, as it was seen as a highly glamorous industry. By 1954 the service was costing £1.7m a year.

The late 1950s was a halcyon unsurpassed era for the apprenticeship system. In the 1950s and 1960s, the service had great popular support. In May 1958, people could find work in different areas, through the service. Previously, the service could only largely assist people who live locally to the employer.

Northern Ireland set up a service from the 1960s. From 1961 a youth employment officer, Miss Catherine Avent, sat on one of the Central Advisory Councils for Education. The service worked with Industrial Training Councils on apprenticeships. The Central Youth Employment Executive published the 'Choice of Career' series of books. The early 1960s saw a huge spike in school leavers, known as 'the bulge'.

The Careers Research and Advisory Centre was set up on St Andrew's Street in Cambridge in 1964. In 1965 the Conservative Party planned to move the service to be the Careers Advisory Service.

In December 1965 the NYEC published a report 'The Future Development of the Youth Employment Service'. The report proposed that the maximum age, to offer advice, be raised from 18 to 21 by 1970. The report was discussed in parliament in late January 1966.

The Education and Science Select Committee published a report in October 1969, which recommended a wider age range of applicants for the service In the late 1960s under the Department of Employment and Productivity

Computers had arrived by 1972 to help people find suitable work.

=== Work experience ===
Work experience in the last year of school was gaining much popularity by 1965, where a fifth year would have one day a week in work. But the TUC were not too happy about such proposals. 15 year olds were restricted from working in factories, due to the Factories Act 1961. Sweden had a fully-developed system of secondary school work experience.

=== Replacement ===
It would be replaced from 1974 onwards by the Careers Service.

In December 1971, Robert Carr, the Secretary of State for Employment, brought in wide-ranging changes to the Department of Employment, that have largely stayed. It formed the Training Services Agency and the Employment Services Agency.

In the changes to local government in April 1974, the Youth Employment Service would largely be disbanded, with its 2,100 careers officers, and the new local authorities would look after their own careers services, in how each wanted to do so. This also covered people in further education and polytechnics.

The dissolution of the service came with the Employment and Training Act 1973, under Maurice Macmillan. But a subcommittee of the Expenditures Committee, under Labour MP Renée Short, wanted all local authorities to keep a youth employment service.

When the YES was subsumed into the Careers Service in April 1974, it lacked the strong, or natural and authentic, connection that the former organisation had with local schools.

== Purpose ==
The organisation (also known as the Y.E.S.), set up in district and regional centres, provided vocational guidance for people aged around 16-17, many often from grammar schools. Only the most academic would attend university from the age of 18 in the 1950s, and many of those at grammar school would not stay until the age of 18. The A-level had been introduced in 1951, and previous to this it had been the Higher School Certificate; in Scotland it has been the Higher exam. In 1945 24% of those at grammar school left before the age of 16; by 1949 this had lowered to 16%. In 1945, 15% of those at grammar school would stay until the age of 18; by 1949, this was over 20%. By 1955, around 34% of those at grammar school stayed on until 18.

In 1962, around 38% of boys found apprenticeships. The service was also involved with finding work for youths who were physically handicapped and educationally subnormal.

=== Aspirations of parents and teachers ===
There were marked differences between the aspirations of grammar school entrants to the world of work, and those from public school. Around 40% of public school parents worked in commerce and industry, being often high up in those companies, and entrants to work, from public school, often followed their parents likewise into these companies, which sometimes involved elements of nepotism. But grammar school parents often had a more modest employment situation, and were notably less 'well-connected'. Grammar school teachers were reported to have not favoured industry and commerce, but the professions instead, and grammar school entrants into work were more inclined to look at the professions, than industry or commerce.

== Staff ==
In 1949, county youth employment officers, employed by the county councils, were paid around £700 per year. Deputy county youth employment officers would also be paid this, if they were men, but would be paid up to £560, if they were women. Divisional youth employment officers were paid around £490, whether they were men or women.

Unpaid voluntary workers, of local councils, also frequently worked in the Youth Employment Service. A significant amount of work, in the service, was carried out by volunteers.

London County Council had around 2,400 voluntary workers in 1955, who worked in areas such as the school medical service. Voluntary workers were known for their work with 'problem families'.

Staff had to be 23 to become a youth employment officer. By 1966 this was often a minimum age of 25. There were 900 youth employment officers in 1956, which had increased to 1,560 by 1965. There was the Institute of Youth Employment Officers.

=== Training ===
Training was provided by the Youth Employment Service Training Board.

In 1951 the Piercy Committee recommended that youth employment officers needed much more substantive relevant training. Annual training courses were held at Lamorbey Park in Kent. These courses were taught by Prof Alec Rodger from 1949. This college eventually became the Kent College for the Careers Service, in Hextable, in north-west Kent, off the A20.

The Hextable site became the College of Guidance Studies, funded by HEFCE, and later part of Canterbury Christ Church University College, being closed in August 2000.

=== Former employees ===
- Philip Nash, set up the Norfolk service, in the early 1950s

== Structure ==
It was financed by the Ministry of Labour and local authorities.

The total cost in the early 1950s of the service per year was around £1.7m. In a study from 1950-3, it was found that around 1.48m school-leavers had been given advice, and from that 1.357m had directly found employment.

A Training Allowance Scheme had been introduced in 1947 for Youths when Training away from Home. Those working in the service were known as Youth Employment Officers; in later years, their function was largely taken over by careers advisory officers. The service was run by the Central Youth Employment Executive, composed of people from the Ministry of Labour, the Ministry of Education and the Scottish Education Department. In 1963 there were around 1,000 youth employment officers. Youth Employment Officers were trained at the Youth Employment Service Training Board.

The service had eight activities

- Contact with school - the service could request school reports for all children of the minimum (statutory) school leaving age.
- Knowledge of opportunities available - from a working knowledge of local industries
- Contact with potential school-leavers - to introduce children to the realities of going to work, and giving work-experience schemes
- Training - to discuss what courses would be suitable for the appropriate career that had been chosen
- Placing
- Review of progress - if the youngster was later unhappy in the job they had chosen
- Disabled children
- Unemployment insurance and supplementary allowances

== See also ==
- Career Development Institute, the former National Association of Youth Employment Officers, who worked at the service
- Central Advisory Council for Education
- National Youth Employment Council, set up by the act, and appointed by the Ministry of Labour three years at a time
- Youth Opportunities Programme, established by a Labour government in 1978
- Youth Training Scheme (YTS), established in 1983 by the Conservative government of Margaret Thatcher
- National Apprenticeship Service
