= Training and enterprise council =

Training and enterprise councils (TECs) were local bodies established in England and Wales in the early 1990s to administer publicly funded training programmes, replacing the former Manpower Services Commission. The first group of 19 TECs were launched in 1990. TECs managed various schemes including Youth Training (formerly known as the Youth Training Scheme) and the early modern apprenticeship. They also promoted training and business enterprise with local organisations. TECs operated as private limited companies and reported on their progress to their regional government office.

The TECs were abolished in April 2001 under the Learning and Skills Act 2000. In England, their functions, along with those of the Further Education Funding Council, were taken over by the Learning and Skills Council. In Wales, they were replaced by ELWa.

In the final stages there were around 82 (the reported numbers vary) each on average receiving £32–38 million a year. The TECs were largely unaccountable and the basis of operation varied greatly from area to area. For instance Kent TEC was a large-scale operation integrated into the Kent County Council while in Wigan the TEC was based in a lock-up garage.

== See also ==
- Career Development Institute
