= Newcross Healthcare =

English social and health care company

- Founded: 1996
- Headquarters: Totnes
- Number of locations: 63
- Services: healthcare, complex care
- Number of employees: 18,000+
- Website: www.newcrosshealthcare.com

Newcross Healthcare is a company based in Totnes which provides agency social and health care workers. It is among the five biggest employers in Devon.

It's one of the largest such companies in the UK. It has branches all over Great Britain.

Stephen Pattrick is the founder and chief executive. Michelle Gorringe is the co-founder, managing director and is also a registered nurse.

In November 2022 it organised a survey with YouGov which showed that 29% of care workers said they were no longer able live on the money they earned and 27% said they were likely to leave the sector in the next 12 months.

== Company history ==
- 1996: Newcross Healthcare was founded and first branch opened in Torquay, Devon
- 2002: Branches were opened in Bristol, Liverpool and Southampton
- 2004: Head office moves to Totnes
- 2006: First office in Scotland opened
- 2019: Newcross Healthcare appoints 7,000th employee and has a network of 63 local centres across the UK.

== Industry accreditation ==
Newcross Healthcare is rated by the Care Quality Commission for branches that are registered as a care provider for ‘complex care’ (care in the home). The majority of Newcross Healthcare locations have been rated “Good” or “Outstanding” by the Care Quality Commission.

The Care Quality Commission reported in July 2018 that the Bristol branch was not consistently keeping clients safe because of a lack of qualified staff. Despite this, the Bristol branch was rated “Good” for both the effectiveness and caring nature of its service.

Newcross is Carbon Neutral, offsetting carbon emissions through renewable energy projects across the world. A project based in Balikesir, Turkey involved the installation and operation of 10 2.5MW wind turbines that provides renewable energy to the local community without the need to burn fossil fuels. This project is estimated to reduce CO_{2} emissions by as much as 59,796 tonnes per year.

== Training and development ==
In 2018, Newcross Healthcare provided 200 in-house training courses to over 1,000 nurses and healthcare assistants each month.

Newcross Healthcare is an end-point assessment organisation for apprenticeships in the UK. The organisation is the first care provider to be approved by the Education and Skills Funding Agency (EFSA) as an EPA assessor for Lead Adult Care Worker and Adult Care Worker Standards.

Newcross Healthcare currently has 231 healthcare apprenticeships running nationwide and its average retention rate on health and social care apprenticeship courses is 89%, which is 17% higher than the national average.

== Digital innovation ==
In 2013, the organisation launched its Newcross Homecare Management App, a portable tool that allows clinical assessors to create, personalise and confirm care plans. The aim of this technology is to “save clinicians time, and to ensure that patients receive the care they require in the most effective way”. Led by clinical input from nurses, the app is designed to provide “an intuitive experience that allows the user to concentrate on listening to a client and provide the highest quality service possible”.

Newcross Healthcare's app, HealthForceGo, was created to aid carers with various admin tasks, including time sheets, payslips, a mileage calculator, and a calendar to see previous and upcoming shifts and availability listings.

Newcross Healthcare also uses FlexiPay, which gives carers the option to request an advance payment against completed shifts. They can be paid as early as one hour after the completion of a shift.

== Ownership ==
The company is owned by Beluga Rock Holdings Limited, registered in Gibraltar. It has about 7000 staff and made a profit of £21 million in 2017. Directors were paid £17 million in dividends.

== Awards ==
In 2000, the organisation was awarded the Investors in People Standard, reflecting “workplace trends and essential skills”, and was awarded Silver Status in 2017.

In 2007, Newcross was awarded the Fire Mark Award by Royal Sun Alliance for outstanding health and safety controls.

In 2015, CEO of Newcross Healthcare, Stephen Pattrick, was nominated for the UK Entrepreneur of the Year Award.

In 2018, Newcross Healthcare was named as one of the ‘Fastest Growing Firms in Devon and Cornwall”.

== Incidents ==
In December 2018 it hit the headlines when an investigation by The Guardian revealed that staff who were sick and cancelled shifts with less than 24 hours notice were not paid and had £50 docked from their wages. This was particularly an issue given that the people they care for are vulnerable to infection. They were not paid for travelling between clients. The company then announced that it would be phasing out the penalty by April 2019. Jon Ashworth demanded that it be removed immediately.

Newcross responded to the report, stating that the protocol was designed to ensure that there would be “no disruption in patient care” and that each cancellation was reviewed by a line manager so that fees were not automatically applied when someone is genuinely ill. The organisation claimed that in 90% of cases fees were not applied and that carers could appeal if they believed the fee had been incorrectly administered.
