= National College for Teaching and Leadership =

Agency overview
- Formed: 2013
- Dissolved: 2018
- Type: Executive agency
- Jurisdiction: England
- Parent department: Department for Education

The National College for Teaching and Leadership (NCTL) was an executive agency of the British Department for Education from 2013 to 2018. It inherited the responsibilities of the National College for School Leadership (NCSL). The NCTL aimed to improve academic standards by ensuring a well-qualified teaching workforce and supporting schools.

The NCTL also regulated the teaching profession by:

- Prohibiting teachers from working in cases of serious professional misconduct.
- Overseeing teacher inductions.
- Awarding Qualified Teacher Status and Early Years Teacher Status.

In April 2018, the NCTL was dissolved, with its regulatory functions shifting to the Teaching Regulation Agency and its remaining responsibilities absorbed by the Department for Education.

== History ==
The National College for Teaching and Leadership was established on 29 March 2013, from a merge of the National College for School Leadership and the Teaching Agency. Originally, the NCSL was founded in 2000 as a non-departmental public body, but it became an executive agency in 2012.

The college operated a Learning and Conference Centre in Nottingham, designed by Sir Michael Hopkins and located on the Jubilee Campus of the University of Nottingham. Opened in 2002 by Prime Minister Tony Blair, the building cost £28 million and was dubbed the "Sandhurst of teachers".

== Key Activities ==
The NCTL's primary activities included:

- Teacher Training Funding: Provided £210 million for bursaries and salary contributions to meet recruitment targets.
- STEM Recruitment Projects: Delivered initiatives to attract teachers in science, technology, engineering, and mathematics.
- Teaching Schools Alliances: Supported 576 alliances for school-led training and professional development.
- National Leaders of Education: Designated 1,134 leaders to assist underperforming schools.
- Headship Programs: Sponsored 9,895 participants in leadership qualifications.
- Misconduct Investigations: Managed over 1,000 cases and conducted hearings on teacher misconduct.
- Recruitment Campaigns: Promoted teaching careers through media, TV, and digital campaigns.

== Legacy and Transition ==
Following its dissolution in 2018, the NCTL's regulatory functions were transferred to the Teaching Regulation Agency, while broader policy and teacher development responsibilities shifted back to the Department for Education. The closure aimed to streamline oversight and improve efficiency.

== See also ==
Training and Development Agency for Schools
