= ESFA =

ESFA may refer to

- Education and Skills Funding Agency, a former agency of the UK Department for Education
- English Schools' Football Association
