= Learning and Skills Council =

UK non-departmental public body

- Logo
- Abbreviation: LSC
- Founded: 1 April 2001; 25 years ago
- Dissolved: 31 March 2010; 16 years ago
- Legal status: Non-departmental public body
- Purpose: Further education in England
- Location: Cheylesmore House, Cheylesmore, Coventry, England
- Region served: England
- Members: Regional LSCs
- Chief Executive: Geoff Russell
- Main organ: National Council
- Parent organization: BIS and DCSF
- Budget: £12.07 bn (2008–09)
- Website: LSC

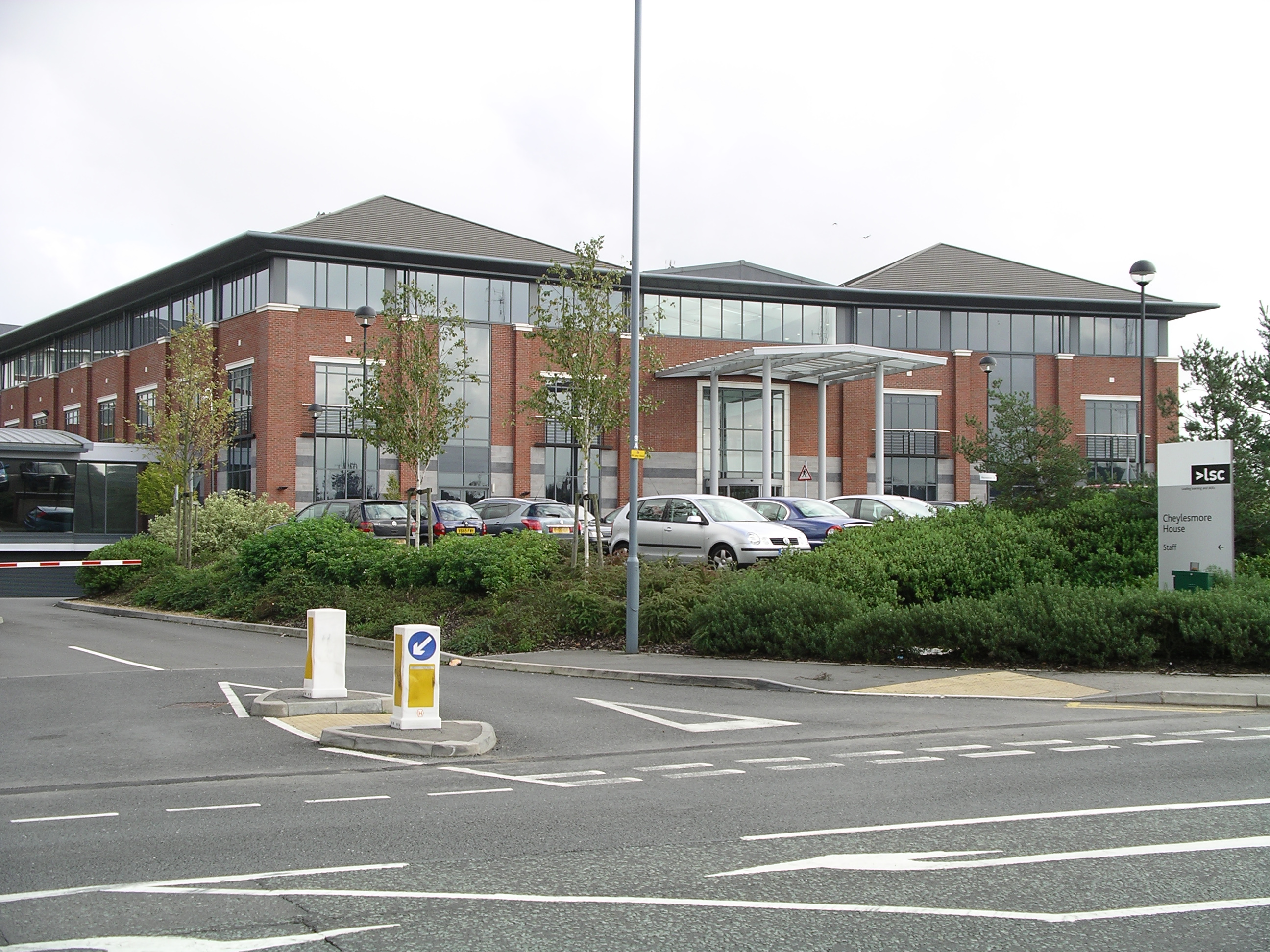
Cheylesmore House, Cheylesmore, Coventry

The Learning and Skills Council (LSC) was a non-departmental public body jointly sponsored by the Department for Business, Innovation and Skills (BIS) and the Department for Children, Schools and Families (DCSF) in England. It closed on 31 March 2010 and was replaced by the Skills Funding Agency and the Young People's Learning Agency.

== History ==
The LSC was established in April 2001, under the Learning and Skills Act 2000. It replaced the 72 training and enterprise councils and the Further Education Funding Council for England. In 2006 it had an annual budget of £10.4 billion. It was described as Britain's largest Quango.

Until June 2007, it was sponsored by the former Department for Education and Skills (DfES).

=== Economic mismanagement in college re-building ===
In July 2009, the Public Accounts Committee described the LSC's handling of its college building programme as 'catastrophic mismanagement'. It resulted in a £2.7 billion debt, with 144 college building contracts having to be terminated abruptly, and leaving many colleges with huge financial penalties for breach of contract with civil engineering companies. 23 colleges have debts of more than 40% of their annual income, with some facing possible financial collapse. The re-building programme had renovated over half of England's colleges since 2001.

=== Abolition ===
On 17 March 2008 the abolition of the LSC was announced; funding responsibilities for 16- to 19-year-old learners were to transfer to Education Funding Agency and the Skills Funding Agency, which was created to distribute funding for apprentices and learners in further education colleges.

The Machinery of Government announcement heralded the end of the LSC, to make way for the Young Peoples Learning Agency and the Skills Funding Agency, reporting to DCSF and BIS respectively. These changes started in April 2009 and were completed by March 2010.

=== Mark Haysom's resignation ===
Mark Haysom CBE, the second chief executive of the LSC, announced that he was stepping down from his role on 23 March 2009 - taking accountability as Chief Executive for difficulties that the LSC had encountered with a college (PFI) rebuilding programme. He was replaced by Geoff Russell, formerly of accountants KPMG.

== Function ==
The LSC was responsible for planning and funding further education (post-16 education and training other than higher education) in England.

=== Initiatives ===
- Train to Gain in September 2006

== Organisation ==
=== National office ===
The LSC had a national office in Cheylesmore House, Cheylesmore, Coventry, nine regional offices and 47 local Learning and Skills Council offices. The LSC's national office was not a typical headquarters – its main role was to produce guidelines and targets for its 47 local offices.

It was announced in 2005 that the LSC's organisation structure would change as part of the Agenda for Change programme, creating a streamlined configuration with more focus on the regional dimension. Although management and administration has been restructured on regional lines, the 47 local Learning and Skills councils were retained.

=== Redundancies ===
Around 1,300 jobs were lost, 500 from the Coventry headquarters, the remainder from local offices. The restructuring process was challenged by the PCS Union, with a strike that took place on 28 April 2006, and a work-to-rule commencing in May 2006. The work-to-rule ceased on 26 June 2006 after PCS and LSC representatives reached agreement.

=== Staff ===
During its lifetime the LSC had three chief executives: John Harwood, Mark Haysom and Geoff Russell.

=== Regions ===
There were nine regions.

- East of England - Ipswich
- East Midlands - Meridian Business Park (M1/M69 junction), Leicester
- London - five offices in Stratford (East), Hounslow (West), Croydon (South), Palmers Green (North), and Centre Point on New Oxford Street (Central)
- North East - Team Valley, Gateshead
- North West - Arndale Centre, Manchester
- South East - Brighton and Reading
- South West - Bristol
- West Midlands - Birmingham
- Yorkshire and the Humber - Bradford

== Criticism ==
Former leader of the CBI, Sir Digby Jones, was critical of the LSC during his time as the UK government's skills envoy. Speaking of the LSC management and outcomes, he said: "It is what I call the British Leyland model - you put a lot of money in at the top and an Austin Allegro comes out at the bottom. The money has not been spent in the right way and it is not delivering what the employers want."

There has also been significant press criticism for its handling of EMAs, capital, adult funding and numerous other areas of work especially by its own staff over its handling of various restructures and more recently its closure and transfer of powers to the 2/3 successor bodies and 150 local authorities.

== Similar organisations ==
The equivalent body in Wales was ELWa. In Scotland, colleges are funded by the Scottish Funding Council.

Also in England, until 2006, there was the Learning and Skills Development Agency, which split into the Quality Improvement Agency and Learning and Skills Network in March 2006.

== See also ==
- Education in England
- Higher Education Funding Council for England
- Lifelong learning
- Qualifications and Curriculum Authority
- Vocational education
- Business Link
- National Employer Service (for large companies)
- UK Commission for Employment and Skills
