= Further Education Funding Council =

Further Education Funding Council may refer to:

- Further Education Funding Council for England
- Further Education Funding Council for Wales
