= GIAA =

GIAA may refer to:

- Antonio B. Won Pat International Airport
- God Is an Astronaut, an Irish band
- Guild of Italian American Actors, United States
- Government Internal Audit Agency, an executive agency of the government of the United Kingdom
