= National Assessment Agency =

The National Assessment Agency (NAA) was, until December 2008, a subsidiary unit of the Qualifications and Curriculum Authority (QCA), an executive non-departmental public body (NDPB) of the Department for Education and Skills (now the Department for Education) in England and Wales. The agency was based on Bolton Street in west London.

== History ==
First announced in November 2003, the agency was not officially launched until April 2004. The agency took over the delivery and administration of the National Curriculum Tests in England, previously undertaken by the QCA to whom they are accountable.

== Functions ==
As well as being responsible for the national curriculum tests, the agency worked work with examination bodies in further reforms of the GCSE and A-level examinations in England and Wales.

=== Examination reforms ===
The agency claimed that it would modernise the examination system, for which it was given a remit from the government of £100m. The remit covered a two-year period from 2004 to 2006. The NAA's Managing Director was David Gee. He was forced to leave on 16 December 2008.

=== Administration of tests ===
Whilst the NAA took over the administrative task of test delivery, QCA retained their role in regulating testing standards. Prior to the launch of the NAA, Charles Clarke, the then Secretary of State for Education and Skills stated that the separation of these two roles, made possible by the creation of the new agency, would decrease what was regarded by the government as conflicting responsibilities.
