= Nicholas Tate =

Nicholas Tate may refer to:

- Nicholas Tate (schoolmaster) (born 1943), English educationist
- Nicholas Tate III, fictional character in the 2001 novel Area 7
- Nick Tate (born 1942), Australian actor
