= Young People's Learning Agency =

- Abbreviation: YPLA
- Formation: April 2010
- Legal status: Non-departmental public body
- Purpose: Further education in England
- Location: Cheylesmore House, Quinton Road, Cheylesmore, Coventry, England
- Region served: England
- Members: Regional YPLAs
- Chief Executive: Peter Lauener
- Main organ: YPLA Board (Chairman - Les Walton)
- Parent organization: Department for Education
- Affiliations: Skills Funding Agency
- Website: YPLA

The Young People's Learning Agency for England, commonly referred to as the Young People's Learning Agency (YPLA), was a UK government body, based in Coventry, which funded further education for 16- to 19-year-olds in England. It closed on 31 March 2012, when its responsibilities were transferred to the newly created Education Funding Agency.

== History ==
The YPLA was established by the Apprenticeships, Skills, Children and Learning Act 2009. On 1 April 2010 it replaced the Learning and Skills Council (LSC), which was the UK's largest non-departmental public body or quango. Other statutory powers and duties previously within the remit of the LSC were transferred to the Skills Funding Agency and local authorities in England.

Under the Education Act 2011 the YPLA ceased to exist on 31 March 2012. Some statutory responsibilities reverted to the Secretary of State for Education, while many of the YPLA's functions were transferred to the newly created Education Funding Agency.

== Function ==
The YPLA funded provision of further education for 16–19 year olds in England, including education delivered by academies, further education colleges and sixth-form colleges.

== Structure ==
It was a non-departmental public body of the Department for Education.

=== Regions ===
- East Midlands - Meridian Business Park, Braunstone Town, Leicestershire
- East of England - Ipswich
- London - Great Smith Street, London
- North East - Team Valley, Gateshead
- North West - Arndale Centre, Manchester
- South East - Guildford
- South West - Bristol and Plymouth
- West Midlands - Birmingham
- Yorkshire and the Humber - Bradford

== See also ==
- Higher Education Funding Council for England
- Education in England
