= Aimhigher =

The Aimhigher logo

Aimhigher was an umbrella term to describe initiatives aimed at widening participation in UK higher education, particularly among students from non-traditional backgrounds, minority groups and disabled persons.

Aimhigher was an initiative by the former Department for Education and Skills (DfES), working with the Higher Education Funding Council for England (HEFCE).

Aimhigher was created in 2004 through the integration of two earlier initiatives, Partnerships for Progression (P4P) and Excellence Challenge, bringing together a wide range of partners, including universities, colleges, schools, training providers and the Connexions service. On the 25 November 2010, David Willetts, the universities and science minister, announced the closure of the programme at the end of academic year 2010/11 (31 July 2011).

Aimhigher operated in England on a national, regional and area basis, including:

- A range of projects at national level
- Nine regions undertaking cross-regional activities (Although this regional structure ended in July 2008)
- 45 areas where most of the planning and delivery takes place

In 2008, the Aimhigher student portal website was merged into the Directgov web resource, and to create an archive of the initiative's activities but that has since been removed. Information about Aimhigher is no longer available on the UK Government website but only on the Internet Archive, for example in the archive of the Aimhigher Practitioner Website.
