= Train to Gain =

UK government vocational training initiative

Train to Gain logo

Train to Gain (T2G) was a UK government-funded initiative to deliver vocational training to employed adults. It was discontinued in 2010.

Train to Gain was designed to deliver vocational training to employed individuals in the UK, primarily those in the 25+ age band who did not already have a Full Level 2 Qualification, via the Skills Funding Agency, formerly the Learning and Skills Council (LSC). The initiative was rolled out nationally in September 2006. Train to Gain formed a part of the Employer Responsive training model. On 24 May 2010, the UK government announced a £200 million reduction in this programme as part of its planned £6.2 billion reduction in expenditure in the 2010–11 government financial year. The Train to Gain brand was discontinued in July 2010.

== Background ==
Train to Gain was designed to ameliorate the skills deficiency in the UK identified by the Leitch review. The purported idea of the service was to offer skills advice and match business needs with Further Education and training providers. The service also identified any funding or grants that could be used to offset the investment in training. The support and advice offered by Train to Gain was claimed to be flexible, responsive and offered at a time and place to suit businesses.

The supposed appeal to employers was that they received targeted, quality-approved training to upskill their staff in line with their individual and business-related needs. The appeal to employees was allegedly that they were invested in, given training to help them in their role and the opportunity to certify their existing skills. In addition to this, there was funding available to improve their overall skills and levels of literacy and numeracy.

Despite these benefits, a National Audit Office report published in July 2009 "concluded that over its full lifetime the programme has not provided good value for money."

== The Skills Brokerage service ==
Train to Gain was designed to maximise on the effectiveness of the Skills Brokerage — Skills Brokers liaise with employers to identify their skill needs and then provide a matching service with appropriate training providers. Thus Train to Gain could also reference the entirety of employer training and liaison.

== Learner eligibility ==
The fundamental criteria for eligibility for Train to Gain core funding were:

- No Full Level 2 or higher (equivalent to 5 GCSEs at A*-C)
- 25 and over
- EU resident for the last 3 years
- Employed (by an English employer)

Learners in the 19–25 age band were eligible for funding through Train to Gain where an apprenticeship would not be considered appropriate, for example where the learner was on a temporary contract. Apprenticeships were the UK government's preferred route for vocational training in this age group. Learners below the age of 19 could not be funded through Train to Gain.

== Qualification eligibility ==
Qualifications that were eligible for funding via Train to Gain were identified as such in the LSC's Learning Aims Database (LAD). These were primarily NVQs at level 2 or level 3 alongside Skills for Life at levels 1 & 2.

== Flexibilities ==
During the course of the 07/08 contract year the LSC released several additional "flexibilities" applying to learner eligibility. These allowed volunteers to access the Train to Gain service, as well as self-employed learners. A further flexibility allowed exemption from the criteria concerning prior attainment (i.e. no full level 2), for learners coming through the local employment partnership (LEP) route. That is to say, those learners who found work through Jobcentre Plus and subsequently came on to Train to Gain.

The LSC outlined further enhancements to the Train to Gain service in a letter to training providers. These include additional level 2s and level 3s for those who already had them (under specific circumstances), accessibility to Skills for life for those ineligible due to prior attainment and funding for Skills for life at levels other than 1 and 2.
