= Teaching Regulation Agency =

Executive agency in England

Executive Agency overview
- Formed: 1 April 2018
- Preceding Executive Agency: National College for Teaching and Leadership
- Jurisdiction: England
- Headquarters: Cheylesmore House, 5 Quinton Road, Coventry
- Employees: 99 (2024/25)
- Parent department: Department for Education
- Website: www.gov.uk/government/organisations/teaching-regulation-agency

The Teaching Regulation Agency (TRA) is an executive agency of the Department for Education responsible for regulation of the teaching profession in England.

== Background ==
Between 2000 and 2012, the teaching profession in England was regulated by a professional body known as the General Teaching Council for England (GTCE). The GTCE was abolished in 2012 with some of its functions being assumed by the Department of Education. In 2013, a National College for Teaching and Leadership (NCTL) was established which was replaced by the present Teaching Regulation Agency in 2018.

== Responsibilities ==
The Teaching Regulation Agency is responsible for:

- Regulating the teaching profession in England
- Conducting teacher misconduct hearings
- Maintaining a record of teachers, trainee teachers and those who hold qualified teacher status.

== See also ==
- Education in England
