= Department for Education =

UK Government ministerial department

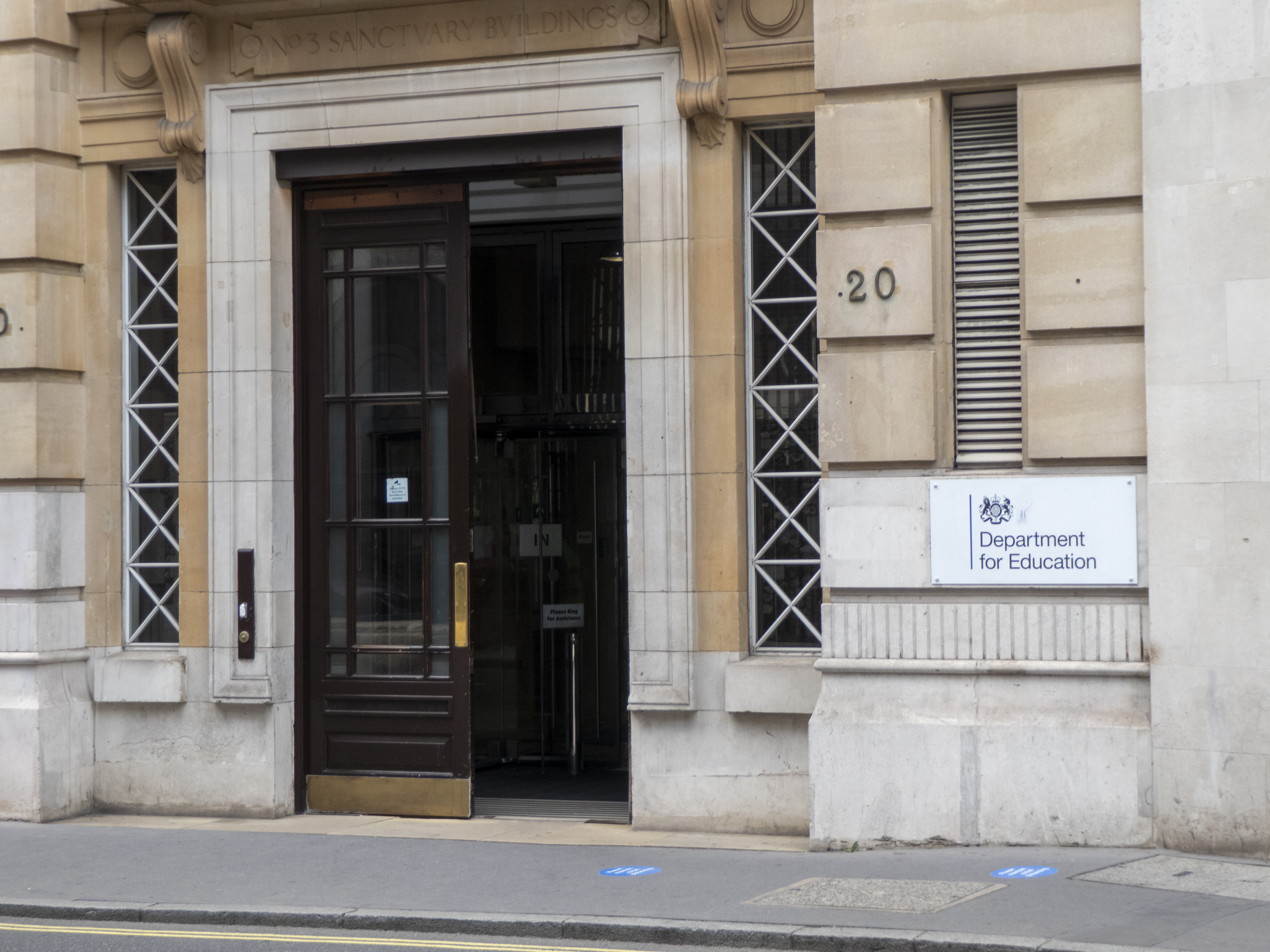
- 20 Great Smith Street, Westminster

Department overview
- Formed: 2010
- Preceding agencies: Department for Children, Schools and Families; Higher education, apprenticeships and skills responsibilities of the Department for Business, Innovation and Skills (from 2016)
- Jurisdiction: Government of the United Kingdom
- Headquarters: Sanctuary Buildings, Great Smith Street, London
- Employees: 3,885 (2012)
- Annual budget: £58.2 billion (2015–16)
- Secretary of state responsible: Lucy Powell, Secretary of State for Education
- Department executives: Susan Acland-Hood, Permanent Secretary; Jane Cunliffe, Chief Operating Officer
- Child agencies: Standards and Testing Agency; Teaching Regulation Agency
- Website: gov.uk/dfe

- Applies to: England
- Relates to: Education in England

Other UK counterparts
- Northern Ireland: Executive Office (children and young people); Department of Education
- Scotland: Education and Justice Directorates
- Wales: Welsh Government

The Department for Education (DfE) is a ministerial department of the Government of the United Kingdom. It is responsible for child protection, child services, education (compulsory, further, and higher education), apprenticeships, and wider skills in England.

A Department for Education previously existed between 1992, when the Department of Education and Science was renamed, and 1995, when it was merged with the Department for Employment to become the Department for Education and Employment.

The current Secretary of State for Education is Lucy Powell MP and Susan Acland-Hood is the permanent secretary.

Its responsibilities are devolved policies, therefore it does not have responsibility in Scotland, Wales or Northern Ireland, with the Scottish Government, Welsh Government, and Northern Ireland Executive each having their own departments responsible for education in their respective jurisdictions. The expenditure, administration, and policy of the Department of Education are scrutinised by the Education Select Committee.

== History ==
The DfE was formed on 12 May 2010 by the incoming Coalition Government, taking on the responsibilities and resources of the Department for Children, Schools and Families (DCSF).

In June 2012 the Department for Education committed a breach of the UK's Data Protection Act due to a security flaw on its website which made email addresses, passwords and comments of people responding to consultation documents available for download.

In July 2016, the department took over responsibilities for higher and further education and for apprenticeship from the dissolved Department for Business, Innovation and Skills.

=== Predecessor bodies ===
- Committee of the Privy Council on Education, 1839–1899
- Education Department, 1856–1899
- Board of Education, 1899–1944
- Ministry of Education, 1944–1964
- Department of Education and Science, 1964–1992
- Department for Education, 1992–1995
- Department for Education and Employment (DfEE), 1995–2001
- Department for Education and Skills (DfES), 2001–2007
- Department for Children, Schools and Families (DCSF), 2007–2010

== Responsibilities ==
The department is led by the secretary of state for education. The permanent secretary from December 2020 is Susan Acland-Hood. DfE is responsible for education, children's services, higher and further education policy, apprenticeships, and wider skills in England, and equalities. The predecessor department employed the equivalent of 2,695 staff as of April 2008 and as at June 2016, DfE had reduced its workforce to the equivalent of 2,301 staff. In 2015–16, the DfE has a budget of £58.2bn, which includes £53.6bn resource spending and £4.6bn of capital investments.

== Ministers ==
The Department for Education's ministers are as follows, with cabinet members in bold:

Minister	Portrait	Office	Portfolio
**Lucy Powell** MP		Secretary of State for Education	Overall responsibility for the department; early years; children's social care; teacher recruitment and retention; the school curriculum; school improvement; academies and free schools; further education; apprenticeships and skills; higher education.
Georgia Gould MP		Minister of State for School Standards	School improvement, intervention and inspection (including links with Ofsted); regional improvement for standards and excellence (RISE); special educational needs and disabilities (SEND) and high needs; alternative provision; special schools (including independent special schools (ISS)); initial teacher training and incentives; teacher retention including the early career framework and teacher training entitlement; Teaching Regulation Agency (TRA); school leadership; school governance; teacher pay and pensions; school support staff; core school funding; pupil premium; school productivity; qualifications (including links with Ofqual); national curriculum; access to sport, arts and music in education, working with other departments; admissions and pupil movement; relationships and sex education and health education (RSHE) review
Baroness Smith of Malvern		Minister of State for Skills	Governance, intervention and accountability of further education colleges; funding for education and training, provision and outcomes for 16- to 19-year-olds; further education financial stability and workforce; access to higher education, participation and lifelong learning entitlement; quality of higher education and the student experience (including the Office for Students); student finance (including the Student Loans Company); technical and vocational qualifications (level 3 and below), including T Levels; higher technical education (levels 4 and 5); careers advice; support for young people aged 16 to 19 not in employment, education or training (NEET); skills strategy and delivery; technical excellence colleges; international education. Jointly with Department for Work and Pensions.
Josh MacAlister MP		Parliamentary Under-Secretary of State for Children and Families	Children’s social care; children in care and children in need; looked-after children; child protection; adoption; kinship care and family justice; fostering and regional care cooperatives; care leavers; children’s social care workforce; unaccompanied asylum-seeking children; single unique identifier for children and use of children’s social care data; child protection, safeguarding and serious incidents; local authority intervention and improvement; family support including the families first programme; tackling antisemitism; prevention of serious violence in schools and post-16 settings; counter extremism in schools and post-16 settings; out-of-school settings; school safeguarding and guidance on keeping children safe in education; creation of new free schools; maintenance and improvement of the education estate; environmental sustainability in the education sectors; deputising for the Secretary of State for Education in emergencies
Paul Waugh MP		Parliamentary Under-Secretary of State for Early Education	Early years education including for children with special educational needs and disabilities (SEND); childcare and the home learning environment; early years workforce; early communication skills and early intervention; Best Start Family Hubs and parenting; breakfast clubs; school food, including free school meals; holiday activities and food (HAF) programme; school attendance, including register of children who are not in school; reception admissions; changes to existing schools; home-to-school transport; mental health support in schools; behaviour, preventing bullying and exclusions in schools; school uniform; young carers; independent schools; illegal schools; faith schools; intervention in failing schools and school improvement; use of data, digital technology and artificial intelligence (AI) in education; use of research, science and evidence at DfE

== Board ==
The management board is made up of:

- Permanent secretary – Susan Acland-Hood
- Director-General, Families – Justin Russell
- Director-General, Regions – John Edwards
- Director-General, Skills – Julia Kinniburgh
- Director-General, Schools – Juliet Chua
- Director-General, Strategy – Tony Foot
- Chief operating officer – Jane Cunliffe
- Chief executive, Education & Skills Funding Agency – David Withey

Non-executive board members:

- Marion Plant; CEO of the Midland Academies Trust and principal
- Ruby McGregor-Smith, Baroness McGregor-Smith; former chief executive of Mitie Group
- Ian Ferguson; businessman

== Locations ==
As at 2 August 2016, the DfE has five main sites:

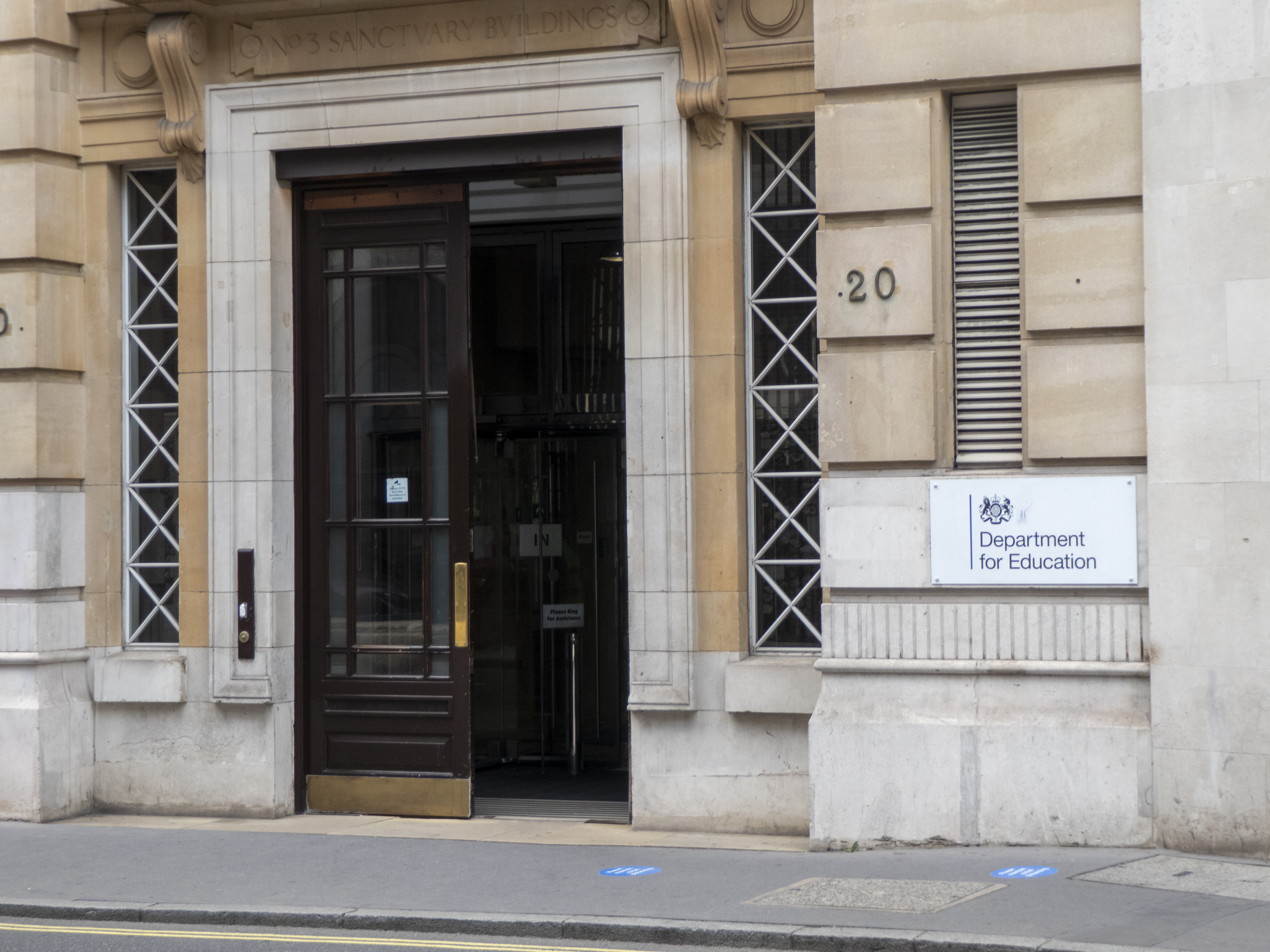
- The entrance to the Great Smith Street site
  Sanctuary Buildings, Great Smith Street, London
- Piccadilly Gate, Manchester
- 2 St Paul's Place, Sheffield
- Bishopsgate House, Darlington
- Cheylesmore House, Coventry

== Executive agencies and public bodies ==
=== Executive agencies ===
==== Education and Skills Funding Agency ====
The Education and Skills Funding Agency (ESFA) was formed on 1 April 2017 following the merger of the Education Funding Agency (EFA) and the Skills Funding Agency (SFA). Previously the EFA was responsible for distributing funding for state education in England for 3- to 19-year-olds, as well as managing the estates of schools, and colleges and the SFA was responsible for funding skills training for further education in England and running the National Apprenticeship Service and the National Careers Service. The EFA was formed on 1 April 2012 by bringing together the functions of two non-departmental public bodies, the Young People's Learning Agency and Partnerships for Schools. The SFA was formed on 1 April 2010, following the closure of the Learning and Skills Council. David Withey was the agency's chief executive. The ESFA closed on 31 March 2025 and was integrated into the core department.

==== Skills England ====
Skills England replaced the Institute for Apprenticeships and Technical Education (IfATE) from June 2025. In September 2025, Skills England transferred to the Department for Work and Pensions, along with responsibility for apprenticeships, adult further education, skills, training and careers.

==== Standards and Testing Agency ====
The Standards and Testing Agency (STA) is responsible for developing and delivering all statutory assessments for school pupils in England. It was formed on 1 October 2011 and took over the functions of the Qualifications and Curriculum Development Agency. The STA is regulated by the examinations regulator, Ofqual.

==== Teaching Regulation Agency ====
The Teaching Regulation Agency (TRA) is responsible for regulation of the teaching profession, including misconduct hearings. Its predecessors include the National College for Teaching and Leadership (to 2018), the Teaching Agency (to 2013) and the Training and Development Agency for Schools (from 1994).

=== Public bodies ===
The DfE is also supported by 10 public bodies:

Non-ministerial departments	Ofqual; Ofsted
Executive non-departmental public bodies	LocatED; Oak National Academy; Office for Students; Office of the Children's Commissioner; Social Work England; Student Loans Company
Advisory non-departmental public bodies	School Teachers' Review Body
Other	Office of the Schools Adjudicator

== Devolution ==
Education, youth and children's policy is devolved elsewhere in the United Kingdom. The department's main devolved counterparts are as follows:

- Scottish Government
  - Education and Justice Directorates
- Welsh Government
  - Department for Education and Skills
- Northern Ireland Executive
  - Executive Office (children and young people)
  - Department of Education

== National Curriculum 2014 ==
The Department for Education released a new National Curriculum for schools in England for September 2014, which included 'Computing'. Following Michael Gove's speech in 2012, the subject of Information Communication Technology (ICT) has been disapplied and replaced by Computing. With the new curriculum, materials have been written by commercial companies, to support non-specialist teachers, for example, '100 Computing Lessons' by Scholastic. The Computing at Schools organisation has created a 'Network of Teaching Excellence'to support schools with the new curriculum.

== Post-16 area reviews ==
In 2015, the department announced a major restructuring of the further education sector, through 37 area reviews of post-16 provision. The proposals were criticised by NUS Vice President for Further Education Shakira Martin for not sufficiently taking into account the impact on learners; the Sixth Form Colleges' Association similarly criticised the reviews for not directly including providers of post-16 education other than colleges, such as school and academy sixth forms and independent training providers.

== Funding and grants ==
In 2018, The Department for Education confirmed their commitment to forming positive relationships with the voluntary and community sector.

In 2020 the department began funding the National Tutoring Programme which employed private companies to deliver the tuition including at least one which uses children as tutors, paying them £1.57 per hour. Tutors received up to £25 of the between £72 and £84 per hour the government paid the companies.

In 2020, the Department for Education started funding the Support for Care Leavers at Risk of Homelessness and Rough Sleeping programme, which directs money to local councils allowing them to employ specialist personal advisors to support care leavers at risk of homelessness. This initiative is currently undergoing independent evaluation with results expected in Spring 2026.

== Criticism ==
In late July 2026 hackers from a group named ExfilSquad gained access to DfE records, they were able to access and extract over 600,000 lines of helpdesk data detailing staff and parent contact information. They obtained full names, email addresses, phone numbers and job titles. The hackers posted a sample of the data taken and have further demanding a payment from the DfE to not publish all the data online. This new cyber group appears to have targeted other institutions such as the police via the Police National Legal Database PNLD, alongside universities. The group may be linked to The Com (short for "The Community"), a loose affiliation of cybercriminals responsible for attacks on Marks & Spencers the Co-operative Group and Harrods. The DfE confirmed the incident and stated that they were working with National Cyber Security Centre (United Kingdom) and the National Crime Agency (NCA) on the matter.

== See also ==
- Education in England
