= Education and Learning Wales =

ELWa was an Assembly Sponsored Public Body responsible for planning and funding post-16 learning in Wales, active from 2001 to 2006. ELWa was the Welsh equivalent of the Learning and Skills Council in England, and for a time it was the largest quango in Wales. ELWa's functions are now exercised by Medr.

== Formation and activities ==
ELWa - Education and Learning Wales was the brand used by the National Council for Education and Training for Wales (NCETW), an Assembly Sponsored Public Body (ASPB) or quango established by the Learning and Skills Act 2000. The "ELWa" name was both an acronym and meant "to better" or "to profit" in the Welsh language.

NCETW merged the functions of the former training and enterprise councils in Wales with the Further Education Funding Council for Wales (FEFCW). The organisation's remit was to plan and fund post-16 learning (excluding higher education) in Wales, including further education, publicly-funded work-based training, adult community learning and school sixth forms.

NCETW/ELWa's main statutory responsibilities were to:

- Secure the provision of facilities for post-16 education and training in Wales (with the exception of higher education);
- Encourage young people and adults to participate in learning; and
- Encourage employers to participate in, and contribute to the costs of, post-16 education and training.

In its first year, the ELWa brand was shared by NCETW and the Higher Education Funding Council for Wales (HEFCW), which was a separate legal entity but initially under a single chief executive, Steve Martin. NCETW's first chair was Enid Rowlands and its corporate strategy was called "Making Learning Work for You".

== Re-organisation ==
Initially the ELWa brand was used by both NCETW and HEFCW, and both organisations shared a common executive with some joint staff co-located in Llanishen - a legacy of arrangements in the 1990s when ELWa's predecessor FEFCW shared offices and functions with HEFCW. NCETW also maintained the former TEC offices in Bedwas, Swansea, Newtown and St Asaph.

Following a review in 2002 the Welsh Minister for Education and Lifelong Learning, Jane Davidson, decided that each Council should have a full-time dedicated Chief Executive and Director of Finance. Around the same time it also became apparent that there was no legal basis for the two Councils jointly to employ staff. Subsequently the brand name ELWa was retained solely by NCETW.

== Criticism ==
During its short history, ELWa attracted criticism for a series of failures in financial management, poor risk management and organisational restructuring. Prior to ELWa's demise, many of the Welsh FE colleges it funded were in debt and Coleg Gwent made cutbacks which attracted negative publicity for the quango. Cardiff Chamber of Commerce was forced into liquidation in 2008 by financial liabilities it originally owed to ELWa.

== Merger with Welsh Assembly Government ==
ELWa was merged with the Welsh Assembly Government on 1 April 2006, along with the Welsh Development Agency and Wales Tourist Board, as part of the "bonfire of the quangos". While there were some criticisms that having Welsh Ministers decide funding allocations to education providers would be "Stalinist', FE News argued that ELWa "only had itself to blame" for its abolition.

ELWa's functions were then exercised by the Welsh Government's Department for Education and Skills (DfES) prior to the creation of a new arm's length body, Medr, in 2024.
