= Youth Opportunities Programme =

The Youth Opportunities Programme was a UK government scheme for helping 16- to 18-year-olds into employment. It was introduced in 1978 under the Labour government of James Callaghan, was expanded in 1980 by Margaret Thatcher's Conservative government, and ran until 1983 when it was replaced by the Youth Training Scheme.

People taking part in the YOP scheme were informally known as "YOPpers", or "Yoppies".
