= Nicholas Tate (schoolmaster) =

British schoolmaster and historian (born 1943)

Edward Nicholas Tate CBE (born 18 December 1943) is an English historian and educationist.

After heading the Qualifications and Curriculum Authority, he was headmaster of Winchester College, director general of the International School of Geneva, and chairman of the trustees of the Richmond American University London.

== Early life ==
Born in Stoke-on-Trent, Staffordshire, Tate is the son of Joseph Edwin Tate, a senior HM Customs and Excise officer, and his wife Eva Elsie Hopkinson. He was educated at Huddersfield New College, Balliol College, Oxford, where he was a scholar, the University of Bristol, where he gained a Postgraduate Certificate in Education, and the University of Liverpool, where he graduated PhD in 1985.

== Career ==
Tate began his career as a schoolteacher, later working in teacher-training colleges in England and Scotland, and in the world of school examination boards. In 1989, he joined the National Curriculum Council for England. In 1994, he was appointed as chief executive of the School Curriculum and Assessment Authority and in 1997 of the Qualifications and Curriculum Authority.

In July 1994, in an article in the Times Educational Supplement, and in a widely reported speech in July 1995, Tate caused a 'great history debate' when he stated that the school curriculum in general, and the history curriculum in particular, did not pay enough attention to national identity. He argued for "a history curriculum which more explicitly introduces pupils to the majority national culture and... makes clear some of its greatest achievements". His speech in July 1995 was covered by an article in The Daily Telegraph headed "Curriculum chief backs Britishness" and another in The Guardian headed "Teach children to be British stirs up a storm".

In November 1995, Tate further urged that children should be taught how to be good citizens, to halt a national moral decline. In February 1996, he suggested that Latin and Greek should play a far more important role in schools from the beginning of the new century. Later that month, he advised that schools "must adopt a modern Ten Commandments to give children a moral grounding and teach them the difference between right and wrong."

In August 2000, shortly after leaving his curriculum post to return to teaching, Tate pressed his points in The Sunday Times, in an article entitled "They come not to praise England but to bury it". He proposed that education "should include the transmission to the next generation of British values".

From September 2000 to August 2003, Tate was headmaster of Winchester College; then until 2011 he was director general of the International School of Geneva, home of the International Baccalaureate. In 2008, he said of his school "We have 136 nationalities and 86 mother tongues". In one class, every student came from a different country.

From 2011 to 2013, Tate was Chairman of International Education Systems.

In 2014, he was vice-chairman of trustees of the Richmond American University London, and in 2017 became chairman. In 2018 he noted that it was "the only University which offers all students both a UK and US degree". He resigned from this position in August 2019. In 2017, he was also a governor of Aiglon College in Switzerland.

Tate has written books for schools and articles on history and education.

== Personal life ==
In 1973, at Weymouth, Tate married Nadya Grove, a daughter of George Alfred Grove, and they have one son and two daughters.

== Selected publications ==
- Pizzaro and the Incas (Addison-Wesley Longman, 1981, ISBN 978-0582205475)
- Countdown to GCSE History (London: Nelson Thornes, 1986, ISBN 978-0333422533)
- History (GCSE Coursework) (London: Nelson Thornes, 1987, ISBN 978-0333443170)
- Make the Grade in General Certificate of Secondary Education Modern World History (London: Teach Yourself, 1989, ISBN 978-0340501481)
- Modern World History, Study Aids: GCSE (London: Teach Yourself, 1989, ISBN 978-0340512739)
- Teach Yourself Study AIDS: GCSE British Social & Economic History (London: Hodder Arnold, 1991, ISBN 978-0340527078)
- What is Education for? The view of the great thinkers and their relevance today (John Catt, 2015, ISBN 978-1398384040)
- The Conservative Case for Education: against the current (New York & Abingdon: Routledge, 2017, ISBN 978-1-138-05551-3)

== Honours ==
- Commander of the Order of the British Empire, 2001

== Notes ==
Academic offices
Preceded by James Sabben-Clare	Headmaster of Winchester College; 2000–2003	Succeeded by Thomas Richard Cookson
