= PNLD =

The PNLD (Police National Legal Database) is a British online police information resource of criminal justice legislation accessible online. The organisation is managed by the West Yorkshire Police and its database contains Acts of Parliament, Common Law, Regulations, Orders and Byelaws, Case Summaries and the National Standard Offence Wordings and Codes that are used in the court system of England and Wales.

PNLD is funded through subscriptions from the 43 home office police forces in England and Wales, the British Transport Police, the Crown Prosecution Service, the Independent Office for Police Conduct, and His Majesty's Courts and Tribunals Service.

== Background ==
PNLD was developed using the criminal law notes used by the Detective Training Wing of the West Yorkshire Police. By 1994, it was transitioned to a computer database that could be more easily updated as case law and national standard offence wordings changed. The resource was initially rolled out to nineteen forces, before gaining accreditation as a Home Office product under the umbrella of PITO (Police Information Technology Organization). By 2001, all 43 Home Office police forces used it.

In 2004, an internet version of the PNLD became available on subscription via PDMS Limited. Beginning in 2005, PNLD has run an annual Criminal Law conference. Previous conferences have been hosted at Police Mutual HQ and sponsored by Oxford University Press.

In 2014, PNLD developed a free online resource for victims and witnesses with the Police and Crime Commissioner for West Yorkshire. The website launched in October 2014 with the support of Baroness Helen Newlove, the then Victims’ Commissioner for England and Wales. The website contained 400 Q&As on how victims and witnesses should be treated within the criminal justice system under the Victims’ Code and the Witness Charter, with links to national supporting organisations. This site is no longer available nationally. PNLD launched a Motoring & The Law app in November 2015 with the support of the Cabinet Office. The content is now included within the legal database.

PNLD's legal team have authored and contributed to OUP's Blackstone's Handbooks: Police Operational Handbook: Law and Blackstone's Counter-Terrorism Handbook. Other publications include Blackstone's Handbook of Ports and Border Security and Blackstone's Handbook of Cyber Crime Investigation.

In addition to the police, other users include the Trading Standards service, Ofcom, the NHS, and colleges and universities.
