= Standards and Testing Agency =

English statutory assessment provider

Executive Agency overview
- Formed: 1 October 2011
- Preceding Executive Agency: Qualifications and Curriculum Development Agency
- Jurisdiction: England
- Headquarters: Cheylesmore House, Quinton Road, Coventry
- Executive Agency executive: Gillian Hillier, CEO and Accounting Officer
- Parent department: Department for Education
- Website: gov.uk/sta

The Standards and Testing Agency (STA) is an executive agency of the Department for Education responsible for developing and delivering all statutory assessments for school pupils in England. It was formed on 1 October 2011 and took over the functions of the Qualifications and Curriculum Development Agency. The STA is regulated by the examinations regulator, Ofqual.

STA also develop the professional skills tests for trainee teachers and manage the Yellow Label Service for secure dispatch of traceable exam scripts.

== See also ==
- Education in England
- Qualifications Wales
