= Connexions Centre =

Youth support centres in England

In England, a Connexions Centre was a location, as part of the government-funded Connexions service, where young people aged thirteen to nineteen in England could go for confidential support and advice on a number of topics. The staff were known as Connexions Personal Advisers and were "trained to offer confidential advice and practical help". They were designed to give practical help to teens and youth.

The service offered advice on:

- Careers
- Education
- Work
- Relationships
- Sex and Sexual health
- Pregnancy
- Abortion
- Homelessness
- Health
- Finance
- General Advice

Some of these services were offloaded to schools when funding for the program was reduced.
