= Government Internal Audit Agency =

UK Government agency

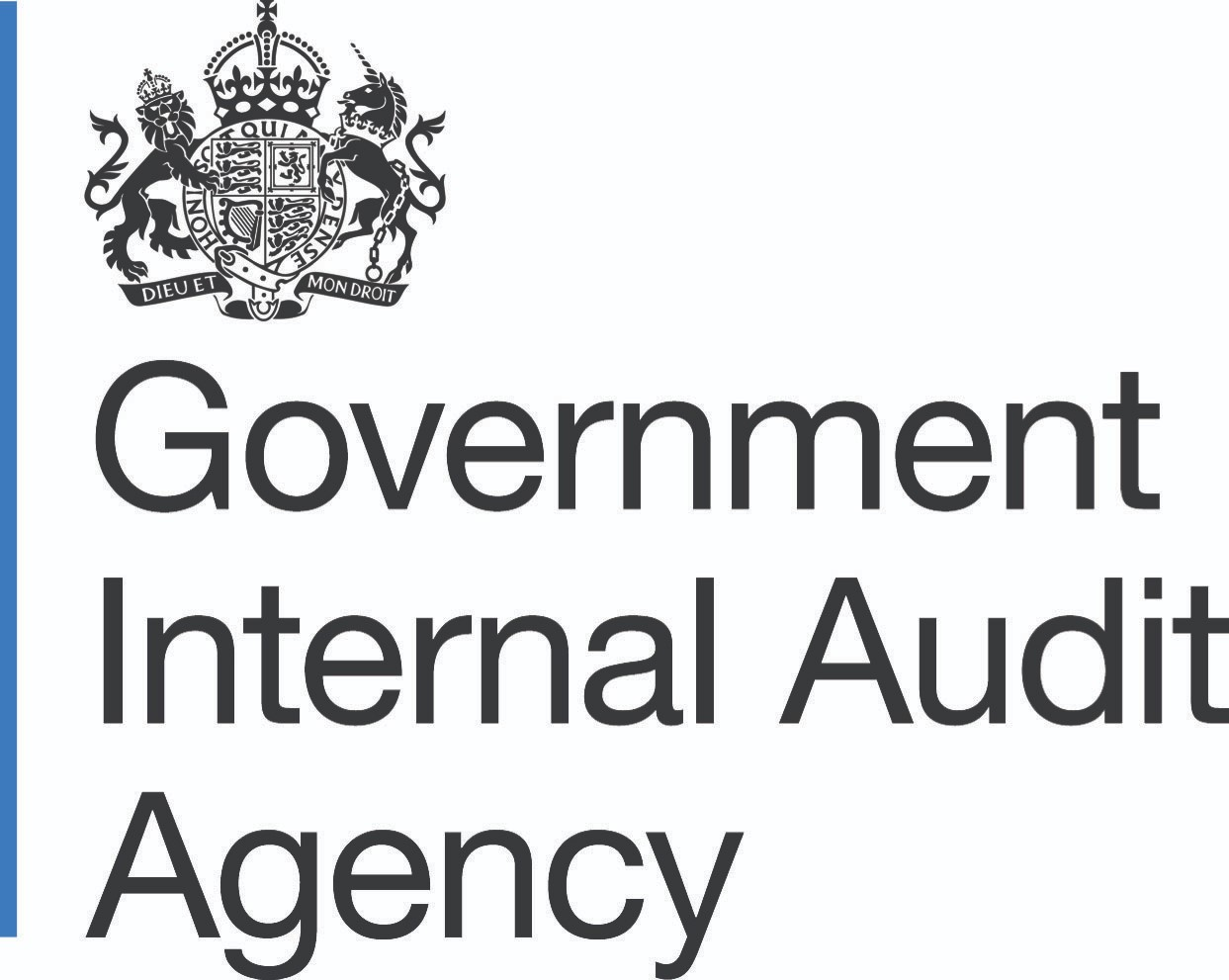
GIAA logo

The Government Internal Audit Agency (GIAA) is an executive agency of the government of the United Kingdom, sponsored by HM Treasury. It was established in April 2015, following the earlier publication of the Treasury's 2013 Financial Management Review.

The Government Internal Audit Agency supports government departments to manage public money effectively by developing better governance, risk management and internal controls. As of 2026 the GIAA employs around 500 people in 10 locations across the UK. GIAA clients include 15 government departments and over 130 associated government bodies.

As of October 2026, Paul Wallek is the Chief Executive.
