= Qualifications and Curriculum Development Agency =

Former English charity

Executive Non-Departmental Public Body overview
- Formed: 1 October 1997; 29 years ago
- Dissolved: 3 October 2011
- Superseding Executive Non-Departmental Public Body: Standards and Testing Agency
- Jurisdiction: England
- Headquarters: Earlsdon Park, Butts Lane, Coventry
- Parent department: Department for Education

The Qualifications and Curriculum Development Agency (QCDA), previously known as the Qualifications and Curriculum Authority (QCA), was a charity, and an executive non-departmental public body (NDPB) of the Department for Education. In England and Northern Ireland, the QCDA maintained and developed the National Curriculum and associated assessments, tests and examinations, advising the minister formerly known as the secretary of state for education on these matters.

Regulatory functions regarding examination and assessment boards have been transferred to Ofqual, an independent regulator.

Education and qualifications in Scotland and Wales are the responsibility of the Scottish Government and Welsh Government and their agencies. In Scotland, for example, the Scottish Qualifications Authority is the responsible body.

In May 2010 the secretary of state announced his intention to promote legislation that would transfer obligations of the QCDA to Ofqual. The newly formed Standards and Testing Agency took on the functions of the agency 3 October 2011. QCDA's chief executive officer, Andrew Hall, is also a member of the executive board of the British examination board AQA.

== Partners ==
QCDA worked closely with its main strategic partners, including the Department for Education, the Office for Standards in Education (Ofsted), employers' organisations, the Training and Development Agency for Schools (TDA), the Skills Funding Agency, the former General Teaching Council for England (GTCE) and the Sector Skills Councils (SSC).

QCDA also collaborated with the other public qualification agencies in the UK: the Scottish Qualifications Authority (SQA) and the Council for the Curriculum, Examinations and Assessment in Northern Ireland (CCEA).

QCDA had its headquarter in Coventry, United Kingdom.

== History ==
The Qualifications and Curriculum Authority (QCA) was formed on 1 October 1997, through a merger of the National Council for Vocational Qualifications (NCVQ) for vocational qualifications and the School Curriculum and Assessment Authority (SCAA) for academic qualifications. The QCA had additional powers and duties granted to it by the Education Act 1997, which established the role of the QCA. Under Section 24 of this act, QCA was granted the right to regulate all external qualifications in England.

The first Chief Executive, from 1997 to 2000, was Dr Nicholas Tate, who had previously led the SCAA for three years.

In April 2004, the QCA also launched the National Assessment Agency to take over the delivery and administration of National Curriculum assessments. The National Assessment Agency was transformed into a subdivision and its functions subsumed within the management structure of the QCA.

=== A-level grade-fixing scandal ===
On 1 September 2002, the newspaper The Observer broke a story concerning potential 'grade-fixing' in that summer's A-level results, highlighting stories from teachers and students of major discrepancies in predicted grades compared to examination results. The scandal quickly gathered steam throughout the month as more students and teachers went public with their stories. It was revealed that the Chief Executive of the OCR exam board, Ron Mclone, had sought to forcefully manage increases both in the pass rate and in achievement of the highest grade (A) by last-minute revisiting of grade thresholds, fixing the pass mark higher for a series of exams and causing a huge shift in grades for some students. Such grade inflation had become more pronounced as the Labour government's Curriculum 2000 continued to be introduced.

Large backlash from the public ensued, the results having affected thousands of students, particularly those with conditional offers from universities they subsequently failed to meet. Such offers were made based on predicted grades by teachers, requiring certain grades which students failed to meet due to their downgrading by the QCA. The QCA's reputation, and that of its then-Chair, Sir William Stubbs, was severely damaged by the affair, the QCA having been found by independent inquiry to have been "aware and complicit in what was happening at every step". Stubbs was later sacked by then-Secretary of State for Education, Estelle Morris, to "restore public confidence" in the institution. The affair was also a significant contributing factor in Morris' decision a month later to resign as Secretary of State, on 23 October 2002.

=== Formation of Ofqual ===
On 26 September 2007, DCSF announced that the regulatory functions of the QCA were to become statutorily independent with transferring QCA's obligations to Ofqual.

On 8 April 2008, Ofqual began work as the independent regulator of exams and tests in England, accountable to Parliament rather than to government ministers. The remaining work of the QCA was transferred to the Ofqual. The QCA was formally reintegrated into Ofqual when Ofqual gained statutory status.
