= Connexions (agency) =

2000–2012 UK government support service for young people

Connexions was a UK governmental information, advice, guidance and support service for young people aged 13 to 19 (up to 25 for young people with learning difficulties and/or disabilities), created in 2000 following the Learning and Skills Act.

There were Connexions Centres around the country – usually several in each county – which offered support and advice on topics including education, housing, health, relationships, drugs and finance.

Since 2012, Connexions has not been a coherent national service, following changes to the delivery of careers in England and the establishment of the National Careers Service by the Coalition government. Some local authorities have retained its branding, however.

== History ==
Connexions centre in Southend

Connexions was formerly The Careers Service, which had its organisation altered throughout the Conservative government's privatisation process in the mid-1990s.

During the period of Labour Government the Connexions service became increasingly focused on the delivery of targeted services to those who were often described as most in need of help.

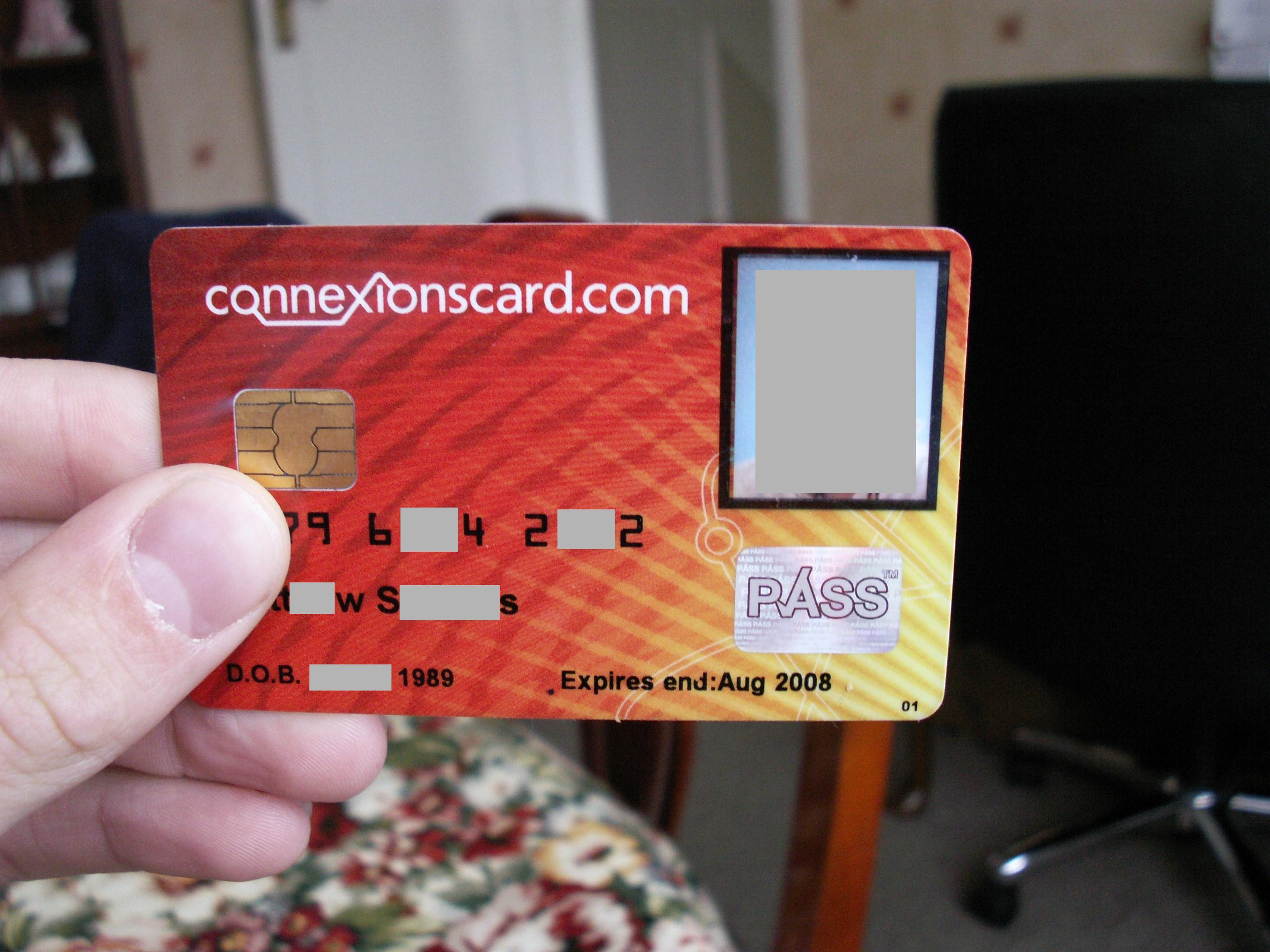
Connexions card

One interesting initiative was the introduction of the Connexions Card.

Following the 2010 election of the Conservative/Lib Dem Coalition the future of Connexions was called into question. Where Connexions was retained as a branding, it was a local decision, and there was considerable local divergence around branding and delivery. Government guidance from 2011 stated that "There will be no expectation that local authorities should provide universal careers services once the new careers service is established." The new career service referred to is the National Careers Service, which was established on 1 April 2012.

=== Perceptions of the service ===
A 2010 research report by the National Youth Agency and the Local Government Association noted that some young people were unclear about the role and function of Connexions, although those who had interacted with the service were generally positive about it.

== Structure ==
Through this process, funding that was originally given directly to local councils for the delivery of the service, was henceforth allocated directly by central government (via regional offices) to private careers companies. This meant the Labour government was more easily able to use funds previously allocated for careers services, for the creation of the Connexions service.

The service was originally intended to be constituted by professionals from a range of backgrounds (careers advisers, youth workers, counsellors, health workers, teachers etc.). However, as the funding for these other professions lay within the control of local councils it was not as accessible. The result was that the careers service in England was abolished and replaced by Connexions, but it was made up predominantly of career guidance professionals and was not really the multi-disciplinary organisation originally envisaged. However, Connexions services typically worked closely with many other services, particularly those within local government, such as the Young Offenders Team (YOT), Teenage Pregnancy Workers, Children's Services, but also Housing Associations, Job Centres, and others.

From 1 April 2008 responsibility for providing Connexions Services was transferred to local authorities in each area (rather than the Connexions Partnerships). Some chose to take services in-house, others to commission services from other providers. The brand however, remained. As a result, there was very little in terms of uniformity. Berkshire Connexions, for example, was run differently, and structured differently, to Surrey or Oxfordshire Connexions.

There were 47 Connexions Partnerships throughout the country. These partnership offices managed the Connexions service on a local level, bringing together all the key youth support services in their area. The partnership offices managed the Connexions Centres in their locality.

Following early public spending cuts under the Coalition Government Connexions services were badly hit. In many areas the service vanished altogether, whilst in others the service remained. Typically support for the NEET group has continued to be funded through the local authority, but the careers element of the Connexions service was eventually devolved to schools.

== Delivery ==
Principally, Connexions offered an impartial, client-centred, careers, information and guidance service. The staff were known as Connexions Personal Advisers, and were trained to offer confidential advice and practical help relating to a wide range of issues. The concern was that the result was a professional that was a 'jack of all trades, master of none', with many ex-career guidance professionals in particular concerned that the increased remit of their role has been detrimental to their expertise and knowledge in matters of career guidance.

A web site, Connexions Direct, offered information on various topics of potential interest to young people in England. Connexions also offered one-to-one support by telephone, SMS, and instant messaging.

=== Information sharing policy ===
Consent was nominally sought prior to sharing information, such as school attendance records, unless there was a statutory or common law duty to do so. Such consent was not necessarily limited in scope, or length of time in effect. Consequently, confidentiality may not be guaranteed.

Information sharing powers were granted under sections 114 to 121 of the Learning and Skills Act 2000, section 115 of the Crime and Disorder Act 1998 and section 12 of the Children Act 2004.

== See also ==
- Special education in the United Kingdom
- Dyslexia support in the United Kingdom
