= Skills Funding Agency =

- Successor: Education and Skills Funding Agency
- Formation: April 2010
- Dissolved: April 2017
- Legal status: Executive Agency
- Purpose: Further education in England
- Location: Cheylesmore House, Cheylesmore, Coventry, West Midlands
- Region served: England
- Chief Executive: Peter Lauener
- Parent organisation: DfE
- Website: Skills Funding Agency

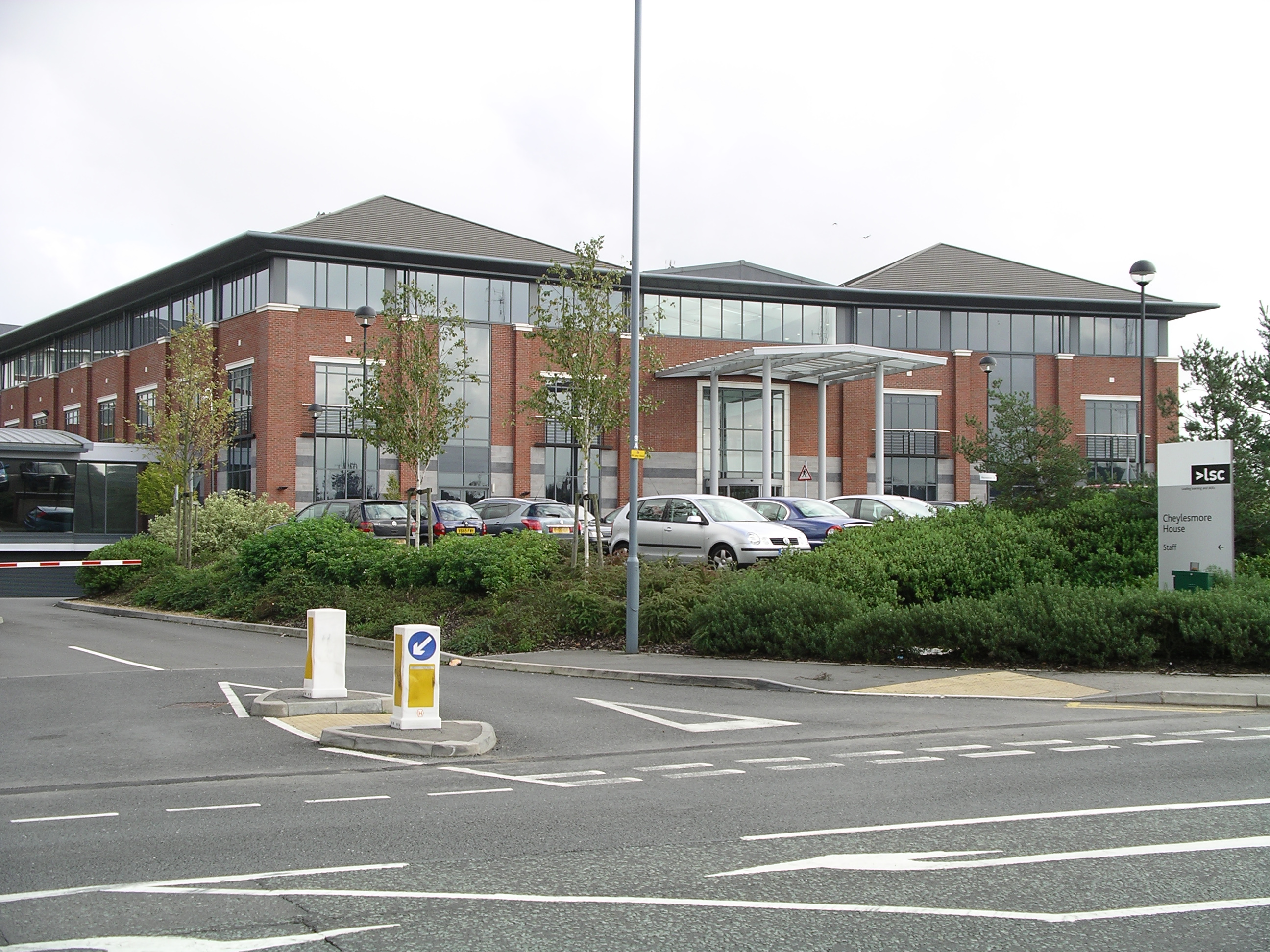
Cheylesmore House, Cheylesmore, Coventry

The Skills Funding Agency was one of two successor organisations that emerged from the closure in 2010 of the Learning and Skills Council (England's largest non-departmental public body or quango). The agency was in turn replaced by the Education and Skills Funding Agency in 2017.

The restructuring of the English skills system was announced by Prime Minister Gordon Brown shortly after he took office in 2007. The office of the chief executive of Skills Funding was established in law by the Apprenticeships, Skills, Children and Learning Act 2009. The office was originally a corporation sole, and employees were appointed by the chief executive as Crown servants, collectively referred to as the Skills Funding Agency (SFA). The chief executive was appointed by the Secretary of State for Business, Innovation and Skills. Further legislation was passed in 2012, with the agency becoming an executive agency of the Department for Business, Innovation and Skills.

The agency funded skills training for further education (FE) in England. Its scope included apprenticeships and adult education; it also implemented initiatives funded by the European Social Fund. The agency supported over 1,000 colleges, private training organisations, and employers with more than £4 billion of funding each year.

The SFA's mission was to ensure that people and businesses could access the skills training they needed to succeed in playing their part in society and in growing England’s economy. This was done in the context of policy set by government and informed by the needs of businesses, communities and regions, and sector and industry bodies.

The SFA employed around 925 staff at its head office in Coventry and in offices around England. It ran the National Apprenticeship Service and the National Careers Service.

In January 2012, Chief Executive Geoff Russell announced his resignation, and on 30 May 2012, it was announced by Skills Minister, John Hayes that Kim Thorneywork had been appointed as interim chief executive. In November 2014, Peter Lauener was appointed as chief executive.

Following machinery of Government changes, the Skills Funding Agency became an executive agency of the Department for Education in 2016.

The Skills Funding Agency was abolished on 31 March 2017. Its former functions, together with those of the former Education Funding Agency, were transferred to the Education and Skills Funding Agency, created on 1 April 2017.

== See also ==
- Higher Education Funding Council for England (1992–2018)
- Office for Students
