= Youth Training Scheme =

United Kingdom on-the-job training scheme

The Youth Training Scheme (YTS) was the name in the United Kingdom of an on-the-job training course for school leavers aged 16 and 17 and was managed by the Manpower Services Commission. The scheme was first outlined in the 1980 white paper A New Training Initiative: A Programme for Action, and it was brought into operation in 1983 to replace the Youth Opportunities Programme by the government of Margaret Thatcher. Initially lasting one year or six months, the scheme was amended in 1986 to be so that it could be extended to two years.

The 1981 England riots encouraged that, by bringing into sharp focus the results of large numbers of unskilled unemployed finding their own solutions. The scheme promised training to its applicants and made use of a variety of different training locales such as businesses, colleges of further education or training workshops run by voluntary organisations. Since the training place was guaranteed by the government and trainees were to be paid if they were on the course, eligibility for unemployment benefit was withdrawn.

Accredited organisations were required to provide at least 13 weeks per year of training away from the job and include life skills and social skills. A standardised form of certification was issued at the end of the training period.

In 1989, it was renamed Youth Training and was placed under the management of local training and enterprise councils. The trainees on the schemes could be classified as either trainee status or employed status.

The difference was distinguished by whether the trainee was recruited by an employer and provided with training for the company needs or if the trainee was being trained by a training organisation using employers as training placements. Often, employed status trainees would have their training allowance improved by the employer.

== Criticism ==
The YTS attracted political and social criticism from an early point. Critics claimed that the scheme enabled employers to exploit school leavers for cheap labour, and it provided little substance in the way of genuine education. The broad left alliance of musicians, artists, comedians and writers, Red Wedge, criticised YTS for its discriminatory nature toward black people and women. The government's line was that the scheme was an effective counter to the drop in apprenticeships and marked rise in youth unemployment that was seen in the early 1980s.

In 1985, schoolchildren across the country went on strike against the YTS, with protests in London and Liverpool.
