= Executive agency =

Part of a UK government department

An executive agency is, in the United Kingdom, a part of an executive government portfolio that is managerially and financially separate from the core department and carries out certain of the executive functions of that department. Each of the United Kingdom government, Scottish Government, Welsh Government or Northern Ireland Executive use executive agencies in particular policy areas. Executive agencies are "machinery of government" devices distinct both from non-ministerial government departments and non-departmental public bodies (or "quangos"), each of which enjoy legal and constitutional separation from ministerial control. The model has been applied in several other countries.

== Size and scope ==
Agencies include well-known organisations such as His Majesty's Prison Service and the Driver and Vehicle Licensing Agency. The annual budget for each agency, allocated by HM Treasury, ranges from a few million pounds for the smallest agencies to £700m for the Court Service. Almost all government departments have at least one agency.

== Issues and reports ==
The initial success or otherwise of executive agencies was examined in the Sir Angus Fraser's Fraser Report of 1991. Its main goal was to identify what good practices had emerged from the new model and spread them to other agencies and departments. The report also recommended further powers be devolved from ministers to chief executives.

A series of reports and white papers examining governmental delivery were published throughout the 1990s, under both Conservative and Labour governments. During these the agency model became the standard model for delivering public services in the United Kingdom. By 1997, 76% of civil servants were employed by an agency. The new Labour government in its first such report – the 1998 Next Steps Report – endorsed the model introduced by its predecessor. A later review (in 2002, linked below) made two central conclusions (their emphasis):

"The agency model has been a success. Since 1988 agencies have transformed the landscape of government and the responsive and effectiveness of services delivered by Government."

Some agencies have, however, become disconnected from their departments ... The gulf between policy and delivery is considered by most to have widened."

The latter point is usually made more forcefully by critics of the government, describing agencies as "unaccountable quangos".

== List by department ==
=== Cabinet Office ===
- Government Commercial Agency
- Government Property Agency

=== Department for Business and Trade ===
- Companies House
- Fair Work Agency
- Insolvency Service

=== Department for Education ===
- Standards and Testing Agency
- Teaching Regulation Agency

=== Department for Environment, Food and Rural Affairs ===
- Animal and Plant Health Agency
- Centre for Environment, Fisheries and Aquaculture Science
- Rural Payments Agency
- Veterinary Medicines Directorate

=== Department for Science, Innovation and Technology ===
- Intellectual Property Office
- Met Office

=== Department for Transport ===
- Active Travel England
- Driver and Vehicle Licensing Agency
- Driver and Vehicle Standards Agency
- Maritime and Coastguard Agency
- Vehicle Certification Agency

=== Department for Work and Pensions ===
- Skills England

=== Department of Health and Social Care ===
- Medicines and Healthcare products Regulatory Agency
- UK Health Security Agency

=== Foreign, Commonwealth and Development Office ===
- Wilton Park

=== HM Treasury ===
- Government Internal Audit Agency
- UK Debt Management Office

=== Ministry of Defence ===
- Defence Equipment and Support
- Defence Science and Technology Laboratory
- Submarine Delivery Agency
- UK Hydrographic Office

=== Ministry of Housing, Communities and Local Government ===
- Planning Inspectorate
- Queen Elizabeth II Conference Centre

=== Ministry of Justice ===
- Criminal Injuries Compensation Authority
- HM Courts and Tribunals Service
- HM Prison and Probation Service
- Legal Aid Agency
- Office of the Public Guardian

== Other countries ==
Several other countries have an executive agency model.

In the United States, the Clinton administration imported the model under the name "performance-based organizations."

In Canada, executive agencies were adopted on a limited basis under the name special operating agencies. One example is the Translation Bureau under Public Services and Procurement Canada.

Executive agencies were also established in Australia, Jamaica, Japan and Tanzania.

== See also ==
- Trading fund
- Agency of the European Union
- Government-owned corporation
- Departments of the United Kingdom Government
- Non-departmental public body
- Independent agencies of the United States government
- United States federal executive departments
