= Education and Skills Funding Agency =

Executive agency in the United Kingdom

Executive Agency overview
- Formed: 1 April 2017
- Preceding Executive Agency: Education Funding Agency and Skills Funding Agency
- Dissolved: 31 March 2025
- Jurisdiction: England
- Parent department: Department for Education
- Website: www.gov.uk/government/organisations/education-and-skills-funding-agency

The Education and Skills Funding Agency (ESFA) was an executive agency of the government of the United Kingdom, sponsored by the Department for Education. It existed from 2017 to 2025.

The ESFA was formed on 1 April 2017 following the merger of the Education Funding Agency (EFA) and the Skills Funding Agency (SFA). It brought together the existing responsibilities of the EFA and SFA, creating a single agency accountable for funding education, apprenticeships and training for children, young people and adults. Previously the EFA was responsible for distributing funding for state education in England for 3–19 year olds, as well as managing the estates of schools and colleges; and the SFA was responsible for funding skills training for further education in England and running the National Apprenticeship Service and the National Careers Service.

The EFA had been formed on 1 April 2012 by bringing together the functions of two previous non-departmental public bodies, the Young People's Learning Agency and Partnerships for Schools. From 2013, the EFA oversaw a schools capital building programme, appointing construction contractors under national and regional framework agreements to enable schools and other education bodies to select and appoint contractors. A report was issued in 2015 which highlighted that the EFA had discriminated against small and medium-sized enterprises (SMEs) when appointing to the framework agreements, contrary to UK government guidance promoting SME access to government procurement opportunities.

In the 2019–20 financial year, the ESFA was responsible for a budget of £59 billion and had approximately 1,500 staff. The budget had increased to £65 billion by 2022.

David Withey was the final Chief Executive; appointed in 2022.

On 11 September 2024, Education Secretary Bridget Phillipson announced the ESFA would close on 31 March 2025, with its functions integrated into the core Department for Education.

== See also ==
- Education in England
- Manpower Services Commission
- Skills England
