= Cheylesmore =

Suburb of Coventry, England

Coordinates: 52.393°N 1.505°W

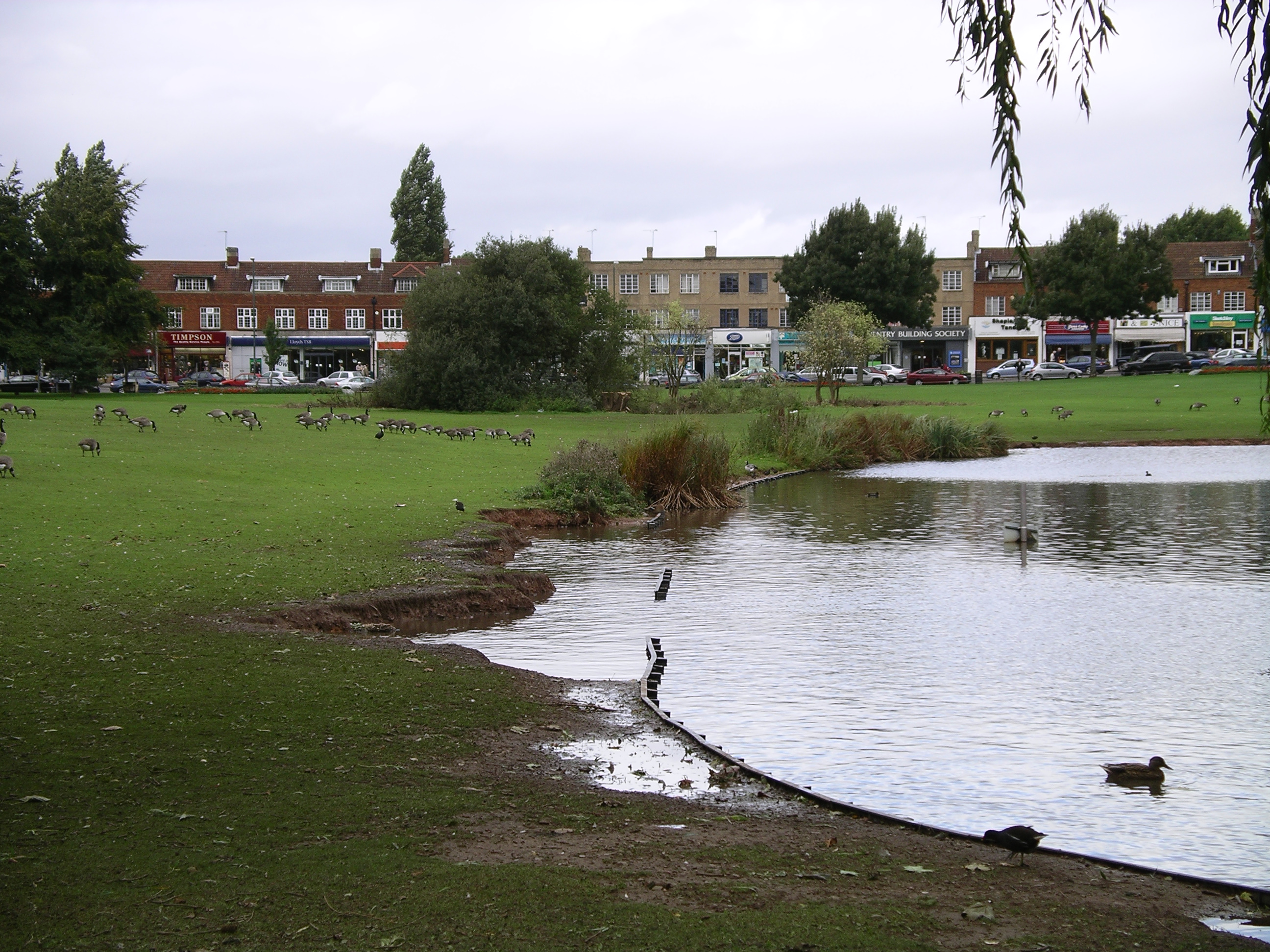
- Quinton Pool, Cheylesmore

- Location within the West Midlands
- Population: 15,860 (2011. Ward)
- OS grid reference: SP 337 773
- Metropolitan borough: Coventry
- Metropolitan county: West Midlands
- Region: West Midlands
- Country: England
- Sovereign state: United Kingdom
- Post town: Coventry
- Postcode district: CV3
- Police: West Midlands
- Fire: West Midlands
- Ambulance: West Midlands

Cheylesmore /ˈtʃaɪlzmɔː/ is a suburb in the southern half of the city of Coventry, West Midlands, England. It is one of Coventry's largest suburbs, sharing borders with Whitley and Stivichall (also spelt Styvechale) in the South, extending into Coventry city centre and bordering with Earlsdon in the North. Locally pronounced as 'Charlesmore' or occasionally 'Chellsmore', Cheylesmore has two shopping parades situated in Daventry Road and Quinton Park. These shops overlook a small park and pool known as Quinton Pool. It takes its name from Cheylesmore Manor. The original name probably derives from 'Chez Les Morts' since a huge plague pit was found during excavations after the Second World War. The city gate leading to the area was labelled as Childsmore Gate on old maps, an alternative etymology of the name.

== Industrial heritage and new developments ==
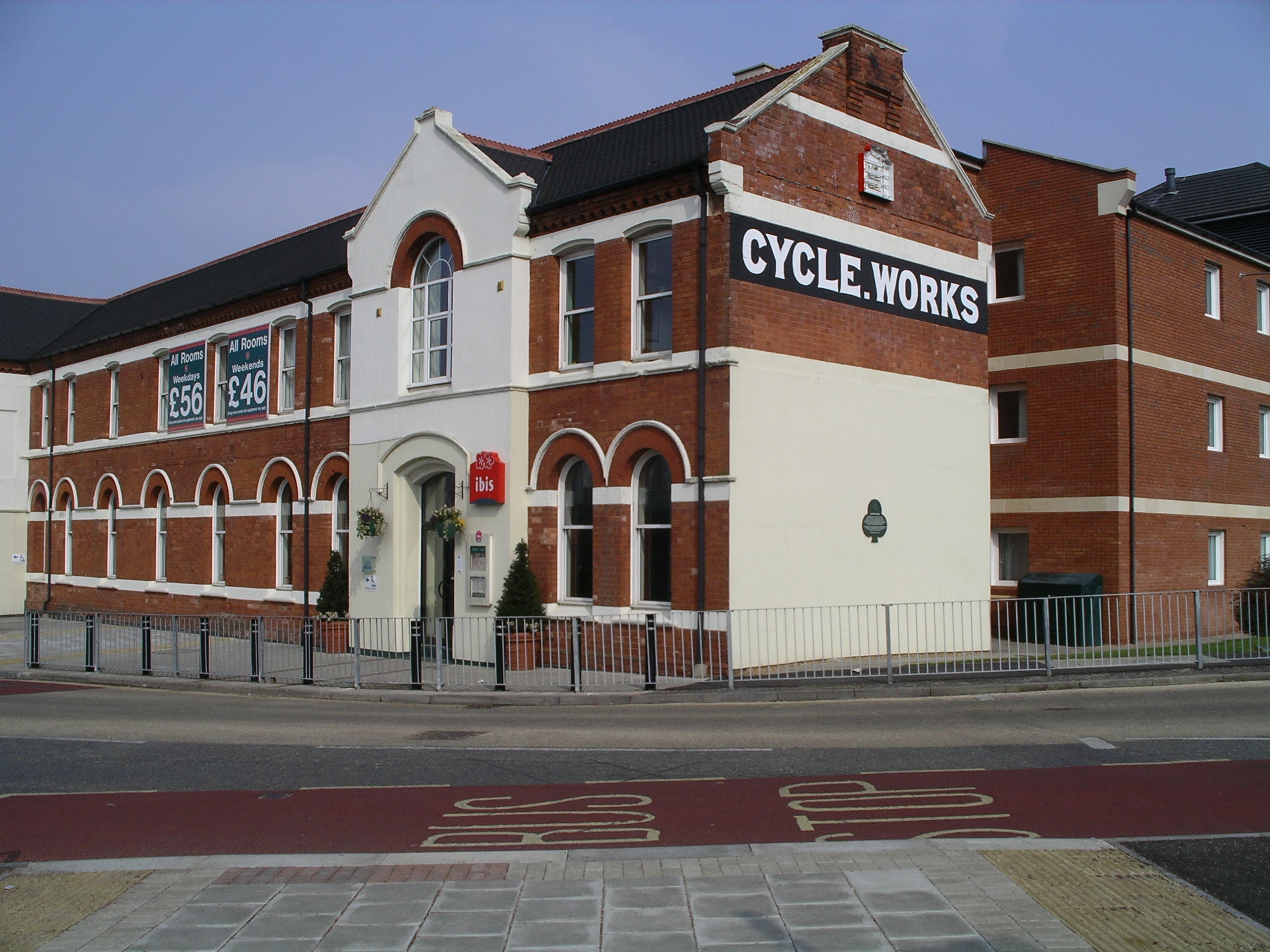
Ibis hotel and former Quinton Works

The Quinton Road and Mile Lane areas of Cheylesmore have been occupied by several companies that contributed to Coventry's motoring heritage, including Rolls-Royce, Armstrong Siddeley, Coventry Climax, and the Swift Motor Company. The suburb's proximity to large manufacturing firms resulted in a rapid expansion of the area during the 1930s with planners finding it difficult to get houses constructed in time to meet the demand for them. The advantage of the short distance between the factories and houses was that workers were able to walk to the factories, saving them the bus fare. They were also able to go home for a meal at midday before returning to work.

The former Quinton Works, originally built in 1890 as a cycle factory, situated at the junction of Mile Lane and Quinton Road was acquired by the Swift Motor Company in 1905. During World War I the factory contributed to the war-effort, producing munitions, military bicycles, Hispano-Suiza and Renault aircraft engines.

The frontage of the Quinton Works has been restored and integrated with a newly built Ibis Hotel, whilst most of the rest of the former site has been knocked down. New developments in this part of Cheylesmore include Cheylesmore House which is the national headquarters of the Skills Funding Agency and the Standards and Testing Agency; a technology park for Coventry University; and residential housing.

A new set of houses was built in 2007, on the new road Crediton Close. It looks onto Howes Primary School. It is all part of new housing for Coventry.

== Demographics ==
According to the 2021 census, out of a population of 15,650, Cheylesmore's ethnic composition is as follows:

- White — 67.8%
- Asian — 22.7%
- Black — 4.5%
- Arab — 0.4%
- Mixed — 3.1%
- Other ethnicity — 1.9%

== Cheylesmore Manor House ==
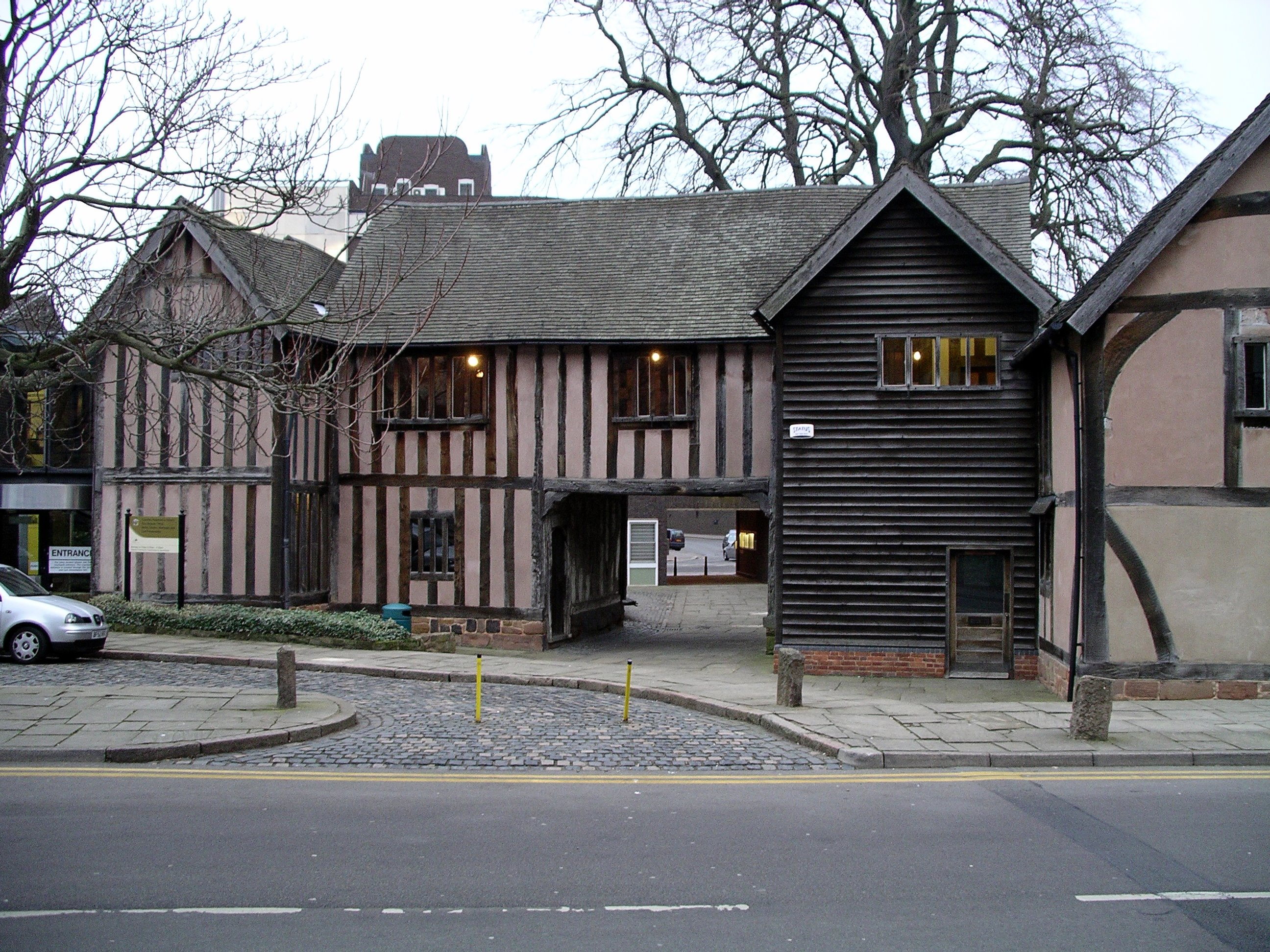
Cheylesmore Manor Gatehouse(front view)

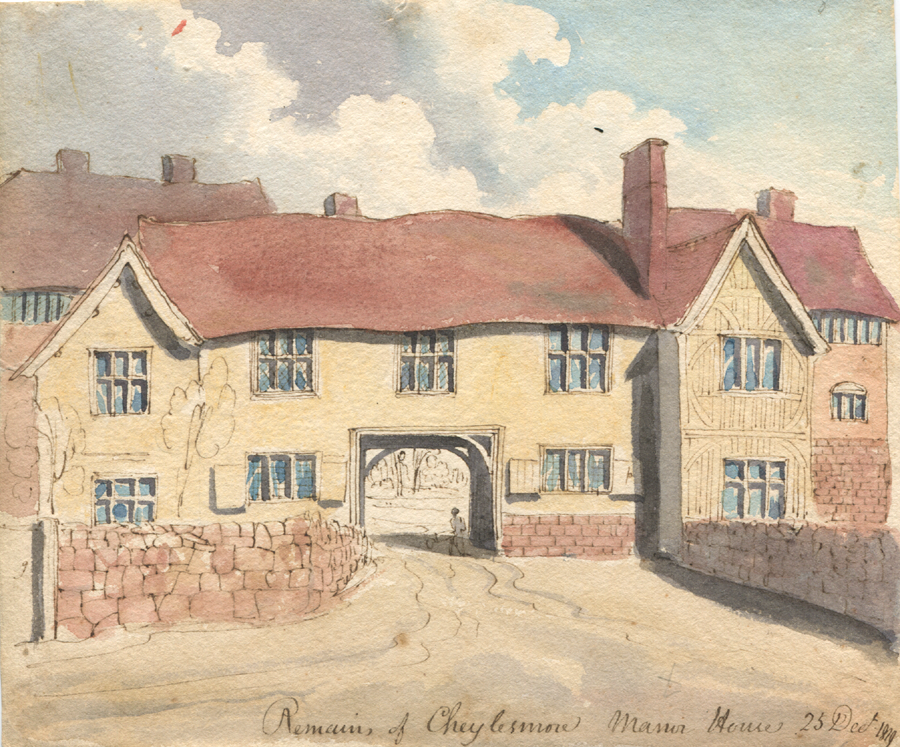
The manor house in 1820, as painted by William Henry Brooke.

Cheylesmore Manor Gatehouse is a grade II* listed building and the home of Coventry's Register office since 1965. Parts of the building date back to the 13th century (c.1250). Edward, the Black Prince, and Henry VI were among those who lived at the Manor House. Remnants of the house survived the Second World War, but were demolished in 1955 as part of the post war development of the town. Edward used Cheylesmore Manor as his hunting lodge and reputedly visited the area frequently. His grandmother Queen Isabella, the "she-wolf" of France and the Queen of Edward II, gained the manorial rights when the Crown had acquired them from previous owners.

The seal of the city bears the motto "Camera Principis" or the Prince's chamber which, it is said, it owes to the close tie with the Black Prince. Also the "cat-a-mountain" of the Black Prince surmounts the coat of arms as a crest.

== Hunting park ==
Cheylesmore land extended well to the south beyond the Manor house, and provided a hunting park to its owner.

In the 16th century, Edward VI granted the manor and park to John Dudley, Earl of Warwick, who as Duke of Northumberland leased it to Coventry Corporation on the condition that 80 cows and 20 geldings belonging to the poor were pastured there. In 1819 the royal connection to Coventry Park, Cheylesmore park finally ended when the Prince of Wales sold the estate to the Marquis of Hertford. He enclosed the parkland and began building houses for estate workers. In 1871 the estate was purchased by Henry Eaton, M.P. for Coventry. He donated land there for a vicarage for the Parish Church of St. Michael, and for a new approach road for the railway station.

The development of Cheylesmore began in the early 20th century with the building of factories and housing in the Parkside area, close to the city, and continued outwards towards Quinton Park from the late 1920s. Quinton Pool and its surrounding green open space is now the area's only reminder of the former royal hunting park.

Manor Park Primary School, located in Cheylesmore, takes its name from the Manor house and park. The school was built as a showcase, the first built in Coventry since the end of the war. The crest of the school features a falcon hunting bird, a reference to the Cheylesmore hunting park.

== The Charter House ==
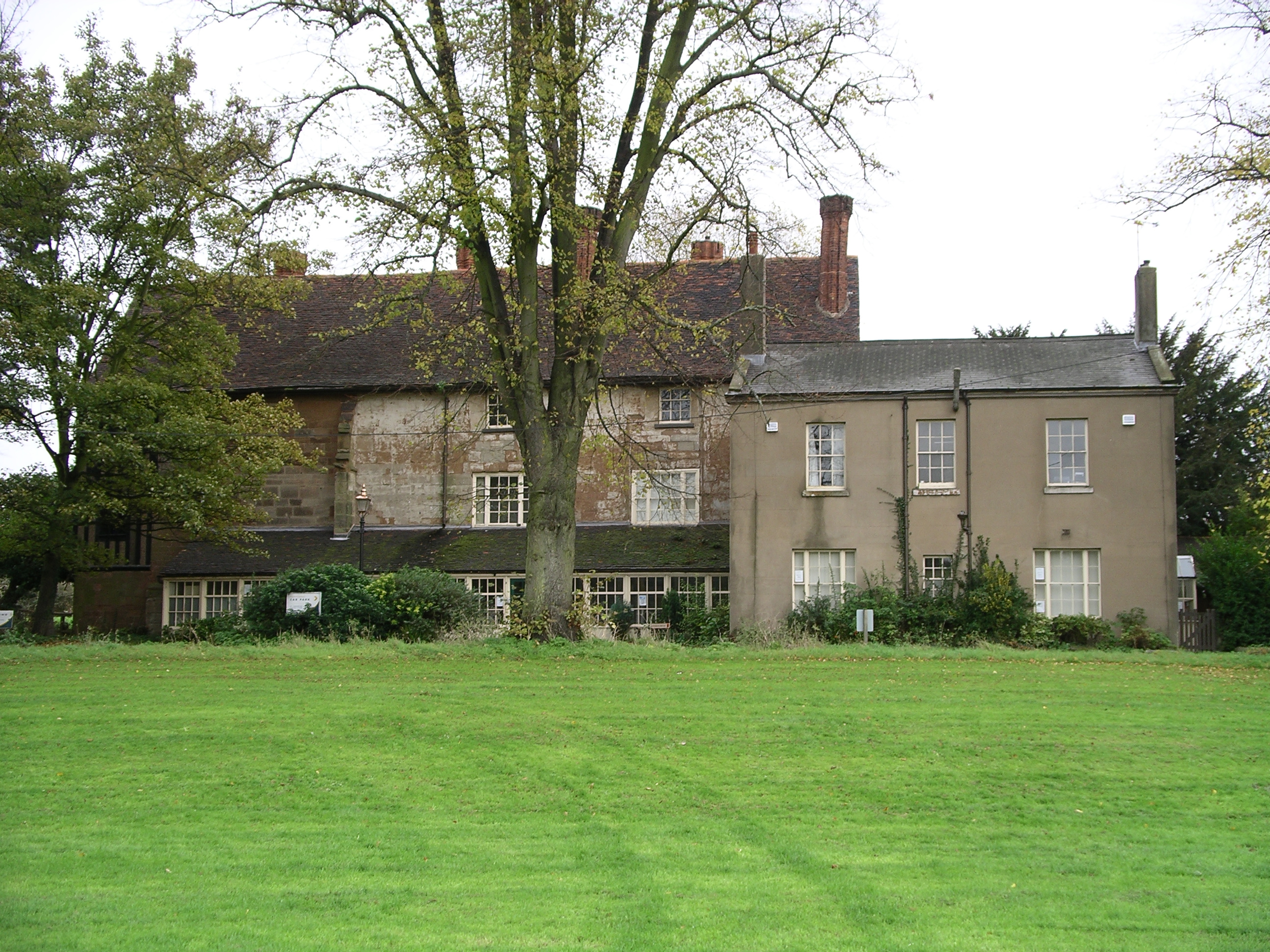
The Charter House, Cheylesmore

The Charter house was founded in 1381-2 as part of a Carthusian monastery by King Richard II. There were 11 cells for the monks arranged round a Great Cloister, (as usual for this Order). There was also room for the lay brothers, servants and 12 schoolboys. After the dissolution of the monastery in 1539, the majority of the buildings were demolished, leaving only the stone and timber-framed building still standing and two low wings on the west side which were demolished in 1848. It became a private house until 1940 after which it has been used as an old people's home and an Arts Center. The main surviving building is a 15th-century sandstone range which probably contained the Prior's guest-house. Some original stone corbels and wooden carved tie beams remain, as does a moulded stone fireplace and a magnificent medieval wall painting depicting the crucifixion. The timber-framed addition is of 16th century date. Internally the building was substantially altered in the 16th century when it became a private house. An extra floor was inserted in the northern part and the medieval painting covered by paneling, which is itself finely painted. Sash windows and Georgian doors were inserted in the 18th century and the existing brick house on the south-west corner in the 19th century. The building is now listed of Grade I Architectural and Historic Interest by the Department of the Environment.
