= National Careers Service =

Publicly funded careers service for adults and young people in England

Agency overview
- Formed: 2012; 14 years ago
- Preceding agencies: Next Step; Connexions Direct
- Jurisdiction: England
- Parent department: Department for Education
- Website: nationalcareers.service.gov.uk

The National Careers Service is the English publicly-funded careers service founded in April 2012 for persons aged 13 and over.

== History ==
The National Careers Service was established on the April 5, 2012, replacing Next Step and Connexions Direct.

At launch, the Government aimed for the National Careers Service to have the capacity to help 700,000 adults face-to-face each year, to handle up to one million telephone advice sessions and provide 20 million online sessions.

In July 2024, the Department for Work and Pensions (DWP) announced plans to merge the National Careers Service with Jobcentre Plus. As careers advice is a devolved function, the merger may not be implemented in Scotland, Wales or Northern Ireland. In November 2025, the Work and Pensions Select Committee reported that there were fears that the merger could eliminate the distinction between work coaches and careers advisors, reducing the effectiveness of the service. The DWP intends to end the outsourcing of the National Careers Service and bring its staff in-house once the existing contracts expire at the end of September 2026.

== Services ==
The service focuses on supporting six priority groups to get into work, including:

- Young people aged 18–24 who are not in education, employment or training
- Those unemployed for more than 12 months
- Low-skilled adults
- Single parents
- Unemployed adults over 50
- Adults with special educational needs or who have a disability.

As well as phone appointments with career advisors, its assistance also includes:

1. Skills assessments
2. Career profiles
3. Locating training courses
4. CV and interview advice
5. Disability support

== Availability ==
It is available online, over the phone, by email, and by post. The service is available throughout England, with devolved responsibility for careers advice in Scotland, Wales and Northern Ireland.

Publicly funded careers services for Northern Ireland, Scotland and Wales are provided by Careers Service Northern Ireland, Skills Development Scotland and Careers Wales respectively. There is also a dedicated careers service for the Isle of Man.

== Matrix standard ==
From March 2013, all local centres and the contact centre providers must undergo a matrix Standard assessment, with all providers meeting the enhanced matrix Standard. The matrix Standard is an independent quality standard for information, advice and guidance services.

To achieve accreditation, organisations must undergo inspection and show that they meet requirements around leadership and management, resources, service delivery and continuous quality improvement.
