= Learning and Skills Act 2000 =

Act of the Parliament of the United Kingdom

Learning and Skills Act 2000 (Note: Section 156.)
- Act of Parliament
- Parliament of the United Kingdom
- Long title: An Act to establish the Learning and Skills Council for England and the National Council for Education and Training for Wales, to make other provision about education and training, and for connected purposes.
- Citation: 2000 c. 21
- Territorial extent: England and Wales; Scotland (in part); Northern Ireland (in part); (Note: Section 155.)

Dates
- Royal assent: 28 July 2000
- Commencement: Various (Note: Section 154.)
Other legislation
Amended by	Government of Wales Act 2006; National Health Service (Consequential Provisions) Act 2006; Charities Act 2011

Status: Amended

Text of statute as originally enacted

Revised text of statute as amended

The Learning and Skills Act 2000 (c. 21) is an act of the Parliament of the United Kingdom, introduced under the first Tony Blair government. It made changes in the funding and administration of further education, and of work-based learning (or apprenticeships) for young people, within England and Wales.

== Provisions ==
The main changes were:

- Establishment of the Learning and Skills Council (LSC) to secure the provision of education and training for young people and adults, in England, and to encourage employers and individuals to participate, and the LSC's funding powers.
- Provisions for the appointment of governors in the further education sector.
- Other duties and powers of the LSC, including equal opportunities and the needs of people with learning difficulties, powers to provide information, advice and guidance services and a duty to publish its strategy and annual plans.
- Establishment of local LSCs, including planning and consultation arrangements and the power of the Secretary of State to make directions to local education authorities in respect of adult and community learning provision.
- Creation of the LSC's Young People's and Adult Learning Committees.
- Creation of academies (originally known as "city academies"), publicly funded schools operating outside of local government control and with a significant degree of autonomy.
- Powers for the Secretary of State to give directions to the LSC, to pay it its annual grant-in-aid and require the LSC to make an annual report.
- Publication of guidelines for sex education
- Similar arrangements for Wales, creating an organisation known as Education and Learning Wales.

The Act also established arrangements for Inspections of further education in England and Wales, and abolished the Further Education Funding Council for England.

== Reception ==
The Conservative Party criticised the legislation for creating "quangos" and reducing local flexibility. The Liberal Democrats criticised the legislation for not being democratic due to the fact it did not give statutory representation to local authorities or local education authorities on the national Learning and Skills Council and local learning and skills councils.
