= National Apprenticeship Service =

- Abbreviation: NAS
- Predecessor: Learning and Skills Council
- Formation: 27 April 2009; 17 years ago
- Type: Government agency
- Purpose: Apprenticeships in England
- Region served: England
- Executive Director: David Way
- Parent organization: Education and Skills Funding Agency
- Website: Apprenticeships

The National Apprenticeship Service (NAS), part of the Education and Skills Funding Agency, is a government agency that coordinates apprenticeships in England, enabling young people to enter the skilled trades.

== History ==
At the beginning of February 2008 the Labour Government published a document called Strategy for the Future of Apprenticeships in England. It introduced a quango, the National Apprenticeship Service (NAS). The National Skills Director of the Learning and Skills Council (LSC) was to be in charge of the NAS. The LSC at the time had had most of its funding farmed out to local authorities. The NAS was to be part of the LSC, as outlined in the government's 2008 document on apprenticeships. Two new divisions in the LSC were formed at the same time - one for young people headed by Rob Wye, and one for adult education and training headed by Chris Roberts. All of the three new divisions were still at this stage part of the LSC, and not separate entities. At the time six government agencies had some responsibility for apprenticeships, but there was no overall leadership.

At the time of its formation, the Labour Government up to that point had been heavily focused on persuading 50% of under-18s to attend university. In other European countries, much more focus is placed on apprenticeships; only 6% of English companies offer apprenticeships compared to 30% in Germany. In England, those who by age of 25 had been on an apprenticeship are likely to earn much more than those who do not, for similar qualifications (£100,000 over a career). A university degree is often quoted as improving earning potential, but is highly dependent on choice of degree, and apprenticeships have a much higher success rate on earning potential.

== See also ==
- Apprenticeships in the United Kingdom
- T Level
