= David Melville (physicist) =

British physicist

Sir David Melville CBE FInstP

Vice-Chancellor of the University of Kent
- In office 2001–2007
- Preceded by: Robin Sibson
- Succeeded by: Dame Julia Goodfellow

Chief executive of the Further Education Funding Council for England
- In office 1996–2001
- Preceded by: Sir William Stubbs
- Succeeded by: None (abolished)

Vice-Chancellor of Middlesex University
- In office 1991–1996
- Succeeded by: Michael Driscoll

Personal details
- Born: 4 April 1944 (age 82)
- Citizenship: United Kingdom
- Spouse: Hilary
- Education: Clitheroe Royal Grammar School
- Alma mater: University of Sheffield; Columbia University

Sir David Melville, CBE, FInstP (born 4 April 1944) is a British physicist, academic, academic administrator, and public servant. He was Vice-Chancellor of Middlesex University from 1991 to 1996, Chief executive of the Further Education Funding Council for England from 1996 to 2001, and Vice-Chancellor of the University of Kent from 2001 to 2007.

== Early life and education ==
Melville was born on 4 April 1944 in Gateshead, Durham, England. He was educated at Clitheroe Royal Grammar School, then an all-boys grammar school in Clitheroe, Lancashire. He studied physics at the University of Sheffield, graduating with a Bachelor of Science (BSc) degree in 1965; he was the first of his family to attend university. Having been awarded a NASA scholarship, he studied for a year at Columbia University in New York City, United States, and graduated with a graduate diploma in space physics. During that year he worked on the Apollo programme of human spaceflight and the preparation of the Apollo 11 Moon landing. He then returned to the University of Sheffield to undertake postgraduate research in physics. He completed his Doctor of Philosophy (PhD) degree in 1970.

== Career ==
From 1968 to 1984, Melville was a lecturer and then senior lecturer in physics at the University of Southampton. He then moved to Lancashire Polytechnic where he had been appointed Professor of Physics and head of its School of Physics and Astronomy. From 1986 to 1991, he served as assistant director and then vice-rector of the polytechnic.

In 1991, Melville moved to Middlesex Polytechnic having been appointed its director. He then oversaw its transition from a polytechnic to a university, and he became the first vice-chancellor of Middlesex University in 1992. During his time in charge, it expanded from 9,000 to 20,000 students.

In 1996, Melville was appointed chief executive of the Further Education Funding Council for England (FEFC) in succession to Sir William Stubbs. As such, he was in charge of the £3 billion yearly budget for further education and sixth form colleges in England. The FEFC was merged with the training and enterprise councils to form the Learning and Skills Council in 2001.

In 2001, with the closure of the FEFC, Melville returned to higher education as vice-chancellor of the University of Kent. Over his six-year tenure at Kent, he oversaw the growth of the student population from 11,000 to 16,000 students. during this time he also served on a number of external bodies: he was chair of the Higher Education Statistics Agency from 2003 to 2007, chair of the University Vocational Awards Council, chair of the Kent and Medway Learning and Skills Council from 2006 to 2008, and chair of Lifelong Learning UK from 2006 to 2010. He left Kent in 2007.

== Honours ==
In the 2001 New Year Honours, Melville was appointed a Commander of the Order of the British Empire (CBE) "for services to Education". In the 2007 Queen's Birthday Honours, he was appointed a Knight Bachelor "for services to Further and Higher Education", and was therefore granted the title sir.

In 1978, Melville was elected a Fellow of the Institute of Physics (FInstP).

In 1997, Melville was awarded an honorary Doctor of Science (Hon DSc) degree by the University of Sheffield. In 2000, he was awarded an honorary Doctor of the University (Hon DUniv) degree by the University of Derby. In July 2008, he was awarded an honorary Doctor of Civil Law (Hon DCL) degree by the University of Kent.

== Personal life ==
Melville is married to Hilary.
