= Middlesex University =

Public university in London, England

Middlesex University London
- Type: Public research university
- Established: 1878–1973 as founding institutions 1973–1974 as Middlesex Polytechnic; 1992; 34 years ago gained university status
- Academic affiliations: ACU; EUA; University Alliance; Universities UK
- Endowment: £0.577 million (2022)
- Budget: £178.2 million (2021–22)
- Chancellor: Janet Ritterman (appointed 2013)
- Vice-Chancellor: Shân Wareing (appointed 2024)
- Administrative staff: 1,900
- Students: 15,020 (2024/25)
- Undergraduates: 10,465 (2024/25)
- Postgraduates: 4,555 (2024/25)
- Location: Hendon, London, United Kingdom
- Campus: London, Dubai, Mauritius
- Colours: White, red, black and grey
- Website: mdx.ac.uk

Middlesex University, branded as Middlesex University London (MDX), is a public research university based in Hendon, northwest London, England. The university also has campuses in Dubai and Mauritius. The university was in the historic county of Middlesex.

The university's history can be traced to 1878 when its founding institute, St Katharine's College, was established in Tottenham as a teacher training college for women. Having merged with several other institutes, the university was consolidated in its current form in 1992. It is one of the post-1992 universities (former polytechnics).

Middlesex has a student body of over 19,000 in London and over 37,000 globally. The university has student exchange links with over 100 universities in 22 countries across Europe, the United States, and the world. More than 140 nationalities are represented at Middlesex's Hendon campus alone. Additionally, it has campuses in Dubai and Mauritius as well as a number of local offices across the globe. Courses are delivered by the Faculty of Science and Technology, Faculty of Professional and Social Sciences, and the Faculty of the Arts and Creative Industries.

In 2023, it was awarded an overall rating of Silver by the Government's Teaching Excellence Framework. The university has been awarded the Queen's Anniversary Prize three times and has twice received Queen's Award for Enterprise for its international work.

== History ==
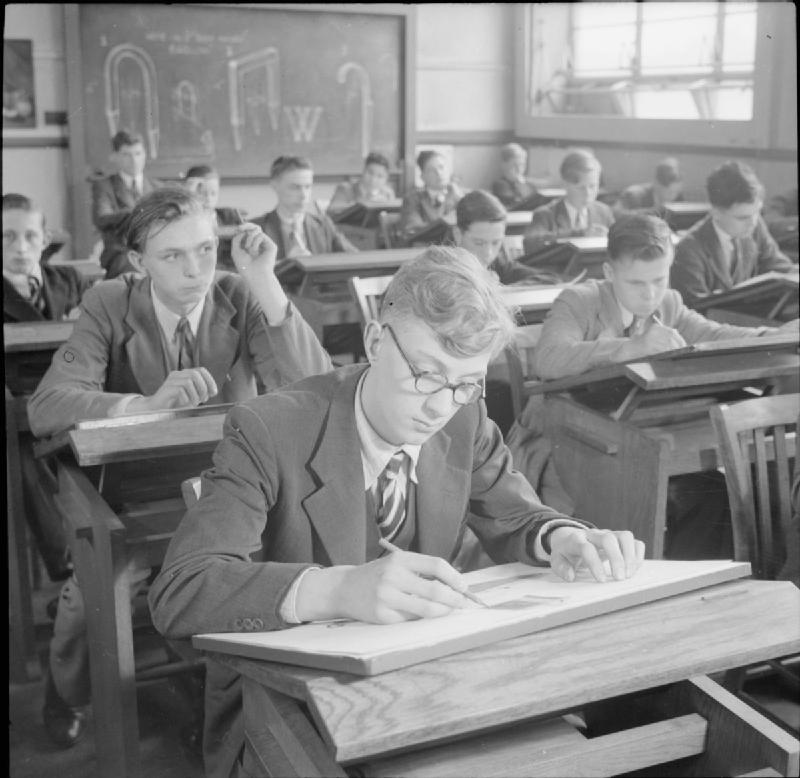
Students learning technical drawing at Tottenham Polytechnic in 1944

For 140 years, the institutions which eventually formed Middlesex University have been based in north London. The university grew out of mergers between different schools and colleges in the area beginning in 1878 when St. Katherine's College, a female teacher training college, was created in Tottenham. It was joined by Hornsey College of Art, founded in 1882, Ponders End Technical Institute, founded in 1901, and Hendon Technical Institute, opened in 1939.

In 1973, these colleges and further institutions around north London formed Middlesex Polytechnic. In 1992 Middlesex University was established from Middlesex Polytechnic by royal assent as part of the Further and Higher Education Act. More institutions joined at this time as Middlesex expanded further.

From the 1990s, the university began to develop its international presence with their first overseas regional office in Kuala Lumpur. In 1995, a network of regional offices opened across Europe. In 2005, Middlesex opened its first overseas campus in Dubai followed by a campuses in Mauritius in 2009 and Malta in 2013. The university also has partnerships with other educational institutions around the world.

The university has now consolidated its many London campuses into one Hendon campus where it now accommodates all its London-based teaching.

Timeline

- 1878 – St Katherine's College, Tottenham founded
- 1882 – Hornsey College of Art founded
- 1893 – Berridge House, Hampstead founded
- 1901 – Ponders End Technical Institute begins
- 1939 – Hendon Technical Institute opens
- 1947 – Trent Park College of Education opens
- 1962 – New College of Speech and Drama opens
- 1962 – Ponders End Technical Institute is renamed Enfield College of Technology by the Ministry of Education.
- 1964 – St Katherine's College unites with Berridge House to form The College of All Saints
- 1973 – Middlesex Polytechnic formed
- 1974 – Trent Park College of Education and New College of Speech and Drama join Middlesex Polytechnic
- 1978 – The College of All Saints closes, with the buildings (and remaining students and some staff) transferred to Middlesex Polytechnic
- 1991 – David Melville becomes the first Vice-Chancellor
- 1992 – Middlesex University formed; Baroness Platt of Writtle becomes the first Chancellor of the university; First overseas regional office opens in Kuala Lumpur
- 1994 – The London College of Dance becomes part of the university
- 1995 – North London College of Health becomes part of the university; Regional offices open in Europe
- 1996 – Michael Driscoll becomes the Vice-Chancellor; Middlesex receives its first Queen's Anniversary Prize for Higher and Further Education
- 1998 – Whittington Hospital (Archway Wing) is jointly purchased with University College London (UCL) from National Health Service (NHS); Queen's Anniversary Prize awarded for the second time;
- 1999 – Middlesex achieves Investors in People status
- 2000 – Lord Sheppard of Didgemere becomes Chancellor; Museum of Domestic Design and Architecture on the Cat Hill campus opens to the public; Middlesex awarded third Queen's Anniversary Prize; Hendon campus redevelopment begins
- 2003 – Rebranding initiated in 2001 is completed with the approval of new university logo; Bounds Green campus closes; Queen's Award for Enterprise received
- 2004 – London Sport Institute established within the School of Health and Social Sciences
- 2005 – First overseas campus opens in Dubai (UAE); Tottenham campus closes with most programmes transferred to Trent Park campus
- 2007 – Middlesex Media programmes awarded Skillset Media Academy status by the Government Department for Innovation, Universities and Skills
- 2008 – Enfield campus closes in summer – programmes, students and staff relocate to Hendon
- 2009 – Second overseas campus opens in Mauritius
- 2010 – Philosophy research centre and postgraduate programmes relocate to Kingston University after a decision to close taught programmes and subsequent campaign to save them
- 2011 – 2nd Queen's Award for Enterprise; to charge £9,000 a year in tuition fees – maximum under government legislation; Cat Hill closed, relocated to Trent Park and Hendon. 200 redundancies to make £10m of savings
- 2012 – Trent Park campus closed and programmes relocated to flagship campus in Hendon.
- 2013 – Closure of Archway campus and transfer of programmes to Hendon. All UK teaching at Hendon. Third international campus opens in Malta
- 2015 – Professor Tim Blackman becomes the Vice-Chancellor
- 2016 – Inauguration of the new hall of residence "Unite Olympic Way" at London Campus with 700 new rooms for Middlesex University students.
- 2016 – Inauguration of the new building "Forum North" (London Campus). "Forum North" houses Art & Design, Media & Performing Arts and Science & Technology facilities in an impressive eco-friendly building.
- 2017 – The £18 million Ritterman building is opened. It is home to the UK's first cyber factory
- 2018 – Middlesex University's Students' Union is awarded Students' Union of the Year

=== Restructuring ===
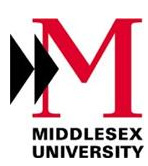
Middlesex's old logo

In May 2001 the university appointed C Eye, a branding consultancy, to design a new logo. In 2003, the previous "M" logo was replaced with a new red-coloured wavy line intended to express a flexible and responsive approach to the needs of students.

Following the review of the sustainability of its academic programmes, the university implemented a series of cuts over 2005–2006. In late 2005 it decided to stop offering history courses in an attempt to reduce a £10 million deficit. The decision was met with hostility from Middlesex's student union as well as from the National Union of Students. In other moves to save costs, the university made 175 voluntary redundancies, including 33 academic staff, a measure that was intended to save £5 million.

Since 2000, Middlesex has embarked on a strategy to achieve "fewer, better campuses" to reduce costs and improve its long-term sustainability. The strategy translated into the disposal of several small arts campuses in Bedford, Hampstead and Wood Green and the larger, but still uneconomic and unattractive campuses at Bounds Green, Enfield and Tottenham. The university also closed the Corporate Services building at the North London Business Park and consolidated most of the functions carried out on these sites at Hendon, where it aims to accommodate nearly all its London-based teaching.

In 2010, Middlesex announced the closure of its Philosophy department, because it was judged to be not financially sustainable. This was despite the fact that it had been the highest ranking department in the university's latest Research Assessment Exercise (RAE) in 2008, building on its grade of 5 in the 2001 Research Assessment Exercise. An international campaign of support was quickly organised, with figures such as Gayatri Chakravorty Spivak, Jean-Luc Nancy, Slavoj Žižek, Étienne Balibar, David Harvey, Isabelle Stengers expressing their strong disapproval. Articles condemning the decision appeared in the national press and students protested on campus and elsewhere for its restitution. In early June 2010 it was announced that the postgraduate component, the CRMEP, was to be transferred to Kingston University, but the undergraduate programme was still to be phased out.

== Campuses ==
The university has consolidated most of its activities onto the Hendon campus in London with all teaching located at Hendon from autumn 2013. All older campuses were closed – Bounds Green (2003), Tottenham (2005), Enfield (2008), Cat Hill (2011), Trent Park (2012), and Archway and Hospitals (2013) – while Hendon received substantial investment in facilities and infrastructure to accommodate new students and programmes.

Since 2004, the university has also been operating an overseas campus in Dubai and opened another one in Mauritius in October 2009. In September 2013, Middlesex opened its third international campus in Malta.

=== Current campuses ===
==== London: Hendon ====
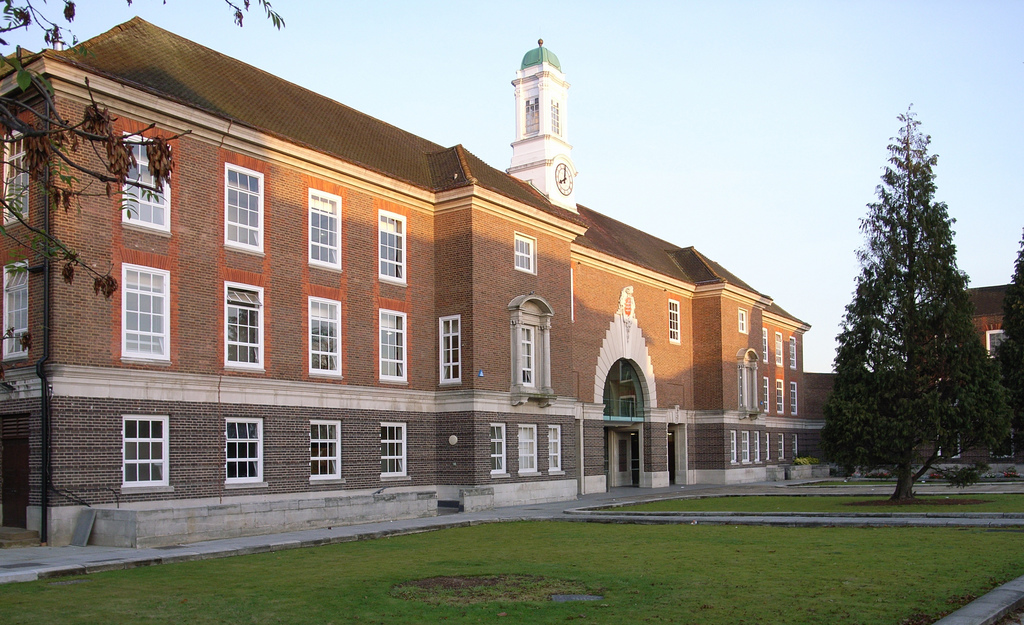
The College Building at Hendon

The Hendon campus is located in north-west London, near Hendon Central Underground station. Its main College Building was built in the neo-Georgian style by H.W. Burchett and opened in 1939 as part of Hendon Technical Institute. This was extended in 1955 and in 1969 when a new refectory and engineering block were added, and later expanded using a number of London Borough of Barnet office buildings including the current Town Hall and Library.

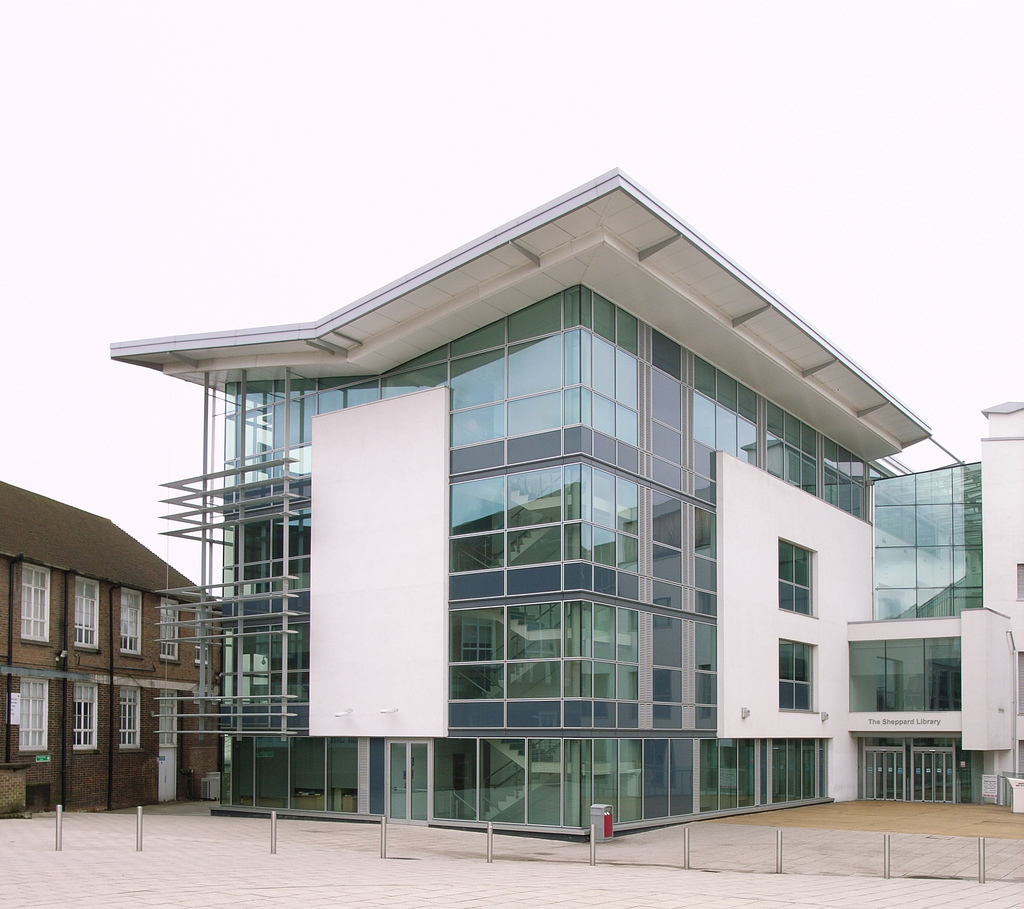
The Sheppard Library

Over £200m has been invested to transform the university's Hendon site into one of London's biggest campuses. The main College Building was refurbished in a £40 million project which included the addition of a glass-covered central courtyard forming Ricketts Quadrangle. In 2004, the new Learning Resource Centre, the Sheppard Library, opened to offer 24/7 access to over 1,000 study areas and specialist facilities including a Financial Markets Suite, Law Wing, and Teaching Resources Room.

The Ritterman Building is one of Middlesex University's newest developments, and was opened in February 2017. It provides over 3,300 square metres of additional teaching space for both the Faculty of Science and Technology, and the Faculty of Arts and Creative Industries, and is home to the UK's first 'Cyber Factory'. Its design incorporates sustainable technologies including solar panels, a bio-diverse green roof, and living walls irrigated by rainwater harvesting.

Other specialist facilities include bioscience and biomedical science laboratories, nursing and midwifery simulation labs.

The Hendon campus has a number of sports facilities, including a fitness studio, 7-a-side football pitches, floodlit outdoor courts (MACS), a bouldering wall, and one of the few real tennis courts in the UK. In October 2013, the university opened a new sports science facility at Allianz Park (the new stadium of Saracens Rugby Club) in Hendon. The refurbished university gym, Fitness Pod, opened in 2017 to offer gym and leisure facilities to students, staff and the local community.

==== Dubai ====
In 2005, the university opened a campus in the Dubai Knowledge Village as part of Dubai's Technology and Media Free Zone. This is a joint venture with Middlesex Associates, a business consortium in Dubai. The campus was the first Middlesex campus outside north London. It provides courses in Accounting and Finance, Business and Management, Computing and IT, Education, Law and Politics, Marketing, Media and Communications, Psychology, Social Science and International Tourism Management.

The campus is licensed by Dubai Knowledge and Human Authority (KHDA), and its programmes are approved by the KHDA. In August 2009, KHDA's University Quality Assurance International Board (UQAIB) commended the quality of university's programmes.

The Dubai campus had enrolled over 3,200 students, and houses a 100 diverse nationalities, as of 2020 and through the years.

In 2017, the university hosted the EU and UAE conference regarding the Rule of Law and Arbitration, where the Head of Delegation of the European Union to the United Arab Emirates, along with the legal director of Clyde & Co and the head of advocacy of Taylor Wessing were present.

In August 2019, the university was chosen to be a partner of the PRCA in the Middle East and North Africa region.

==== Mauritius ====
Located in Bonne Terre, a suburb of Vacoas-Phoenix, the 7,800 sq metre campus officially opened in 2010, the first British university to open in the country. It features a Learning Resource Centre, open access and computer suites, and dining and social spaces as well as on-site accommodation. Lecturing academics based at the Mauritius campus work in partnership with the academic programme team based at Middlesex's London campuses to ensure the quality standards of the UK programmes are maintained in curriculum delivery, teaching styles and assessment.

In October 2017, Middlesex opened its new campus at Cascavelle. The new campus has biodiversity and psychology labs and a student house for clubs and societies. Over 1,000 students, from 25 nationalities around the world, study both undergraduate and postgraduate courses at the campus.

=== Former campuses ===
==== Malta ====
In 2013, Middlesex opened its newest campus in Pembroke, Malta, on the island's northeast coast. The campus was shared with academic partner STC Training and offers a variety of business, science, and technology courses at undergraduate and postgraduate levels, including top-up and postgraduate courses in Computing, IT and business.

In February 2019, it was announced that the Malta campus would close by September 2022.

==== Archway and Hospitals ====
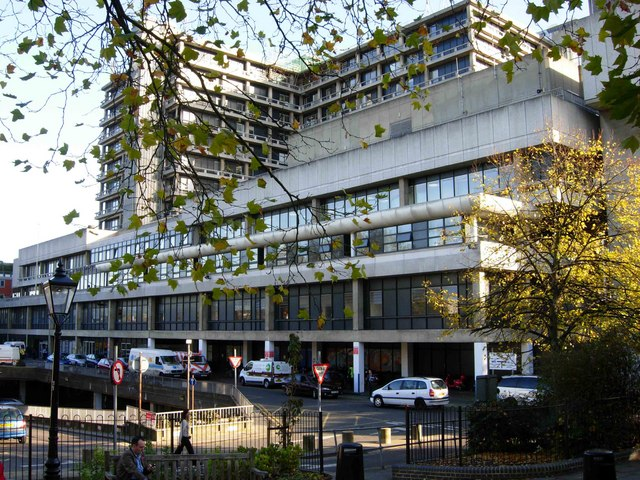
Royal Free Hospital, Hampstead

The campus was closed in 2013, to help provide students with better facilities than those allowed by the old building at the Archway Campus. Archway and Hospitals campus was primarily the domain of the School of Health and Social Sciences. It operated from four sites (hospitals): Royal Free Hospital, Whittington Hospital (Archway Wing) (jointly owned with UCL), Chase Farm and North Middlesex.

On 24 January 2007, the university inaugurated a new Centre for Excellence in Teaching and Learning (CETL) Mental Health and Social Work based at Archway campus. CETL status was bestowed on the Mental Health and Social Work Academic Group at the university in partnership with the Sainsbury Centre for Mental Health in 2005. Consequently, the centre was awarded a capital grant of £1.4 million along with an annual revenue of £350,000 for five years, representing one of the largest ever funding initiatives by the Higher Education Funding Council for England (HEFCE). This funding enabled the university to establish new teaching facilities at its Archway campus with the aim of creating an academic community of mental health and social work practitioners, students and faculty in one location.

Subject focuses: Nursing, midwifery, complementary health, sport science and social work.

==== Trent Park ====
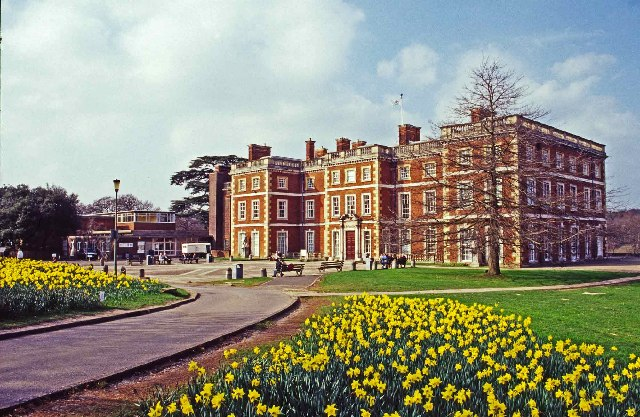
Mansion at Trent Park

Trent Park campus was closed in 2012 and all departments were moved to the main campus in Hendon. The campus was set within a 413-acre (1.67 km^{2}) country park, which was originally a 14th-century hunting ground of Henry IV. The focus of the campus was a palatial mansion, designed by Sir William Chambers in the 18th century. After the Second World War, the Ministry of Education used the house as an emergency teacher training centre, which became a residential teacher training college, called Trent Park College of Education in 1951. In 1974 the college was incorporated into Middlesex Polytechnic.

In 2012 around 16% of Middlesex students were based at Trent Park campus. The university's Summer School, which accounts for 0.2% of Middlesex students, also took place here. The university had ambitious plans to redevelop the site, but they were twice rejected by Enfield Council over environmental concerns.

The Trent Park site was purchased by a developer who received the necessary permits in October 2017 to build 262 residential units. The university campus buildings were removed prior to the development.

Subject focus: Dance, drama and performing arts, English language and literature, media, culture and communication, music, theatre arts, languages and translation studies, product design, Teaching and education. It was also home to the Flood Hazard Research Centre, which moved there when Enfield campus closed in July 2008. The Flood Hazard Research Centre is still part of Middlesex University but is now based at North London Business Park in New Southgate.

==== Tottenham ====
The campus was closed in summer 2005, its programmes of study having moved to the university's other campuses. What was the Tottenham campus started life as St Katharine's College, one of the first British teacher training colleges in 1878, later to become the College of All Saints, a Church of England college of higher education and a constituent college of the Institute of Education, University of London, whose degree courses it taught. The name change was a result of the 1964 union of St Katharine's with Berridge House, Hampstead, on the Tottenham site. The college expanded in the 1960s, although much of the campus retained its Victorian architecture. The college was highly regarded while part of the University of London, but its reputation suffered almost immediately once it was incorporated into Middlesex.

After the closure of the college and the union with Middlesex Polytechnic, the 'All Saints' campus was home to humanities and cultural studies, business studies, law, sociology and women's studies, all of which were later moved to other campuses. The buildings, previously occupied by the university, were demolished and the site is now the home of the Haringey Sixth Form College. The College of All Saints Foundation, dating from the 1964 union, continues as the All Saints Educational Trust.

==== Bounds Green ====
Bounds Green campus, home to the Engineering and Information Technology schools was sold to a residential developer in December 2003. It was used extensively for location shooting for the 1989 film, Wilt.

==== Enfield ====
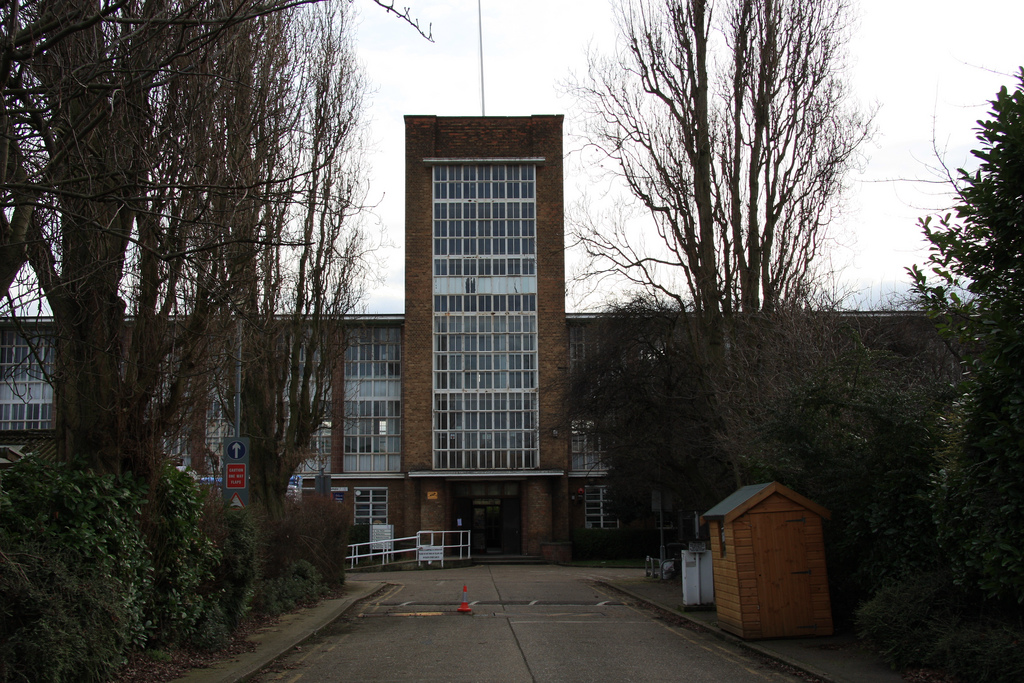
Broadbent building

The history of Enfield Campus began with the history of electric light. In 1901, Joseph Wilson Swan bought a house in Ponders End High Street that became the Ediswan Institute. Four years later Ediswan Institute was bought by Middlesex County Council and became the Ponders End Technical Institute. By 1937 The Ponders End Technical Institute was growing so rapidly that it was decided to build a new college across the road in Queensway. Due to the Second World War, it was not completed until 1953, but the unfinished buildings were in use throughout the war. By then it was called Enfield Technical College, but in 1962 it was renamed "Enfield College of Technology" by the Ministry of Education. In 1973 the college became part of Middlesex Polytechnic.

There are four major buildings on the campus: Broadbent, Roberts building (or Tower Block), McCrae and Pascal. They are named after people who helped to create it.

- Broadbent, the main building of Enfield Campus, is named after Henry Winterbottom Broadbent, a mechanical engineer who was appointed first Principal of Enfield Technical College in January 1941.
- Roberts tower block was named after a local industrialist George A. Roberts, who was chair of Enfield College's governing body from 1949 to 1968.
- McCrae building was the first extension to Enfield Technical College. Built in 1955, it was later named after Roderick McCrae, who was the Principal from 1955 to 1962.
- Pascal building is named after Eric Pascal who was Education Officer of the Borough of Enfield from before 1942 until 1945 or later, and clerk to the Governors of Enfield College from 1949 to 1965. The campus was closed in July 2008, and the majority of departments moved to the extended Hendon campus and some to the Archway Campus, shared with UCL.

==== Cat Hill ====
In March 2011, Cat Hill campus was sold to the L&Q housing association as part of the university's plans to centralise its courses in Hendon. The campus closed in September 2011 and students moved to a new £80 million 'Grove' building on the university's Hendon campus.

Cat Hill Campus was located in Cockfosters. It was originally the Hornsey College of Art, founded in 1880. In the late 1970s the campus was extended to become the Faculty of Art & Design of the then Middlesex Polytechnic.

==== Quicksilver Place ====
This housed the Fine Arts department from 1981 following the fire at Alexandra Palace which destroyed the former Hornsey College of Art Fine Arts Campus there. The site was closed at the end of the 2003 term after Haringey Council gave the university a notice to quit the site for redevelopment.

== Organisation and governance ==
=== Faculties ===
The university is divided into three faculties:

Faculty of Arts and Creative Industries

The Faculty of Arts and Creative Industries is home to the Departments of Media, Performing Arts, Design and Visual Arts.

Faculty of Professional and Social Sciences

The Faculty of Professional and Social Sciences groups subjects from the Business School, Institute for Work Based Learning, School of Law, and School of Health and Education.

Faculty of Science and Technology

The Faculty of Science and Technology brings together subjects including biomedical science, computer science, design engineering, telecommunications and computer engineering, mathematics and statistics, information systems and environmental science. The Faculty is home to the Departments of Natural Sciences, Computer Science, Design Engineering and Mathematics, Psychology, and the London Sports Institute.

=== Governance ===
Middlesex has both a Board of Governors and an Executive Team, both of which are led by the Vice-Chancellor, Tim Blackman.

Chancellors

- 1992–2000 – Beryl Platt, Baroness Platt of Writtle
- 2000–2013 – Allen Sheppard, Baron Sheppard of Didgemere
- 2013–present – Janet Ritterman

Vice-Chancellors

- 1972–1991 – Raymond Rickett (academic)
- 1992–1996 – David Melville
- 1992–2015 – Michael Driscoll
- 2015–2019 – Tim Blackman
- 2019–2023 – Nic Beech
- 2023–2024 – Sean Wellington (Interim)
- 2024–present – Shân Wareing

Tim Blackman announced his resignation in May 2019 to take the role of Vice-Chancellor at the Open University.

=== Partners ===
The university validates and issues degrees on behalf of private companies or organisations including:

- New School of Psychotherapy and Counselling

== Research ==
Middlesex's research covers a wide spectrum of subjects across its three faculties, including Art and Design, Education, Human, Social and Economic Geography, Law, Music, Professional Practice, Software Engineering and Algorithms.

Research covers 29 areas. The UK Funding Councils' 2014 Research Excellence Framework (REF) rated 58% of research submitted to be world and internationally excellent.

The UK Funding Councils' 2014 Research Excellence Framework (REF) rated 90% of Middlesex's research internationally recognised.

In 2011 the university's research project on age diversity was selected for inclusion in the Research Councils' "Big Ideas for the Future" report. The report brings together the leading research projects currently taking place across UK universities.

== Student life ==
The university has a student body of around 19,000 in London and over 37,000 globally. The university has student exchange links with over 100 universities in 22 countries across Europe, the United States, and the world.

Until recently the number of students at the university has been declining fast, hitting a four-year low of 21,350 in the academic year of 2008–2009. The number of PG students fell 20% in four years (from over 6,000 graduates in 2005 to less than 5,000 in 2009), while the number of non-EU students were down by a third over the same period. In the academic year of 2009–2010, however, the number of students across all categories increased sharply. The trend continued the following year with particularly high increase in the number of students from the EU.

In 2010 Middlesex had one of the biggest increases in applications at any university – more than 30% – but the demand for places had still grown by another 11% at the start of 2011.

=== Students' Union ===
Middlesex Students' Union (MDXSU) is a non-profit organisation, separate to the university.

In 1981, Union president Nick Harvey joined protests outside Rochester Row police station after six Irish students were detained without charge under the Prevention of Terrorism Act. That year, student John Kennedy stood in the Crosby by-election to highlight the case of seven students suspended from the Polytechnic after a sit-in protest demanding nursery facilities.

== Reputation and rankings ==
Rankings
National rankings
- Complete (2027): 122
- Guardian (2027): 121
- Times / Sunday Times (2027): 116

Global rankings
- QS (2027): 901–950
- THE (2026): 501–600

In the Times Higher Education World University Rankings 2018, Middlesex University was the only modern university in London to feature in the top 500 global universities. In the Times Higher Education Young University Rankings 2017, Middlesex was named the top modern university in London. In the Guardian University Guide 2018, the university's Film Production and Photography course was named the top in London. In The Complete University Guide 2018, its Sports Science and Social Work courses were named the best in London. In 2017/18 the overall satisfaction from the National Student Survey was 77%.

Middlesex is ranked within the top 401–500 universities in the world by the Times Higher Education World University Rankings 2020 and one of the top 100 universities in the world under 50 years old by the Times Higher Education Young University Rankings 2020.

In 2017, Middlesex was recognised for its high-quality teaching in the government's Teaching Excellence Framework. The institute was awarded Silver and commended for valuing and rewarding teaching, as well as enhancing student engagement.

The university has been awarded the Queen's Anniversary Prize three times and has twice received Queen's Award for Enterprise (for its international work).

The Social Science Research Network (SSRN) ranks the university Business School the 209th international business schools in the world.

In 2020 Times Higher Education World University Rankings ranked Middlesex's psychology degrees in the top 201–250 psychology degrees in the world.

In 2022, 2023, and 2024, ARWU ranked Middlesex's psychology degrees in the top 301–400 psychology degrees in the world.

== Notable alumni ==
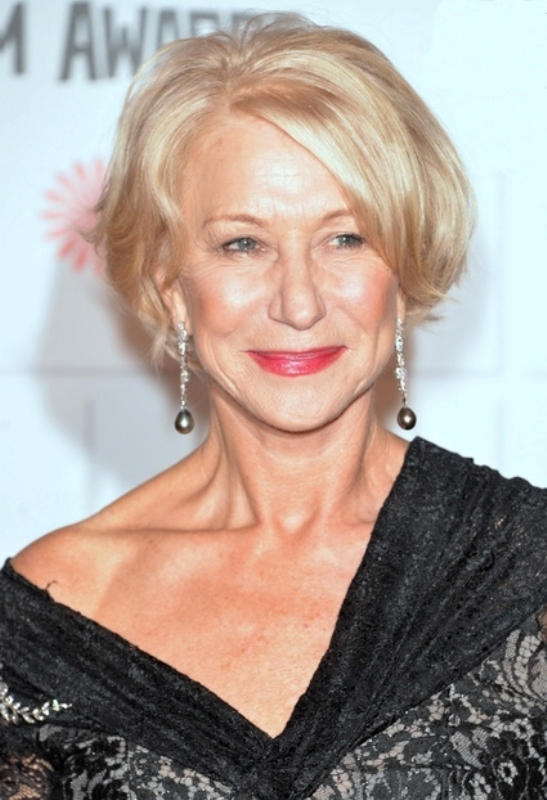
Helen Mirren, actress

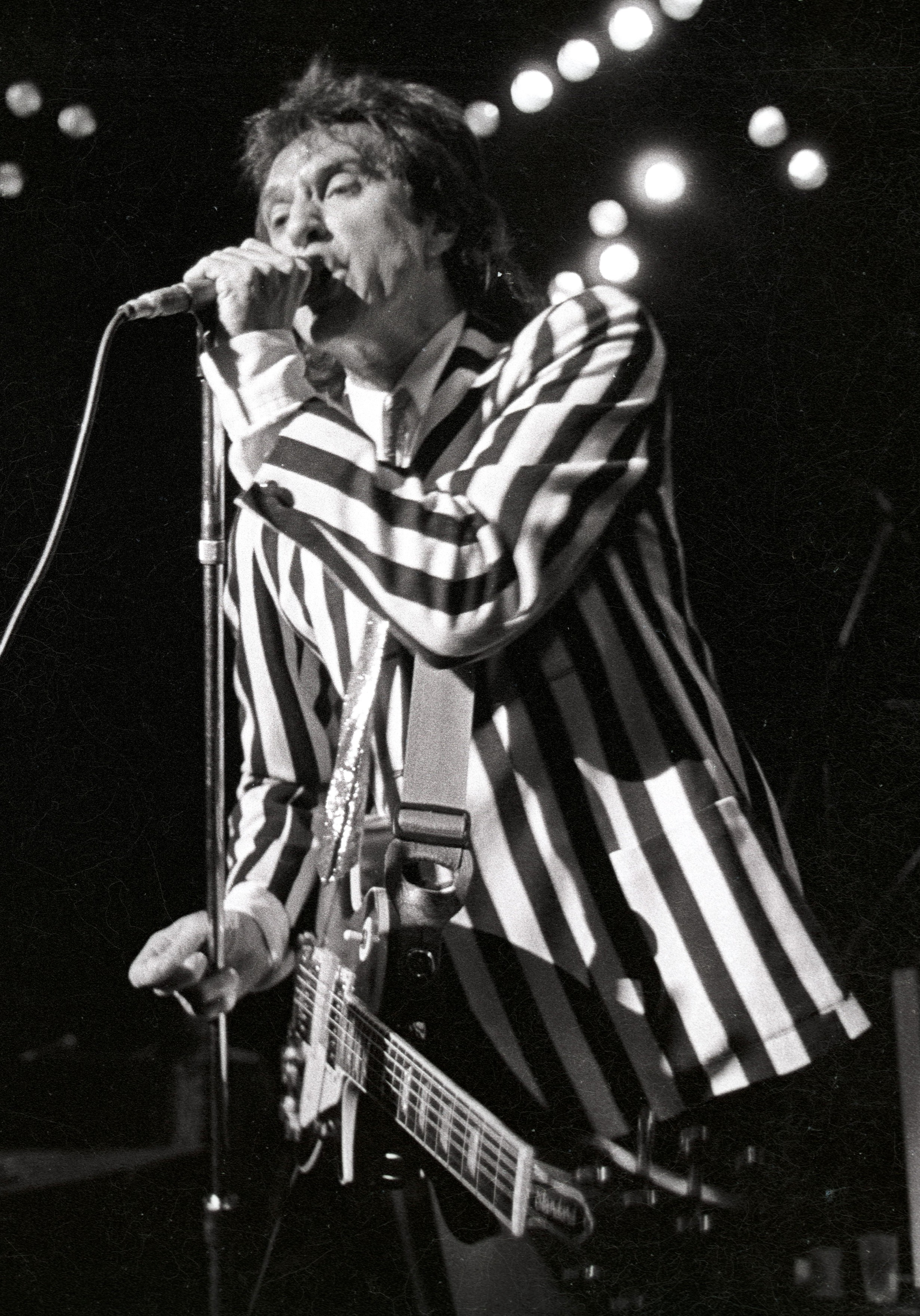
Sir Ray Davies, CBE musician

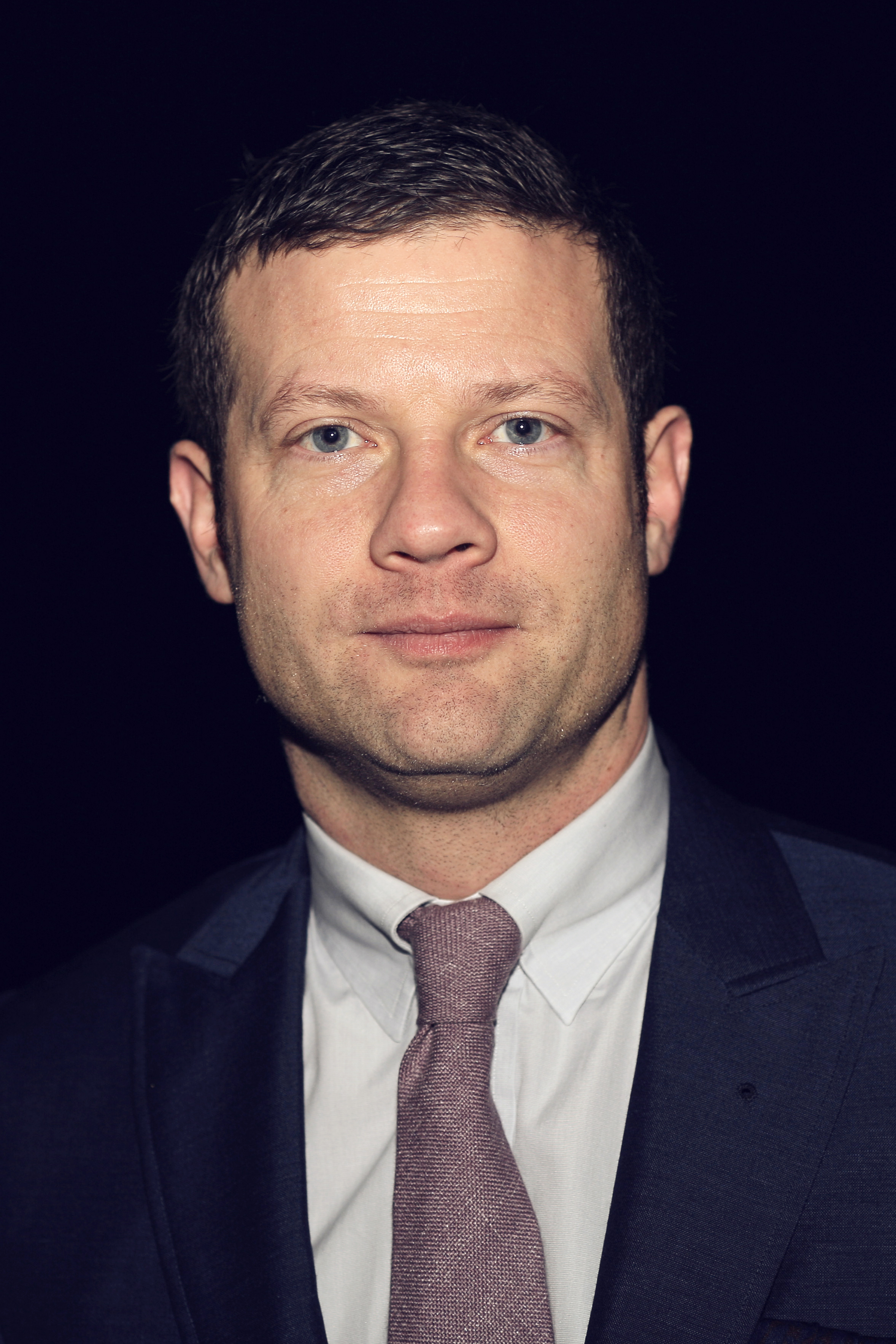
Dermot O'Leary, broadcaster

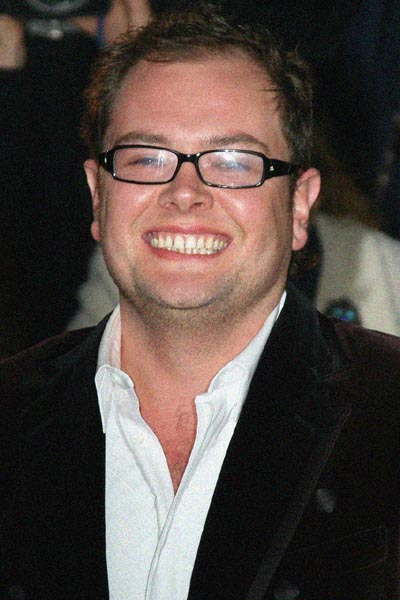
Alan Carr, comedian

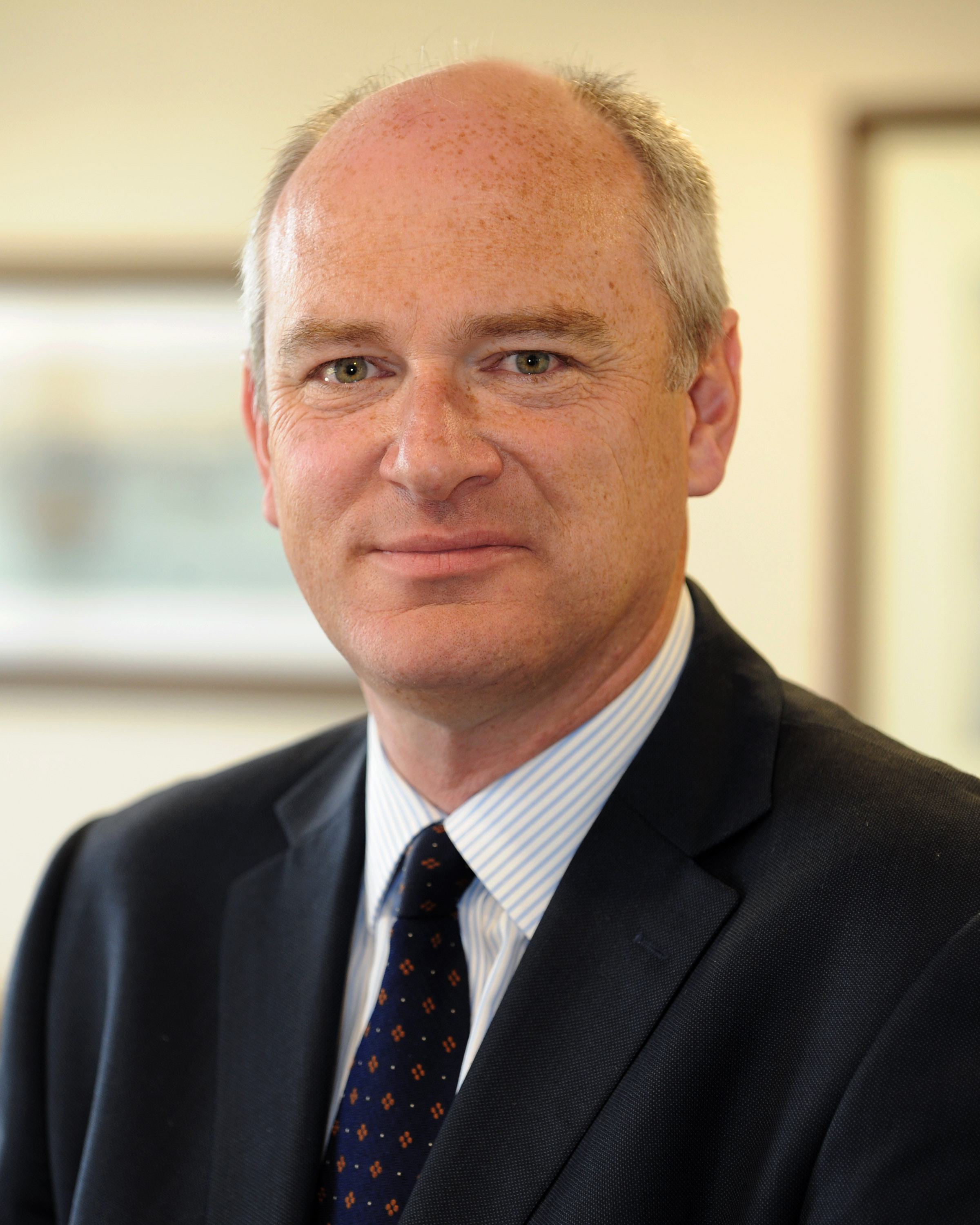
Nick Harvey, MP

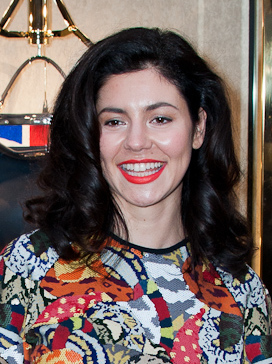
Marina Diamandis, singer

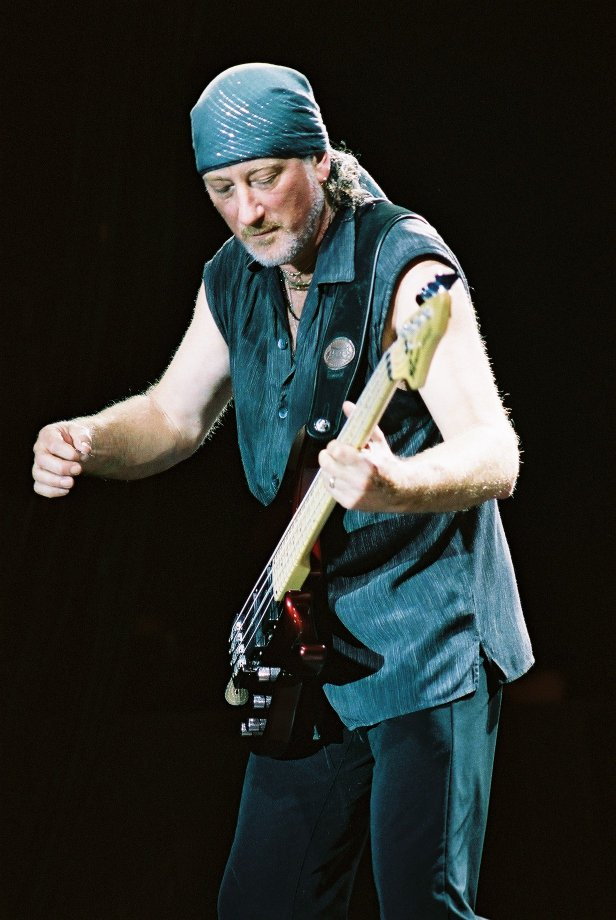
Roger Glover, musician

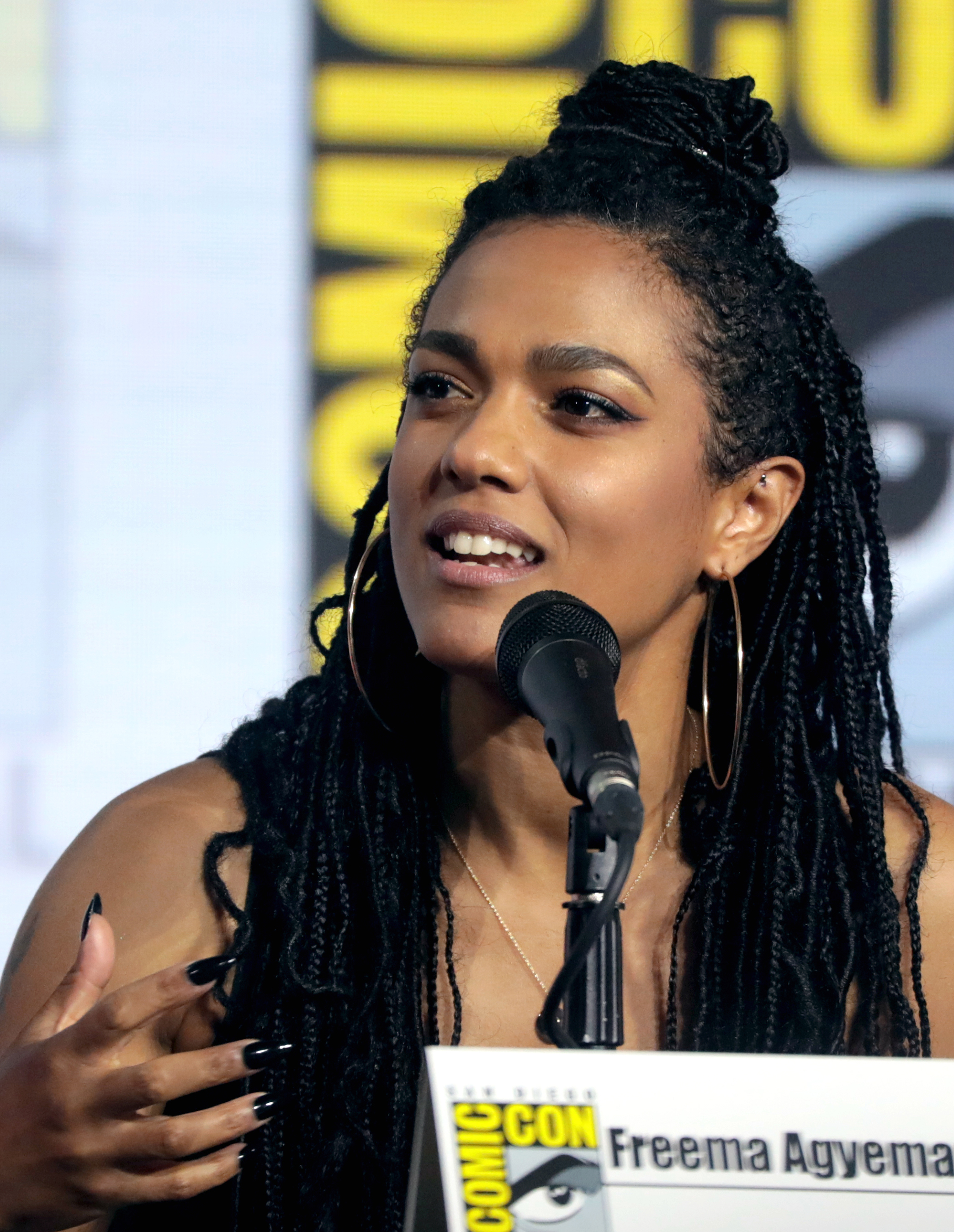
Freema Agyeman, actress

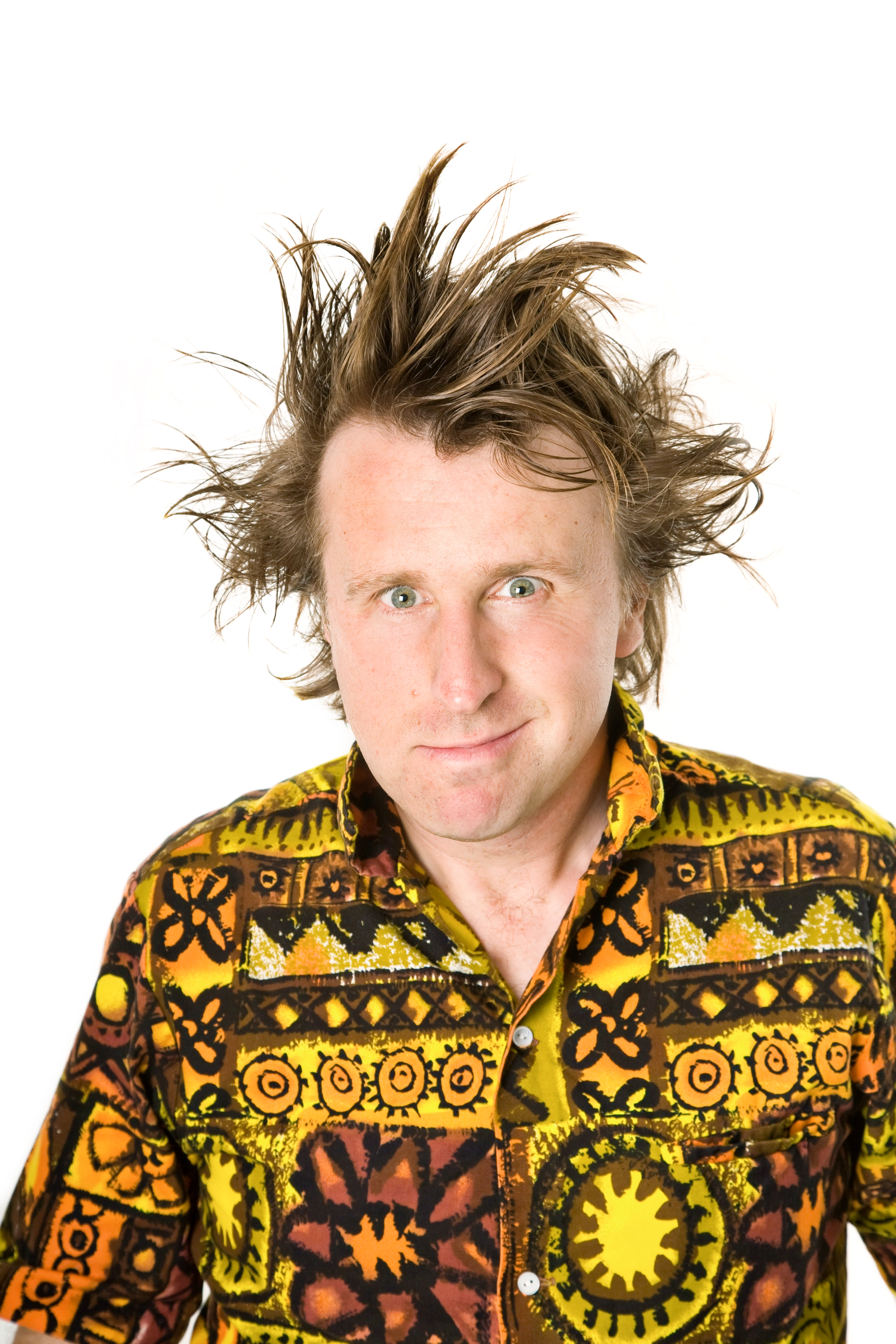
Milton Jones, comedian

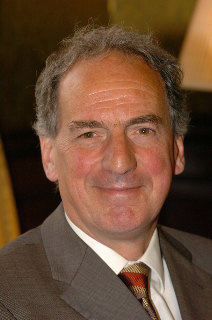
Kim Howells, MP

Middlesex runs an alumni association allowing former students to maintain contact with the university after graduation. It offers discounts and benefits to members and organises reunions and social events.

Although not a graduate, Tommy Flowers, a British engineer who helped create the Colossus computer used to break code during World War II received a basic computing certificate from Hendon College.

== See also ==
- Armorial of UK universities
- Hall-Carpenter Archives
- Hornsey College of Art
- Lansdown Centre for Electronic Arts
- List of universities in the UK
- Museum of Domestic Design and Architecture
- Post-1992 universities
- United Business Institutes
