= National Student Survey =

Survey of final-year degree students in the UK

The National Student Survey is an annual survey, launched in 2005, of all final year undergraduate degree students at institutions in England, Scotland, Wales and Northern Ireland within the United Kingdom. The survey is designed to assess undergraduate students' opinions of the quality of their degree programmes, with seven different scores published including an "overall satisfaction" mark.

NSS is conducted by Ipsos MORI on behalf of the Office for Students and the UK higher education funding bodies.

== Methodology ==
=== Coverage ===
When launched in 2005, the NSS covered all final year undergraduate degree students in publicly funded universities (higher education institutes) in England, Wales and Northern Ireland. All universities were obliged to provide contact details for eligible students, though participation is voluntary for the students themselves. This has since been extended to universities in Scotland.

Since 2008, Further Education Colleges (FECs) with directly funded higher education students in England have been eligible to participate.

The National Student Survey has recently come under scrutiny for its links with the Teaching Excellence Framework (TEF), leading to 25 student associations alongside the National Union of Students supporting a boycott of the NSS in 2017. The NSS link with the Teaching Excellence Framework was criticized in 2017 with a report from the Royal Statistical Society who described that there was 'no reliable association between the two'.

=== Contacting students ===
Contact details for students are supplied by the education institutions to the survey research organisation Ipsos MORI. The survey organisation attempts to contact students in January and February, initially by email, to invite them to participate in the online survey. Students have the opportunity to opt out of the survey. To reduce non-response bias, those who neither respond nor opt out are contacted by post or by telephone.

=== The questionnaire ===
The questionnaire has a core set of 27 attitude questions to assess aspects of the student learning experience.

These are supplemented by open ended questions to capture any particular positive or negative aspects that the student wishes to highlight.

Students studying certain NHS subjects are asked six questions on their work placements.

Participating institutions have the opportunity to add extra questions for their own students. Answers to these are not available publicly, only to the institution and its students union. Questions can be chosen from a bank of questions on the following topics:

- Careers
- Course content and structure
- Work placements
- Social opportunities
- Course delivery
- Feedback from students
- Physical environment
- Welfare resources and facilities
- Workload
- Assessment
- Learning community
- Intellectual motivation

== Results ==
Aggregate results and cross-institution results and analyses of the NSS are published on the Office for Students website. Detailed results suitable for prospective students are published on the Unistats website, alongside results of the Destination of Leavers from Higher Education survey.

Results from the survey form the student-centred dimension of Teaching Quality Information (TQI). As such, they are often incorporated into League tables of British universities alongside other measures such as entry standards, student:staff ratio, dropout rate etc.

Top institutions for student satisfaction have been:

- 2005 Courtauld Institute of Art (100%)
- 2006 Open University (95%)
- 2007 Open University (95%)
- 2008 North Warwickshire and Hinckley College (97%) joint with City College Birmingham (97%)
- 2009 Brooklands College (100%)

Further Education Colleges became eligible for the survey in 2008.

== Criticism and support ==
The Oxford SU announced in 2022 that they would be continuing their three-year boycott against the NSS, claiming to 'fight against the marketisation of students.' In a statement, the SU argued that 'the NSS ranks universities against each other, creating a competitive market of education and turning students into passive consumers. This is damaging to the quality of education because it encourages universities to stream money into marketing or other quick fixes to drive up student satisfaction on paper.'

== Pre-2016 HE White Paper ==
According to the National Union of Students, the results have made institutions and colleges take student feedback more seriously, encouraging them to make changes to the areas such as gaining good quality feedback on work, better access to personal tutors, improved assessment practices and increased investment in resources, equipment and teaching spaces.

The survey was opposed in its early years by the students' unions at Oxford, Cambridge and Warwick. As those universities failed to achieve the necessary 50% response rate threshold, they were excluded from early survey results.

The most publicised boycott was that of the Cambridge University Students' Union (CUSU), who described it as a “waste of government money”, and “irrelevant to the Cambridge experience” and staged a burning of T-shirts and posters. CUSU also objected to the repeated attempts made by Ipsos MORI to contact students.

A number of bodies, including the Commons Education & Skills Select Committee and the National Union of Students responded to boycotts by accusing those students' unions of "elitism" and of encouraging exclusivity.

Since 2008, all HEIs, including Cambridge, Oxford and Warwick, have achieved more than 50% response rate so are included in national results.

Lee Harvey, former director of research and evaluation of the Higher Education Academy (HEA), criticised the NSS in letters published in Times Higher Education, calling it a "hopelessly inadequate improvement tool." Apparently because of the March 2008 letter, he was suspended from his post at the HEA, and subsequently resigned.

There have been allegations of some universities (such as Kingston University) advising students to artificially inflate the scores they give in the survey in the interest of improving the university's status in rankings derived from it. One lecturer told his students to give Kingston good scores because "if Kingston comes bottom ... no one is going to want to employ you because they'll think your degree is shit". Following an investigation of the allegations, the Higher Education Funding Council of England (HEFCE) ordered that Kingston University's Department of Psychology be removed from the 2008-09 League Tables.

Recent research has also highlighted that the ethnicity of teaching staff also affects results. Analysis indicates that, "in general that students are less happy when teaching is predominantly by other ethnic groups."

== HE Bill and NSS boycotts ==
Following the announcement of the Teaching Excellence Framework (TEF), including proposals to use NSS scores as a core metric, numerous students' unions, including the National Union of Students, voted to conduct a boycott of the NSS to display their opposition to the TEF and marketisation of higher education more generally.

Unions boycotting include Oxford University Students' Union, Reading University Students' Union, Bristol, Students Union Arts London, Cambridge University Students' Union, University of Warwick SU, Liverpool Hope SU, Sheffield SU, LSESU, University College London Union and University of Manchester SU.
