= Employability =

Traits enabling a person to be employed

Employability refers to the attributes of a person that make that person able to gain and maintain employment.

== Overview ==
Employability is related to work and the ability to be employed, such as:

- The ability to gain initial employment; hence the interest in ensuring that 'key competencies', careers advice and an understanding about the world of work are embedded in the education system
- The ability to maintain employment and make 'transitions' between jobs and roles within the same organization to meet new job requirements
- The ability to obtain new employment if required, i.e. to be independent in the labour market by being willing and able to manage their own employment transitions between and within organisations (Van der Heijde and Van der Heijden (2005) The continuously fulfilling, acquiring or creating of work through the optimal use of efforts)

Lee Harvey defines employability as the ability of a graduate to get a satisfying job, stating that job acquisition should not be prioritized over preparedness for employment to avoid pseudo measure of individual employability. Lee argues that employability is not a set of skills but a range of experiences and attributes developed through higher-level learning, thus employability is not a "product' but a process of learning.

Employability continues to develop because the graduate, once employed, does not stop learning (i.e. continuous learning). Thus employability by this definition is about learning, not least learning how to learn, and it is about empowering learners as critical reflective citizens. Harvey's (2001) definition is important for it emphasizes the employability of graduates, which is similar to our context, hence, able to provide insight about how to measure graduates' employability and what are the differences between graduates and experienced individuals in the labor market.

There are numerous terms for employability skills, they are often used interchangeably with terms such as soft skills, generic skills, 21st century skills, generic attributes, transferable skills, generic competencies and holistic competencies. Chan at the University of Hong Kong uses holistic competencies as an umbrella term inclusive of different types of generic skills (e.g. critical thinking, problem-solving skills, positive values, and attitudes (e.g. resilience, appreciation for others) which are essential for students’ life-long learning and whole-person development (Chan, Fong, Luk, & Ho, 2017; Chan & Yeung, 2019). In order to understand how holistic competencies should be developed based on student perception, the Holistic Competency Development Framework (HCDF) was developed (Chan & Yeung, 2019). The HCDF consists of five key components that are fundamental to holistic competency development: 1) student characteristics; 2) rationale for learning; 3) students’ actual learning experience and perceptions and interpretations based on that experience; 4) students’ approaches to developing holistic competency; and 5) students’ development of holistic competency as outcomes. The HCDF is an adaption of Bigg's 3P Student Approach to Learn model (1987). Chan realised that traditional learning processes such as the 3P model do not apply to soft skills development because students who are deep learners in the academic context do not necessarily become deep learners in soft skills education. Thus, the words ‘deep’ and ‘surface’ with respect to academic knowledge are unsuitable in the soft skills context. Accordingly, a new term was coined, Approach to Develop, for conceptualising student engagement in experiential learning leading to the development of holistic competencies. Unlike academic knowledge, holistic competencies must be developed by experience. As an illustration, leadership skills cannot be learnt by reading a book; the learner must have opportunities to observe and experience what leadership is. Hence, the word ‘learn’ can be used to describe academic knowledge acquisition, whilst ‘develop’ is preferable for describing holistic competency education. Validated instruments for assessing student's holistic competencies awareness have been developed (Chan, Zhao & Luk, 2017; Chan & Luk, 2020) although the assessment literacy of competency for both teachers and students remains challenging (Chan & Luo, 2020).

Berntson (2008) argues that employability refers to an individual's perception of his or her possibilities of getting new, equal, or better employment. Berntson's study differentiates employability into two main categories – actual employability (objective employability) and perceived employability (subjective employability).

Research into employability is not a single cohesive body work. Employability is investigated in the fields of industrial and organizational psychology, career development, industrial sociology, and the sociology of education, among others. Several employability definitions have been developed based on, or including input from business and industry. In the United States, an Employability Skills Framework was developed through a collaboration of employers, educators, human resources associations, and labour market associations. This framework states, "Employability skills are general skills that are necessary for success in the labor market at all employment levels and in all sectors". After conducting research with employers across Canada, the Conference Board of Canada released Employability Skills 2000+, which defines employability as "the skills you need to enter, stay in, and progress in the world of work". Saunders & Zuzel (2010) found that employers valued personal qualities such as dependability and enthusiasm over subject knowledge and ability to negotiate.

== In relation to freelance or ad hoc work ==
In the future fewer will be employed and more people work as free lancers or ad hoc on projects. Robin Chase, co-founder of Zip Car, argues that in the future more work will be done as freelancers or ad hoc works. Collaborative economy and other similar platforms are reinventing capitalism, for example platforms like Freelancer.com, a new way of organizing demand and supply. Freelancer is also an example of how employability can be developed even for people who are not employed – Freelancers offers exposure of certification and in the future similar platforms will also offer continuous upgrade of competencies for the people associated.

== In relation to university degree choice ==
The Complete University Guide website (based in London within the United Kingdom) lists the ten most employable degree subjects, indicating the degree of employability with a percentage (of graduates exiting university who subsequently obtain employment). The subject with the most employment is dentistry, the subjects with ordinately less employment, after the 1st most are as follows; nursing, veterinary medicine, medicine, physiotherapy, medical technology, optometry ophthalmology orthoptics, occupational therapy, land and property management, aural and oral sciences.

Graduate employability, focused on the ways in which higher education equips graduates to meet the needs of the labour market, has become a central feature of universities' missions and branding, and is included in university league tables such as the QS World University Rankings. Universities' have pursued a range of strategies to support their graduates' employability, and graduate employability researchers have considered a number of models based on various kinds of human capital, dispositions, and psycho-social influences.

== Experiential learning and its influences on employability ==
Experiential learning is "the process whereby knowledge is created through the transformation of experience. Knowledge results from the combination of grasping and transforming experience." But "(e)xperience needs to be integrated into formal learning, intentionally and systematically, to enhance academic study." Internships have been found to have a positive influence on employability skills development from both an employer and student perspective.

== Organizational issues ==
Employability creates organizational issues, because future competency needs may require re-organization in many ways. The increasing automation and use of technology also makes it relevant to discuss not only change but also transformation in tasks for people. The issues are relevant at government level, at corporate level and for individuals.

== See also ==
- Adult education
- Education
- Employment of autistic people
- Life skills
- Literacy
- Study skills
- Vocational training
