= Lee Harvey =

Lee Harvey may refer to:

- Lee Harvey (academic) (born 1949), British academic and policy analyst
- Lee Harvey (footballer) (born 1966), retired English footballer
- Lee Harvey, rapper on the 2001 song "Lapdance"

== See also ==
- Lee Harvey Oswald (1939–1963), assassin of American president John F. Kennedy
- Tracie Andrews (born 1969), convicted murderer of her fiancé Lee Raymond Harvey
