= Facila =

Primary school training

Facila was a training program, in Southern Europe, for adults with short primary schooling. The objective was to prepare students for validation processes and secondary education. Many participants were entrepreneurs, owners or employees of small and medium enterprises (SMEs). In these cases the program provides opportunity for training in entrepreneurship and "continuous improvement" to enhance the participant's employability.

The program started in 2007 as a cooperation between Sweden and Portugal. It is based on the Swedish program "Kunskapslyftet" and adapted to Southern European conditions on an initiative by Johan Frisk.

== Continuous improvement projects ==
Apart from basic training, the main objective of the Facila program was to teach students how to prepare improvement projects. The students review their work, both task and physical space, then look for patterns and flaws which are expressed using a mathematical analysis. The process, which increases the students employability, is fundamental to finding clues for improvements in productivity and decrease in work related injuries.
