= Further Education Funding Council for England =

- Abbreviation: FEFC
- Founded: 6 May 1992; 34 years ago
- Dissolved: 31 March 2001; 25 years ago
- Legal status: Non-departmental public body
- Purpose: Further education in England
- Location: Cheylesmore House, Cheylesmore, Coventry, England
- Region served: England
- Main organ: National Council
- Website: FEFC

The Further Education Funding Council for England (FEFC) was a non-departmental public body of the Department for Education and Skills which distributed funding to Further Education and Sixth Form Colleges in England between 1992 and 2001.

It was created by the Further and Higher Education Act 1992 and abolished by the Learning and Skills Act 2000, being replaced by the Learning and Skills Council (LSC).

== Background ==
The government's reasons for creating the FEFC were set out in their 1991 white paper Education and Training for the 21st Century.

== Staff ==
During its nine-year life the FEFC had two chief executives and three chairs. The first chief executive was Sir William Stubbs and its second chief executive Prof David Melville. The first chair was Sir Robert Gunn followed by Lord Bryan Davies and Lord Tony Newton.

== Resurrection? ==
In November 2009, David Willetts issued a consultation document on Conservative policy for Further Education. The document promised to reinstate the FEFC.
