= Allen Sheppard, Baron Sheppard of Didgemere =

British industrialist

The Right Honourable The Lord Sheppard of Didgemere KCVO

Member of the House of Lords
- Lord Temporal
- Life peerage 6 September 1994 – 25 March 2015

Personal details
- Born: 25 December 1932
- Died: 25 March 2015 (aged 82)
- Party: Conservative
- Education: London School of Economics

Allen John George Sheppard, Baron Sheppard of Didgemere, KCVO (25 December 1932 – 25 March 2015) was a British industrialist and Conservative member of the House of Lords.

He was educated at Ilford County High School and the London School of Economics. He worked first in car manufacturing: Ford of Britain and Ford of Europe, 1958–68; Rootes/Chrysler, 1968–71; British Leyland, 1971–75. He then moved to Grand Metropolitan, 1975–96, being Chief Executive, 1986–93 and Chairman, 1987–96.

From 1996 to 2003, he was non-executive chairman of GB Railways Group Plc, a train company listed on the Alternative Investment Market which operated the Anglia Railways franchise, and which launched GB Railfreight and Hull Trains.

He was chairman of the Board of Trustees, Prince's Youth Business Trust, 1990–94 and of the Prince's Trust Council, 1995–98. He was a member of the Board of Management of the Conservative Party, 1993–98. He was a governor of LSE since 1989 and was Chancellor, Middlesex University 2000–13.

He received a knighthood in 1990 Birthday Honours, having the accolade conferred by The Queen on 4 December 1990. He was created a life peer as Baron Sheppard of Didgemere, of Roydon in the County of Essex on 6 September 1994, and was appointed a Knight Commander of the Royal Victorian Order (KCVO) in the 1998 New Year Honours.

== Arms ==
Coat of arms of Allen Sheppard, Baron Sheppard of Didgemere

Crest
A red setter sejant erect Proper plain gorged and chained to the dexter Or to an oak tree Sable leaved and fructed Gold.
Escutcheon
Or three red setters rampant Proper each grasping in the dexter forepaw a seaxe Sable.
Supporters
On either side a goat Sable that to the dexter supporting a shepherd's crook and that to the sinister supporting a palmer's staff both Or.
Motto
Fieri Potest
