= Michael Driscoll (economist) =

English economist and university administrator

Michael John Driscoll (born 27 October 1950) is a British economist. He was chair of the Coalition of Modern Universities in the UK and from 1996 to 2015 was vice-chancellor of Middlesex University in London. In 2016, he was appointed president and vice-chancellor of Taylor's University in Malaysia.

== Early life ==
Driscoll was born and brought up in Warrington. From obtained a BA in Economics from Trent Polytechnic.

== Career ==
He lectured in economics at the University of Birmingham from 1977 to 1989. He spent three years during this period on secondments at the OECD in Paris. From 1989 to 1991 he was Head of Economics at Middlesex University.

He was chairman of the Coalition of Modern Universities from 2003 to 2007 (became Million+ in 2004).
