= Lifelong Learning UK =

Lifelong Learning UK (LLUK) was one of the independent, Sector Skills Councils (SSCs) for UK employers in the lifelong learning sector. It was responsible for the professional development of all those working in community learning and development, further education, higher education, libraries, archives and information services, and work based learning across the UK.

SSCs are recognised by governments throughout the UK as the independent, employer-led organisations which ensure that the skills system is driven by employers' needs.

LLUK had five strategic goals:

1. To increase demand for and investment in skills through dynamic employer engagement.
2. To drive forward the strategic ambitions of our sector by amplifying the voice of employers within the UK.
3. To provide credible and respected labour market intelligence to drive employers’, partners’ and policy makers’ workforce development activities.
4. To develop and promote relevant and fit-for-purpose learning and skills solutions to meet lifelong learning employers’ needs.
5. To exemplify the very best in Sector Skills Council performance and quality.

Their vision is for ‘A world class lifelong learning workforce that enables a more prosperous economy and an inclusive society.’

The strategic significance of LLUK cannot be underestimated. It is the cornerstone of UK-wide policy to widen participation in education and training, to promote social inclusion and to increase prosperity.

Lifelong Learning UK ceased to operate as a Sector Skills Council on 31 March 2011. Many of LLUK's responsibilities transferred to the Learning and Skills Improvement Service, but there is no longer a formal sector skills council in this sector. The Institute for Learning (IfL) and sector skills body LLUK professional standards have been incorporated by the Government backed Education and Training Foundation, set up in October 2013 to support the further education sector.

A subsidiary of LLUK is Standards Verification UK. They are responsible for the verification of initial teacher training plus other forms of workforce training and development. Standards Verification UK ceased operations on 31 March 2011.
