= Graduate Outcomes =

UK statistical survey

Graduate Outcomes is a statistical survey of graduates from higher education courses in the UK. The survey attempts to contact all recipients of higher education qualifications approximately 15 months after graduation. It aims to gather statistics on the employment and study activities of graduates, and their subjective opinions on the value of their higher education and qualifications. The survey is delivered by HESA (Higher Education Statistics Agency) to help universities and colleges fulfil their legal requirement to report on the outcomes of higher education to the UK higher education funding and regulatory bodies (e.g. the Office for Students).

== Background ==
The Graduate Outcomes survey replaces the former Destination of Leavers from Higher Education (DLHE) survey. Whereas the DLHE survey was undertaken by universities contacting their own graduates 6 months after graduation, the Graduate Outcomes survey is run centrally by HESA 15 months after graduation using contact details provided by universities and colleges.

The survey was launched in December 2018 with a survey of graduates who gained qualifications in August to October 2017.

== Methodology ==
The survey takes the form of an online questionnaire distributed by email to graduates who gained a higher education qualification. Graduates are also contacted by telephone if they do not complete the online survey, or if a valid email address is not available.

Universities and colleges who award higher education qualifications in the UK are legally obliged to participate in the survey and provide contact details of their graduates to HESA or the Office for Students. Completion of the survey is voluntary for graduates, but the survey aims for a high response rate to generate representative statistics on the outcomes of publicly funded and regulated higher education.

Graduate Outcomes is the largest annual social survey in the UK, attempting to contact approximately 700,000 graduates each year.

== Comparable surveys ==
=== Ireland ===
In Ireland, the Higher Education Authority publishes the Graduate Outcomes Survey, a national survey of higher education graduates conducted nine months after graduation. Ireland has tracked graduate outcomes through an annual survey since 1982; the survey was formerly known as "First Destinations" and is now known as the Graduate Outcomes Survey.

The Irish survey is distributed to graduates of higher education institutions and identifies graduates' main destination after graduation, including employment, continuing study, unemployment and other activities. It also gathers information on graduates' perceptions of the relevance of their studies and the requirement for their qualification in their employment. For the Class of 2024, just under 71,000 graduates were surveyed, with a response rate of 50.9%; 80.2% were working or due to start work nine months after graduation, and 10.7% were engaged in further study.
