= William Stubbs (educator) =

Scottish educator

Sir William Hamilton Stubbs FRSA
- Born: November 5, 1937; Hillhead, Glasgow, Scotland
- Education: St Aloysius' College, Glasgow; University of Glasgow
- Occupations: educator, academic administrator
- Known for: Rector of the University of the Arts London

Sir William Hamilton Stubbs FRSA (born 5 November 1937) is a Scottish educator. He was Rector of the University of the Arts, London.

Stubbs was born in Hillhead, Glasgow, the son of Joseph Stubbs and Mary Nichol. He was educated at St Aloysius' College, Glasgow and University of Glasgow.

Stubbs served for six years as chief executive of the Inner London Education Authority. Following that, he was chief executive of the Polytechnics and Colleges Funding Council.

He served from 1992 to 1996 as chief executive of the Further Education Funding Council for England, and was then appointed as rector of the London Institute (later University of the Arts). He was a member of the National Committee of Inquiry into Higher Education that published an influential report in 1997.
