= Rankings of universities in the United Kingdom =

Rankings of higher education providers in the United Kingdom

Three national rankings of universities in the United Kingdom are published annually by the Complete University Guide and The Guardian, as well as a collaborative list by The Times and The Sunday Times. Rankings have also been produced in the past by The Daily Telegraph and the Financial Times.

British universities rank highly in global university rankings with eight featuring in the top 100 of all three major global rankings as of 2024: QS, Times Higher Education, and ARWU. The national rankings differ from global rankings with a focus on the quality of undergraduate education, as opposed to research prominence and faculty citations.

The primary aim of domestic rankings is to inform prospective undergraduate applicants about universities based on a range of criteria, including: entry standards, student satisfaction, staff–student ratio, expenditure per student, research quality, degree classifications, completion rates, and graduate outcomes. All of the league tables also rank universities in individual subjects.

As of 2025, the top-five ranked universities in the United Kingdom are Oxford, Cambridge, London School of Economics (LSE), St Andrews, and Durham, with Imperial College London, Bath and Warwick also appearing in the top ten of all three rankings.

== Summary of national rankings ==
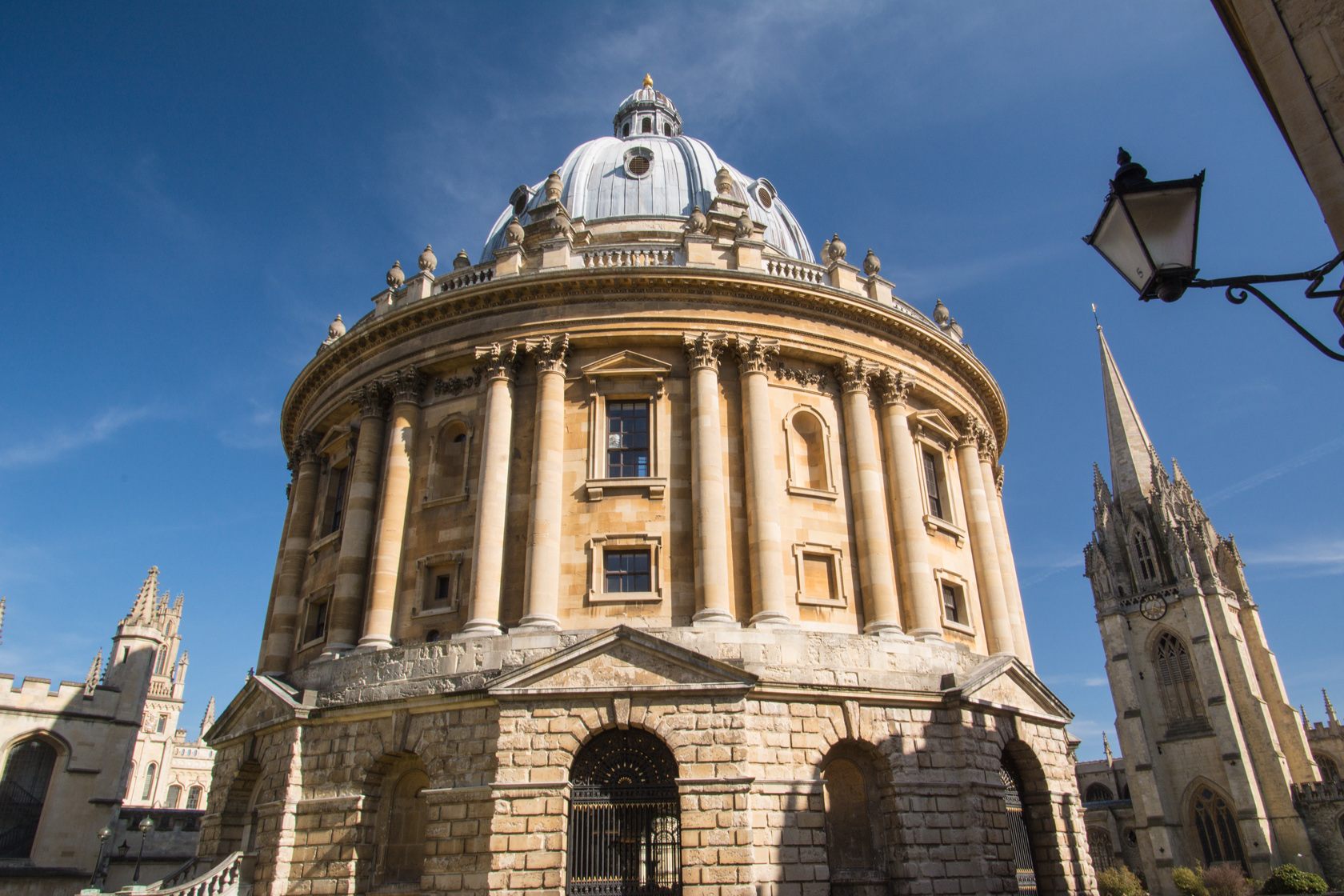
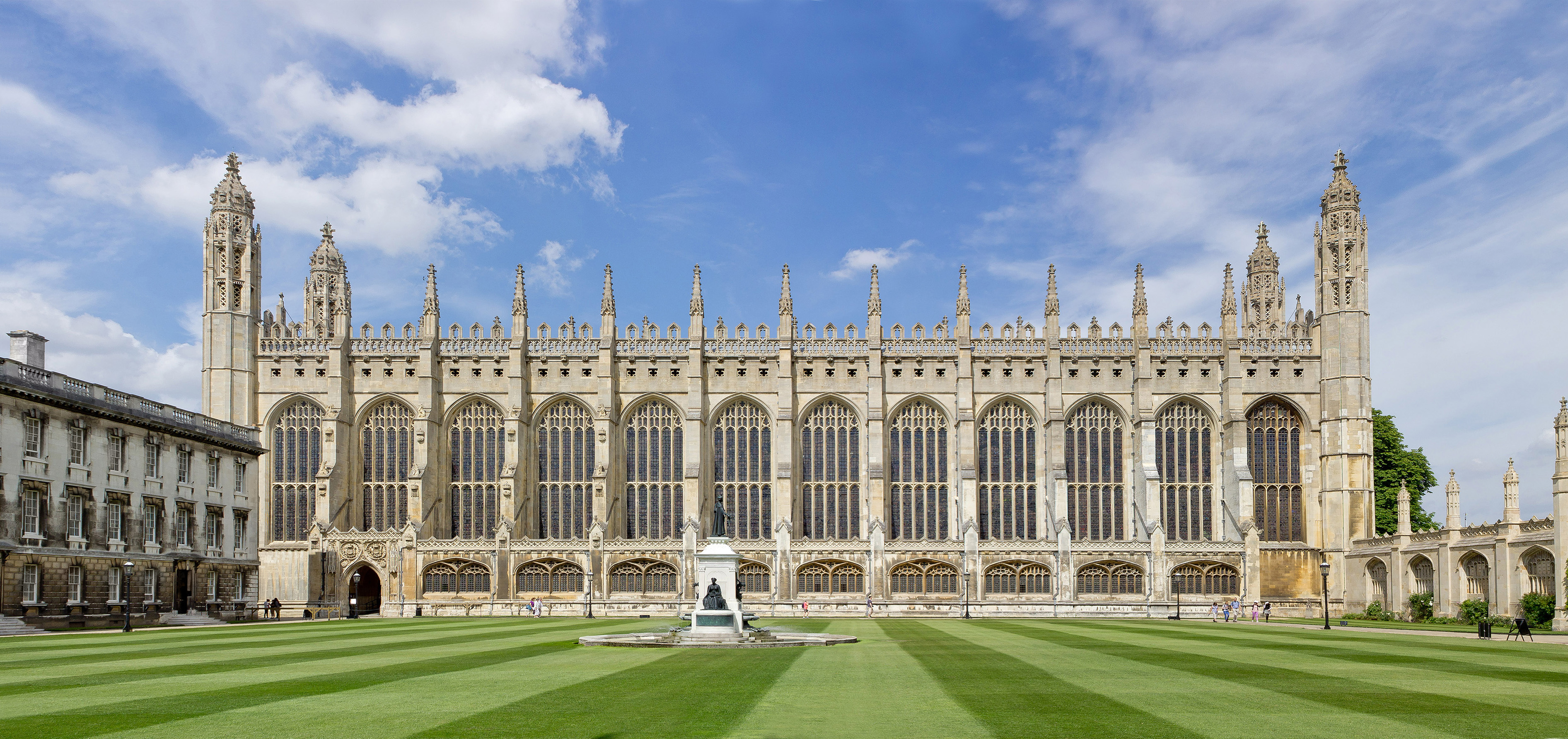
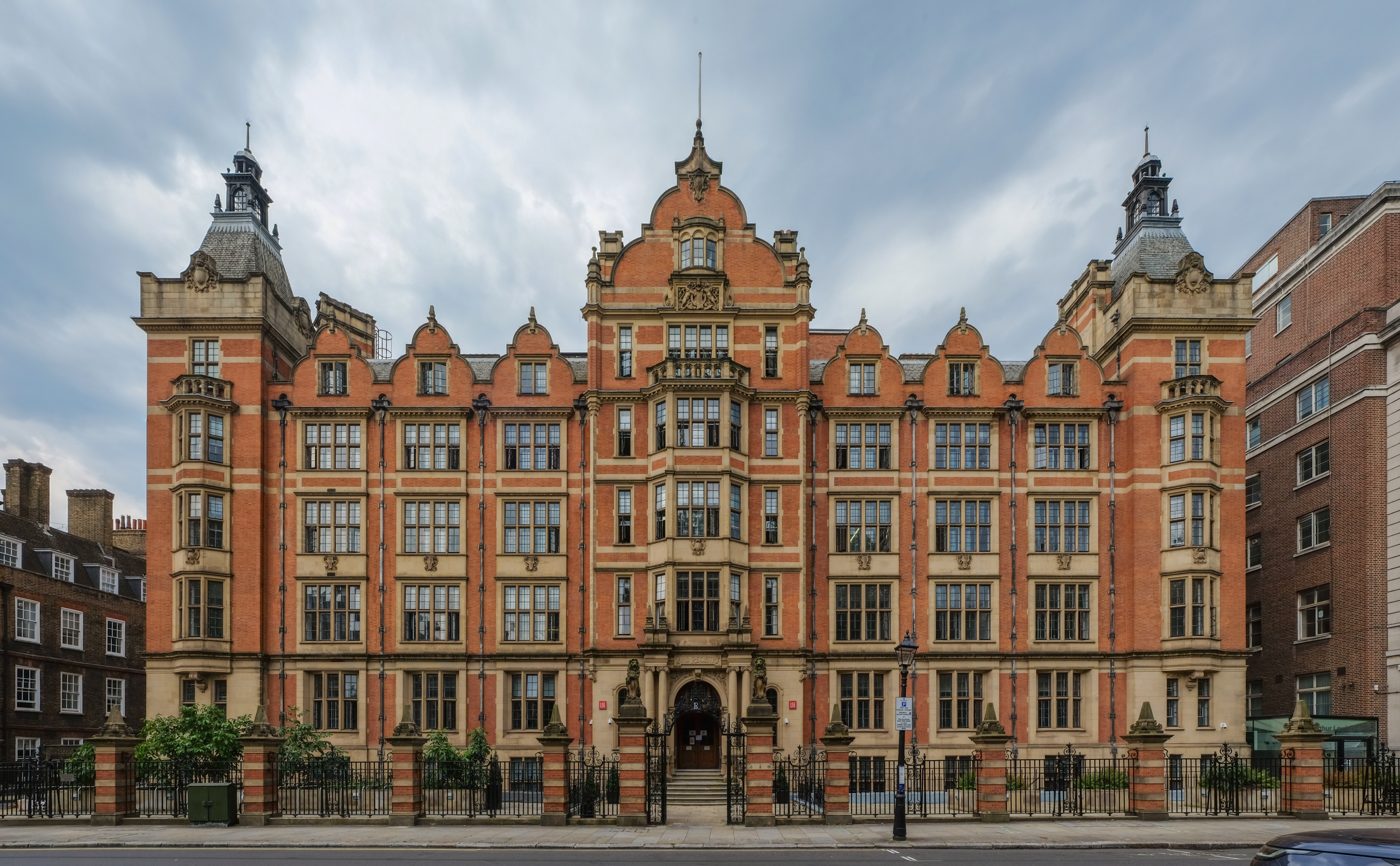
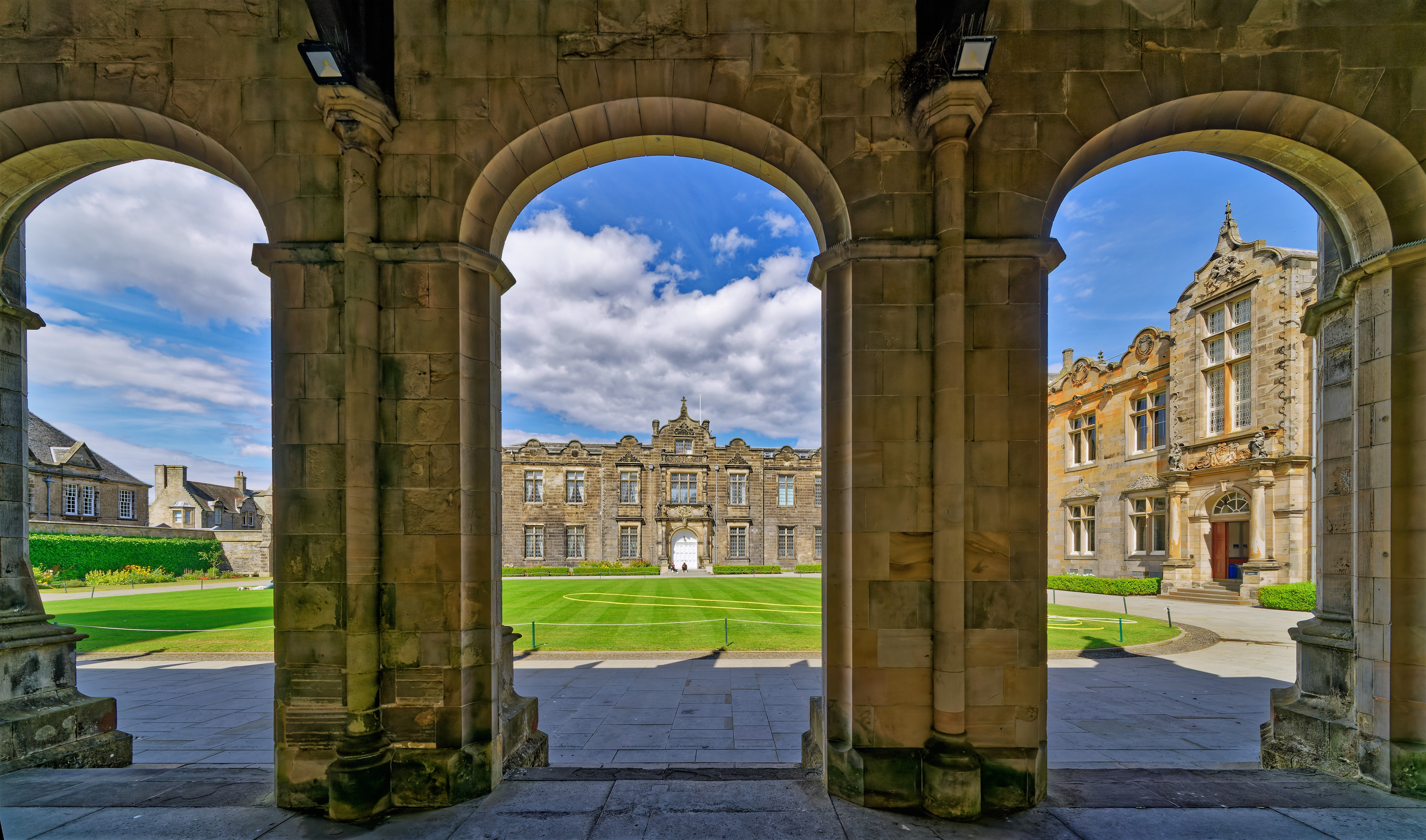
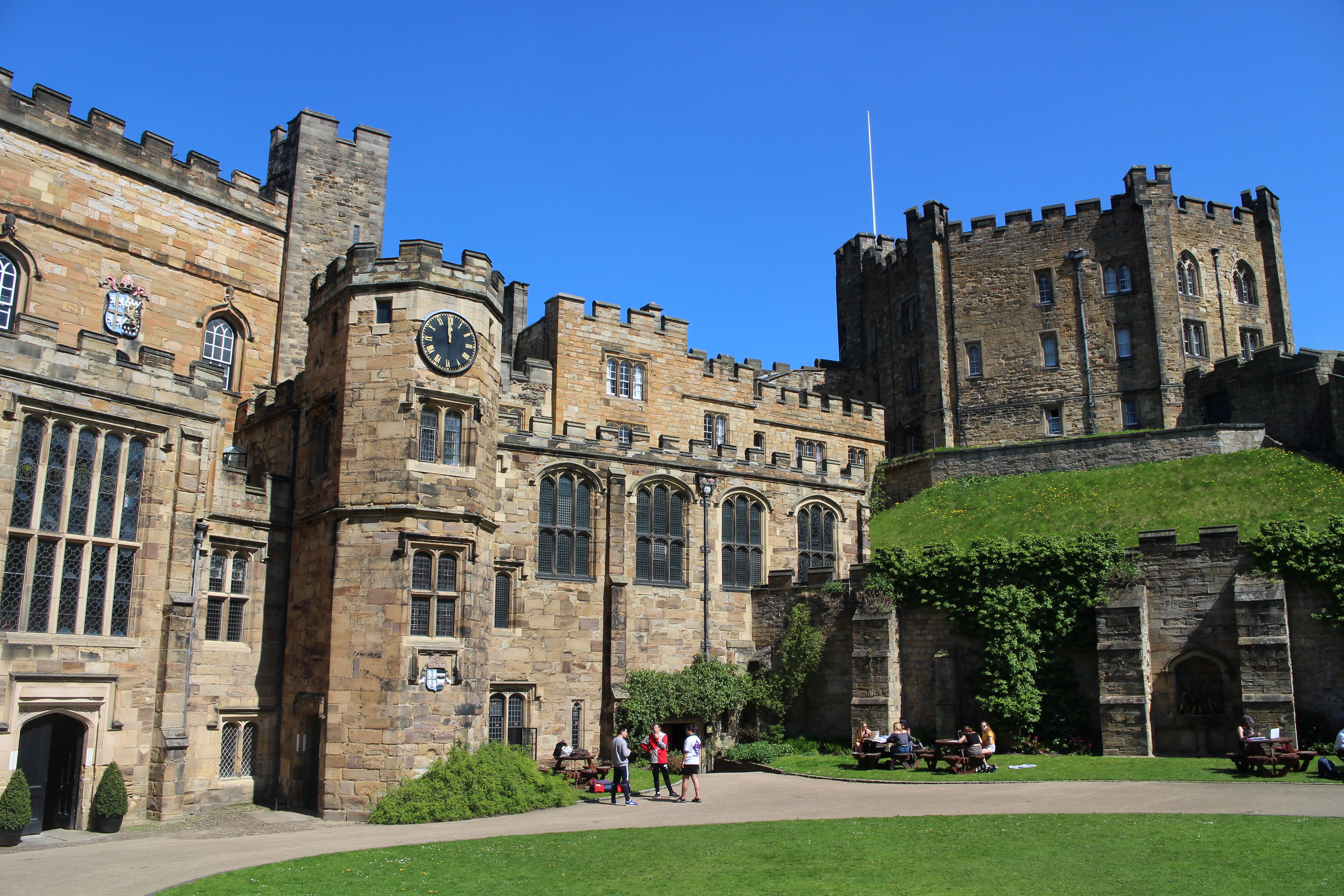
Oxford, Cambridge, LSE, St Andrews, and Durham ranked as the top-five British universities in 2025.

From 2008 to 2022, the three main national rankings—Complete, Guardian, and Times—were averaged each year to form an overall league table by the Times Higher Education Table of Tables; in its final edition, the top-five universities were Oxford, Cambridge, LSE, St Andrews, and Imperial.

=== Rankings published in 2025-2026 for the prospective years 2026-2027 (1–25) ===
Pos	University	Average	Complete	Guardian	Times (Note: Entries 11–130 have been omitted due to copyright.)
1	St Andrews	2.3	4	2	1▲
2=	Cambridge	2.7	1▲	3	4
2=	Oxford	2.7	2	1▲	5▼
4	LSE	3	3	4	2
5	Imperial	5	6 ▼	6 ▼	3 ▲
6	Durham	5.3	5 ▲	5 ▲	6
7	Warwick	7.7	9 ▲	7 ▲	7 ▲
8	Bath	8	8	8 ▼	8 ▲
9	Loughborough	10.3	7 ▼	11 ▼	13
10	UCL	10.7	13 ▼	10 ▼	9 ▼
11	Lancaster	13.0	10	14 ▼	—
12	Bristol	13.3	15 ▲	15 ▲	10 ▲
13	Exeter	14.0	11 ▲	17 ▲	—
14	Sheffield	15.0	16 ▲	16 ▲	–
15	Southampton	18.0	17 ▲	20 ▲	—
16	Edinburgh	18.7	18 ▼	13 ▲	—
17	Birmingham	19.3	14 ▼	28 ▼	—
18	King's	19.7	19 ▲	21 ▲	—
19	Liverpool	20.7	23 ▼	21 ▲	—
20	Strathclyde	22.7	38 ▼	19 ▼	–
21	York	23.3	12 ▲	38 ▼	—
22	Aberdeen	23.7	30 ▲	18 ▼	—
23	Surrey	24.3	19 ▼	23 ▼	—
24	Leeds	25	21 ▲	28 ▲	—
25	Glasgow	25.7	31 ▼	24 ▼	—

=== Rankings published in 2025 for the prospective year 2026 (26–130) ===
Pos	University	Average	Complete	Guardian	Times
26	Essex	28.3	29	12	—
27	Cardiff	29.0	22	37	—
28	Dundee	29.3	39	26	—
29=	Queen's Belfast	30.0	24	45	—
29=	Manchester	30.0	28	35	—
31=	Heriot-Watt	31.7	25	31	—
31=	Arts London	31.7	33	9	—
33	Leicester	33.7	33	40	—
34	Nottingham	35.7	26	51	—
35	Swansea	36.3	40	32	—
36	Nottingham Trent	39.0	46	25	—
37	Manchester Met	40.3	50	33	—
38	Portsmouth	43.0	42	35	—
39	Northumbria	43.7	37	47	—
40	Aston	44.3	44	48	—
41	Reading	44.7	36	65	—
42	Sussex	46.7	43	52	—
43	East Anglia	47.0	26	75	—
44	Chichester	47.3	60	28	—
45=	Royal Holloway (Note: Member institution of the University of London.)	48.7	35	79	—
45=	Newcastle	48.7	31	81	—
47	Queen Mary	49.3	41	72	—
48	Aberystwyth	49.7	45	62	—
49	Keele	51.3	68	43	—
50	Ulster	51.7	54	52	—
51	West of England	52.7	62	39	—
52	Edge Hill	55.3	57	46	—
53	Oxford Brookes	57.7	48	56	—
54	West London	58.3	70	41	—
55	Bangor	58.7	55	62	—
56	Liverpool John Moores	59.7	76	42	—
57	Lincoln	60.0	52	64	—
58	Kent	61.7	49	80	—
59	City St George's	62.3	53	86	—
60	Harper Adams	63.0	47	—	—
61	Arts Bournemouth	64.7	61	60	—
62	Hertfordshire	66.0	82	49	—
63	South Wales	67.3	77	43	—
64	Abertay	68.7	94	50	—
65	Coventry	69.0	59	70	—
66	Stirling	69.7	51	103	—
67	Sunderland	71.7	83	27	—
68	Plymouth	72.3	75	84	—
69=	Cardiff Met	74.7	66	87	—
69=	Gloucestershire	74.7	72	68	—
71=	Goldsmiths	75.0	71	67	—
71=	Glasgow Caledonian	75.0	85	104	—
73	Norwich Arts	76.0	58	66	—
74	Robert Gordon	76.3	87	92	—
75=	Bath Spa	76.7	92	61	—
75=	St Mary's	76.7	69	93	—
75=	Teesside	76.7	90	56	—
78	Falmouth	77.3	62	83	—
79	Derby	77.7	79	58	—
80	Salford	78.7	79	85	—
81	Kingston	79.3	89	55	—
82	Hull	80.0	81	99	—
83=	Solent	80.3	107	58	—
83=	Edinburgh Napier	80.3	96	94	—
85	Suffolk	80.7	55	90	—
86=	SOAS	84.3	62	116	—
86=	Chester	84.3	74	70	—
88	Plymouth Marjon	85.0	100	—	—
89	Liverpool Hope	85.7	90	77	—
90=	Leeds Beckett	87.3	78	101	—
90=	Bradford	87.3	107	69	—
90=	Huddersfield	87.3	65	95	—
93=	Bournemouth	87.7	72	112	—
93=	Staffordshire	87.7	94	82	—
95	Sheffield Hallam	89.0	84	88	—
96	East London	91.0	126	33	—
97	Queen Margaret	92.0	114	96	—
98	Central Lancashire	92.3	86	98	—
99	Greater Manchester	94.0	102	54	—
100	UWTSD	94.3	111	73	—
101=	Canterbury Christ Church	95.7	99	107	—
101=	Leeds Trinity	95.7	122	75	—
103=	Lincoln Bishop	96.0	118	—	—
103=	Brighton	96.0	88	110	—
105	Buckinghamshire New	97.0	97	74	—
106	London South Bank	99.3	110	77	—
107	Brunel	100.3	67	117	—
108	Hartpury	101.0	—	—	—
109	Worcester	101.7	93	114	—
110	Leeds Arts	103.0	103	—	—
111	Winchester	103.3	98	106	—
112	Greenwich	108.3	106	119	—
113	Northampton	109.0	119	90	—
114	Birmingham City	109.7	103	113	—
115	York St John	110.7	105	115	—
116	Wolverhampton	112.7	109	108	—
117=	Birmingham Newman	113.0	124	108	—
117=	Creative Arts	113.0	112	100	—
119	London Met	113.7	128	89	—
120	Cumbria	114.0	117	96	—
121	Anglia Ruskin	115.0	120	102	—
122	De Montfort	115.3	120	118	—
123	Middlesex	116.7	113	121	—
124	Bedfordshire	117.3	130	104	—
125	Roehampton	119.7	115	120	—
126=	Westminster	120.0	123	122	—
126=	West of Scotland	120.0	127	123	—
128	Wrexham	120.7	129	111	—
129	Buckingham	122.0	116	—	—
130	RAU	127.5	125	—	—

== League tables and methodologies ==
There are three main domestic league tables in the United Kingdom: the Complete University Guide (CUG), The Guardian, and The Times/The Sunday Times.

=== Complete University Guide ===
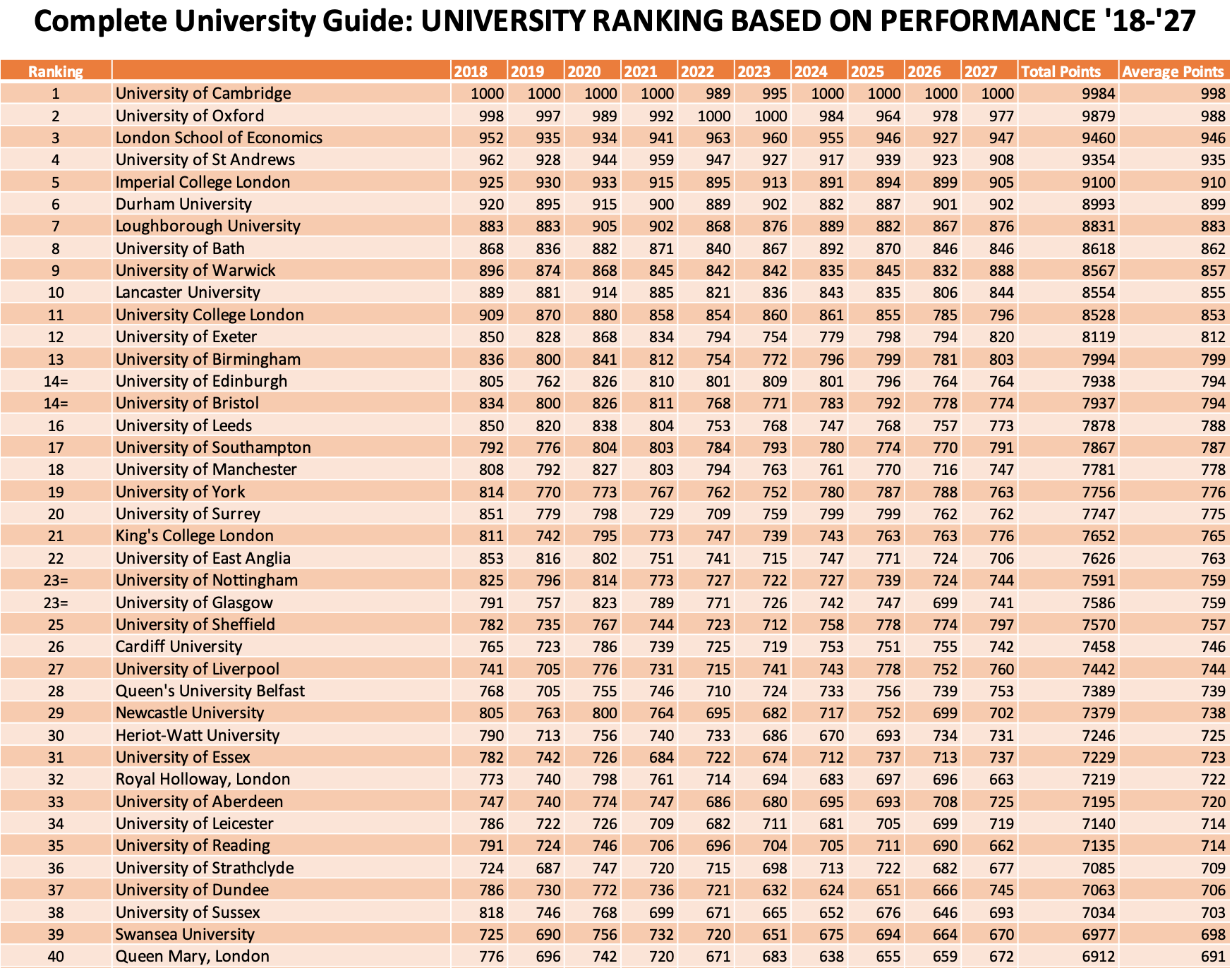
Top 40 universities based on the CUG's aggregated results over the past 10 years

The Complete University Guide was published for the first time in 2007.

The ranking relies on data collected by the UK government. It uses ten criteria, with a statistical technique called the Z-score applied to the results of each. The effect of this is to ensure that the weighting given to each criterion is not distorted by the choice of scale used to score that criterion. The ten Z-scores are then weighted (as given below) and summed to give a total score for each university. These total scores are then transformed to a scale where the top score is set at 1,000, with the remainder being a proportion of the top score. The ten criteria are:

- "Entry standards" (1.0) – average UCAS Tariff score of new students (data source: HESA);
- "Student satisfaction" (1.5) – a measure of the view of students on the teaching quality (data source: National Student Survey);
- "Research quality" (1.0) – a measure of the average quality of research – data source: Research Excellence Framework (REF);
- "Research intensity" (0.5) – a measure of the fraction of staff who are research-active (data source: HESA / REF);
- "Graduate prospects – outcomes" (0.67) – a measure of the employability of graduates (data source: Graduate Outcomes data from Higher Education Statistics Agency HESA);
- "Graduate prospects – on-track” (0.33) – a measure of whether graduates think their current activity is on track with their future plans (data source: Graduate Outcomes data from HESA);
- "Student–staff ratio" (1.0) – a measure of the average staffing level (data source: HESA);
- "Academic services spend" (0.5) – expenditure per student on all academic services (data source: HESA);
- "Facilities spend" (0.5) – expenditure per student on staff and student facilities (data source: HESA);
- "Continuation" (1.0) – a measure of the proportion of new entrants continuing to their second year (data source: HESA).

The Complete University Guide University League Table and separate Performing Arts Table use all ten criteria. The University League Table also adjusts several of the measures for subject mix, as is common across many university rankings.

The subject table rankings use six measures: entry standards, student satisfaction, research quality, continuation, and the two graduate prospects measures.

=== The Guardian ===
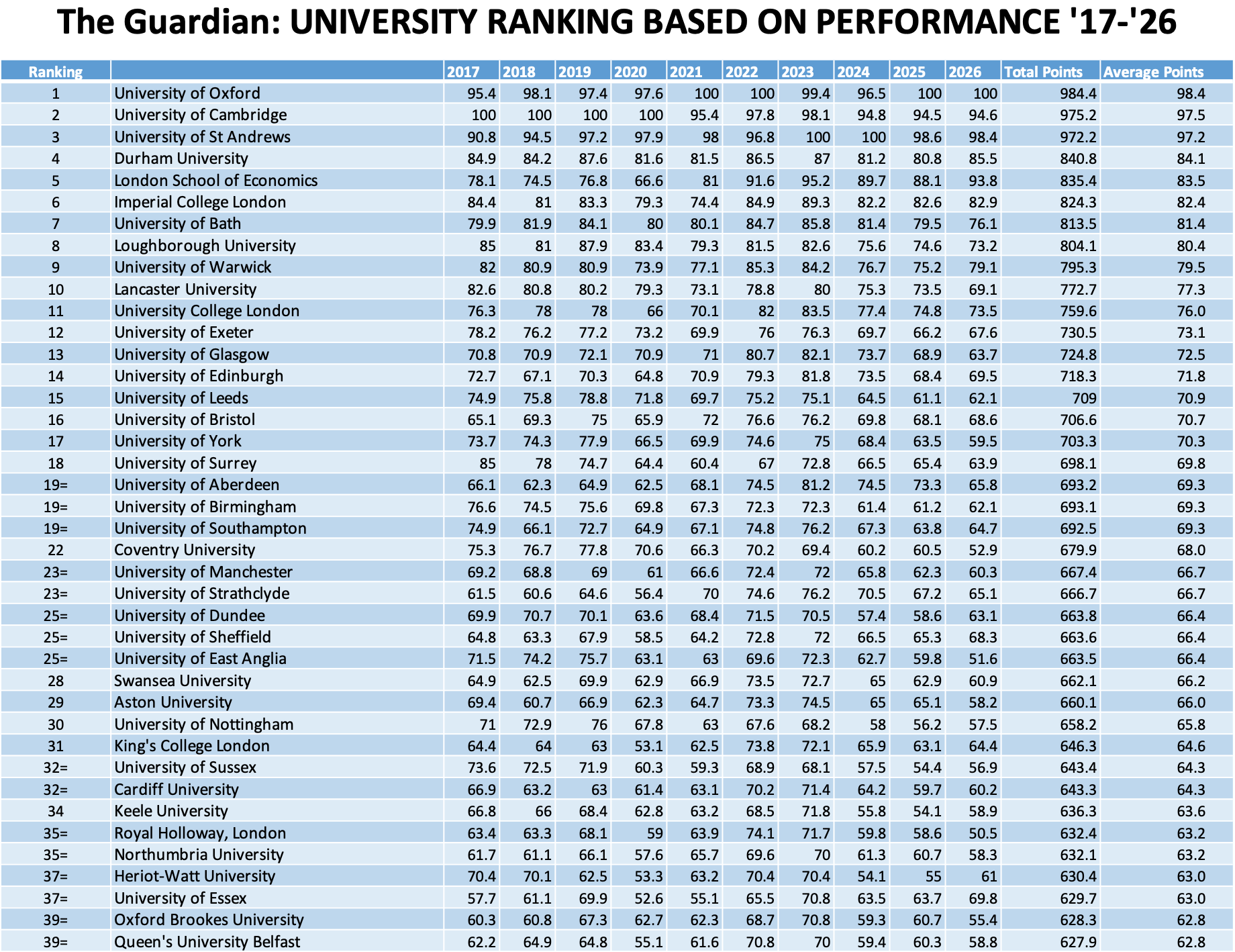
Top 40 universities based on The Guardian's aggregated results over the past 10 years

The Guardian's ranking uses nine different criteria, each weighted between 5 and 15 per cent. Unlike other annual rankings of British universities, the criteria do not include a measure of research output. A "value-added" factor is included which compares students' degree results with their entry qualifications, described by the newspaper as being "[b]ased upon a sophisticated indexing methodology that tracks students from enrolment to graduation, qualifications upon entry are compared with the award that a student receives at the end of their studies". Tables are drawn up for subjects, with the overall ranking being based on an average across the subjects rather than on institutional level statistics. The nine criteria are:

- "Entry scores" (15%);
- "Assessment and feedback" (10%) – as rated by graduates of the course (data source: National Student Survey);
- "Career prospects" (15%) (data source: Destination of Leavers from Higher Education);
- "Overall satisfaction" (5%) – final-year students' opinions about the overall quality of their course (data source: National Student Survey);
- "Expenditure per student" (5%);
- "Student-staff ratio" (15%);
- "Teaching" (10%) – as rated by graduates of the course (data source: the National Student Survey);
- "Value added" (15%);
- "Continuation" (10%).

=== The Times/The Sunday Times ===
The Times/The Sunday Times university league table, known as the Good University Guide, is published in both electronic and print format. Since 1999, the guide also recognises one university annually as University of the Year. It ranks institutions using the following eight criteria:

- "Student satisfaction (+50 to −55 points)" – the results of national student surveys are scored taking a theoretical minimum and maximum score of 50% and 90% respectively (data source: the National Student Survey);
- "Teaching excellence (250)" – defined as: subjects scoring at least 22/24 points, those ranked excellent, or those undertaken more recently in which there is confidence in academic standards and in which teaching and learning, student progression and learning resources have all been ranked commendable (data source: Quality Assurance Agency; Scottish Higher Education Funding Council; Higher Education Funding Council for Wales);
- "Heads'/peer assessments (100)" – school heads are asked to identify the highest-quality undergraduate provision (data source: The Sunday Times heads' survey and peer assessment);
- "Research quality (200)" – based upon the most recent Research Assessment Exercise (data source: Higher Education Funding Council for England (Hefce));
- "A-level/Higher points (250)" – nationally audited data for the subsequent academic year are used for league table calculations (data source: HESA);
- "Unemployment (100)" – the number of students assume to be unemployed six months after graduation is calculated as a percentage of the total number of known desbefore completing their courses is compared with the number expected to do so (the benchmark figure shown in brackets) (data source: Hefce, Performance Indicators in Higher Education).

Other criteria considered are:

- "Completion" – the percentage of students who manage to complete their degree;
- "Entry standards" – the average UCAS tariff score (data source: HESA);
- "Facilities spending" – the average expenditure per student on sports, careers services, health and counselling;
- "Good honours" – the percentage of students graduating with a first or 2.1;
- "Graduate prospects" – the percentage of UK graduates in graduate employment or further study (data source: HESA's survey of Destination of Leavers from Higher Education (DLHE));
- "Library and computing spending" – the average expenditure on library and computer services per student (data source: HESA);
- "Research" (data source: 2021 Research Excellence Framework);
- "Student satisfaction" (data source: National Student Survey); and
- "Student-staff ratio" (data source: HESA).

== Disparity with global rankings ==
It has been commented by The Sunday Times that a number of universities which regularly feature in the top ten of British university league tables, such as St Andrews, Durham and LSE (in the case of LSE 3rd to 4th nationally whilst only 101–150th in the ARWU Rankings / 56th in the QS Rankings / 37th in the THE Rankings), "inhabit surprisingly low ranks in the worldwide tables", whilst other universities such as Manchester, Edinburgh and KCL "that failed to do well in the domestic rankings have shone much brighter on the international stage". The considerable disparity in rankings has been attributed to the different methodology and purpose of global university rankings such as the Academic Ranking of World Universities, QS World University Rankings, and Times Higher Education World University Rankings. International university rankings primarily use criteria such as academic and employer surveys, the number of citations per faculty, the proportion of international staff and students and faculty and alumni prize winners. When size is taken into account, LSE ranks second in the world out of all small to medium-sized specialist institutions (after ENS Paris) and St Andrews ranks second in the world out of all small to medium-sized fully comprehensive universities (after Brown University) using metrics from the QS Intelligence Unit in 2015. The national rankings, on the other hand, give most weighting to the undergraduate student experience, taking account of teaching quality and learning resources, together with the quality of a university's intake, employment prospects, research quality and drop-out rates.

The disparity between national and international league tables has caused some institutions to offer public explanations for the difference. LSE for example states on its website that 'we remain concerned that all of the global rankings – by some way the most important for us, given our highly international orientation – suffer from inbuilt biases in favour of large multi-faculty universities with full STEM (Science, Technology, Engineering and Mathematics) offerings, and against small, specialist, mainly non-STEM universities such as LSE.'

Research by the UK's Higher Education Policy Institute (HEPI) in 2016 found that global rankings fundamentally measure research performance, with research-related measures accounting for over 85 percent of the weighting for both the Times Higher Education and QS rankings and 100 percent of the weighting for the ARWU ranking. HEPI also found that ARWU made no correction for the size of an institution. There were also concerns about the data quality and the reliability of reputation surveys. National rankings, while said to be "of varying validity", have more robust data and are "more highly regarded than international rankings".

=== British universities in global rankings ===
The following universities rank in the top 100 in at least two global rankings:

University	ARWU 2026 (Global)	QS 2027 (Global)	THE 2026 (Global)	# (Note: Number of times the university is ranked within the top 100 of one of the three global rankings)
University of Cambridge	4	6	3=	3 (Note: The university is ranked within the top 25 of all three global rankings.)
University of Oxford	7	4	1	3
University College London	17	8	22	3
Imperial College London	29	2	8	3 (Note: The university is ranked within the top 50 of all three global rankings.)
University of Edinburgh	38	35	29	3
University of Manchester	51	40	56	3
King's College London	67	37	38	3
University of Bristol	91	57	80=	3
London School of Economics	101–150	62	52	2
University of Birmingham	101–150	68	98=	2
University of Leeds	151–200	77	118	2

== Reception ==
=== Accuracy and neutrality ===
There has been criticism of attempts to combine different rankings on for example research quality, quality of teaching, drop out rates and student satisfaction. Sir Alan Wilson, former Vice-Chancellor of the University of Leeds, argues that the final average has little significance and is like trying to "combine apples and oranges". He also criticised the varying weights given to different factors, the need for universities to "chase" the rankings, the often fluctuating nature of a university's ranking, and the catch-22 that the government's desire to increase access can have negative effects on league table rankings. Further worries have been expressed regarding marketing strategies and propaganda used to chase tables, thus undermining universities' values.

The Guardian suggests that league tables may affect the nature of undergraduate admissions in an attempt to improve a university's league table position.

Roger Brown, the former Vice-Chancellor of Southampton Solent University, highlights perceived limitations in comparative data between Universities.

Writing in The Guardian, Professor Geoffrey Alderman makes the point that including the percentage of 'good honours' can encourage grade inflation so that league table position can be maintained.

The rankings are also criticised for not giving a full picture of higher education in the United Kingdom. There are institutions which focus on research and enjoy a prestigious reputation but are not shown in the table for various reasons. For example, the Institute of Education, University of London (now part of UCL), was not usually listed in the undergraduate rankings despite the fact that it offered an undergraduate BEd and was generally recognised as one of the best institutions offering teacher training and Education studies (for example, being given joint first place, alongside Oxford University, in the 2008 Research Assessment 'Education' subject rankings, according to both Times Higher Education and The Guardian).

The INORMS Research Evaluation Group have developed an initiative called More Than Our Rank which allows universities to describe in a narrative format their activities, achievements and ambitions not captured by any university ranking.

=== Benefits and uses ===
Authors writing about UK university league tables have argued that they increase transparency by making university performance data more accessible and easier to compare. In a higher education system with a large number of institutions, a 2018 report by the UK's Higher Education Policy Institute (HEPI) notes that rankings can serve as an initial guide for prospective students creating a shortlist of universities and courses. Subject-specific rankings can also draw attention to strengths in particular disciplines that may not be reflected in institutional reputation alone. In addition, rankings are used by universities and policymakers as a comparative benchmark and may contribute to greater institutional accountability through the publication and scrutiny of performance data. A Quality Assurance Agency (QAA) overview of UK university league tables describes the use of HESA data in UK league tables as a positive feature, noting that the underlying data is subject to rigorous validation, consistency and quality assurance procedures.

=== Full-time bias ===
League tables, which usually focus on the full-time undergraduate student experience, commonly omit reference to Birkbeck, University of London, and the Open University, both of which specialise in teaching part-time students. These universities, however, often make a strong showing in specialist league tables looking at research, teaching quality, and student satisfaction. In the 2008 Research Assessment Exercise, according to the Times Higher Education, Birkbeck was placed equal 33rd, and the Open University 43rd, out of 132 institutions. The 2009 student satisfaction survey placed the Open University 3rd and Birkbeck 13th out of 153 universities and higher education institutions (1st and 6th, respectively, among multi-faculty universities). In 2018, Birkbeck announced that it would withdraw from UK university rankings because their methodologies unfairly penalise it, since "despite having highly-rated teaching and research, other factors caused by its unique teaching model and unrelated to its performance push it significantly down the ratings".

== See also ==
- Armorial of British universities
- List of universities in the United Kingdom
