= Destination of Leavers from Higher Education =

Survey of college graduates

The Destinations of Leavers from Higher Education survey or DLHE was a statistical survey which aimed to contact UK and EU domiciled graduates from higher education (HE) programmes six months after qualifying from their HE course. Its aim was to establish what type of employment or further study they were engaged in, and their income, on one specific day in the survey period.

The survey was replaced in 2018 by the Graduate Outcomes survey undertaken by the Higher Education Statistics Agency.

Since 2008 the DLHE survey included directly funded HE students at Further Education Colleges (FECs) and has been conducted by International Graduate Insight Group (i-graduate). In this context the survey is also known as the Higher Education in Further Education Destinations of Leavers from Higher Education (HE in FE DLHE).

The results are often used by league tables of British universities compiled by newspapers. The newspapers purchase the data from HESA.

== Methodology ==
The survey took the form of a questionnaire and was conducted on-line, by telephone or by post. Target response rates were set to ensure that detailed data could be published and that the results of the survey genuinely reflected the outcomes for students leaving institutions.

A second stage of the survey called the DLHE Longitudinal survey aimed to find out what HE students had been doing, over a longer period of time, since completing their studies. The survey was completed around three and a half years after graduation.

== Impact of survey ==
As the survey is highly influential in certain league tables, some universities devote considerable effort into ensuring the best possible outcome within the regulations set by HESA. For example, the University of Exeter Careers and Employment Service Annual Report for 2004/2005 states

From the above, it can be seen that the DLHE Survey is not only a time consuming and complicated exercise but, when the league tables are published, it also has a considerable impact on the reputation of the institution. ... As a result of this interest in the destination of the students the survey for the 2005 leavers was conducted in a very thorough way, analysed each step of the process to ensure the best possible outcome whilst complying with the regulations laid down by HESA.

The document goes on to confirm that at this institution the telephone part of the survey was performed "by a team of student helpers who telephoned the graduates at home during the evenings and weekends".

Other universities, for example Plymouth, actively and publicly encourage participation making it clear that it affects the league table position of the students' alma mater. The Senate of The University of Manchester comments that "there was some evidence that actions by specific Schools to underline the importance of the DLHE Survey and to encourage participation had resulted in more positive results (e.g., Chemical Engineering)."
