= Lee Harvey (academic) =

Lee Harvey (born 1949) is a former director of the Centre for Research and Evaluation at Sheffield Hallam University.

In April, 2008 there was controversy as Harvey was suspended from his position by the UK's Higher Education Academy for writing a letter to the Times Higher Education that was critical of the National Student Survey. In May, 2008 he quit his post over the issue.

His work is in the field of higher education policy.

== Books ==
- Critical social research (1990), Lee Harvey, Unwim Hyman, ISBN 978-0-04-445360-4
- Transforming Higher Education (1996), Lee Harvey, Peter Knight, Peter T. Knight, Open Univ Pr, ISBN 978-0-335-19590-9
