= Higher Education Statistics Agency =

Higher education organisation

- Established: 1993
- Purpose: Higher education statistics in the UK
- Headquarters: Cheltenham, Gloucestershire, England
- Region served: United Kingdom
- Affiliations: Universities UK, GuildHE
- Website: www.hesa.ac.uk

The Higher Education Statistics Agency (HESA) was the official agency for the collection, analysis and dissemination of quantitative information about higher education in the United Kingdom. HESA became a directorate of Jisc after a merger in 2022.

HESA was set up by agreement between the relevant government departments, the higher education funding councils and the universities and colleges in 1993, following the White Paper "Higher Education: a new framework", which called for more coherence in HE statistics, and the Further and Higher Education Act 1992, which established an integrated higher education system throughout the United Kingdom. In 2018 HESA became the Designated Data Body for higher education in England under the Higher Education and Research Act 2017, with designation passing to Jisc after the 2022 merger.

== Data collections ==
HESA collected data from all publicly funded higher education institutions (HEIs) in the UK as well as a small number of private providers. The annual data collection streams were:

- Student data collection – information about students, courses and qualifications at HEIs
- AP Student data collection – information about students, courses and qualifications at Alternative Providers of higher education
- Staff data collection – information about staff employed by HEIs
- Finance record – income and expenditure of HEIs
- Graduate Outcomes – survey of graduate activities 15 months after leaving higher education
- Aggregate offshore record – count of students studying wholly overseas for UK HE qualifications
- HE Business and Community Interaction survey – information about interactions between HEIs and business and the wider community
- Estates management record – buildings, estates and environmental information about HEIs
- Initial Teacher Training (ITT) record
- Unistats collection
- Provider Profile collection
- Destinations of Leavers from Higher Education – survey of graduate activities six months after leaving HE (2002/03 to 2016/17)

== Statistical outputs ==
HESA published statistics and analyses based on the data it collects:

- Statistical Bulletins – Official Statistics outputs summarising each data stream
- Annual open data releases – detailed statistical tables
- Performance Indicators – comparative data on the performance of HEIs in widening participation, student retention, learning and teaching outcomes, research output and employment of graduates

Jisc processes HESA data to provide data extracts for research and publication by external users such as league tables of British universities.

== See also ==
- Department for Employment and Learning
- GuildHE
- Office for Students
- Higher Education Funding Council for Wales
- Jisc
- Quality Assurance Agency for Higher Education
- Scottish Funding Council
- Skills Funding Agency
- UCAS
- Universities UK
- Universities in the United Kingdom
- Universities' Statistical Record
