= Kingsbury High School =

Coordinates: 51.5896°N 0.2747°W

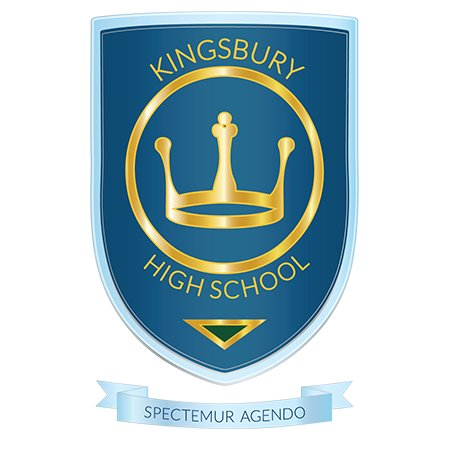

Location
- Princes Avenue (Upper School) Bacon Lane (Lower School); Kingsbury, London, NW9 9AT (Lower School) NW9 9JR (Upper School); United Kingdom

Information
- Type: Academy
- Motto: Latin: Spectemur agendo (Let us be judged by our actions)
- Established: 1925
- Local authority: Brent
- Department for Education URN: 137685 Tables
- Ofsted: Reports
- Chair of Governors: -
- Headteacher: Alex Thomas
- Gender: Mixed
- Age: 11 to 18
- Enrolment: 2036 (approx.)
- Former Pupils Known As: Old Kingsburians
- Head Boy: Dylan Patel
- Head Girl: Grace Ojumu
- Website: http://www.kingsburyhigh.org.uk/

Kingsbury High School is a large two-site high school with academy status in Kingsbury, London, England.

Kingsbury County Grammar School was established on 15 September 1925 as Kingsbury County School. Prior to the establishment of the school, the area had been served by a number of schools, which, in keeping with the future history of Kingsbury County School, had been subjected to the prevailing changes in population and politics of the area. Although there are reports of a school being kept in the area in c. 1530, by John Bishop the curate of Kingsbury, there is no more evidence until the nineteenth century of schooling in Kingsbury. Schooling is mentioned in 1819, and in 1822 a day school was opened. This school was situated near the junction of Kingsbury Road and Roe Green, which itself is looked upon by the current Kingsbury High School. This school was closed in 1876. Other schools existed in the area as well, with nearly all children in Kingsbury said to have attended one school or another in 1847. Kingsbury School Board was set up in 1875 following a damning report as to the cramped premises of the British School at the Hyde end of Kingsbury Road, itself an 1870 replacement of an infant's school that had been built in 1861 to the Congregational chapel in Edgware Road. Kingsbury Board School on Kingsbury Road, opened by the Kingsbury School Board in 1876, was to accommodate 130 pupils. In 1903 this became Kingsbury Council School. In 1922 this became the first senior mixed school in the area after its infants had been transferred to the new Kenton Lane Council School in 1922. This school operated as a junior school after 1928 until it was bombed in the Second World War.

== The establishment of Kingsbury County School ==
When Kingsbury County School was opened in 1925, it was originally housed in a building which once belonged to the Aircraft Manufacturing Company, (or Airco as it was also known) on the Edgware Road opposite Colindale Avenue (now a Jewish school). The building had been adapted to take 380 pupils. The first headmaster was Mr Tracy, who had a staff of eight teachers, five full-time and three part-time. As the population of the surrounding area increased owing to the influx of workers to the aircraft industry, so did the roll of the school, and in 1929 a new school was built in Princes Avenue by John Laing and Co. at a cost of cost £43,638.

== After the Butler Education Act of 1944 ==
When the United Kingdom Government passed the Butler Education Act in 1944 a Tripartite System was established dividing secondary schools into three categories, grammar schools, technical schools and secondary modern schools. The grammar school was deemed the place of education for the academically gifted (as determined by the 11-plus) and Kingsbury County School was selected to become the grammar school at which point the school changed its name to Kingsbury County Grammar School. The headmaster, Dr Payling (who had succeeded Mr Tracy after his retirement in 1949), saw the beginning of extensions in 1954.

At this point in time, Kingsbury was also being served by a second mixed secondary school, which was chosen to become the area's secondary modern school after the 1944 Act was passed. The increase in the population of Kingsbury had continued unabated and building had started on a second mixed secondary school at a site in Bacon Lane in 1939 but this was not finished, mainly due to constraints placed in the continuation of the building by the Second World War. In the meantime, Kingsbury Secondary Modern School began operating from the converted ex-Airco building, which had been vacated by Kingsbury County School in 1931. In 1952, what were to be Tyler's Croft county secondary schools, were opened as separate boys' and girls' secondary modern schools, and the pupils from the mixed Kingsbury Secondary Modern School were transferred to the new schools on Bacon Lane.

== Adoption of the comprehensive system ==
In 1967 with the local authority Brent Borough Council having adopted the comprehensive system of education, Kingsbury County Grammar and the two Tyler's Croft schools were amalgamated to form the giant Kingsbury High School.

Mr Jones, who had succeeded Dr Payling back in 1954, faced the task of managing the school's transition from being a grammar school to a comprehensive school. The Bacon Lane site was designated by the head as the Lower School under the management of a Head of Lower School, with the buildings of the former Kingsbury County Grammar to be used for the upper years. Three years after this huge reorganisation Mr Jones retired and the governors appointed Mr C. Mitchell in 1970. Mr Mitchell served 18 years as Headmaster and was responsible for a series of important developments. In Mr Mitchell's era, the ethnic makeup of Kingsbury began to change with the growth of a large Asian community. It already had significant numbers of black and Jewish pupils. In this time the school roll increased to 1750 and the proportion of ethnic minority children in the school increased apace. After Mr Mitchell retired in 1988, the former head of neighbouring Preston Manor High School, Philip Snell, was appointed to succeed as Headmaster.

== Grant maintained status and the growth of computing ==
In 1993 a majority of parents voted for the school to gain grant-maintained status which meant that the school was to benefit financially with an expanding budget and was also able to take control of its own admissions. During the subsequent period the school's reputation from computing also began to grow and flourish. This has been attributed largely to Mr Snell's interest in curricular advances and new information technology and the resultant building of the first computer-based Open Learning Centre in Princes Avenue with a special link for weather forecasting. When the Queen, chose the school for her launch of the royal web site, this both enhanced and highlighted the school's reputation for computing excellence.

Mr Snell retired in 2003 and was succeeded by the previous deputy head, Mr C. Chung, who, in common with a number of his predecessors, is a former teacher of the school. The school currently takes on more than 300 pupils a year culminating in just under 2,000 pupils (including sixth form).

The school became an academy on 14 February 2012.

== Ofsted rating ==
Since academising in 2012, Kingsbury High School has received two full inspections, in 2014 and 2024, as well as an interim assessment in 2013 and a short inspection in 2018. All of these inspections rated the school as Good, the second-highest of Ofsted's four possible ratings.

== 2026 stabbing ==
On 10 February 2026, two pupils were stabbed, the high school was then placed on lockdown. Both were taken to hospital, and a 13-year-old was arrested.

== School motto and badge ==
Kingsbury County School Badge

The school's motto, Spectemur agendo (meaning Let us be Judged by Our Actions) has remained consistent from the school's foundation being that of the original Kingsbury County School in 1925. The badge has altered over time although there are still elements of consistency. Both the original and current badges have a crown in the centre of the badge. The original badge had the crown sitting atop three drawn sabres arranged horizontally on top of each other, reducing in size from top to bottom. The current badge has the crown sitting atop a triangle which has replaced the sabres but is representative of the shape the sabres formed. The current badge has also lost the top portion of the original badge which represented two turrets of a battlement.

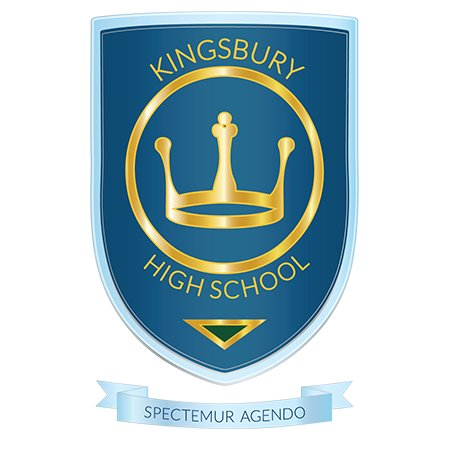
This is the current badge, updated in 2018. The colours have been slightly adjusted with a few colour refinements to make it look more modern.

== Notable alumni ==
Notable alumni of the school include:

- Dhiren Barot, terrorist, convicted terrorist for the organisation known as Al-Qaeda
- Mutya Buena, pop singer, founding member of Sugababes
- Keisha Buchanan, vocalist, founding member of Sugababes
- Ekow Eshun, journalist and broadcaster, former Artistic Director of the Institute of Contemporary Arts
- George Michael, singer, member of Wham!
- Courtney Pine, jazz saxophonist
- Floyd Steadman OBE and Deputy Lieutenant of Cornwall, captain of Saracens, first black captain of a major English rugby team
- Viven Rose, Lady Rose of Colmworth, Justice of the UK Supreme Court
- Malcolm Press, Vice-Chancellor of Manchester Metropolitan University

Notable alumni from the previous schools include:

- Shirley Eaton - actress
- Steve Nardelli - singer and songwriter The Syn
- Dennis H. Osborne -artist
- Julie Rogers - singer
- Charlie Watts, The Rolling Stones drummer
- William Woollard - TV producer and presenter
