= Business and Technology Education Council =

Provider of qualifications in England, Wales and Northern Ireland

The Business and Technology Education Council (BTEC) is a provider of secondary school leaving qualifications and further education qualifications in England, Wales and Northern Ireland. While the 'T' in BTEC stood for Technical, according to the DfE (2016) it now stands for Technology. BTECs originated in 1984 and were awarded by Edexcel from 1996. Their origins lie in the Business Education Council, formed in 1974 to "rationalise and improve the relevance of sub-degree vocational education". They are the responsibility of the Minister of State for Skills, Apprenticeships and Higher Education in the Department for Education.

A report by the Social Market Foundation in January 2018 found that more than a quarter (26%) of university applicants in England entered HE with at least one BTEC qualification. The research found that BTECs provide a particularly significant route to higher education for specific groups, with almost half students entering university with a BTEC, alongside large numbers of students in specific regions, including the North West, Yorkshire and the Humber, North East and West Midlands. This followed a separate report published by HEPI in 2017 on BTECs and higher education.

== Qualification subjects ==
Examples of qualifications include:

- Animal Management
- Applied Law
- Applied Science
- Applied Psychology
- Art & Design
- Business
- Computing
- Children's Care and Learning
- Creative Digital Media Production
- Early Years & Education
- Engineering
- Finance
- Forensic Science & Criminal Investigation
- Hair & Beauty
- Hospitality
- Health & Social Care
- Music / Music Technology
- Performing Arts
- Public Services
- Sports Science
- Travel & Tourism

== History ==
The BTEC Level 3 Extended Diploma dates back to the 1980s as a full-time three-year course. After the Haselgrave Report, the Business Education Council (BEC) and Technician Education Council (TEC) took over the accrediting of this qualification (called the "Ordinary National Diploma") and others in the stable, such as the National Certificate, Higher National Certificate and Higher National Diploma. The portfolio of courses was integrated when the BEC and TEC merged to form BTEC.

The BTEC (Business and Technology Education Council) was formed by the merger of the Business Education Council (BEC) and the Technical Education Council (TEC). The University of London Examinations & Assessment Council (ULEAC) and BTEC merged to form Edexcel.

== Awards and course system ==
=== University Level Awards (Level 6+) ===
The following Level 6, 7 or 8 courses are known as BTEC Strategic Awards. The qualification names for Level 6+ courses changed dependent on whether they were awarded through the forthcoming National Qualification Framework (NQF) or the predecessor Qualification Credit Framework (QCF) and represent University level awards:

RQF (2016)	QCF (2010)	Degree equivalence	Grading
BTEC Level 6 Extended Diploma	BTEC Level 6 Extended Diploma	Bachelors	PPP to D*D*D*
BTEC Level 6 Diploma	BTEC Level 6 Diploma	Bachelors	PP to D*D*
BTEC Level 7 Foundation Diploma	BTEC Level 7 90-Credit Diploma	Masters	Pass to Distinction*
BTEC Level 7 Extended Certificate	BTEC Level 7 Extended Certificate	Masters	Pass to Distinction*
BTEC Level 8 Certificate	BTEC Level 8 Certificate	PhD	Pass to Distinction*

=== School leaving qualification (Level 3) ===
The following Level 3 courses, known as BTEC National Diplomas, are intended for those with five or more GCSE grades A*-C including English, mathematics and science. The qualification names for Level 3 courses changed dependent on whether they were awarded through the forthcoming National Qualification Framework (NQF) or the predecessor Qualification Credit Framework (QCF):

RQF (2016)	QCF (2010)	A level size equivalence	Grading
BTEC Level 3 Extended Diploma	BTEC Level 3 Extended Diploma	3 x A levels	PPP to D*D*D*
BTEC Level 3 Diploma	BTEC Level 3 Diploma	2 x A levels	PP to D*D*
BTEC Level 3 Foundation Diploma	BTEC Level 3 90-Credit Diploma	1.5 x A levels	Pass to Distinction*
BTEC Level 3 Extended Certificate	BTEC Level 3 Subsidiary Diploma	1 x A level	Pass to Distinction*
BTEC Level 3 Certificate	BTEC Level 3 Certificate	0.5 x A level	Pass to Distinction*

=== School leaving qualification (Level 2) ===
The following Level 2 courses, known as BTEC Firsts, are intended for students at GCSE level as a vocational equivalent. There are no BTEC courses for English, or mathematics. Students who do not achieve the minimum Level 2 Pass grade will receive a Level 1 Pass in the given qualification equivalent to GCSE grades 3-1 and therefore does not count to the 9-4 measurement system. The qualification names for Level 2 courses changed dependent on whether they were awarded though the current National Qualification Framework (NQF) or the predecessor Qualification Credit Framework (QCF):

NQF (2012)	QCF (2010)	GCSE size equivalence	Grading
BTEC Level 2 Diploma	No equivalent	4 x GCSEs	PPP to D*D*D*
BTEC Level 2 Extended Certificate	BTEC Level 2 Diploma	3 x GCSEs	PPP to D*D*D*
BTEC Level 2 Certificate	BTEC Level 2 Extended Certificate	2 x GCSEs	PP to D*D*
BTEC Level 2 Award	BTEC Level 2 Certificate	1 x GCSE	Pass to Distinction*

== See also ==
- Institute for Apprenticeships and Technical Education
- Council for National Academic Awards
- National Vocational Qualification
