= Universities UK =

Advocacy organization for universities in the United Kingdom

- Formation: 1918
- Headquarters: London, United Kingdom
- Members: 141 universities, university colleges and other higher education providers recognised as universities
- President: Malcolm Press
- CEO: Vivienne Stern
- Website: universitiesuk.ac.uk

Universities UK (UUK) is an advocacy organisation for universities in the United Kingdom. It began life in the early 20th century through informal meetings of vice-chancellors of a number of universities and principals of university colleges and was previously known as the Committee of Vice-Chancellors and Principals of the Universities of the United Kingdom (CVCP). As of August 2025, UUK is led by President Malcolm Press, Vice-Chancellor of Manchester Metropolitan University, and Chief Executive Vivienne Stern. UUK is registered charity with an annual income of £13.7 million, which is largely raised from its member institutions.

== History ==
In 1918 the first consultative meeting of all vice-chancellors was held. At that time, the committee consisted of just twenty-two universities and university colleges. In 1930, under the chairmanship of Sir Charles Grant Robertson, vice-chancellors secured a mandate from their respective universities that "it is desirable in the common interests of the United Kingdom to constitute a Committee of Vice-Chancellors and Principals for purposes of mutual consultation".

In the early 1960s, working parties set up by the Committee of Vice-Chancellors and Principals were responsible for the creation of the Universities Central Council on Admissions (UCCA).

In the early 1980s, they commissioned the Jarratt report, published in 1985, and which framed universities as businesses delivering a product to student-consumers.

Over the succeeding years the number of universities increased as a result of new universities being created and the change in legislation in 1992, which recognised the former polytechnics as universities thus doubling and diversifying the membership.

On 1 December 2000, CVCP’s name, logo and identity were changed to Universities UK in order to reflect changes which had taken place in the organisation in recent years.

== Mission ==
Universities UK's task is to support the work of universities and promote their interests. Its mission is to help UK universities be the best in the world, through their research and teaching, and the positive impact they have locally, nationally and globally.

Universities Wales and Universities Scotland work autonomously as part of Universities UK, representing the interests of universities in Wales and Scotland. They campaign, influence and develop policy on behalf of the higher education sectors in the devolved nations.

== Admissions and social mobility ==
In 2013, Universities UK funded "Access for All", a report which supported work to widening access by promoting fair access and developing evidence to help universities learn from each other. It found that 34% of those who had achieved Key Stage 4 and expressed a motivation to go to university reported that the financial aspects of higher education, such as fees and living expenses, had made them think about not applying.

In 2019, Universities UK, in collaboration with the National Union of Students (NUS), published "Closing the Gap", which investigated attainment gaps between students of different ethnicities at UK universities. The report was led by Baroness Valerie Amos.

== Advice regarding segregation ==
In November 2013, Universities UK published the document "External speakers in higher education institutions" which provoked controversy because it suggested that audiences might be segregated by sex to satisfy the demands of ultra-orthodox religious speakers. The guidelines follow the principle that segregation is permissible if the Equality Act 2010 is followed and equal priority is given to all groups, in a manner similar to the former "separate but equal" doctrine in United States constitutional law that justified racial segregation until the Civil Rights Act of 1964. Following comments by Prime Minister David Cameron that universities should not enforce gender segregation on audiences, the case study which triggered this debate was withdrawn.

== Efficiency and effectiveness ==
The "Efficiency and effectiveness in higher education", a report by the Universities UK Efficiency and Modernisation Task Group chaired by Ian Diamond, launched in 2011. In response to the report, the "Efficiency Exchange" was set up to help higher education institutions to share ideas and good practice. The Exchange facilitates the sharing of resources.

== Health ==
Universities UK's health work programme addresses the NHS education reforms; research and innovation and AHSNs; healthcare employment and health education regulation. In 2012, "A picture of health and education" was published, which depicts the vital connections between higher education and healthcare.

== EU referendum ==
In July 2015, Universities UK launched a campaign in support of the UK's continuing membership of the EU, which generated wide media coverage. This was criticised by some Conservative and UKIP Members of the European Parliament, who said that such political activity undertaken by a registered charity which is largely state-funded was wrong.

== Transparency ==
In spring 2018, the transparency of Universities UK was widely called into question due to its role in negotiations over changes to the USS pension scheme, which led to the 2018 UK higher education strike. By 12 April 2018, 12,000 people had signed a petition demanding that Universities UK be made subject to the Freedom of Information Act 2000.

During the 2018 UK higher education strike many elements of Universities UK were subject to strong critique. Bill Cooke, a lecturer at York Management School, submitted a complaint to the Charity Commission in relation to the governance of Universities UK, arguing that: "UUK is lead adversary against tens of thousands of university lecturers and professional support staff. Yet its mission and Memorandum of Association claims that its purpose is to represent and speak for them and their interests, as member of universities." There were also criticisms of the miscommunications or misleading comments evident in various documents issued by Universities UK and its partner organisation Employers Pensions Forum, as well as analyses of the complex relationship that Universities UK has had with consultancy organisations.

== See also ==
- Armorial of UK universities
- List of universities in the United Kingdom
- Universities in the United Kingdom
