= Helen Connolly =

British Business woman

- Born: 1972 (age 53–54); United Kingdom
- Education: Manchester University
- Occupations: executive; Businesswoman
- Years active: 2016–
- Employer: New Look
- Title: Chief Executive Officer
- Term: June 2022
- Predecessor: Roger Wightman
- Successor: Incumbent

Helen Connolly (born December 1972) is a British businesswoman. She is the chief executive officer of New Look and was previously the chief executive officer of Bonmarché.

== Early life ==
She attended Manchester Metropolitan University, where she studied Clothing.

== Career ==
=== Dorothy Perkins ===
She worked for Dorothy Perkins as head of Buying from 2006 to 2008.

=== Asda ===
She worked for Asda from 2003 to 2006, and from 2008 to 2016.

=== Bonmarché ===
In August 2016 she became the chief executive of Bonmarché. The former chief executive became chief executive of Karen Millen. In December 2019, Connolly stepped down from her position.

=== New Look ===
In January 2020 she became the chief commercial officer for New Look, replacing Roger Wightman, who had worked for New Look for 30 Years.

Business positions
Preceded by Beth Butterwick	Chief Executive of Bonmarché; August 2016 -	Succeeded by Incumbent
