= Skills England =

Skills and Training agency in England

Agency overview
- Formed: 2025
- Type: Executive agency
- Jurisdiction: England
- Agency executives: Phil Smith, chair; Sir David Bell, vice chair
- Parent department: Department for Work and Pensions
- Website: https://www.gov.uk/government/organisations/skills-england

Skills England is an executive agency of the Department for Work and Pensions.

== History ==
Skills England was first proposed in the 2024 Labour Party manifesto. The main purpose of the agency was to increase flexibility within the skills training area, and to properly cater for skills shortages within regional economies. It would also use the apprenticeships levy more effectively. The stated ambitions were to build world class skills, enabling growth and opportunity, understand the nation’s skills needs and improve the skills offer, simplify access to skills to boost economic growth and to mobilise employers and other partners, co-creating solutions to meet national, regional and local skills needs. The main reason cited for the creation of Skills England was that between 2017 and 2022 skills shortages in the UK doubled to more than half a million, and accounted for 36% of job vacancies.

On 22 July 2024, Prime Minister Keir Starmer announced the creation of the body at the Farnborough Airshow, to be rolled out over the following nine months. Skills England was formally established on 2 June 2025 as an executive agency of the Department for Education. It assumed the functions transferred to the Secretary of State from the Institute for Apprenticeships and Technical Education.

In September 2025, the agency transferred to the Department for Work and Pensions, along with responsibility for apprenticeships, adult further education, skills, training and careers.
