= Julian Hibberd =

Julian Hibberd FRS
- Born: December 1969 (age 56)
- Education: Bangor University (BSc, PhD)
- Scientific career
- Fields: Plant Sciences
- Workplaces: University of Cambridge; University of Sheffield
- Thesis: Effects of elevated CO_{2} on biotrophic pathogens: powdery mildew of barley (1994)
- Doctoral advisor: John Farrar; Bob Whitbread
- Other academic advisors: Julie Scholes; Paul Quick; John C Gray; Malcolm Press
- Website: www.plantsci.cam.ac.uk/research/julianhibberd

Julian Michael Hibberd FRS (born December 1969) is a Professor of Photosynthesis at the University of Cambridge and a Fellow of Emmanuel College, Cambridge, England.

== Education ==
Hibberd was educated at Bangor University, Wales, where he was awarded an undergraduate degree in 1991 followed by a PhD in 1994. His PhD thesis investigated the effects of elevated carbon dioxide (CO_{2}) on powdery mildew in barley and was supervised by John Farrar and Bob Whitbread.

== Research and career ==
Following his PhD, Hibberd completed three years of postdoctoral research at the University of Sheffield, Yorkshire, with Paul Quick, Malcolm Press and Julie Scholes, investigating interactions between parasitic plants and their hosts. He moved to Cambridge to work with John C. Gray in 1997, and started his own group in 2000.

The Hibberd laboratory investigates the efficiency of the C_{4} photosynthetic pathway, with the aim of understanding its repeated evolution and also contributing to improving crop productivity. Hibberd's research has been funded by the Bill and Melinda Gates Foundation the Biotechnology and Biological Sciences Research Council (BBSRC), the FP7 program of the European Union, and the European Research Council (ERC).

Hibberd served as an associate editor of the scientific journal Plant Physiology from 2012 to 2022.

=== Awards and honours ===
In 2000 Hibberd was awarded a BBSRC David Phillips Fellowship to investigate the role of photosynthesis in veins of C3 plants. In 2005 he was awarded a President's medal by the Society for Experimental Biology, and in 2007 The Melvin Calvin Award by the International Society of Photosynthesis Research.

In 2008 Hibberd was named by the journal Nature as one of "Five crop researchers who could change the world" for his research that is attempting to replace C_{3} carbon fixation in rice with C_{4} carbon fixation. This would greatly increase the efficiency of photosynthesis and create a rice cultivar which could "have 50% more yield" which "would impact billions of people".

Hibberd was elected a Fellow of the Royal Society (FRS) and also member of the European Molecular Biology Organisation (EMBO) in 2025.
