= Fiona Kendrick =

British businesswoman (born 1955)

Fiona Kendrick DBE
- Born: 5 May 1955 (age 71)
- Occupation: Businessman
- Title: Former CEO and Chairman, Nestlé UK & Ireland
- Board member of: Institute for Apprenticeships and Technical Education
- Spouse: Married
- Children: 2 sons

Dame Fiona Marie Kendrick, DBE (born 5 May 1955) is the former chairman and chief executive of Nestlé UK & Ireland, the manufacturers of Kit Kat. Nestlé UK & Ireland has a turnover of around £2.7bn, with 8,000 employees over 23 sites.

== Early life and education ==
Kendrick was brought up in Hereford. Her father was Irish and her mother English. She has an older sister, who is a retired headmistress in Sheffield.

She began her career for two years as a biology and chemistry teacher.

== Career ==
Kendrick joined Nestlé UK in January 1980 in the frozen food section. She became the first female chief executive of Nestlé UK in October 2012, being announced in August 2012. Nestlé UK has its headquarters at City Place Gatwick, off the A23 to the southeast of Gatwick Airport. She is a UK Commissioner for Employment and Skills.

In July 2017, Kendrick stood down as CEO (but continued as chairman), and was succeeded by Stefano Agostini, who had been CEO of Nestle Waters Italy. She retired as chairman in December 2018.

She joined the Food and Drink Sector Council, a government organisation formed in January 2018. She was the chairman of the board of trustees of the New Model Institute for Technology and Engineering (NMITE) in Hereford from April 2017 until 2021. She is on the board of directors of the Institute for Apprenticeships and Technical Education. She is now chair of Price Waterhouse Public Interest Body.

== Personal life ==
In January 2015 she was awarded a damehood in the 2015 New Year Honours. She lives in Tadworth in east Surrey. She is involved with the charity Speakers for Schools. In 2015, she received an honorary doctorate from Sheffield Hallam University. This was followed by an honorary doctorate in 2017 from University of York and one from University of Warwick in 2019. She is married to a graphic designer who used to run his own business, and they have two sons.

Business positions
Preceded by Paul Grimwood	Chief Executive of Nestlé UK & I October 2012 - June 2017	Succeeded by Stefano Agostini
Preceded by Paul Grimwood	Chairman of Nestlé UK & I October 2012 - December 2018	Succeeded by
Preceded by	Managing Director of Nestlé UK (Food & Beverage Division); August 2001 - January 2008	Succeeded by
Cultural offices
Preceded by Richard Evans	President of the Food and Drink Federation; January 2015- January 2017	Succeeded by Gavin Darby
