= Malcolm Press =

British ecologist (born 1958)

Malcolm Press CBE DL
- Born: Malcolm Colin Press; 18 September 1958 (age 68)
- Education: Kingsbury High School
- Alma mater: Westfield College, London (BSc); University of Manchester (PhD)
- Awards: BES presidents Medal (2005)
- Scientific career
- Fields: Ecology; Ecophysiology; Parasitic plants
- Workplaces: Manchester Metropolitan University; Universities UK; University of Birmingham; Royal Botanic Gardens, Kew; Institute for Apprenticeships and Technical Education; British Council; UCAS; National Trust; World Wide Fund for Nature; British Ecological Society; University College London; University of Manchester; University of Sheffield
- Thesis: Responses to acidic deposition in blanket bogs (1983)
- Doctoral advisor: John A. Lee
- Notable students: Julian Hibberd (postdoc)
- Website: mmu.ac.uk/about-us/our-people/vice-chancellor

Malcolm Colin Press CBE DL (born 18 September 1958) is a British ecologist, professor and Vice-Chancellor of Manchester Metropolitan University, in the United Kingdom. Press is also President of Universities UK.

Press is the President of Universities UK and a trustee of British Council and English National Opera. Press was appointed a Commander of the British Empire (CBE) in 2022.

== Education ==
Press was educated at Kingsbury High School. He studied environmental science at Westfield College, part of the University of London gaining a Bachelor of Science degree in 1980 followed by a PhD from the University of Manchester in 1984 supervised by John A. Lee. In 2008, he was awarded a Diploma in Spanish and Latin American studies from the University of Sheffield.

== Career ==
Following his PhD, Press was a postdoctoral research associate at University College London (UCL) from 1985 to 1989. He was appointed a lecturer in 1989 at the University of Manchester and promoted to senior lecturer in 1992.

=== Service and leadership ===
Press moved to the University of Sheffield in 1994, where he served as a reader until 1998, then professor of physiological ecology, where he also served as head of the department of animal and plant sciences from 2002.

He was appointed Pro-Vice-Chancellor (PVC) and head of the college of life and environmental sciences at the University of Birmingham in 2008. Press faced pushback from the University and College Union (UCU), which held a successful ballot for strike action following introduction of business performance management measures to support university staff. Following constructive negotiations, the strike was later called off after negotiations and Press noted that his statements in a public strategy document "could have been more clearly and sensitively articulated"..

From 2013 he served as Birmingham's Pro-Vice-Chancellor for research and knowledge transfer.

Press was appointed Vice-Chancellor of the Manchester Metropolitan University in June 2015 where he took over from John Brooks who held the post from 2005 to 2015.

Press served as president of the British Ecological Society from 2007 to 2009, and was awarded the BES president's medal in 2005. From 2009 to 2012, he served as a member of the council of the National Trust. Between 2012 and 2018, he served on the Board of Trustees at the Royal Botanic Gardens, Kew, appointed by John Taylor, Baron Taylor of Holbeach. From 2015 until 2021 he was a trustee of the World Wide Fund for Nature. In 2017, he was appointed chair of the Manchester Memorial Advisory Group, serving until 2020. In 2020, he was appointed a trustee of the British Council. Press also sits on the boards of several university-linked businesses, including UCAS, the Institute for Apprenticeships and Technical Education. and the Oxford Road Corridor. Press is a trustee of the President of Universities UK and British Council and English National Opera. Press was made a commander of the British Empire in 2022.

=== Research ===
Press is internationally recognised as a researcher in the fields of sustainable agriculture, climate change and tropical forests. Highlights include:

- Impacts of atmospheric nitrogen deposition on upland vegetation (Sphagnum): his PhD was the first demonstration of the impact of pollutant nitrogen (nitrates and ammonium) on a British terrestrial ecosystem.
- Impacts of climate change on terrestrial Arctic ecosystems: community changes to temperature and nutrients are driven by the response of key species and their interactions.
- Interactions between parasitic plants and their cereal hosts in sub-Saharan Africa: control and mechanisms of tolerance and resistance.
- Impacts of parasitic plants on ecosystem structure and function: hemiparasites are keystone species and ecosystem engineers, shaping community structure through impacts on decomposition and nutrient cycling.
- Factors that control the regeneration of dipterocarp seedlings in Southeast Asian tropical rainforests.

=== Reception ===
Press was appointed Commander of the Order of the British Empire (CBE) in the 2022 New Year Honours for "services to higher and technical education". He was appointed a Deputy Lieutenant (DL) of Greater Manchester in 2024.

In September 2026, Press was criticised by the University and College Union for appearing at a Reform UK conference. Press was on a panel discussing education alongside Suella Braverman. In response, Press emphasised that 'engagement should not be confused with endorsement' and 'we must be willing to listen, question, debate and disagree, rather than simply engaging with those whose views we may already share'.

Academic offices
Preceded by John Brooks	Vice-Chancellor of Manchester Metropolitan University; 2015–present	Incumbent
