= Antony Jenkins =

British business executive (born 1961)

Antony Jenkins CBE
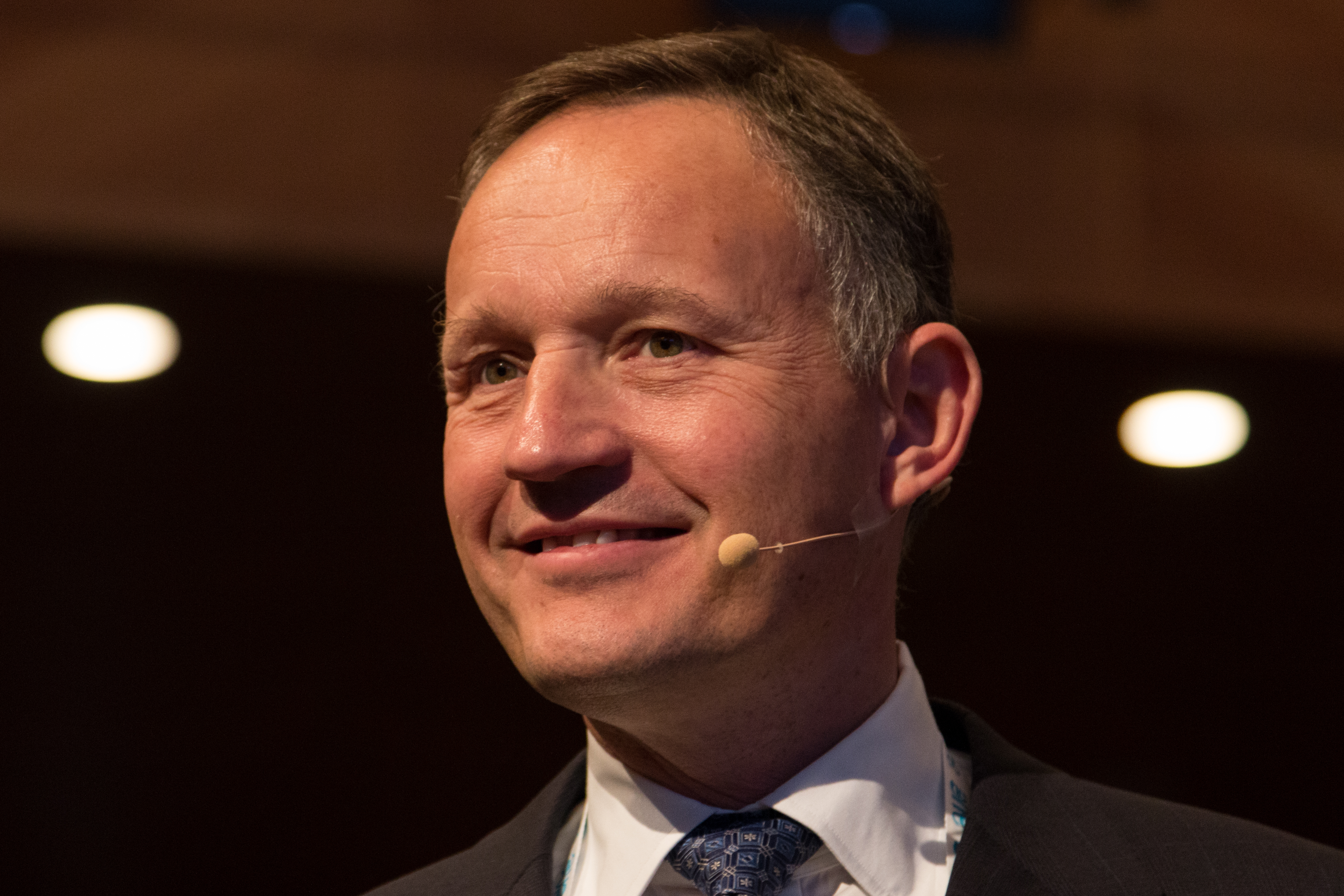
- Jenkins in 2014
- Born: Antony Peter Jenkins; 11 July 1961 (age 65); Blackburn, UK
- Education: Malbank School and Sixth Form College
- Alma mater: University of Oxford (BA); Cranfield School of Management (MBA)
- Occupation: Banker
- Years active: 1982–
- Employer(s): Barclays; Citigroup
- Title: CEO, 10x Future Technologies
- Board member of: Institute for Apprenticeships and Technical Education
- Spouse: Amanda Mary Benson (m. 1984)
- Children: 2

Antony Peter Jenkins CBE (born 11 July 1961) is a British business executive. Since 2016 he has been the chief executive officer of 10x Future Technologies, which he founded. He was the group chief executive of Barclays from August 2012 until July 2015. Jenkins is the current Chancellor of Manchester Metropolitan University.

== Early life and education ==
Jenkins was born in Blackburn, grew up in Stoke-on-Trent, and was educated at Malbank School and Sixth Form College. He studied Philosophy, Politics and Economics (PPE) at the University of Oxford, and was an undergraduate student at University College, Oxford graduating in 1982. He continued his studies in the Cranfield School of Management at Cranfield University gaining a Master of Business Administration (MBA) degree in 1988.

== Career ==
Jenkins began his career in finance at Barclays as a graduate in 1983, but subsequently moved to Citigroup where he was promoted to lead the company's branded credit card business. In 2006, he returned to Barclays to take over the company's Barclaycard division. In 2009, Jenkins was promoted to chief executive of the retail and business banking group and asked to join the executive committee.

Jenkins was appointed as Barclays' group chief executive on 30 August 2012. In February 2014, he announced he would be declining his bonus for 2013 following a series of scandals. On 8 July 2015 it was announced that he had been sacked by Barclays after a dispute with the board over the size of the investment bank and the pace of cost cutting. Barclays' deputy chairman Sir Michael Rake said a "new set of skills" was required at the head of the group.

In 2016, Jenkins launched 10x Future Technologies, a Fintech company based in London.

=== Service and leadership ===
Jenkins served on the board of Visa Europe Ltd from 2008 until 2011. He is a member of the steering group for the Big Innovation Centre – an initiative of the Work Foundation and Lancaster University. He is also closely involved with a number of charitable institutions as well and is a Patron for Government Employee Engagement.

Jenkins is a One Young World counsellor, speaking to One Young World delegates about responsible capitalism at Summits in Zurich, Switzerland in 2011, Pittsburgh, United States in 2012, Johannesburg, South Africa in 2013 and Dublin, Ireland in 2014.

In June 2016 he was appointed shadow chair of the Institute for Apprenticeships and Technical Education by the Department for Business, Innovation and Skills, prior to its formal operational start in 2017, he held the chairmanship until 2019.

=== Awards and honours ===
Jenkins was appointed Commander of the Order of the British Empire (CBE) in the 2021 Birthday Honours for services to business in his role as chair of the Institute for Apprenticeships and Technical Education.

== Personal life ==
Jenkins met his wife, Amanda Benson, during university and they married in 1984. The couple have two children. He is an ardent music lover who says he listens to rock, jazz, or classical music.

Business positions
Preceded by Bob Diamond	Group Chief Executive of Barclays plc 30 August 2012 – 8 July 2015	Succeeded by Jes Staley
