= Ekow Eshun =

British writer (born 1968)

Ekow Eshun OBE FRSL
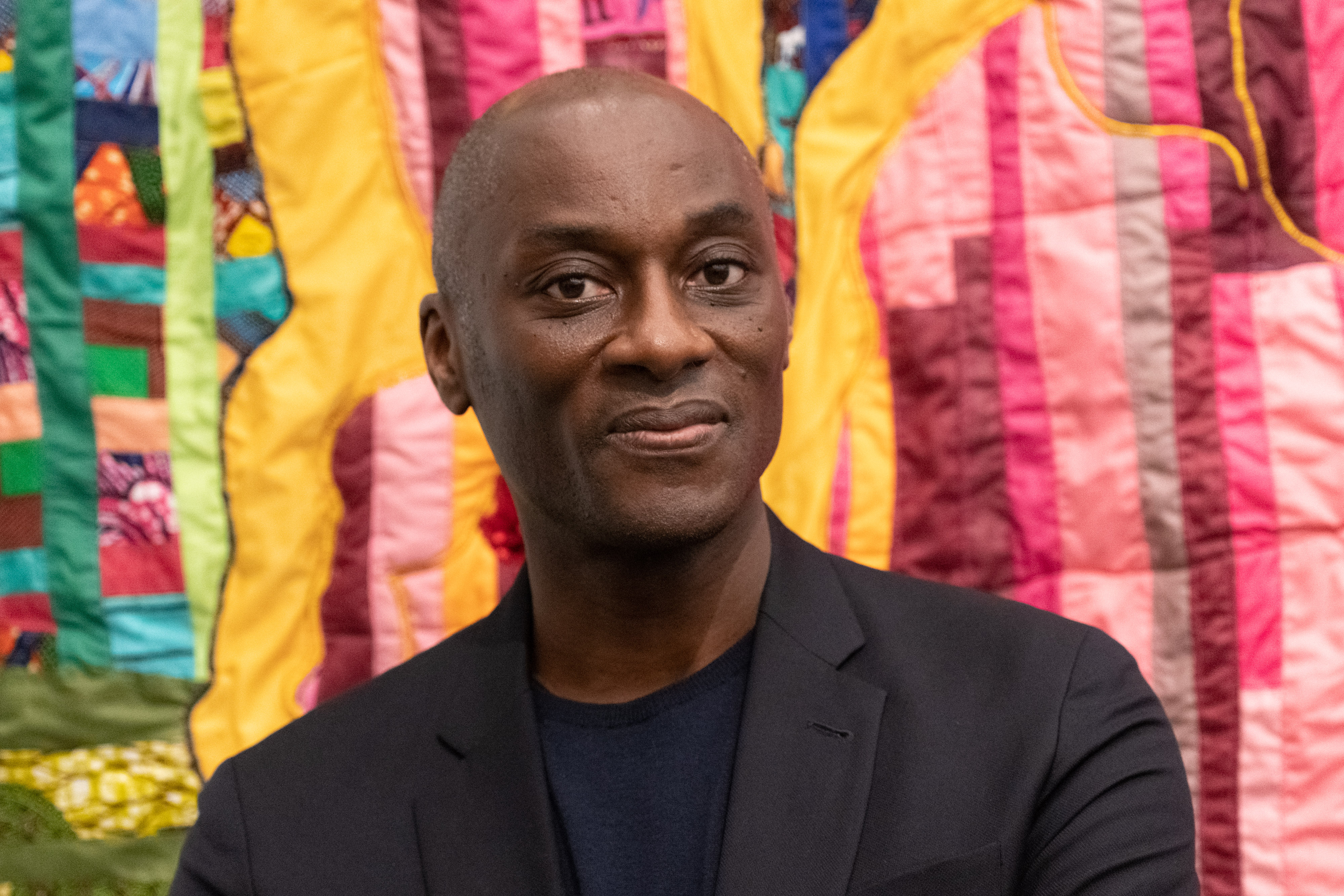
- Born: 27 May 1968 (age 58); London, England
- Education: Kingsbury High School; London School of Economics
- Occupations: Writer, broadcaster, curator
- Known for: Cultural commentary
- Website: ekoweshun.co.uk

Ekow Eshun OBE FRSL (born 27 May 1968) is a British writer, broadcaster, and curator. He was the first black editor of a major magazine in the UK (Arena Magazine in 1997) and was also the first black director of a major arts organisation, the Institute of Contemporary Arts (ICA) in London. Described as a "cultural polymath" by The Guardian, he has authored books, presented TV and radio documentaries, curated exhibitions, and chaired lectures.

Eshun curated the In the Black Fantastic at London's Hayward Gallery in July 2022, an exhibition of black artists exploring myth, science fiction and Afrofuturism. The show met with a positive reception, being called "Spectacular from first to last" by The Observer. The Evening Standard said: "There is "There is unlikely to be a much better show this year." Eshun is the Chairman of the Fourth Plinth Commissioning Group in Trafalgar Square.

== Biography ==
Ekow Eshun was born in London, England. His family are Fante from Ghana. His father was a supporter of Kwame Nkrumah and was working at the Ghanaian High Commission in London when Nkrumah was overthrown in a military–police coup in February 1966.

Although three years (1971–74) of Eshun's childhood were spent in Accra, for the most part, he was brought up in Kingsbury, North West London. He attended Kingsbury High School in North West London, later reading history and politics at the London School of Economics (LSE). During his time at LSE, he edited both Features and Arts for the student newspaper The Beaver.

Eshun was the director of the Institute of Contemporary Arts in London from 2005 to 2010, during a period of immense turmoil for the organisation. Under his directorship, attendance figures ascended by 38 per cent from 350,000 to 470,000, and two young artists shown in ICA galleries, Enrico David and Mark Leckey, went on to be nominated for the Turner Prize.

Eshun has appeared as a critic on Saturday Review on BBC Radio 4 and also formerly on BBC Two's The Review Show. He appeared in 2009 in the television advertisements for Aviva (formerly Norwich Union). He has also often appeared on More4's topical talk show The Last Word. In 2019, he was the captain of the London School of Economics team on Christmas University Challenge. In October 2021, he wrote and presented White Mischief, a three-part documentary on BBC Radio 4 on the history of whiteness.

Eshun's memoir, Black Gold of the Sun: Searching for Home in England and Africa, published in 2005, deals with a return trip to Ghana, Ghanaian history, and matters of identity and race. Black Gold of the Sun was nominated for an Orwell Prize in 2006.

He is the younger brother of the author Kodwo Eshun.

== Curator ==
Since 2015, Ekow Eshun has worked as an independent curator. His shows, held across the world, focus on themes of race and identity.

=== The Time Is Always Now ===
The Time is Always Now is a show curated by Eshun for the National Portrait Gallery, opening in February 2024.

=== In the Black Fantastic ===
Eshun curated In the Black Fantastic at the Hayward Gallery in London in July 2022, an exhibition of black artists exploring myth, science fiction and Afrofuturism. The show was critically acclaimed, being called "Spectacular from first to last" by The Observer. The Evening Standard said: "There is unlikely to be a better show this year."

To accompany his book and exhibition, In the Black Fantastic, Eshun curated a season of visionary films exploring black existence through sci-fi, myth and Afrofuturism at the British Film Institute.

=== We Are History ===
We Are History, was a group exhibition, curated by Eshun, at Somerset House in London. The exhibition won Time Out London's Sustainable Event of the Year prize in 2021.

=== Africa State of Mind ===
Africa State of Mind, was a survey show heralding a new era in African photography. It first opened at New Art Exchange in Nottingham, before touring to MOAD San Francisco, 2020, and Rencontres des Arles, 2021. Africa State of Mind was also a book of African photography that Ekow Eshun published with Thames and Hudson.

=== Made You Look ===
Made You Look at The Photographers' Gallery in London was a group show on photography, style and Black dandyism. Describing this exhibition in Wallpaper magazine, Eshun said: "It is about confounding expectations about how black men should look or carry themselves in order to establish a place of personal freedom; a place beyond the white gaze, where the black body is a site of liberation not oppression."

== Writer ==
=== Creative non-fiction ===
Eshun's memoir, Black Gold of the Sun: Searching for Home in England and Africa, published in 2005, deals with a return trip to Ghana, Ghanaian history, and matters of identity and race. Reviewing the book for the New Statesman, Margaret Busby said: "His rich memoir, which comes fittingly adorned with a golden jacket designed by Chris Ofili, attempts to answer the question: 'Where are you from?' Eshun's search for home and identity is sometimes achingly poignant, a story of semi-detachment, of fragmentation and duality, which must have been cathartic to write. 'There is no singularity to truth' is its refrain." Black Gold of the Sun was nominated for an Orwell Prize in 2006.

British publishing house Hamish Hamilton has acquired the rights to Eshun’s new book The Stranger, described as a “‘powerfully intimate, richly imagined’ investigation into Black masculinity.”

=== Art books ===
In the Black Fantastic is a book that assembles art and imagery from across the African diaspora that embraces ideas of the mythic and the speculative. The book includes an introductory text by Eshun, and extended essays by Eshun, Kameelah L. Martin and Michelle D. Commander.

Africa State of Mind is a survey of scenes in contemporary African photography, and an introduction to the creative figures who are making it happen.

Eshun has contributed essays to major art publications. He wrote an essay for Seeing by Duro Olowu. Eshun focuses on Olowu's role within Britain’s black and Afro-Caribbean creative community. He is also a contributor to Fashioning masculinities : the art of menswear. which accompanied an exhibition at the London museum The V&A.

=== Journalism and cultural commentary ===
Eshun writes for publications including The New York Times, The Financial Times and The Guardian, and has been a contributing editor at Wallpaper. For example, he wrote about Basquiat for The New York Times in 2017.

As the assistant editor of style magazine The Face, and then editor of Arena men's magazine, Eshun has written thought pieces exploring style, masculinity, race and the changing face of modern Britain, and has interviewed figures such as Prince, Bjork, Neneh Cherry and Hilary Mantel. In early autumn 1996, Eshun interviewed Prince at his Paisley Park complex outside Minneapolis.

== Broadcaster ==
=== Dark Matter: A History of the Afrofuture (BBC4, 2022) ===
Presented by Eshun, the film Dark Matter: A History of the Afrofuture (BBC4, 2022) is an exploration – from Jean-Michel Basquiat to Grace Jones – of how black artists use the sci-fi genre to examine black history and imagine new, alternative futures.

=== White Mischief (BBC Radio 4, 2021) ===
In White Mischief, a three-part radio series for BBC Radio 4, Eshun traces where whiteness came from and how its power has remained elusive.

- Episode 1: The background hum
- Episode 2: Kind of nightmarish
- Episode 3: Dream for a moment

=== Exploring the Black Atlantic (Tate, 2021) ===
In this four-part mini-series, Eshun examines the ways in which artists have engaged with the concept of the "Black Atlantic".

== Honours and recognition ==
Eshun was elected a Fellow of the Royal Society of Literature (FRSL) in 2025. He was appointed a Officer of the Order of the British Empire (OBE) in the 2026 New Year Honours.

== Works ==
Books

- In the Black Fantastic, Thames and Hudson, 2022.
- Africa State of Mind: Contemporary Photography Reimagines a Continent, Thames and Hudson, 2020.
- Black Gold of the Sun: Searching for home in England and Africa, Hamish Hamilton, 2005.

Selected essays

- "'I Suck at Love': Nas, Jay-Z and Black Male Vulnerability", in The Culture: Hip Hop & Contemporary Art in the 21st Century, Asma Naeem, 2023.
- The New African Portraiture, in The New African Portraiture: Shariat Collections, Walther & Franz König, 2023.
- "The Hybrid of it all: The Making of Black British Style", in Fashioning Masculinities: The Art of Menswear, V&A, 2022.
- A Conversation between Campbell Addy and Ekow Eshun, in Feeling Seen: The Photographs of Campbell Addy, Prestel, 2022.
- "Why do we March? Joy Gerrard’s Exhilarating Bodies in Motion", in Joy Gerrard: Precarious Freedom: Crowds, Flags, Barriers, Highlanes Gallery, 2022.
- "Acts of Rememory", in Mark Bradford: Agora, Serralves, 2021
- "Portmanteau Biota", in Hurvin Anderson: Reverb, Thomas Dane, 2021.
- "Masterless People: The Free Republic of Raphaël Barontini", in Raphaël Barontini, Marianne Ibrahim Publications, 2021
- "Black is Ours", in Amoako Boafo, Marianne Ibrahim Publications, 2021.
- "Duro Oluwo and the Becoming of Black Britain", in Duro Olowu: Seeing, Prestel, 2020.
- *Ways of Seeing: African Portraiture Looks Back at the Imperial Eye", in Masculinities: Liberation through Photography, Prestel, 2020.
- "Every Moment Counts", in Linda McCartney. The Polaroid Diaries, Taschen, 2019.
- "To make figures and subjects walk into a frame": John Akomfrah in conversation with Ekow Eshun, in John Akomfrah: Purple, Barbican, 2017
- "Like Tulips in the Sun: Colonisation and Creolisation in the World Stage": Jamaica, in Kehinde Wiley: The World Stage: Jamaica, Stephen Friedman, 2013.
- Ekow Eshun Interviews Chris Ofili, in Chris Ofili, Tate, 2010
