= Jarratt report =

Report into higher education in the UK

The Jarratt report was an inquiry into British higher education published in 1985. While delivered during the Thatcher era, it was commissioned by the Committee of Vice-Chancellors and Principals. The report viewed Universities as enterprises not unlike a factory, and in which students were the customer. Concomitantly, academics were viewed less as a self-governing group seeking to expand knowledge and more as shop-floor deliverers of education, subject to performance indicators. Organizational-functions, similarly, were viewed as need dedicated managers, with transfer of these roles from academics to these managers. The adoption of the report led to the abolition of academic tenure. It has been argued that the report thus laid the ground for the increase of managerialism in the academy. In a personal view, Geoffrey Sampson argued that since the report it has become explicit State policy that university staff are paid to help their employers compete against sister institutions, rather than to serve wider ends.
