= Institute for Apprenticeships and Technical Education =

Non-departmental government body in the United Kingdom

Institute for Apprenticeships and Technical Education (IfATE)
- Abbreviation: IfATE
- Formation: 2017; 9 years ago
- Dissolved: 2025; 1 year ago
- Type: Crown status non-departmental public body
- Region served: United Kingdom
- Key people: Baroness Ruby McGregor-Smith; Jennifer Coupland; Dr Kate Barclay; Bev Robinson; Dame Fiona Kendrick; Bev Robinson; Sir Robin Millar; Professor Malcolm Press; Sir Peter Estlin; Neil Morrison; Jane Hadfield; Mark McClennon
- Parent organization: Department for Education
- Website: www.instituteforapprenticeships.org

The Institute for Apprenticeships and Technical Education (IfATE) was an employer led organisation that helped shape technical education and apprenticeships in the United Kingdom. They did so by developing, reviewing and revising occupational standards that form the basis of apprenticeships and qualifications such as T Levels. Post 16 and Higher Technical Qualifications (HTQs). It was funded by the Department for Education of the Government of the United Kingdom.

In 2024, Prime Minister Keir Starmer announced that Skills England would take over the function of IfATE, over the course of nine months. On 1 June 2025 IfATE was abolished and on 2 June 2025 Skills England was formally established as an executive agency.

== Purpose ==
IfATE worked with employers to identify skills gaps in their sectors. They collaborated with employers to develop and revise occupational standards to match the skills requirements of the sector. IfATE also regulated and licensed bodies, such as further education colleges, to provide qualifications for apprenticeships in England. It was formed in April 2017 under the Technical and Further Education Act 2017 following on from the Apprenticeships, Skills, Children and Learning Act 2009 and work of the National Apprenticeship Service. IfATE was a non-departmental public body of the Department for Education (DfE). On 1 June 2025 IfATE was abolished.

== Governance ==
As of 2024 the IfATE board of directors included:

- Ruby McGregor-Smith
- Jennifer Coupland (chief executive)
- Dr Kate Barclay
- Bev Robinson
- Fiona Kendrick
- Robin Millar
- Malcolm Press
- Peter Estlin
- Neil Morrison
- Jane Hadfield
- Mark McClennon

Previous board members include Gerald Berragan, Antony Jenkins, Toby Peyton-Jones, Jessica Leigh Jones and John Cope.

== Abolition ==
Institute for Apprenticeships and Technical Education (Transfer of Functions etc) Act 2025 (Note: Section 13.)
- Act of Parliament
- Parliament of the United Kingdom
- Long title: An Act to transfer the functions of the Institute for Apprenticeships and Technical Education, and its property, rights and liabilities, to the Secretary of State; to abolish the Institute; and to make amendments relating to the transferred functions.
- Citation: 2025 c. 14
- Territorial extent: England and Wales (Note: Section 11.)

Dates
- Royal assent: 15 May 2025
- Commencement: 15 May 2025 (in part); 1 June 2025 (rest of act) (Note: The Institute for Apprenticeships and Technical Education (Transfer of Functions etc) Act 2025 (Commencement) Regulations 2025 (SI 2025/598).); (Note: Section 12.)
Other legislation
Amends	Superannuation Act 1972; Freedom of Information Act 2000; Apprenticeships, Skills, Children and Learning Act 2009; Enterprise Act 2016; Technical and Further Education Act 2017; Skills and Post-16 Education Act 2022

Status: Current legislation

Text of statute as originally enacted

Revised text of statute as amended

The Institute for Apprenticeships and Technical Education (Transfer of Functions etc) Act 2025 (c. 14) included provision to abolish the Institute and transfer its functions to the Department for Education.
