= Manchester Metropolitan University =

Public university in Manchester, England

- Coat of arms
- Former name: Manchester Polytechnic (1970-92)
- Motto: Many Arts, Many Skills
- Type: Public
- Established: 1992 – Manchester Metropolitan University Predecessor institutions: 1970 – Manchester Polytechnic; 1956 – Manchester College of Science and Technology; 1918 – Manchester Municipal College of Technology; 1892 – Manchester Municipal Technical School; 1883 – Manchester Technical School and the Manchester Mechanics' Institution; 1838 – Manchester School of Design; 1824 – Manchester Mechanics' Institution
- Endowment: £1.46M (2021)
- Chancellor: Antony Jenkins
- Vice-Chancellor: Malcolm Press
- Students: 39,095 (2022/23)
- Undergraduates: 29,890 (2022/23)
- Postgraduates: 9,210 (2022/23)
- Location: Manchester, England; 53.47°N 2.24°W
- Campus: All Saints, Birley Fields
Scarf
- Website: mmu.ac.uk

Manchester Metropolitan University is a public university in Manchester, England. The university's predecessor, Manchester Polytechnic, gained university status in 1992. The university has 44,000 students and over 5,100 members of staff. It hosts four faculties (Arts and Humanities, Business and Law, Health and Education and Science and Engineering). It is the fifth-largest university in the United Kingdom by total enrolment.

== History ==
Manchester Metropolitan University was developed from mergers of various colleges with various specialisms, including technology, art and design. Its founding can be traced back to the Manchester Mechanics Institute, which was established in 1824 entirely through private initiative and funds to teach artisans the basic principles of science by part-time study, and the Manchester School of Design (f. 1838) latterly known as the Manchester School of Art. The painter L. S. Lowry attended in the years after the First World War, where he was taught by the noted impressionist Adolphe Valette. Schools of Commerce (f. 1889), Education (f. 1878), and Domestic Science (f. 1880) were added alongside colleges at Didsbury, Crewe, Alsager and the former Domestic and Trades College (f. 1911). The Manchester College of Science and Technology, which had originally been the Mechanics Institute and would then become UMIST, transferred its non-degree courses to the School of Art by 1966. The institution renamed itself as Manchester Polytechnic in 1970, which was followed by series of mergers with the Didsbury College of Education and Hollings College in 1977, as well as City of Manchester College of Higher Education in 1983. In 1987, the institution became a founding member of the Northern Consortium, and became a corporate body on 1 April 1989 as allowed by the terms of the Education Reform Act.

On 24 October 1989, Nirvana played their second UK show here while it was still called Manchester Polytechnic.

=== University status ===
On 15 September 1992, Manchester Polytechnic gained university status under the Further and Higher Education Act 1992, and then became Manchester Metropolitan University.

After earning university status, Manchester Met absorbed Crewe and Alsager College of Higher Education, and in 2004 the Manchester School of Physiotherapy (MSOP), an institution officially formed in 1991 through the amalgamation of the Schools of Physiotherapy of the Manchester Royal Infirmary (MRI) and of Withington Hospital. MSOP was previously affiliated with the Victoria University of Manchester, which conferred degree-level courses by extension until the final class of 2005. MSOP joined Manchester Metropolitan University as the Department of Physiotherapy in 2004, and was later renamed as the Department of Health Professions.

The university's logo is derived from the upper part of the shield of the university's coat-of-arms, with six spade-irons positioned together, suggesting hard toil and entrenchment.

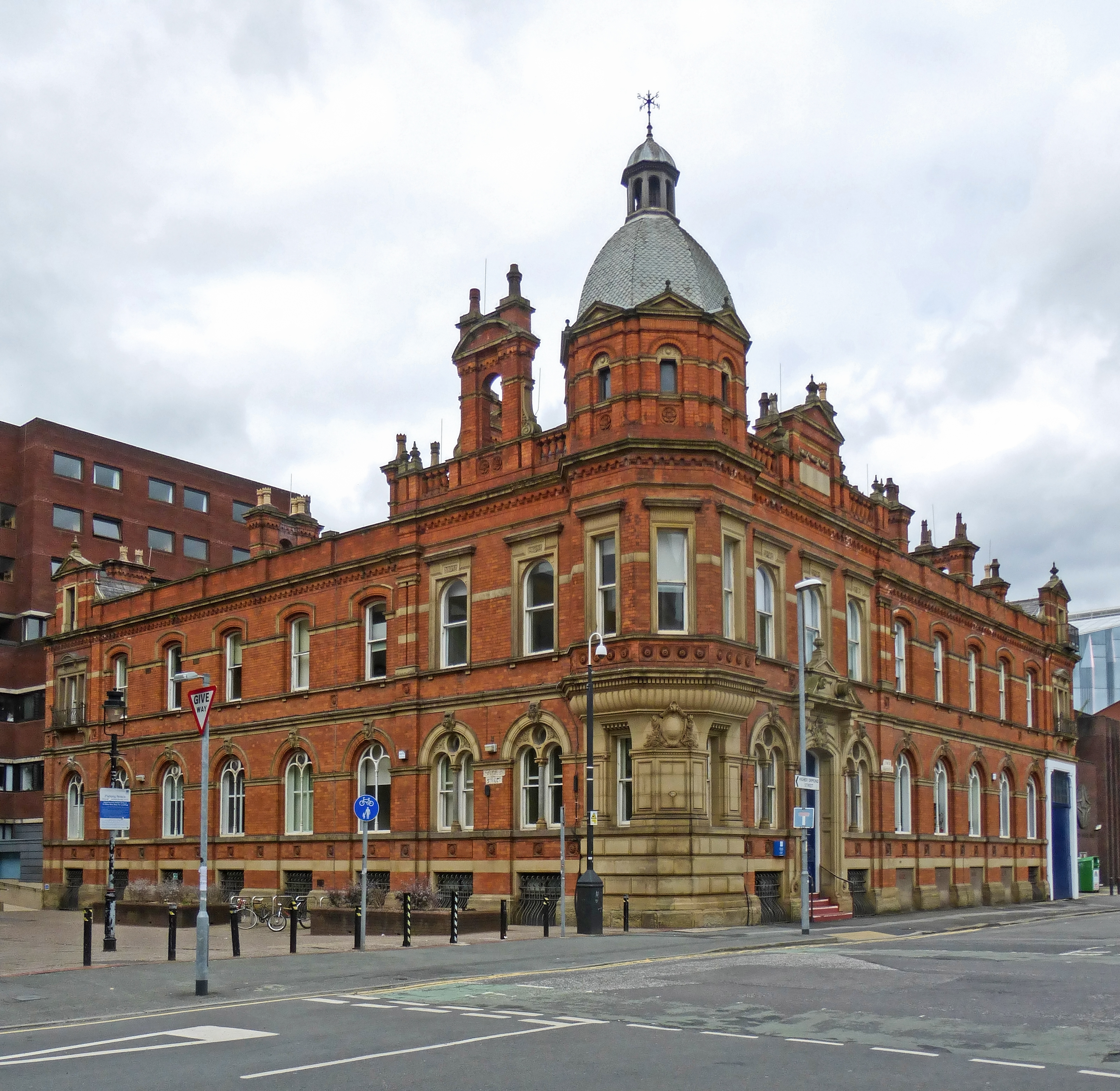
Ormond Building

== Campus ==
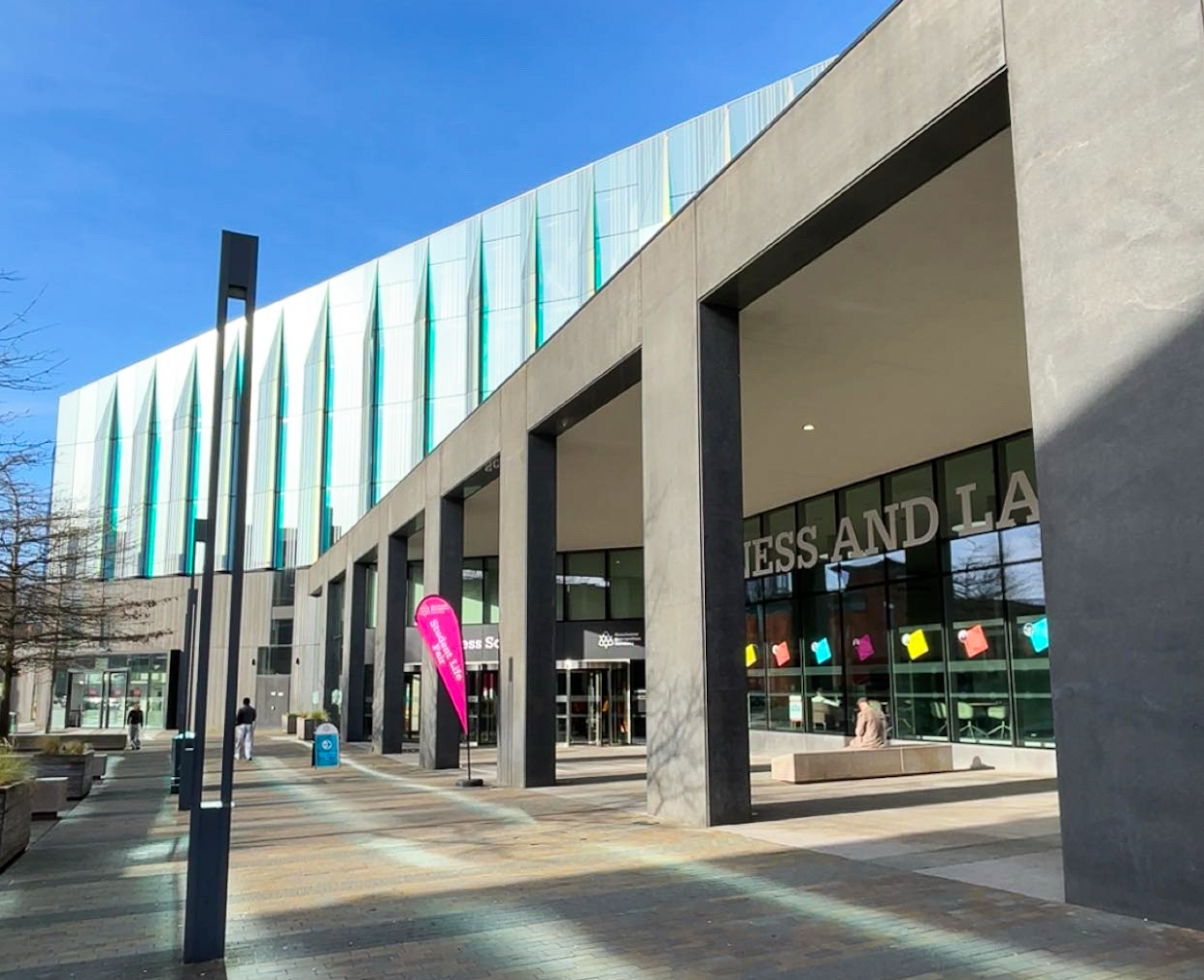
Manchester Met's Business School

The university was previously located on seven sites: five in Manchester (All Saints, Aytoun, Didsbury, Elizabeth Gaskell, and Hollings) and two in Cheshire (Alsager and Crewe). However, the university later closed six of the seven sites to rationalise its estate, leaving the All Saints campus. The university moved the work of the Alsager campus to Crewe, while the Aytoun campus was closed in 2012 following the opening of a Business School on the main campus. The Elizabeth Gaskell, Hollings and Didsbury campuses were closed in 2014, with faculties being relocated to the main city centre campus in Manchester. The Crewe campus closed in summer 2019, a decision taken following a review conducted by financial advisory firm Deloitte.

The university's 10-year Estate Masterplan 2017–2027 was complemented by a £379m commitment to the Estates Investment Programme until 2024, delivering a range of projects including: the Arts and Humanities development, the Science and Engineering development, the School of Digital Arts (SODA), Manchester Metropolitan Institute of Sport, and the Student Residential portfolio.

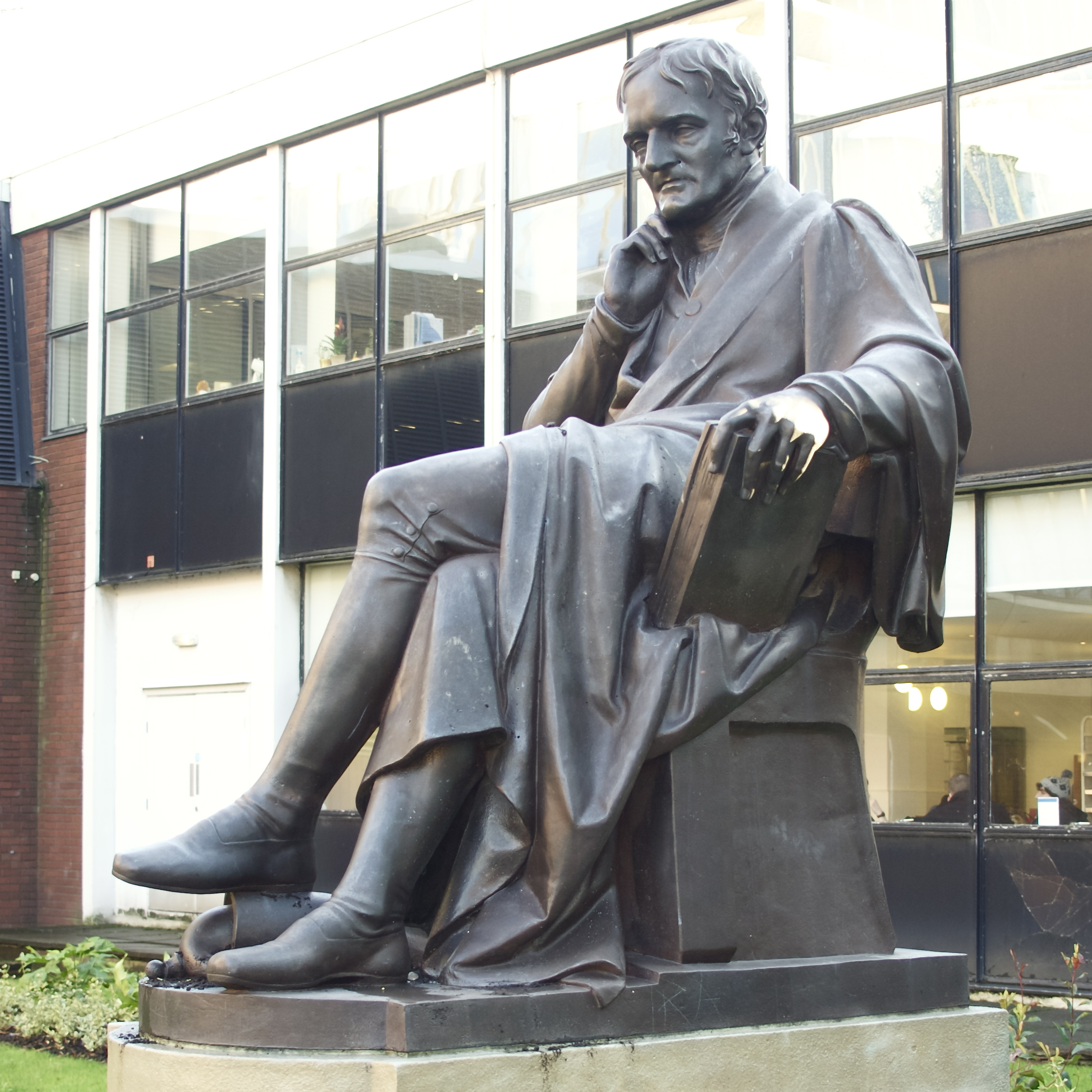
The statue of John Dalton by William Theed outside the university's 'John Dalton' Building on Chester Street

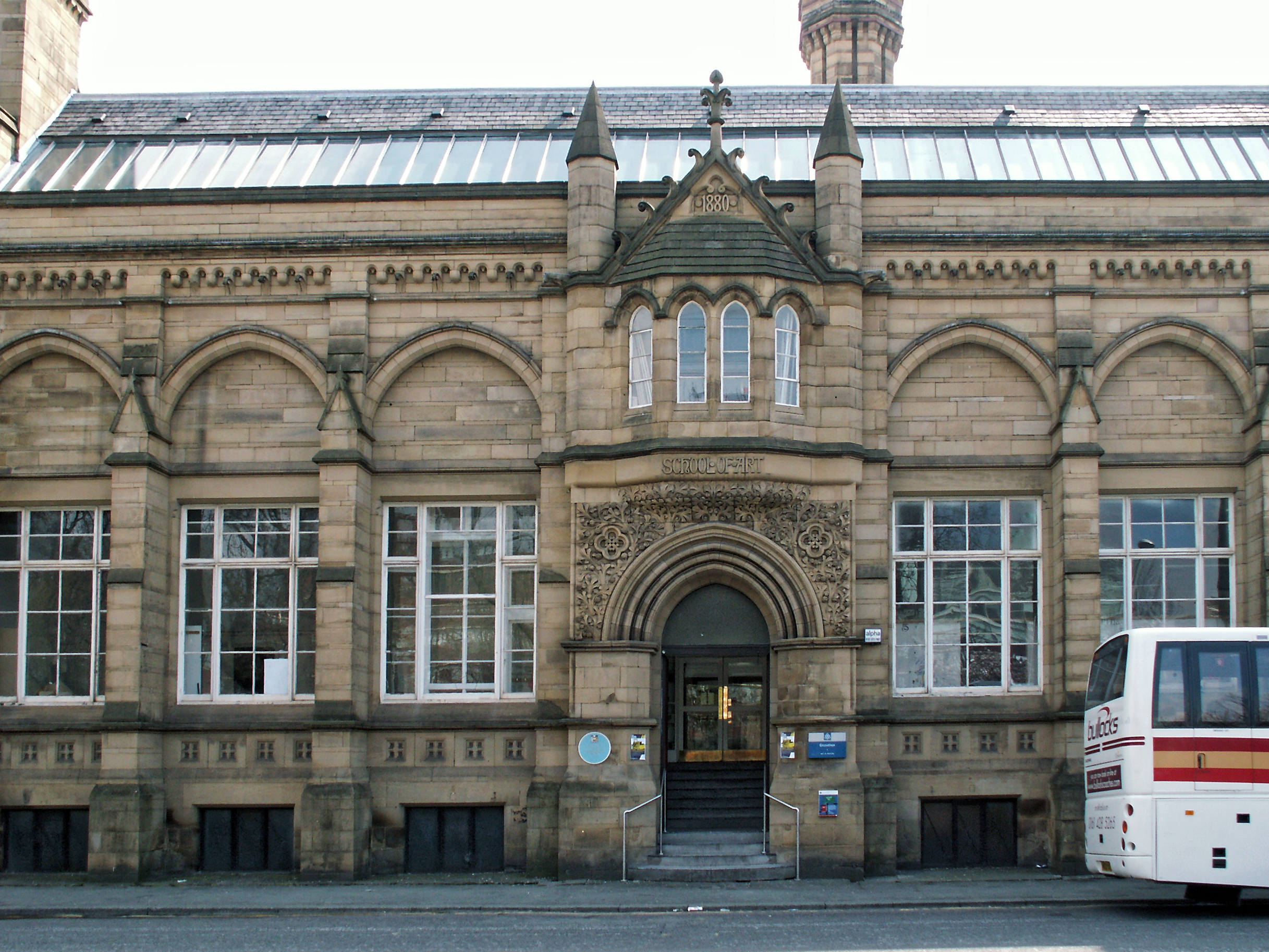
Manchester School of Art

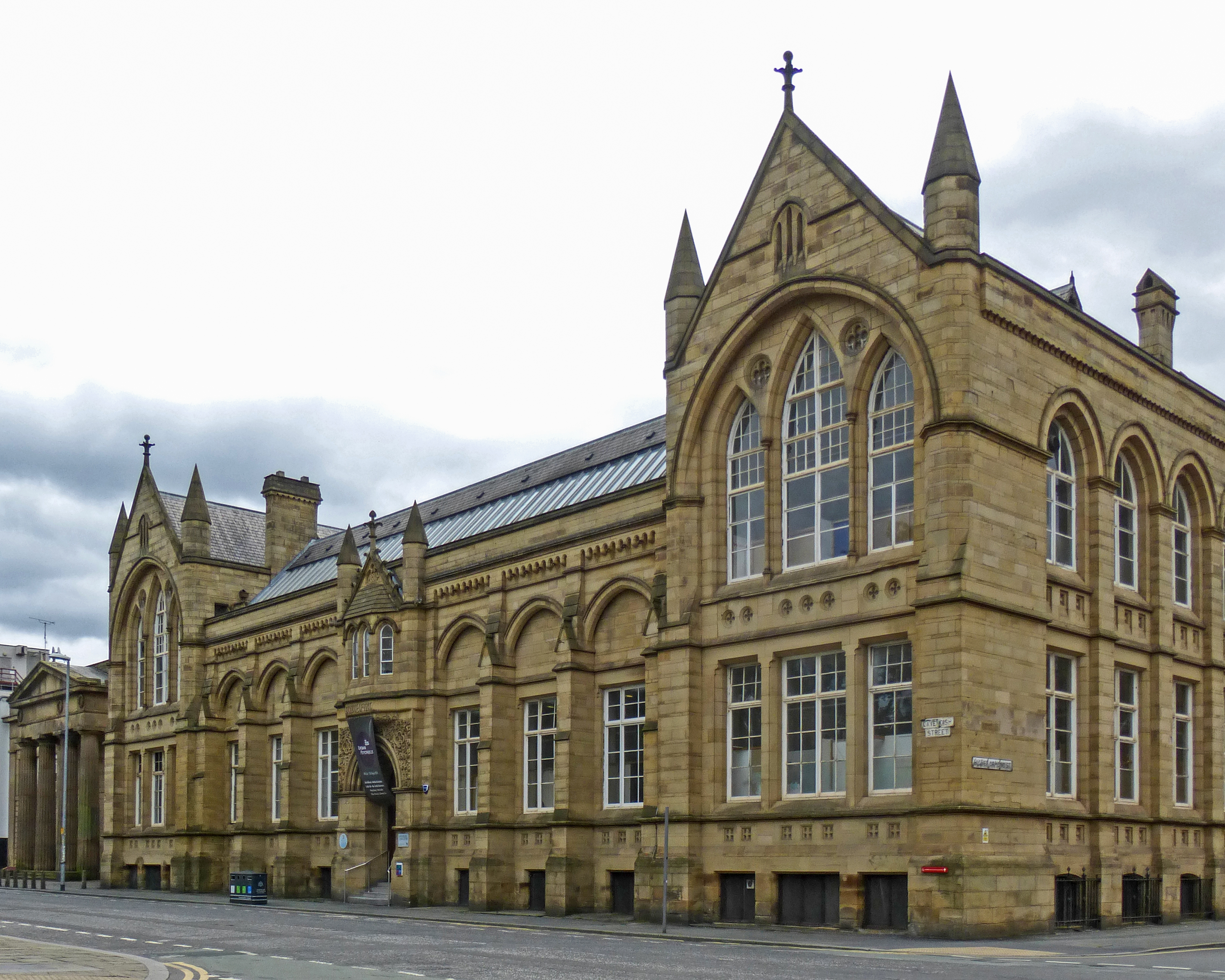
The Grosvenor Building, Manchester Met School of Art

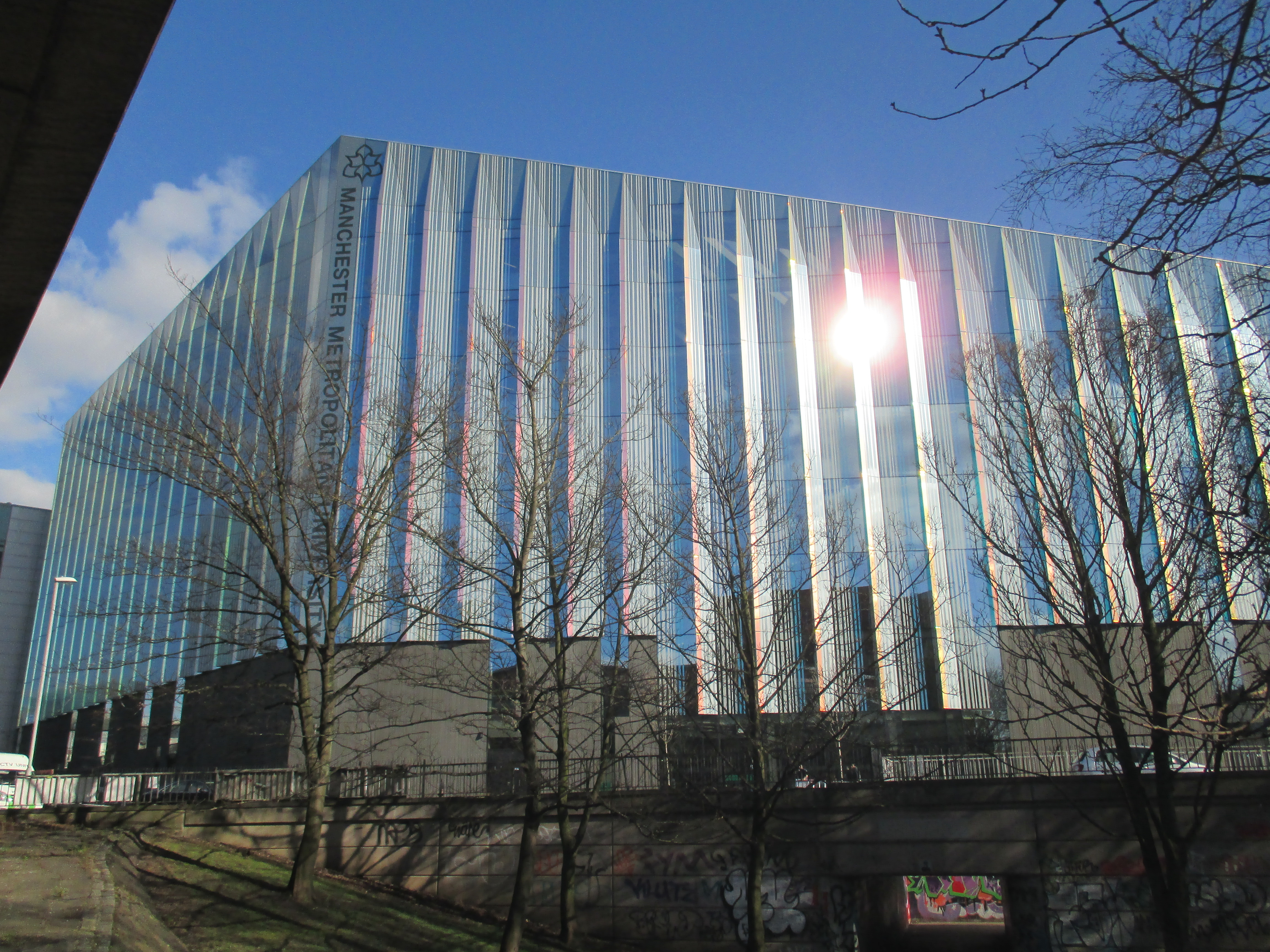
Manchester Metropolitan University Business School

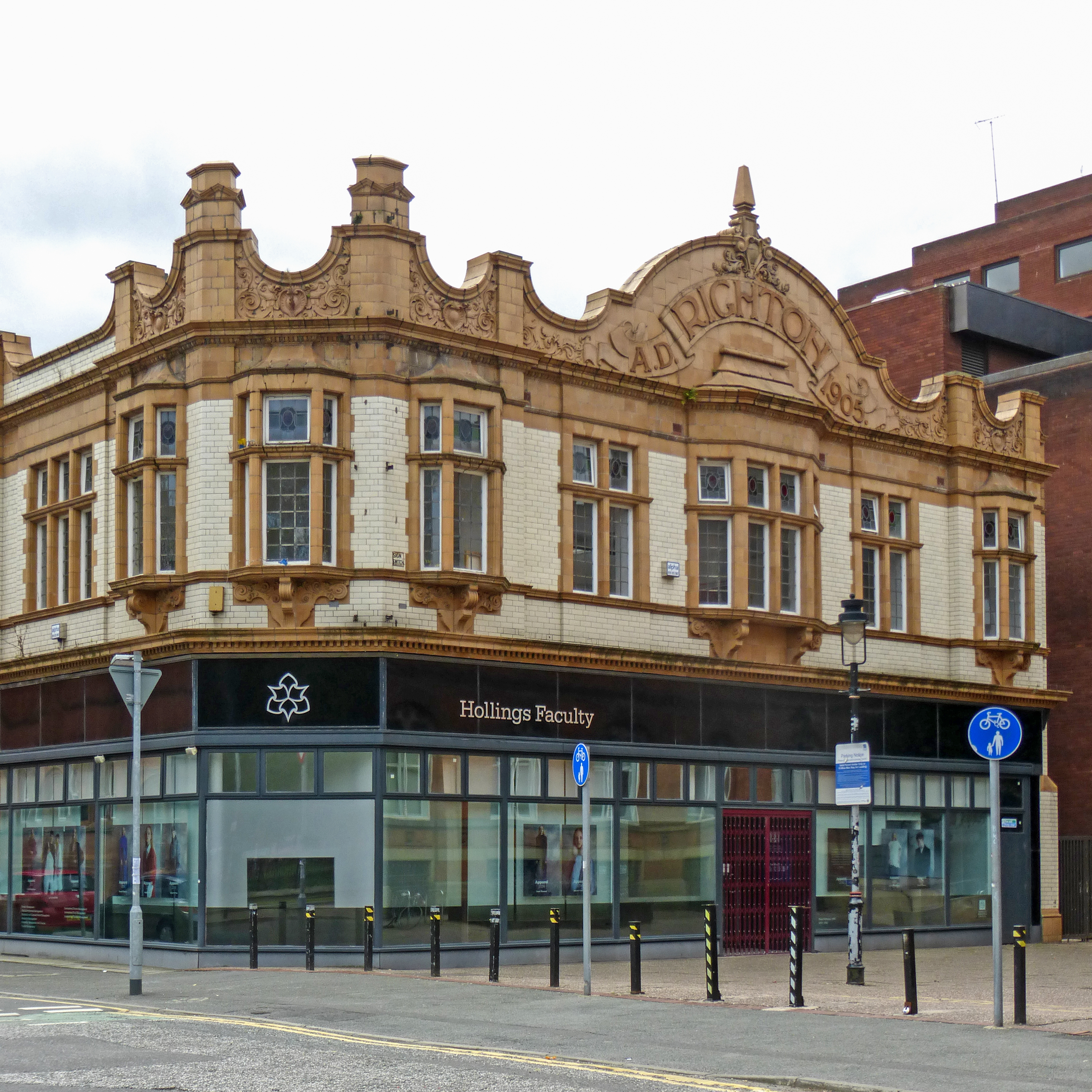
Righton Building

=== Library ===
The Library offers a study skills service and houses a number of special collections mainly relating to the fine and applied arts, like the Laura Seddon Greeting Card Collection, a collection of Victorian and Edwardian greeting cards. The North West Film Archive is managed by Manchester Metropolitan University's Library and is located within the Central Library. In 2021, the Manchester Poetry Library opened in the Grosvenor building.

The Library can be accessed 24/7 by Manchester Metstudents during term times and by visitors during term times on Saturdays and Sundays between 11:00 and 17:00.

== Organisation ==
=== Faculties ===
Manchester Metropolitan University comprises four faculties led by faculty pro-vice-chancellors, 10 Professional Services Directorates and a range of departments, schools and institutes. The faculties include Arts and Humanities, Business and Law, Health and Education, and Science and Engineering

Arts and Humanities

The Faculty of Arts and Humanities has more than 11,000 undergraduate, postgraduate and doctoral students. Home to Manchester School of Art (f. 1838), Manchester School of Architecture and Manchester Writing School, the faculty is one of the largest in the UK. It offers a range of subjects, from design to fashion, creative writing to architecture, linguistics to languages, digital arts to journalism, and history to sociology, across 9 departments and schools.

Business and Law

The Faculty of Business and Law has more than 10,000 undergraduate and postgraduate students enrolled on 120 different degree programmes. The faculty consists of the Business School, which holds accreditations from EQUIS, AACSB and AMBA, and the Manchester Law School. The faculty is also home to the majority of the university's Degree Apprenticeship programmes, with more than 2,400 apprentices studying across 15 programmes with 530 employer partners.

Health and Education

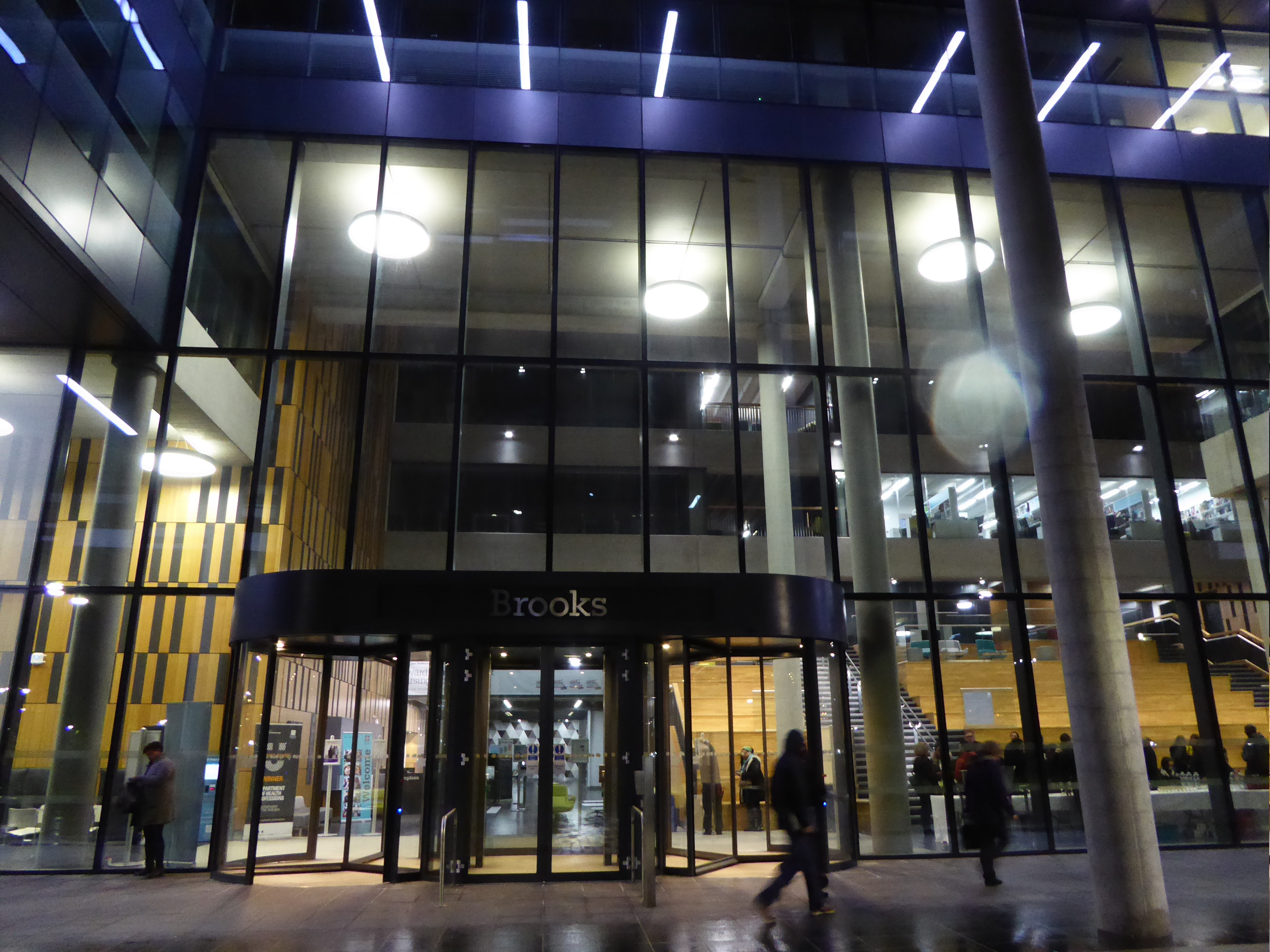
Brooks Building

Home to around 9,000 students across 5 departments, the Faculty of Health and Education is based in the Brooks building.

Science and Engineering

More than 6,000 students in the Faculty of Science and Engineering can take nearly 100 undergraduate and postgraduate degree programmes in a variety of subjects. A new, £115m base for the faculty opens in 2024, which will include teaching and research spaces, a 200-student super lab, study areas and green spaces.

=== Governance ===
In common with most universities in the United Kingdom, Manchester Met is headed formally by the chancellor, currently Antony Jenkins but led by the vice-chancellor, currently Malcolm Press.

The university's board of governors is responsible for determining the educational character and mission of the university. It also falls to the board of governors to ensure that the university's resources are used in line with the university's Article of Government. It also safeguards the university's assets and approves the annual estimates of income and expenditure.

The board of governors is responsible for broad policy, but the vice-chancellor, along with the University Executive Group, is responsible for overall management, policy implementation, organisation, operations and direction of the university.

In December 2014, it was announced that Malcolm Press had been appointed to succeed John Brooks as vice chancellor on 1 June 2015.

Manchester Met has around 40,000 students^{[1]}, making it currently the 11th in the UK for the biggest student population in 2020/21. The university employs over 4,000 staff.

=== Finances ===
In the financial year ending 31 July 2021, the university had a total income of £369m.

The total remuneration of the vice-chancellor in 2024/2025 was £387,000, which was reported to be 7.4 times higher than the median pay for a full-time member of staff at the university.

== Academic profile ==
=== Rankings ===
Rankings
National rankings
- Complete (2027): 53
- Guardian (2027): 41
- Times / Sunday Times (2027): 38=

Global rankings
- ARWU (2026): 601–700
- QS (2027): 600=
- THE (2026): 601–800

The university is the fifth most popular university by enrolment in the UK (2023/2024 data).

Manchester Metropolitan University is recognised for its research excellence, with 30% of its research rated world-leading in the 2021 Research Excellence Framework. Its Business School holds triple accreditation, including EQUIS, AMBA, and AACSB, placing it among a select group of global business schools. The university maintains a strong commitment to inclusion and diversity.

=== Research ===
30% of Manchester Met's overall research has been rated at the highest 'world leading' (4*) level and 90% of its research impact is rated 'world leading' (4*) or 'internationally excellent', (3*) across more than 740 academics.

The university has fourteen research centres:

- Advanced Materials and Surface Engineering
- Business Transformations
- Bioscience Research Centre
- Centre for Applied Computational Science
- Centre for Creative Writing, English Literature and Linguistics
- Centre for Decent Work and Productivity
- Ecology and Environment
- Education and Social Research Institute
- Future Economies
- Health, Psychology and Communities
- History Research Centre
- Manchester School of Art Research Centre
- Musculoskeletal Science and Sports Medicine
- Research Centre for Applied Social Sciences

== The International College ==
Manchester Metropolitan University International College (the International College) is part of Manchester Metropolitan University (Manchester Met). Based in the Lowry and Chatham building, the International College provides pathway programmes that support international students in progressing to a degree at Manchester Met.

The International College offers Foundation, International Year One, and Pre-Masters programmes. These pathways combine subject specific teaching with essential academic and study skills, helping students prepare for undergraduate or postgraduate study. Students can choose from more than 100 progression degrees across a wide range of subject areas, including:

- Art and Design
- Business, Finance and Management
- Business, Sports, Events and Hospitality Management
- Engineering and Computing
- Humanities and Social Sciences
- Science
- Health Studies (including Nursing, Health Professions and Psychology)

Upon successful completion of their pathway programme, students progress to their chosen degree at Manchester Met.

Students enrolled at the International College typically hold a single visa covering both the pathway programme and progression degree and have full access to university facilities and student services throughout their studies.

== Students' Union ==
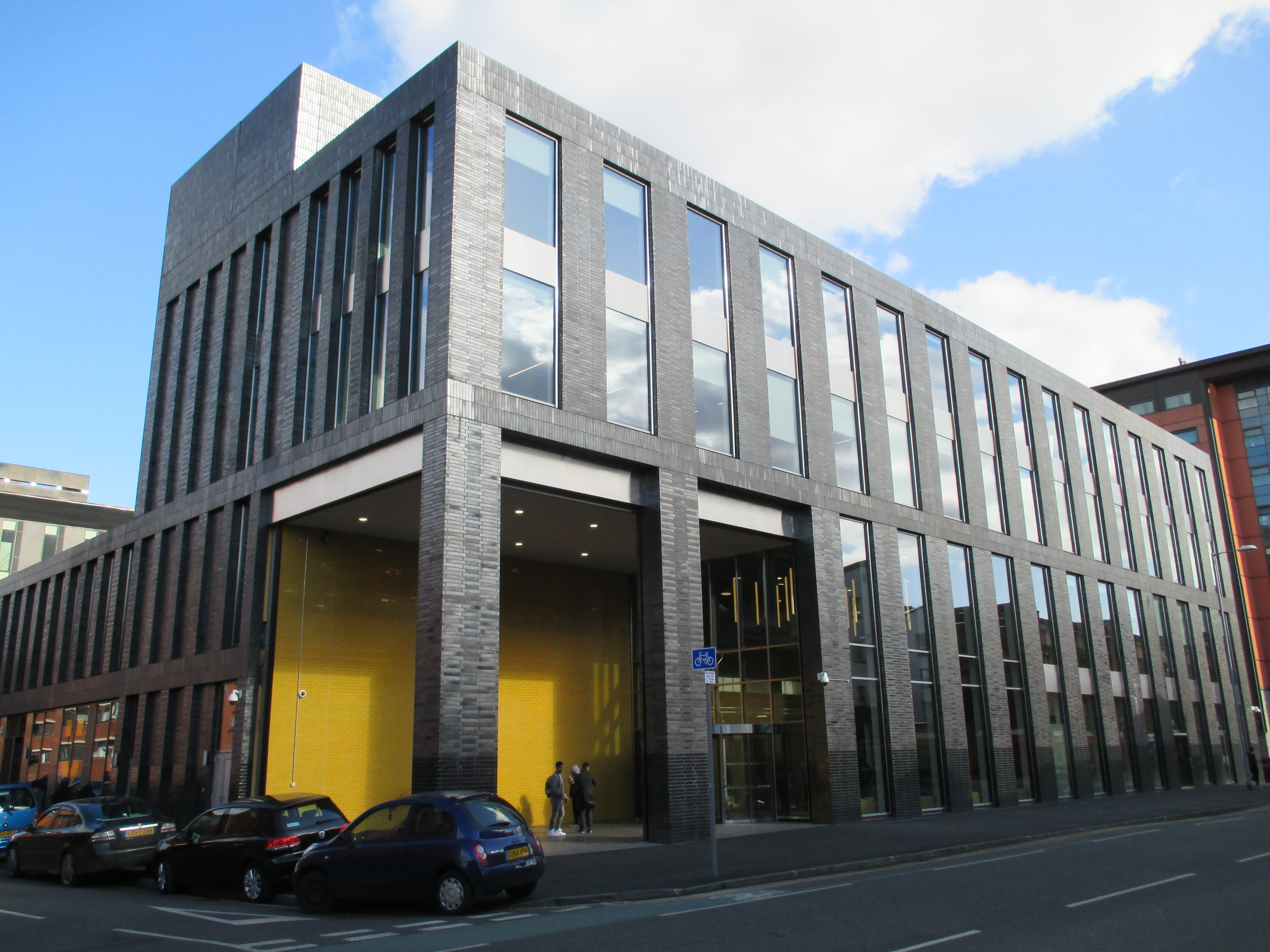
Manchester Met Students' Union

The Students' Union exists to represent all members at the Manchester Metropolitan University and students on accredited external courses. The Union is led by the Union Officers Group formed of five students of the university, elected by the students to lead the Union on their behalf. A shop and café catering to university students has also been set up inside the Students' Union. The Students' Union moved in January 2015 to a new purpose-built building on Higher Cambridge Street, next to Cambridge and Cavendish Halls of Residence.

== Notable alumni ==
Some in the list attended institutions which became part of present-day Manchester Metropolitan University.

Academia

- Edward Fletcher Cass, folklore
- James Corner, landscape architecture
- Sorcha Ní Fhlainn, film studies
- Freda Newcombe, neuropsychology
- David Park, art history
- Alan Clive Roberts, engineering
- Laura Serrant, nursing
- John Wilson, public policy
- Sue Wise, feminist theory

Arts and Creative

- Zawe Ashton, actress, playwright
- John Bishop, comedian, presenter
- John Bradley, actor
- Sarah Burton, Creative Director, Alexander McQueen
- Steve Coogan, actor, comedian & producer
- James Corner, landscape architect
- Brian Cosgrove, animator, producer, director
- Elizabeth Estensen, actress
- Isabelle Jane Foulkes, artist and disability campaigner
- Malcolm Garrett, Graphic Designer
- Thomas Heatherwick, designer
- Bernard Hill, actor
- Liz Jolly, Chief Librarian, British Library
- Gethin Jones, presenter
- Liz Kessler, writer
- L. S. Lowry, artist
- Lindsey McAlister, theatre director
- Martin Parr, photographer
- Heather Peace, actress, musician
- Greg Poole, artist
- Michelle Yeoh, actress
- Peter Saville, graphic designer
- John Thomson, actor and comedian
- David Threlfall, actor
- Dame Julie Walters, actress
- Carey Young, artist
- Chase & Status (Saul Milton), DJ
- Anouk Vogel, landscape architect

Business

- Helen Connolly, CEO, New Look
- Paul Hudson, CEO, Sanofi
- Jonathan Mildenhall, CEO, TwentyFirstCenturyBrand
- Nick Read, CEO Vodafone Group
- Dame Dianne Thompson, businesswoman
- Michael Turner, Chairman, Babcock International
- Paul S. Walsh, Executive Chairman, McLaren Group

Public sector and law

- Keith Bradley, Labour Party politician
- Sarah Green
- Patrick Harvie
- Mike Kane
- Afzal Khan
- Rebecca Long-Bailey
- Sylvia Pankhurst, feminist and campaigner
- Andrew Ranger (politician), Labour politician
- Paul Scriven, Baron Scriven of Hunters Bar
- Bibiana Campos Seijo, editor, publisher, and media executive
- Grant Shapps, Conservative politician
- Thelma Walker, Labour politician

Sport

- Michael Appleton, football manager and coach
- Karen Bardsley, professional footballer
- Mike Butt, Wales international rugby league footballer
- Daniel Collins, Irish rower
- Kadeena Cox, parasport athlete
- Mark Cueto, former professional rugby player
- Ashley Giles, former professional cricketer
- Danny Grewcock, former England rugby player
- Steve Round, Assistant Manager, Arsenal
- Paul Simpson, former professional football
- Gordon Taylor, former professional footballer

== See also ==
- Armorial of UK universities
- List of universities in the UK
- Post-1992 universities
